= 11me Escadrille de Chasse =

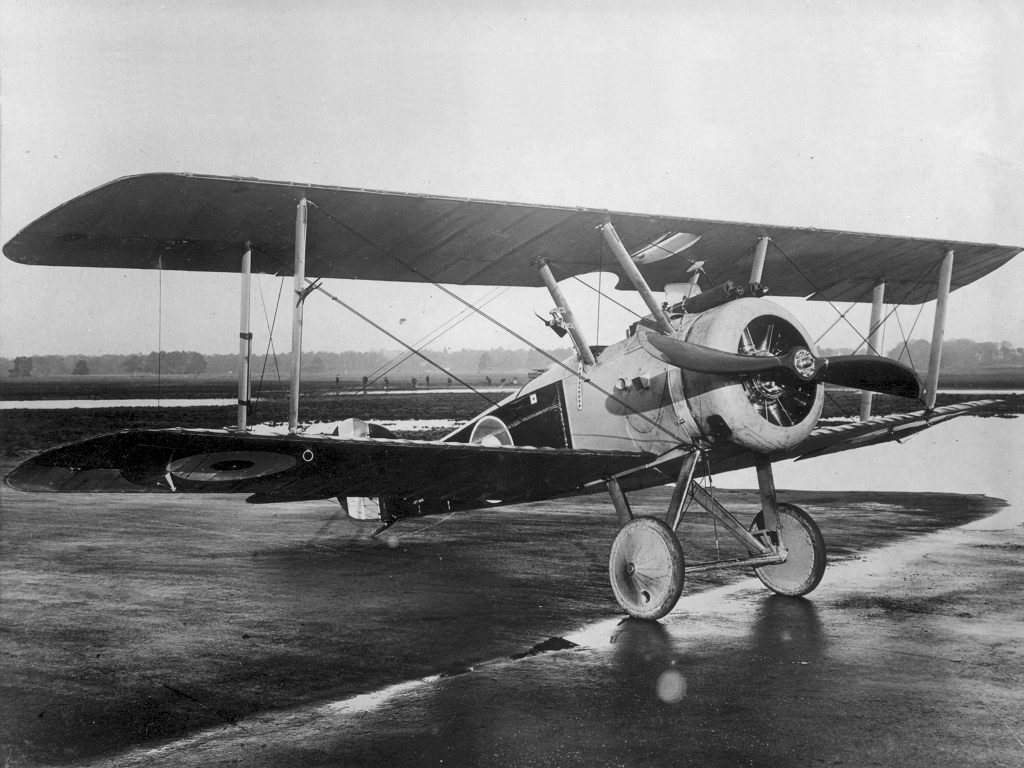
Sopwith Camel aircraft used by the escadrille

The 11ème Escadrille de Chasse was the third and last fighter squadron of the Belgian Air Component during World War I. It was organized as a dedicated fighter unit in March 1918, to fill out a fighter wing that supported the Belgian Army's advance near war's end.

== History ==
The 11ème Escadrille de Chasse was founded in March 1918 as the third dedicated squadron of the newly formed Groupe de Chasse of the Aviation Militaire Belge. It would take until 28 May for the new squadron to become operational. The new unit used a unit insignia upon its airplanes that was adopted from Willy Coppens's personal insignia with his consent. The new escadrille scored its first victory on 27 September 1918. In its short existence, the squadron claimed twelve wins and was credited with seven verified aerial victories. In turn, it suffered two pilots KIA and one pilot WIA.

== Commanding officers ==
- Paul Hiernaux: March 1918 - 11 November 1918

== Aerodromes ==
1 Les Moeres: May 1918 - October 1918

2 Moerkerke: October 1918 - 11 November 1918

== Aircraft ==
The squadron was founded with castoff Sopwith Camels from 1ère Escadrille de Chasse as well as a few Hanriot HD.1s.

== Operations ==
At the start of World War I, Belgium was neutral. An overwhelming invasion by the German army left Belgium partially occupied by the end of 1914, with its preserved territory shielded by deliberate defensive flooding at Nieuwpoort by the Belgians. As a result, the Aviation Militaire Belgium was based in the diminished remnant of a small country, and performed largely in a static defensive mode. In March 1918, the 11ème Escadrille de Chasse was founded as a dedicated fighter squadron capable of being included in combined Allied operations. Its success coincided with the September 1918 Belgian Army advance.
