= Groupe de Chasse (Belgium) =

The Groupe de Chasse was Belgium's first dedicated fighter wing. It was created in March 1918 at Les Moëres aerodrome near Veurne. On request of King Albert I, Captain-commandant Fernand Jacquet was appointed Commanding Officer, and the Groupe de Chasse also became known as the Groupe Jaquet. It consisted of the 9ème Escadrille de Chasse, the 10ème Escadrille de Chasse and the 11ème Escadrille de Chasse.

By war's end, the group was able to support the offensive, and could manage to get up to 40 aircraft airborne at short notice. In October 1918, the Group moved to Moerkerke. After the war, the three Squadrons were assigned to different aerodromes: 9 Squadron was stationed at Berchem-Sainte-Agathe, while 10 and 11 Squadrons moved to Bochum in Germany.
