= 11th Squadron (Belgium) =

- Active: 1 March 1918-11 October 2018
- Country: Belgium
- Branch: Belgian Air Force
- Role: Instruction
- Garrison/HQ: Cazaux Air Base

Insignia
- Identification symbol: A bat on a yellow triangle

Aircraft flown
- Trainer: Dassault Alpha-Jet

11th Squadron is a training squadron of the Belgian Air Force, deployed at Cazaux Air Base in France, in the scope of the Advanced Jet Training School (AJeTS).

The school closed on 11 October 2018.

== History ==
=== First World War ===
==== Origins ====
The 11ème Escadrille de Chasse was created on 1 March 1918 at Les Moëres aerodrome near Veurne. As the third dedicated fighter squadron of the Aviation Militaire Belge, next to 9ème Escadrille and 10ème Escadrille, it was part of Belgium's first fighter wing, the Groupe de Chasse. The new unit used an insignia that was adopted from Willy Coppens's personal insignia with his consent. The Cocotte is a two dimensional representation of an origami Chicken, and was painted in white on the airplanes. The squadron was equipped with castoff Sopwith Camels from 1ère Escadrille de Chasse as well as a few Hanriot HD.1s, and under command of Commander Paul Hiernaux.

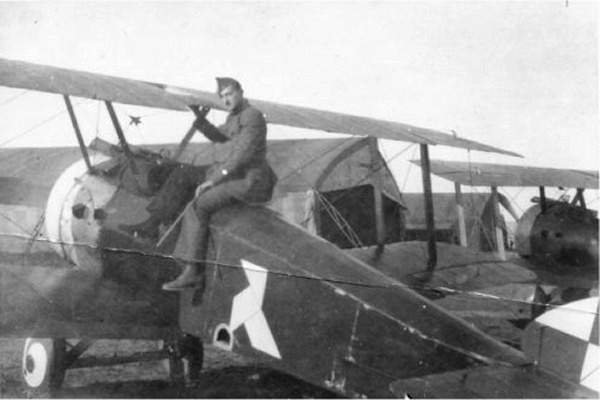
11th Squadron Sopwith Camel with white Cocotte insignia

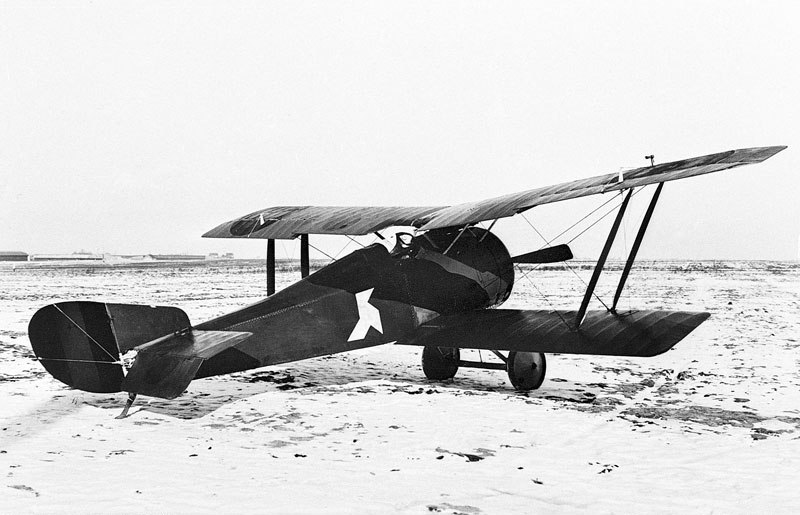
11th Squadron Hanriot HD.1 in 1918

==== Operations ====
11ème Escadrille de Chasse became operational as a fighter squadron, capable of being included in combined Allied operations during World War I, on 28 May 1918. The new escadrille scored its first victory on 27 September 1918. In its short operational career, the squadron claimed twelve wins and was credited with seven verified aerial victories. In turn, it suffered two pilots KIA and one pilot WIA. Its success coincided with the September 1918 Belgian Army advance. To support this advance, 11ème Escadrille moved to Moerkerke near the Dutch border on 30 October 1918

=== Between the wars ===
After the armistice, 11th Squadron participated in the occupation of Germany. It operated from Bochum until 5 July 1919, when it was recalled to Berchem-Sainte-Agathe, in the outskirts of Brussels, where it is disbanded in August 1919. In March 1920, 11th Squadron was recreated at Berchem-Sainte-Agathe, with the same squadron number, insignia and aircraft, augmented by Fokker D-VII aircraft, yielded by the Germans as compensation for damages during World War I. Lieutenant Albert Massaux took command of the squadron. In the following months, the squadron moved up and down to Wilrijk, before returning to Bochum on 9 July 1920. During their stay there, 11th Squadron transformed to Airco DH.4. On 5 January 1922, 11th Squadron moved to Bierset for the first time, only to move to Schaffen at the start of 1923. It was disbanded a second time on 19 February 1923.

In 1935, the squadrons at Bierset were re-organised into 9 and 11th Squadrons of the 5th Group of the 1st Aeronautical Regiment. Initially still equipped with Bréguet XIX, they soon received the Belgian Renard R 31 monoplane. Their mission changed from bombardment to observation. As from 1938, the “Sioux” symbol appeared on the aircraft. On 11th Squadron aircraft the "Sioux" was surrounded by a red circle. The squadron motto was "Tenacity".

=== Second World War ===
Just before the outbreak of World War II, 11th Squadron was assigned to 6th Group under command of Commander Dumonceau, while 9 Squadron remained in the 5th Group. To improve mobility and the possibility of deployed operations, each group comprised a maintenance squadron, a field train of about 25 vehicles, and an anti-aircraft unit of 40mm Bofors guns.

Commanded by Captain Henri de la Lindi, 11th Squadron took an active part in the 18 days campaign. On the morning of 10 May, 11th Squadron rejoined its diversion airfield at Hannut, few hours before Bierset was bombarded by Dornier 17's of the Luftwaffe. 11th Squadron was one of three squadrons that continued to fight until the surrender on 28 May 1940. Both "Sioux" squadrons (9 and 11) combined executed 54 combat missions, for a loss of three pilots and 11 aircraft.

=== Cold War ===
After World War II, 11th Squadron was resurrected as a night fighter squadron of 1st Fighter Wing at Beauvechain Air Base on 25 April 1951. It was equipped with de Havilland Mosquito NFXXXs, and the squadron insignia was a grey bat on a yellow triangle. As from the summer of 1952, it entered the jet age by slowly transforming to Gloster Meteor NFXI. The squadron only gained operational status on that type on 10 September 1956. On 17 December 1957, 11th Squadron received as first non-Canadian squadron, its initial batch of CF-100 Canuck. It was disbanded again at Beauvechain on 3 November 1960.

== Training squadron ==
=== Sint Truiden ===
In 1971, a thorough revision of the Air Force training system called for the creation of new training squadrons. Re-created on 14 May, 11th Squadron became part of the “Perfectioning Center” at Brustem (Sint Truiden), together with 7 and 9 Squadrons. Its initial mission was to provide Instrument Flight Training to the student pilots on Lockheed T-33. This aircraft was to be retired from service on 23 August 1979.

The first delivery of its successor, the Dassault Alpha-Jet took place on 7 December 1978, and as of 1979 the students started training on this aircraft. The mission of 11th Squadron was now to provide Initial Operational Training (IOT), combining simulated air-to-air combat and air-to-ground tactics. 11th Squadron continued to be based at Brustem until the move to Beauvechain.

=== Beauvechain ===
On 19 November 1996 all training units were moved to Beauvechain, a former air defense base, to become 1st Wing. A few years later, in 2000, the Alpha-Jet received an extensive avionics update. The Inertial Reference System updated by GPS, combined with a Head-up display provided the possibility to simulate tactics used on the F-16.

On 30 August 2001 a further re-organisation of the training squadrons lead to an expansion of 11th Squadron's mission. It took over the Advanced Flying Training (AFT) from 7 Squadron. During the AFT, students having finished on the SF260 took their first steps on a jet aircraft, and graduated as pilots after succeeding. Afterwards, they stayed in 11th Squadron to complete the IOT.

=== Cazaux ===
In the scope of a European training programme, the Advanced Jet Training School (AJeTS), 11th Squadron moved to Base Aérienne 120 at Cazaux in France on 14 September 2005. Transfer of the aircraft had begun as from 2004. The Belgian, updated, Alpha-Jets are operated alongside the French, non-updated, aircraft to provide the first taste of operational flying to Belgian and French students alike. Students and instructors fly out of a unit, combining the insignia and traditions of the Belgian 11th Squadron and the French SPA73 and SPA78 to form the Escadron de Chasse 2/8 "Nice". After the move of the complete fleet, the AFT mission was fulfilled, also in the scope of AJeTS, by the Ecole de l'Aviation de Chasse at Base Aèrienne 705 at Tours.

The school closed on 11 October 2018.

=== Beauvechain ===
On 11 October 2018 the SQN Control of the Control and Reporting Centre ( Efflux) took over the name, Flag and traditions of the 11 SQN and since then officially bears the name 11 SQN Air Defence. On 5 October 2020 the unit officially moved to a newly built facility at Beauvechain (1W) Airbase upon which the 11 SQN is back in its former location. The 11 SQN AD is responsible for the Belgian participation in the NATINAMDS (NATO Integrated Air and Missile Defence System) and warrants the security of the Belgian airspace under National and NATO Command. It is here that the NAOC (National Airspace Operation Center) will be located.
