= List of World War I aces from Belgium =

Although Belgium was neutral as the initial attacks of World War I were launched, it was soon invaded by Germany and partially overrun. The Belgian Air Force had been founded in 1909, and now found itself struggling to survive and expand under these severe conditions. Nevertheless, the tiny Belgian Air Force produced five flying aces, and a sixth one flew for the French Aéronautique Militaire. The leading Belgian ace was also the premier balloon buster of the war.

- Willy Coppens – 37 confirmed aerial victories.
- Andre de Meulemeester – 11 confirmed aerial victories.
- Edmond Thieffry – 10 confirmed aerial victories.
- Fernand Jacquet – 7 confirmed aerial victories.
- Adolphe DuBois d'Aische – 6 confirmed aerial victories.
- Jan Olieslagers – 6 confirmed aerial victories.

== See also ==
- Aerial victory standards of World War I
