= 9th Squadron (Belgium) =

- Active: 1 March 1918
- Country: Belgium
- Branch: Belgian Air Force
- Role: Instruction
- Garrison/HQ: Beauvechain Air Base
- Motto: Boutez en avant (Get In)

Insignia
- Identification symbol: A silver "Cocotte" on green background

Aircraft flown
- Trainer: SF260

9th Squadron is a training squadron of the Belgian Air Force, constituting the Basic Flying Training School together with 5 Squadron.

== History ==
=== First World War ===
==== The squadron's origins ====
The 9ème Escadrille de Chasse was originally the 1ère Escadrille de Chasse, which was founded in February 1916 as the first dedicated fighter squadron of the Aviation Militaire Belge.

On 1 March 1918, while stationed at Les Moëres aerodrome near Veurne, it would be reorganized into the 9ème Escadrille and become part of Belgium's first fighter wing, the Groupe de Chasse. The squadron continued to use the equipment and personnel of the 1ère Escadrille. 9ème Escadrille also inherited the "Thistle" symbol and motto "Nemo me impune lacessit" or "No-one can challenge me unpunished". The squadron's fleet consisted largely of Hanriot-Dupont 1s, supplemented by some Sopwith Camels.

The 10ème Escadrille and 11ème Escadrille were the other squadrons of the Group, also known as the Groupe Jaquet, after its commanding officer, Capitaine Fernand Jacquet. Headed by Capitaine Walter Gallez, 9th Squadron counted a number of famous fighter pilots amongst its ranks: Willy Coppens (who was also the first Belgian pilot to use the "Cocotte" on his aircraft), Jan Olieslagers, André de Meulemeester.

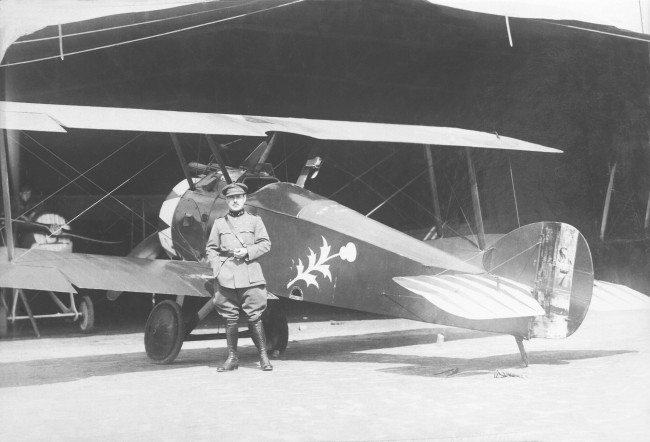
Jan Olieslagers posing in front of a Sopwith Camel of 9th Squadron

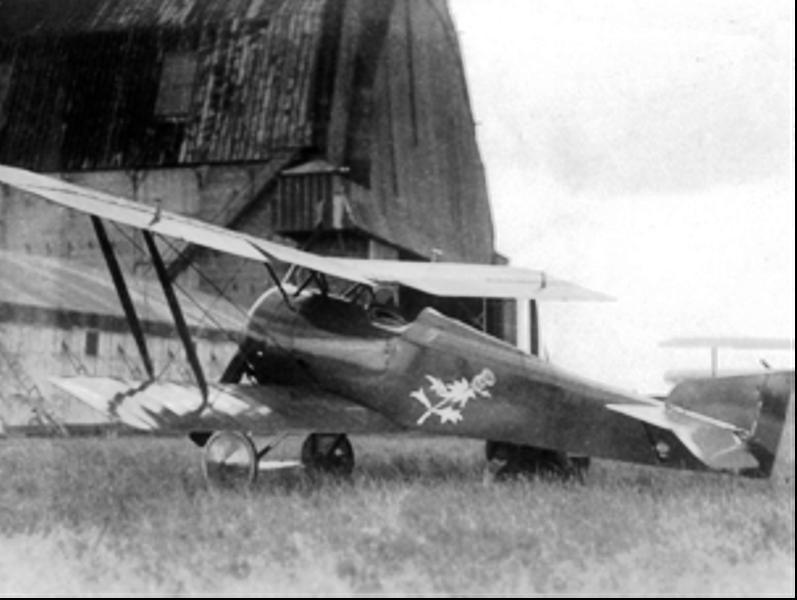
Hanriot-Dupont 1 of 9th Squadron in 1919

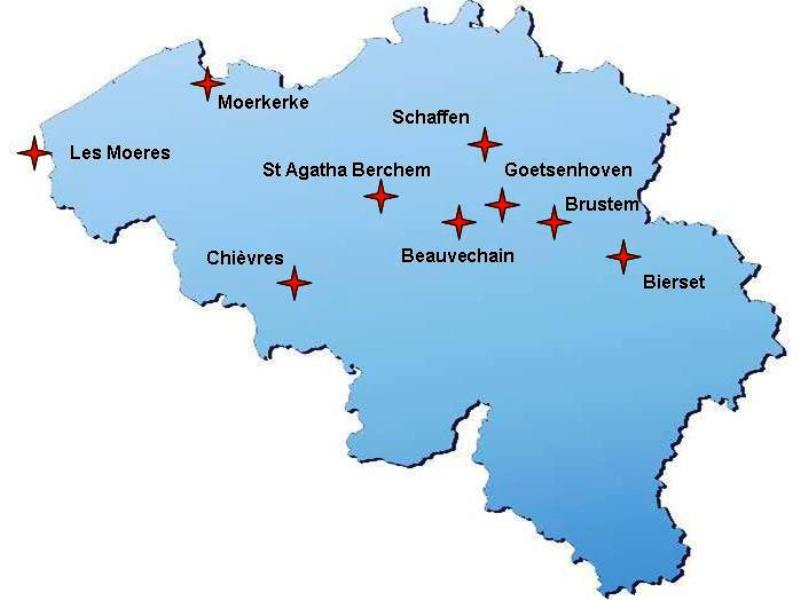
A map of Belgium, locating the airfields on which 9th Squadron was stationed

==== Operations ====
During the initial years of World War I, the Aviation Militaire Belge was based in the diminished remnant of a small country, and performed largely in support of a defensive army. Only in September 1918 did the Belgian Army advance. To support the offensive, 9ème Escadrille moved to Moerkerke near the Dutch border in October 1918. At the end of the war, 9ème Escadrille was credited with 51 verified aerial victories, 41 of which were enemy observation balloons. In turn, it suffered three pilots wounded in action or captured.

=== Between the wars ===
After the armistice, 9th Squadron was stationed at Berchem-Sainte-Agathe, in the outskirts of Brussels. In 1919, they moved again to Schaffen near Diest to be integrated in 2nd Group. The squadron equipment was augmented by Fokker D-VII aircraft, yielded by the Germans as compensation for damages during World War I. In March 1920, 9th Squadron was equipped with SPAD XIII aircraft, and together with 10 Squadron, made up 4th Group. Still at Schaffen, the Squadron received their new Nieuport-Delage 29 aircraft in July 1922, only to be transformed into 2 Squadron sometime during 1924.

In 1935, the Squadrons at Bierset were re-organised into 9th Squadron and 11 Squadron of the 5th Group of the 1st Aeronautical Regiment. Initially still equipped with Bréguet XIX, they soon received the Belgian Renard R 31 monoplane. Their mission changed from Bombardment to Observation. As of 1938, the "Sioux" symbol appeared on the aircraft, designed by Roger Delannay. On 9th Squadron aircraft the "Sioux" was surrounded by a blue circle. The squadron motto was "Tenacity".

=== Second World War ===
Just before the outbreak of World War II, 11 Squadron was assigned to 6th Group. 9th Squadron remained the only flying unit in the 5th Group which was now under command of Commander Breulhez. To improve mobility and the possibility of deployed operations, each group comprised a maintenance squadron, a field train of about 25 vehicles, and an anti-aircraft unit of 40mm Bofors guns.

Commanded by Captain Lekeuche, 9th Squadron took an active part in the 18 days campaign. On the morning of 10 May, 9th Squadron rejoined its diversion airfield at Duras, few hours before Bierset was bombarded by Dornier 17's of the Luftwaffe. 9th Squadron was one of three squadrons that continued to fight until the surrender on 28 May 1940. Both "Sioux" squadrons (9 and 11) combined executed 54 combat missions, for a loss of three pilots and 11 aircraft.

=== Cold War ===
After the war, with the creation of the 7th Day Fighter Wing at Chièvres, 9th Squadron was resurrected under the command of Commander Demey. The other units of 7th Wing were 7 Squadron and 8 Squadrons. The Squadron crest represented the "Cocotte", originally painted on Willy Coppens’ Nieuport 17 in 1917, but this time in silver on a green background. The associated motto was selected by Major Coppens in its French form "Boutez en avant" in 1936, and translated to the English "Get In" by 7th Wing Commander Major Van Lierde. Starting on Gloster Meteor F8 on 17 March 1952, the Squadron transformed to Hawker Hunter F4 in June 1956, only to be disbanded on 15 March 1957.

== Training Squadron ==
=== Sint Truiden ===
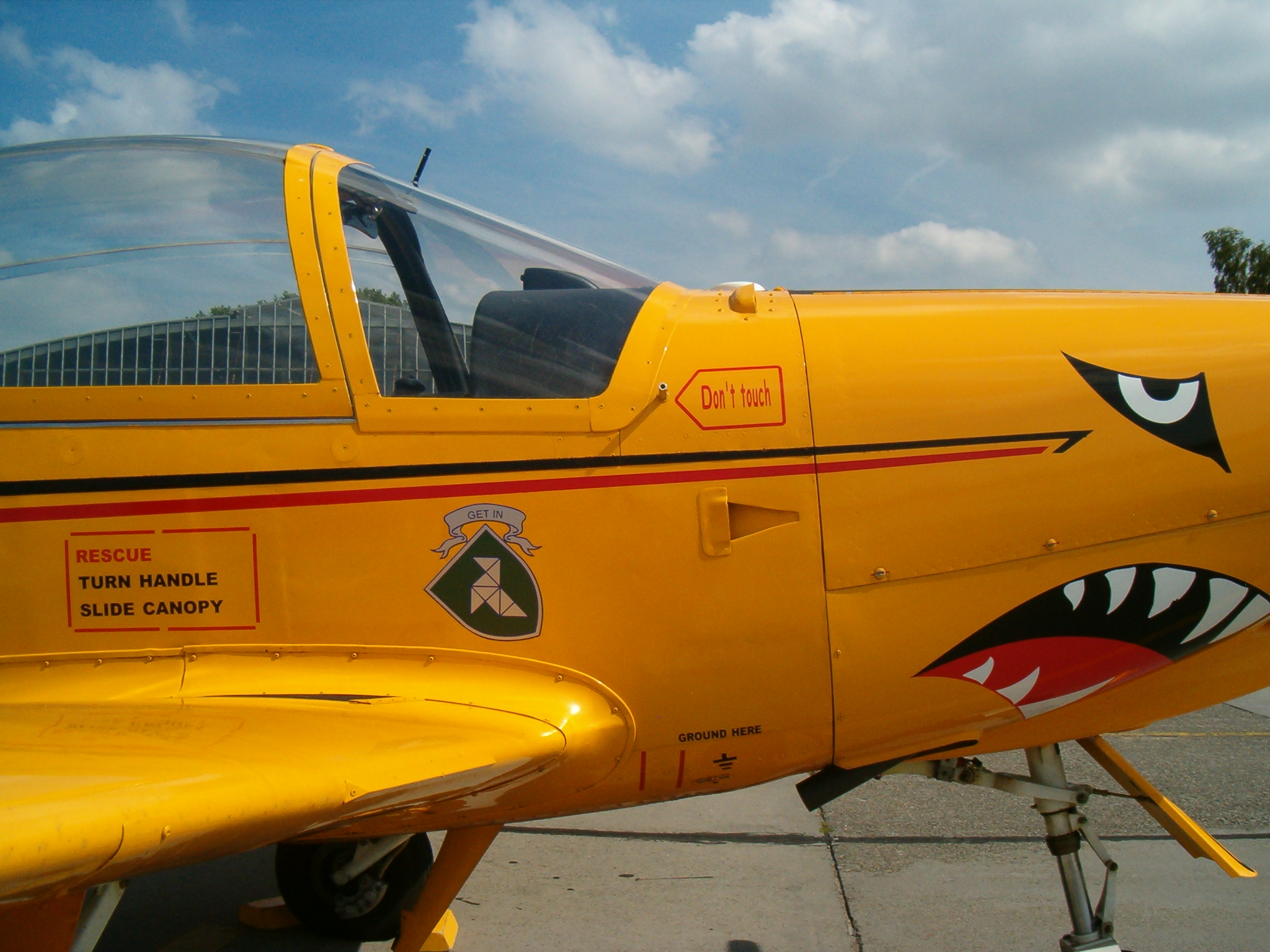
SF260 with 9th Squadron badge

In 1971, a thorough revision of the Air Force training system called for the creation of new training squadrons. Re-created on 16, 9 November Squadron became part of the "Perfectioning Center" at Brustem, together with 7 Squadron and 11 Squadron. Its mission was to convert the new Instructor Pilots on the CM170 Fouga Magister, Lockheed T-33 and SF260 SIAI-Marchetti aircraft. The latter being employed at Goetsenhoven, the Squadron operated a detachment at that airfield. Although having received a new designation, the name of the former unit assuming the squadron's mission, "FFM" (Flight de Formation des Moniteurs) stuck until well into the next century. During the following years, the most noteworthy changes were the replacement of the CM170 and T-33 by the Dassault Alpha-Jet as from January 1980 and the transformation of the unit into the Training and Evaluation Center of the Instruction and Training Command on 28 June 1985. Although keeping the same insignia and still being in charge of the training of new instructors, the unit was now a Staff section, detached in the training units. It became more involved in the standardization of the training. On request of the Instruction Command, regular "STANEVAL" inspections were carried out.

In 1993, the Air Force's SF260M were supplemented by 9 SF260D, that were equipped more extensively for instrument flying. Subsequently, the squadron's expert instructors developed a training course for the benefit of those requiring an introduction to civilian IFR flying. This mission also remains with the squadron until the present day.

=== Beauvechain ===
==== 1 Wing ====
On 19 November 1996, all training units were moved to Beauvechain Air Base, a former air defense base. A few years later, on 12 September 2000, the Air Force's Tactical and Training Commands merged into COMOPSAIR, and the TEC was transferred into the structure of 1st Wing. Meanwhile, its instructors took an active part in the integration process of the Alpha Jet avionics update. Although the insignia of the "Green Cocotte" had survived the different changes in organization, the "shadow" squadron number had slipped into oblivion. In early 2001, on request of the CO, Major Conte, the unit obtained once more its squadron number. Nevertheless, on 30 August 2001, the Squadron is disbanded, and the mission of Training and Evaluation Center is taken over by 7 Squadron. From 2001 to 2005, the Training and Evaluation Centre existed as part of the 1st Wing Staff. Although continuing to supervise the training process, the different courses were taken over by the training squadrons. After the move of the Alpha-Jets to Cazaux in 2004, on 14 November 2005, the TEC returned to being a flying unit, and started once more training the new instructors on SF260. Slowly, the unit continued to evolve, first by taking on the IFR course again, later by hosting and supervising the Flying duties of several Staff Officers. This task became even more important after the phasing out of the Fouga Magister in September 2007. To acknowledge the unit's status as a flying squadron, it received the traditions and insignia of 9th Squadron on 21 February 2008.

==== Basic Flying Training School ====
After a further re-organisation of the Belgian Armed Forces, the A109BA helicopters of the Wing Heli, based at Bierset, moved to Beauvechain on 1 September 2010. The name and traditions of 1st Wing were handed over to the helicopter unit.

Both training squadrons (5 and 9) now constitute the Basic Flying Training School. Still based at Beauvechain, this school is now independent of 1st Wing.

Commanding Officers as from Chièvres:

1. DEMEY Lucien : 1952-1953
2. de LIGNE Antoinne: 1953-1955
3. GOOSSE Bruno: 1955-1956
4. MOUZON Léopold: 1956-1957
5. DELBEKE Dries: 1972-1974
6. BIEUVELET Marcel: 1974-1976
7. NUYTS Gustaaf: 1976-1979
8. SCHOUPS Jean-Pierre: 1978-1981
9. RABAEY Jacques: 1981-1982
10. BOURET Marcel: 1982-1983
11. CLAES Ludo: 1983-1985
12. EVRARD Claude: 1985-1985
13. VANDEPUTTE Edgard: 1985-1986
14. MULLER André: 1986-1987
15. DE SUTTER Eddy: 1987-1989
16. MEYNCKENS Lucas: 1989-1991
17. VANTIEGHEM Pascal: 1991-1993
18. PIRSOUL Luc: 1993-1995
19. JAUCOT Luc: 1996-1998
20. CONTE Gilbert: 1998-2001
21. RORIVE Paul: 2001-2005
22. DESIRON Werner: 2005-2010
23. NOPPE Dries: 2010-2011
24. VAN dER LINDEN Sam: 2011-2014
25. COLLARD Alain: 2014- 2016
26. DEROUBAIX Christophe: 2016-2021
27. VAN HERTERIJCK Paul 2021- now
