= André de Meulemeester =

Belgian flying ace

Andre Emile Alphonse De Meulemeester
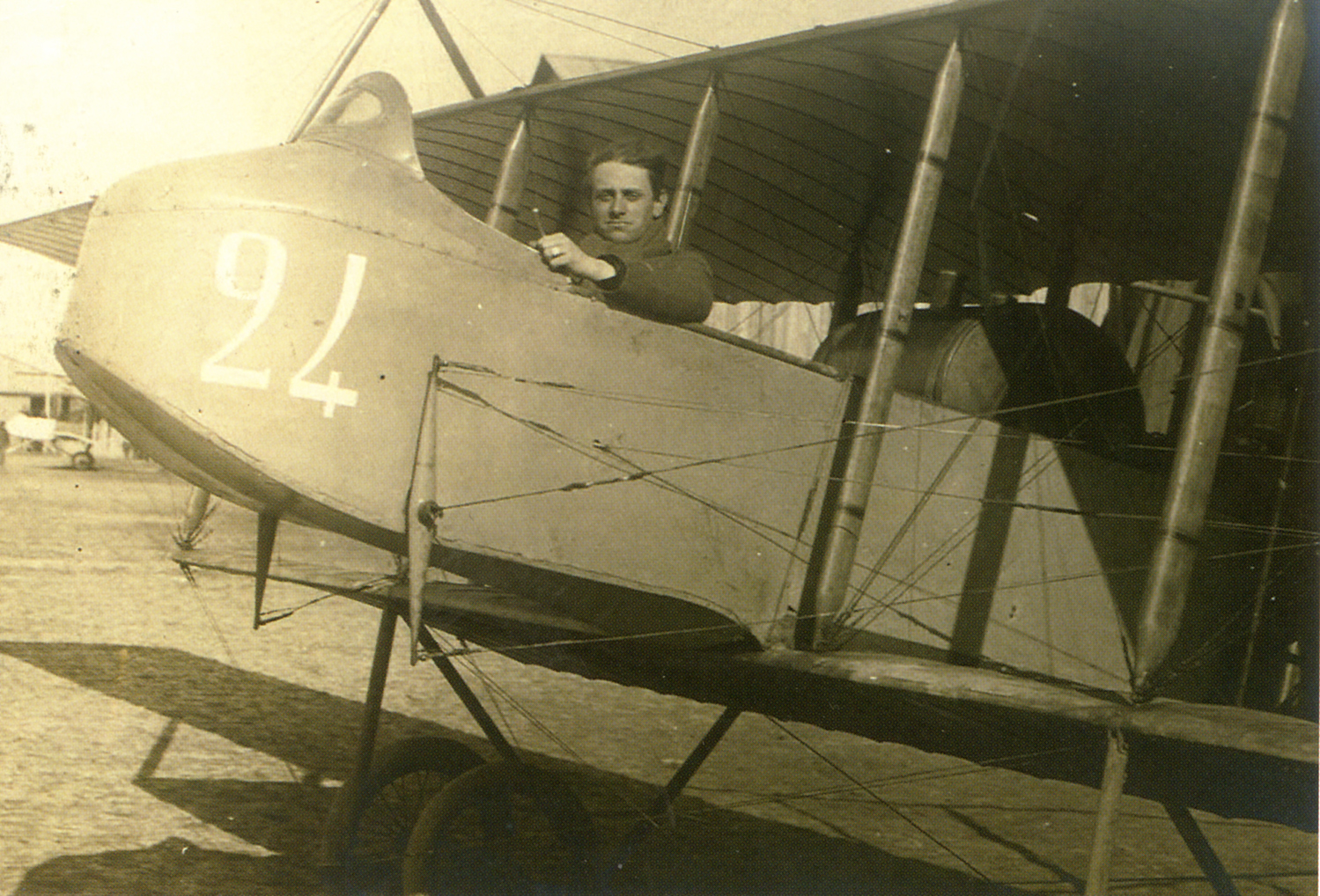
- Born: 28 December 1894; Bruges, Belgium
- Died: 7 March 1973 (aged 78); Bruges, Belgium
- Military career
- Allegiance: Belgium
- Branch: Belgian Air Component
- Service years: 1915 - 1919
- Rank: Lieutenant
- Nickname: Sergeant Mystère
- Units: 1ère Escadrille de Chasse, 9ème Escadrille de Chasse
- Awards: Order of Leopold II, Belgian and French Croix de Guerre, Silver award of Italian Medal for Military Valor

Lieutenant André Emile Alphonse De Meulemeester was a Belgian flying ace during World War I. He was credited with eleven confirmed and nineteen unconfirmed aerial victories.

== Family ==
André De Meulemeester was the son of brewer Victor De Meulemeester (1866–1927), who from 1919 until his death was a senator for the Belgian Labour Party. He was the grandson of brewer Leon De Meulemeester (1841–1922) and Virginie Verstraete.

He married in 1925 with Cécile Graux, granddaughter of Charles Graux, Belgian minister of finances (1878–1884) and the daughter of Charles II Graux, secretary to queen Elisabeth of Belgium. Her sister, Marie-Hélène Graux (1901–1955), married Ernest-John Solvay (1895–1972), son of Ernest Solvay.

The couple lived in a splendid rococo-house along one of the canals in Bruges. They let it often be the scene for motion pictures, amongst them L'empreinte du dieu taken from a novel by Maxence Van Der Meersch and The Nun's Story, with Audrey Hepburn and Peggy Ashcroft.

The De Meulemeesters founded in the sixties a non-profit organization for children in need.

When André died in 1973 only local newspapers echoed his discreet departure. On 9 August 1973 the Festival of Ancient Music dedicated one of its concerts to this generous sponsor (it was a recital at the town hall, given by the British artists Nigel Rogers and Colin Tilney.

== World War I ==
André De Meulemeester joined the Aviation Militaire Belge (Belgian Air Service)) in January 1915. In October 1916, he was assigned to 1ère Escadrille de Chasse as a Nieuport 17 pilot dubbed Sergeant Mystère. He had a victory claim unconfirmed on 1 February 1917, and scored his first official one on 30 April. By the time he scored his sixth and last Nieuport-borne win, on 4 November 1917, he had also accrued nine unconfirmed claims. He then changed up to a Hanriot HD.1. Using his new craft, he managed to score one more confirmed and three more unconfirmed victories before changing squadrons. On 17 March 1918, he scored the first of four confirmed and five unconfirmed victories with 9me Escadrille de Chasse. His eleventh undisputed triumph was as a balloon buster; he destroyed an observation balloon on 5 October 1918.

During the war, he had flown 511 combat sorties, engaged in 185 aerial fights, and been wounded twice.

== Club Mystère ==
Until a few years before his death, De Meulemeester kept alive the comradeship with the Belgian pilots of the Great War. Regularly he invited them at his house for dinners which he offered under the name of 'Club Mystère'. Each time he invited a prominent personality as a guest of honour. They always wrote at length in his Guestbook.

Amongst the guests of honour were Queen Elisabeth of the Belgians, Belgian prime ministers Achiel Van Acker, Paul van Zeeland, Paul-Henri Spaak, Joseph Pholien, Jean Van Houtte, papal nuntii Fernando Cento and Efrem Forni, ministers Camille Gutt, Arthur Gilson, high ranking civil servants, generals, presidents of banks, etc. His list of addresses was quite extensive.

== Brewer ==
When the First World War was over, De Meulemeester quit flying and joined the family brewery. Called 'De Arend' (The Eagle), the brewery was in existence since at least 1553 and was owned by the De Meulemeester family since the early nineteenth century.

The owners, André's father Victor and uncle Alphonse, died both in 1927. The following year the brewery merged with another brewery in Ghent, called 'Belgica'. The new company 'Aigle Belgica' continued its activities mainly in Bruges and André De Meulemeester became chairman of the Board.

Many years later, after his death, the brewery was absorbed by the Belgian brewer Jupiler, soon to merge with Artois into Interbrew, now part of the multinational Inbev.

== Painter ==
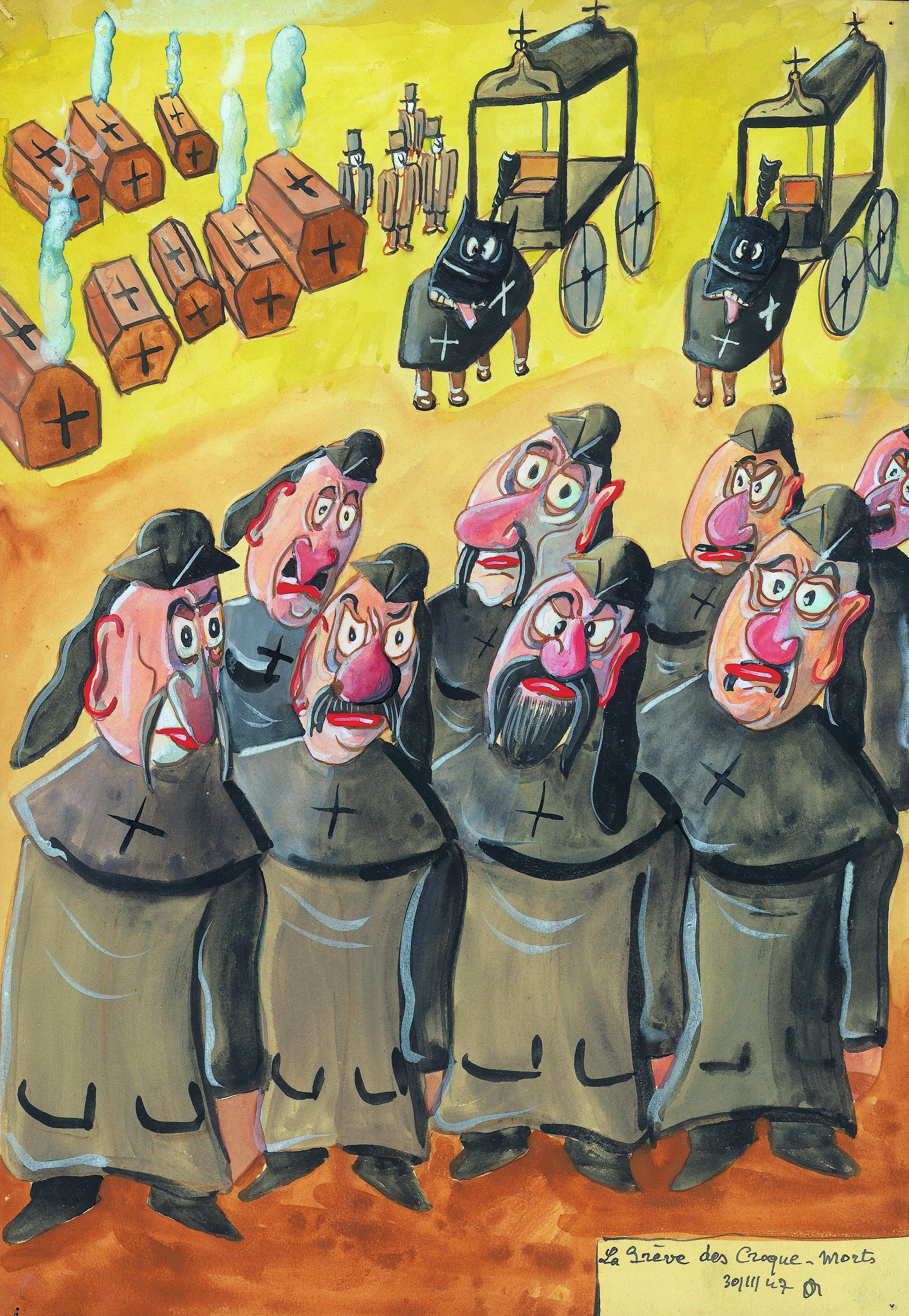
'The undertakers on strike' by André De Meulemeester. (Copyright 2012 Bruges Artroute)

From 1931 until his death, André De Meulemeester devoted discreetly much time to his painting hobby. He left some 1400 drawings and water colour paintings which, in 2009, were donated by Axel Ghyssaert and Anne-Marie De Meulemeester (his only daughter and her husband) to the association Bruges Artroute, which is making an inventory and makes the work known to a larger public.

The honorary curator Jan Hoet described De Meulemeester's work as featuring "mighty colours", "strong work", and "fantastic compositions", and praised the artist's imagination. Hoet also compared aspects of De Meulemeester's work to that of James Ensor and characterized its themes as humorous, sarcastic, and cynical explorations of human nature.

The first exhibitions have already been held in Bruges, in September 2011 and April 2012. National and international presentations will follow.

== See also ==
- List of World War I aces from Belgium

== Literature ==
- Cony, Christophe (May 1999). "André de Meulemeester, l'Aigle des Flanders" [André de Meulemeester, the Eagle of Flanders]. Avions: Toute l'aéronautique et son histoire (in French) (74): 50–56. ISSN 1243-8650.
- Brasserie Aigle Belgica. 400 années d'activité, Brugge, 1953.
- In memoriam André De Meulemeester, in: Brugsch Handelsblad, 10 maart 1973.
- B. VAN DER KLAAUW, Armand VAN ISHOVEN & Peter VAN DER GAAG, De geschiedenis van de Nederlandse en Belgische Luchtvaart, reeks 'De geschiedenis van de luchtvaart', uitg. Lekturama, 1982
- Walter M. PIETERS, Above Flanders' Fields, uitg. Grub Street, 1998
- Norman FRANKS, Nieuport Aces of World War 1, Osprey Publishing, 2000, ISBN 1855329611 ISBN 978-1-85532-961-4.
- Stefan VANKERKHOVEN, De Arend van Vlaanderen, in: Brugsch Handelsblad 13 April 2012, blz. 10-11.
- De Arend van Vlaanderen. André De Meulemeester, gevechtspiloot (1914-1918), industrieel en kunstenaar, Brugge, Provinciaal Tolhuis, 2012.
- Anneleen LYBEER & Geert PROOT, André De Meulemeester. Een stille held huist in de provinciale bibliotheek Tolhuis, in: In de Steigers, jaargang 2012, nr. 1, blz 3-9.
