= Jan Olieslagers =

Belgian flying ace (1883–1942)

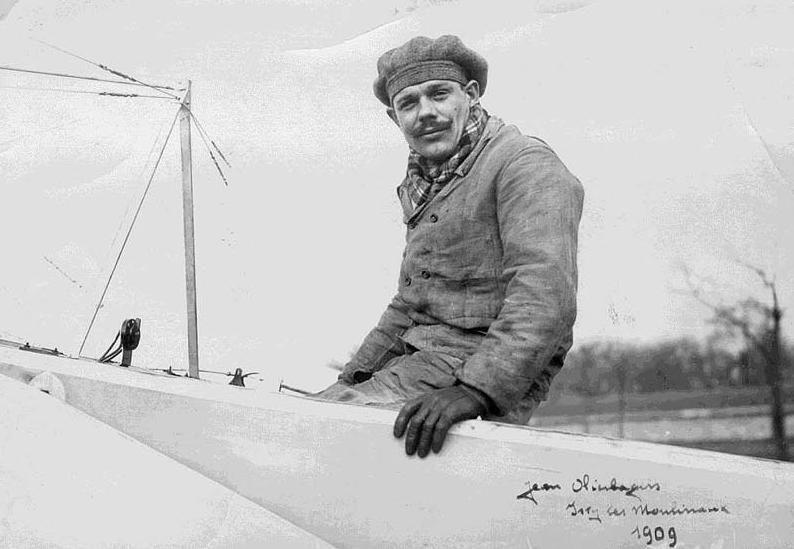
- Jan Olieslagers 1909
- Born: 4 May 1883; Antwerp, Belgium
- Died: 23 March 1942 (aged 58); Antwerp, Belgium
- Military career
- Allegiance: Belgium
- Branch: Belgian Air Component
- Service years: 1914 – 1919
- Rank: Lieutenant
- Nickname: The Antwerp Devil
- Units: 2me Escadrille de Chasse, 5me Escadrille de Chasse, 1ère Escadrille de Chasse, 9ème Escadrille de Chasse
- Awards: Order of Leopold II, Croix de Guerre, French Legion d'Honneur and Croix de Guerre, Russian Order of Saint Stanilas
- Other work: Developed Antwerp airport

Lieutenant Jan Olieslagers was a Belgian motorcycle and aviation pioneer who set world records with both types of machinery. He became a flying ace during World War I despite his indifference in claiming victories; he was credited with six confirmed victories, seventeen unconfirmed, and an unknown number unclaimed. He later was instrumental in developing Antwerp's airport.

Minor planet 9684 is named after him.

== Pre-World War I activities ==
Lieutenant Jan Olieslagers turned in his bicycle to become an early motorcycle speed record holder; he was the first to go 100 kilometers (62 mi) per hour, and was 1902 World Champion. In 1909, he purchased a Blériot monoplane, receiving Pilot's Brevet No. 5 in October. In 1910, he won the Meeting d'Aviation de Rheims. By 1913, he had set seven world aviation records. In June 1914, he proved himself as good an aerobaticist as Roland Garros.

== World War I ==
At the beginning of World War I, when the Germans invaded his native Belgium, the German government tried to enlist Olieslagers in aerial observation duties. He volunteered himself and his Blériot XI airplane to his nation's military, as did his two brothers, Jules and Max. Jan Olieslagers was promoted to Sergeant, then commissioned before the end of 1914.

=== Aerial activities ===
On 5 January 1915, he crashlanded, injuring his left arm and leg, as well as his chest. On 12 September, he became the first Belgian pilot, as well as one of the first pilots overall, to claim an aerial victory, when he forced down an Aviatik C.I. At the time, he was flying a Nieuport 10 dubbed le Demon, which was the only craft in the Belgian air force painted with camouflage markings and the outside circle of the roundels inscribed in black.

He then had a string of four unconfirmed claims before he traded his Nieuport 10 for a Nieuport 11. He scored his second confirmed victory on 17 June 1916, destroying a Fokker D.II over Pijpegale, Belgium. Seven more unconfirmed claims for aerial victories while flying the Nieuport 11 closed out 1917.

Olieslagers seems to have begun 1917 with a newer Nieuport, but with two more unconfirmed victories in his newly acquired Hanriot HD.1. Then, on 14 June, he destroyed a German reconnaissance plane over Schore. The following day, he scored for the fourth time, setting a Fokker D. II afire over Keiem. Two more unconfirmed wins followed. Then, on 4 November 1917, he fainted while flying and crashed onto Les Moeres aerodrome. He was taken to hospital in a coma, but aroused a few days later.

He returned to flight duty in January 1918, but would not score again until 3 May. On that day, he had one of two claims confirmed. On the 19th, he would set an Albatros D.V aflame over Woumen for his last official victory, although he would have one more unverified win.

=== Professional conduct ===
As if Olieslagers' poor record of approvals was not sufficient to keep his score low, he also habitually took the fight to the Germans and was indifferent to the paperwork to staking claims. Although he submitted one combat report on 30 March 1916 for a witnessed triumph behind enemy lines, which went unverified for lack of an officer's confirmation, he usually did not bother with claims for wins behind the German lines.

Jan Olieslagers seldom took leave, although he did visit Colonel Isaac Newton Lewis, the machine gun inventor, in London on many occasions. He tended to busy himself around his home aerodrome and the airplanes assigned to him. He habitually broke in rookie pilots, cushioning their entry into the deadly art of aerial warfare.

=== Aerial career summary ===
Olieslagers was an excellent pilot; he had his brother Jules for a talented mechanic. The combination usually meant a reliable airplane under the ace, but on 9 November 1918, engine problems brought Jan Olieslagers down in a field near Eeklo. It was his 518th and final combat sortie; he had fought in 97 dogfights over a four-year stretch.

== Post World War I ==
Olieslagers was not demobilized until 23 September 1919. He returned home, and opened a garage. On 1 April 1921, he was pensioned off as a reserve Lieutenant. He had not ceased working for his nation; in 1923, he was largely responsible for the opening of the new Antwerp airport. Even today, his statue stands by the entrance.

When Jan Olieslagers died of cancer on 23 March 1942, Belgium was once again occupied by the Germans. Although the Nazis had banned both the playing of the Belgian national anthem and the display of the Belgian flag, as a mark of his nation's regard, Olieslagers' casket was defiantly draped with the flag he had served so well, while the Belgian National Hymn was played in his honor.

== See also ==
- List of World War I aces from Belgium
