= Sint-Truiden / Brustem Airfield =

Airfield in Brustem , Belgium

Sint-Truiden / Brustem Airfield Vliegveld Sint Truiden
- IATA: none; ICAO: EBST

Summary
- Airport type: Military/Private
- Operator: Limburg Regional Airport
- Serves: Sint-Truiden
- Location: Brustem, Belgium
- Elevation AMSL: 238 ft (73 m)
- Coordinates: 50°47′31″N 005°12′06″E

Map
- Location in Belgium

Runways
Direction	Length		Surface
Direction	m	ft	Surface
06L/24R	1,199	3,934	Concrete
06C/24C	530	1,739	Grass
06R/24L	799	2,621	Asphalt
- Sources: Belgian AIP

Sint-Truiden / Brustem Airfield (Dutch: Vliegveld Sint Truiden, ICAO: EBST) is an airfield located in Brustem, 3 km (2 miles) southeast of Sint-Truiden (Limburg) and approximately 60 km (37 miles) east of Brussels. Formerly known as Sint-Truiden Air Base (Dutch: Luchtmachtbasis Sint-Truiden, French: Base Aérienne Saint-Trond) or Brustem Air Base (Dutch: Vliegbasis Brustem, French: Base aérienne de Brustem), the aerodrome was deactivated as a Belgian Air Force base in 1996.

== History ==
Sint-Truiden Air Base was a pre-World War II Belgian Air Force military airfield. It was captured during the Battle of Belgium by the invading German Wehrmacht in May 1940. It turned to civilian status in the early 21st century.

=== German use during World War II ===
During the occupation of Belgium by Nazi Germany, the facility was called "St. Trond" and became a major Luftwaffe air base during the Battle of France. Within a few days of its capture by German forces, the Luftwaffe moved in Sturzkampfgeschwader 77 (SKG 77), a Junkers Ju 87B Stuka dive bomber unit; Zerstörergeschwader 26 (ZG 26), a Messerschmitt Bf 110 heavy fighter (Zerstörer - German for "Destroyer") unit, and two Messerschmitt Bf 109E fighter units Jagdgeschwader 3 (JG 3) and also JG 27.

All of these units took part in the blitzkrieg against French forces and the British Expeditionary Force during the Battle of France in late May and June. All also moved forward to French bases by the end of June.

With the combat on the Continent ended, Brustem became a Luftwaffe bomber base, with Kampfgeschwader 3 (KG 3) flying Dornier Do 17 light bombers from the airfield. KG 3 arrived at the end of June 1940 and took part in the Battle of Britain during the summer, then later, switching to night bombing of English targets, remaining until March 1941.

Increasing numbers of night bombing raids on Germany by the Royal Air Force (RAF) in 1941 caused the Luftwaffe to start transitioning from a purely offensive force, to performing night air defense. Nachtjagdgeschwader 1 (NJG 1) arrived at Brustem in May 1941, and until March 1944 flew first Messerschmitt Bf 110s, then after March 1942, Radar-equipped Dornier Do 217 night interceptors against the RAF bombers.

Heinz-Wolfgang Schnaufer, a German Luftwaffe night-fighter pilot and the highest-scoring night fighter ace in the history of aerial warfare, was based at Sint-Truiden at various times during the war. His 121 victories were claimed mostly against British four-engine bombers operated by RAF Bomber Command.

On 15 August 1944, RAF Bomber Command aircraft attacked Sint-Truiden in a daylight raid. The attacking RAF crews were aware of the field's use by German night fighters.

In August 1944, Jagdgeschwader 2 (JG 2) began flying Focke-Wulf Fw 190A day interceptors, remaining until September when the Luftwaffe was forcefully removed from the base by advancing Allied ground forces.

Sint-Truiden Air Base was a frequent target of United States Army Air Forces (USAAF) Ninth Air Force Martin B-26 Marauder medium bombers. The medium bombers would attack in coordinated raids, usually in the mid-to-late afternoon, with Eighth Air Force heavy bombers returning from attacking their targets in Germany. The attack was timed to have the maximum effect possible to keep the Luftwaffe interceptors pinned down on the ground and be unable to attack the heavy bombers. Also, the Republic P-47 Thunderbolts of Ninth Air Force would be dispatched to perform fighter sweeps over Brustem after the Marauder raids, then meet up with the heavy bombers and provide fighter escort back to England. As the North American P-51 Mustang groups of Eighth Air Force began accompanying the heavy bombers all the way to their German targets by mid-1944, it was routine for them to also attack Brustem on their return to England with a fighter sweep and attack any target of opportunity to be found at the airfield.

==== Allied use ====
The airfield was seized from the Germans by Allied ground forces on 15 September 1944. Once in American hands, combat engineers of the IX Engineer Command 834th Engineer Aviation Battalion repaired the damaged airfield and applied numerous patches to the two concrete runways and taxiways of the field. It was declared operationally ready for combat units on 18 September, only a few days after its capture from German forces, being designated as Advanced Landing Ground A-92 or "Saint Trond Airfield".

Although operationally usable, Brustem was a wrecked base from the numerous Allied air attacks since late 1942 and what was blown up by the Germans as they withdrew. The Americans made do with what could be repaired, with the 832nd Engineer Aviation Battalion moving in what equipment was necessary to conduct combat operations.

Under Allied control, the American Ninth Air Force used the base for several units from 7 September 1944 until closing it in July 1945. RAF units also operated from the base, known by the British as ALG "B-62". Known Ninth Air Force units assigned were:

- 48th Fighter Group, 30 September 1944 – 26 March 1945 (P-47)
- 404th Fighter Group, 4 October 1944 – 30 March 1945 (P-47)
- 386th Bombardment Group, 9 April–27 July 1945 (A-26/B-26)

After combat ended in May 1945, Brustem was used as a relief distribution base, with the Allies flying in food, clothing and other needs, and using the base to distribute these supplies in Belgium and other occupied areas in the region. The airfield was returned to Belgian control in September 1945.

==== Postwar/current use ====
Sint-Truiden Air Base took many years to rebuild after the war, however in 1946, military operations resumed from the base. A new jet runway (06/24) was laid down and the support area was completely rebuilt, although the wartime runways were resurfaced and remained in use for non-jet aircraft.

From 1971 on, several training squadrons were based at Sint-Truiden. Initially, 7th Squadron and 9th Squadron operated the CM170 Fouga Magister, while 11th Squadron operated the Lockheed T-33. With the arrival of the Dassault Alpha-Jet in 1980, 7th Squadron and 11th Squadron started training their students on this aircraft. 33rd Squadron was created to continue operating the CM170 Fouga Magister.

In 1996, the base was closed as an operational airfield, and all training squadrons moved to Beauvechain Air Base.

Nowadays private investors are rebranding the airfield into a regional airport, named Limburg Regional Airport (LRA). There will be construction of an airport hotel, new control tower and lots other facilities, the works started in 2012. Not all these projects have materialised as of 2019.

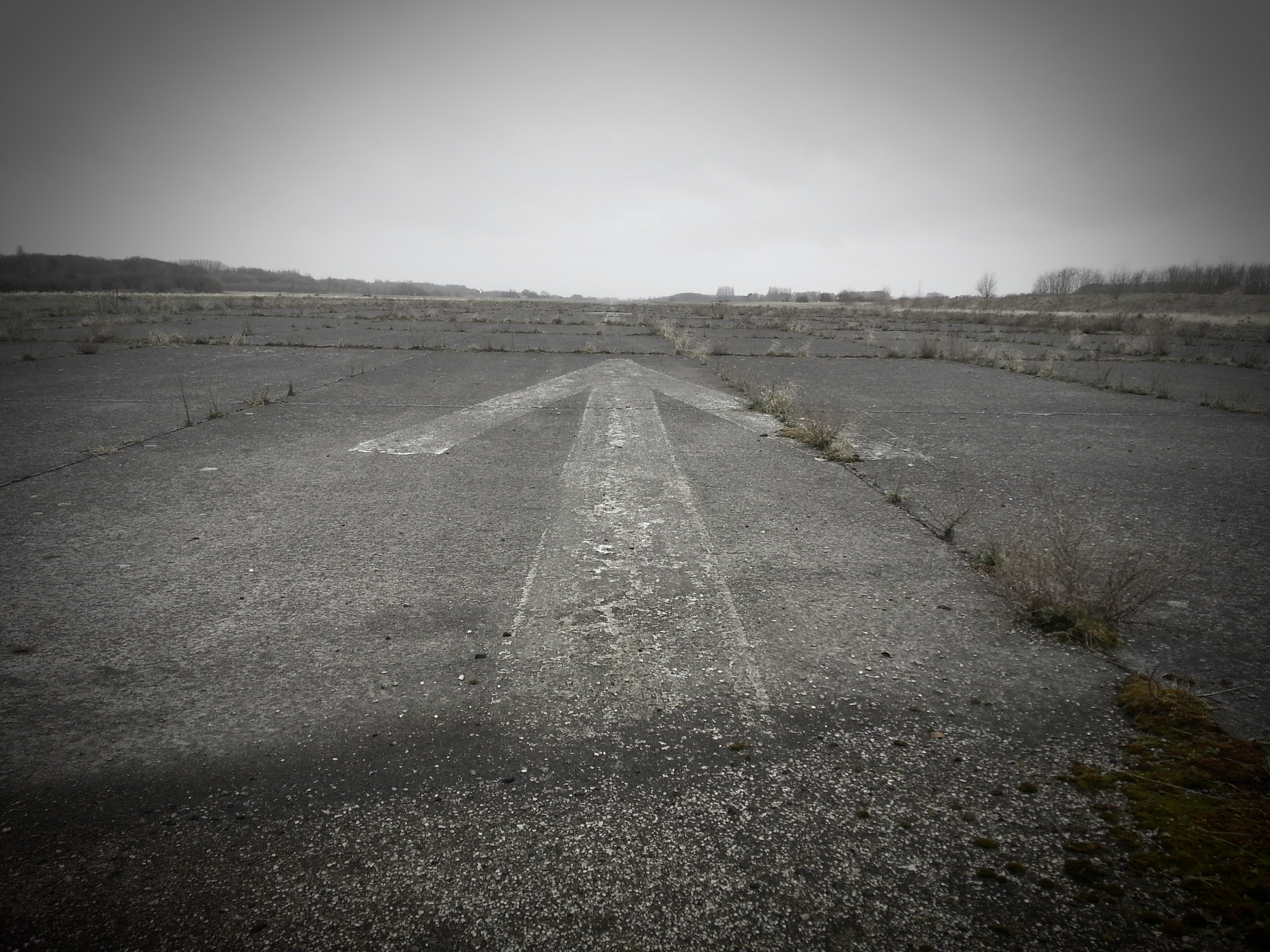
Runway Airport Brustem

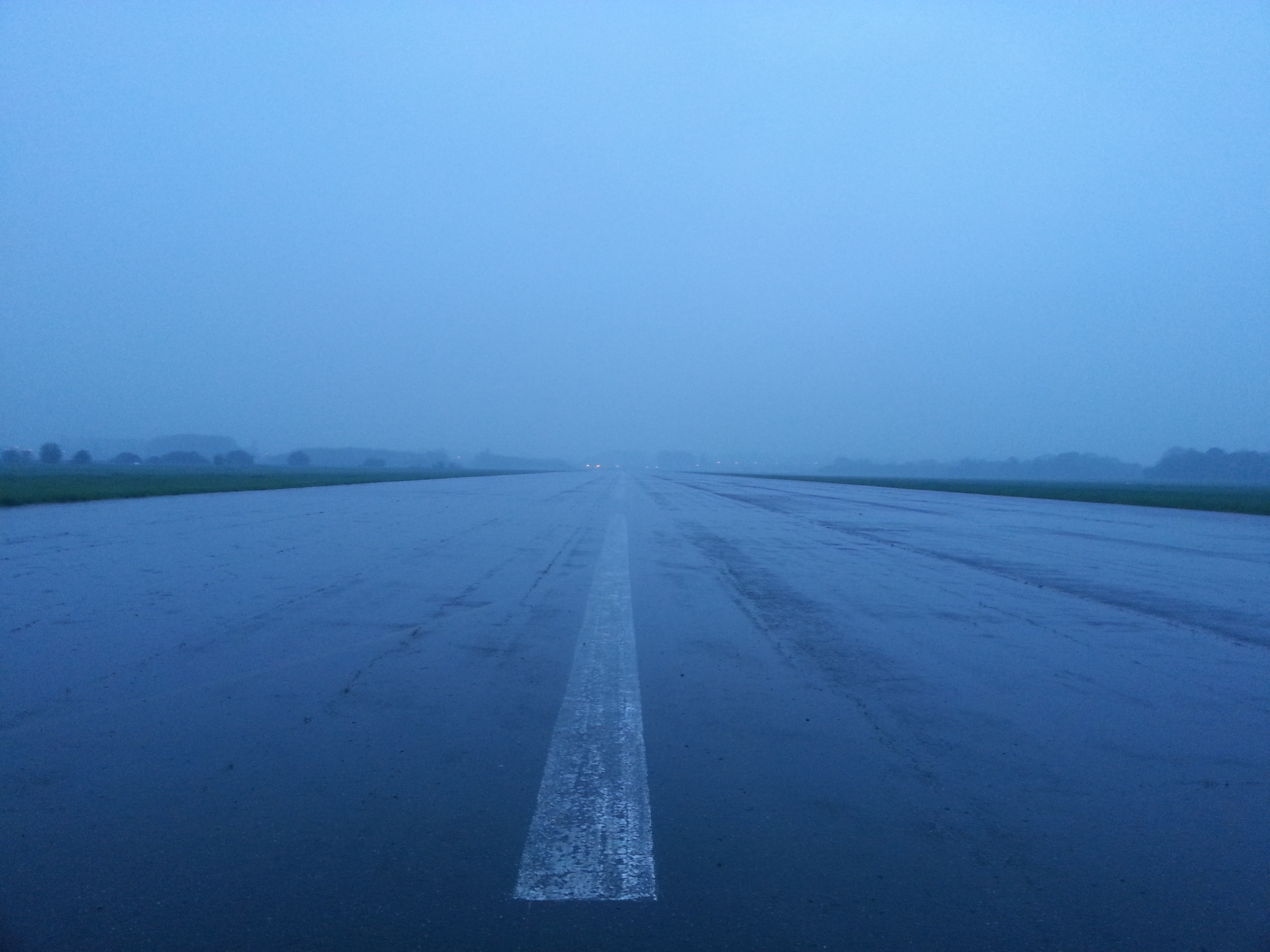
Runway Airport Brustem in the evening

== See also ==
- Advanced Landing Ground
