= 1st Squadron (Belgium) =

- Active: 16 April 1913
- Country: Belgium
- Branch: Belgian Air Force
- Part of: 2nd Tactical Wing
- Motto: Nemo me impune lacessit (No one provokes me with impunity) (Latin)

Commanders
- Commander: Colonel V. Maniet

Aircraft flown
- Fighter: F-35A Lightning II

The 1st Squadron (French: 1^{re} escadrille) is a Recce squadron in the Belgian Air Force of the Belgian Armed Forces. Based at Florennes air base, it is part of the 2nd Tactical Wing and operates the F-35A Lightning II.

The 1re Escadrille de Chasse was the first fighter squadron of the Belgian Air Force. The squadron was founded during World War I, reorganized into a dedicated fighter unit, and became part of a fighter wing before war's end.

== History ==
=== The origins ===
The 1re Escadrille de Chasse was founded in February 1916 as the first dedicated squadron of the Aviation Militaire Belge. It drew upon the men and equipment of the previously existing provisional Escadrille I. In August 1917, upon receiving the new Hanriot-Dupont 1 aircraft, the first version of the famous “Thistle” symbol was designed by André de Meulemeester as the squadron's insignia, to be painted on the aircraft. He also selected the squadron motto “Nemo me impune lacessit” or “No-one can challenge me unpunished”. In March 1918, it would be reorganized into the 9ème Escadrille.

=== Aerodromes / Airbases ===
- Coxyde: February 1916 - June 1916
- Les Moeres: June 1916 - March 1918
- Florennes : 1947 - 1971
- Bierset : 1971 - 1989
- Florennes : 1989 - Present

=== Notable personnel ===
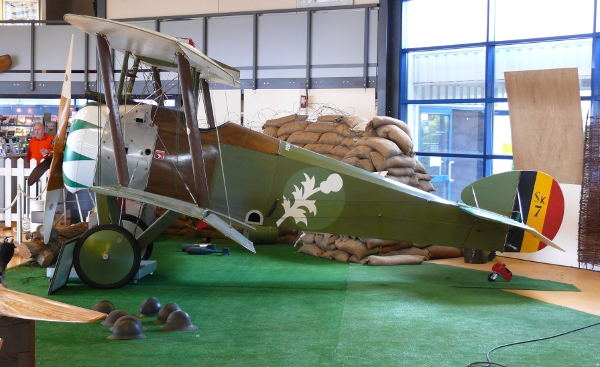
Sopwith Camel in the markings of 1st Squadron.

- André de Meulemeester
- Fernand Jacquet
- Jan Olieslagers
- Willy Coppens

=== Aircraft used ===
- Nieuport 10
- Nieuport Scout
- Nieuport 16
- Nieuport 17
- Hanriot HD.1
- Sopwith Camel
- Spitfire Mk.XIV
- F-84 E/G/F
- Mirage 5BA
- F-16 Fighting Falcon
- F-35A Lightning II (since 13 October 2025)

=== Operations ===
At the start of World War I, Belgium was neutral. An overwhelming invasion by the German army left Belgium partially occupied by the end of 1914, with its preserved territory shielded by deliberate defensive flooding at Nieuwpoort by the Belgians. As a result, the Aviation Militaire Belge was based in the diminished remnant of a small country, and performed largely in a static defensive mode.
Captain Fernand Jacquet and Lieutenant Louis Robin scored the squadron's first victory on 20 May 1916. It would claim 52 aerial victories and be credited with 15, at a blood cost of five Belgian pilots killed in action and one accidental death.

== Present day ==
After World War II, the modern Belgian Air Force was founded in 1946. The "Thistle" was accorded to 351 Squadron of 161st Wing at Florennes air base. On 10 January 1948 this unit became 1st Squadron of 2nd Wing. From that day to the present, the squadron shares the identity and the traditions of the 1ère Escadrille de Chasse of 1917 . In July 1971, 1 Squadron leaves Florennes for Bierset, to constitute 3rd Wing together with 8 Squadron. Designated to transform to the F-16, the unit swaps bases with 42 Squadron of Florennes in 1989.

In July 2025, it was confirmed that 1 Squadron will be the first Belgian F-35A squadron and deliveries are expected to begin in late 2025.
