= Nieuport 10 =

French WW1 aircraft

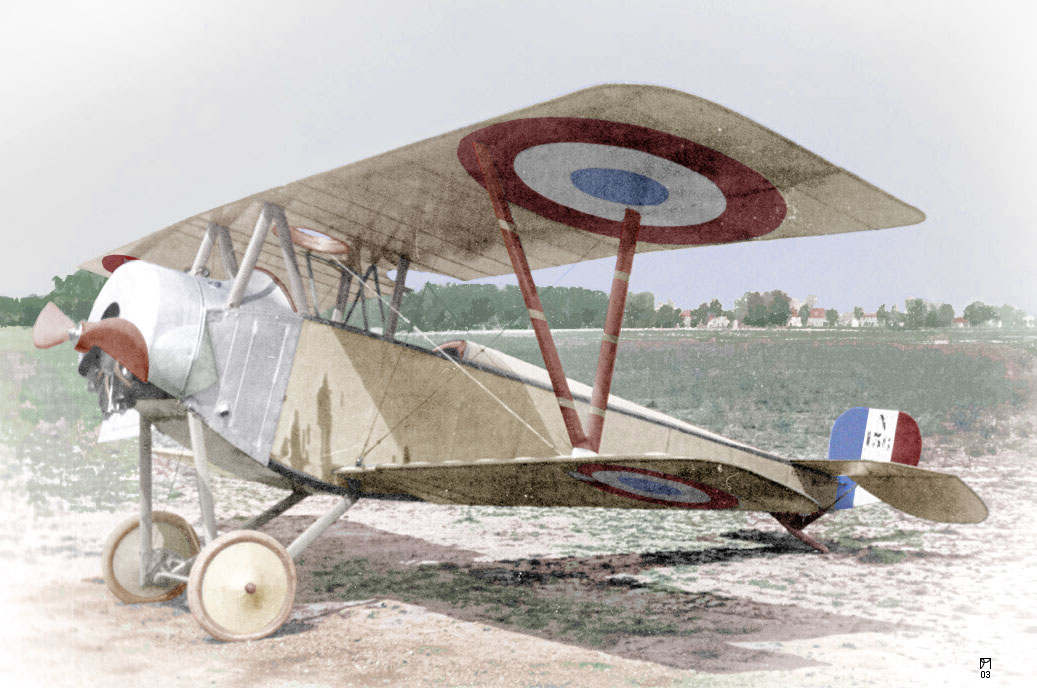

General information
- Type: reconnaissance, fighter and trainer
- Manufacturer: Nieuport
- Designer: Gustave Delage
- Status: retired
- Primary users: Aéronautique Militaire Royal Naval Air Service; Imperial Russian Air Service

History
- Manufactured: 1915-1918
- Introduction date: 1915
- First flight: 1914
- Variant: Nieuport 12

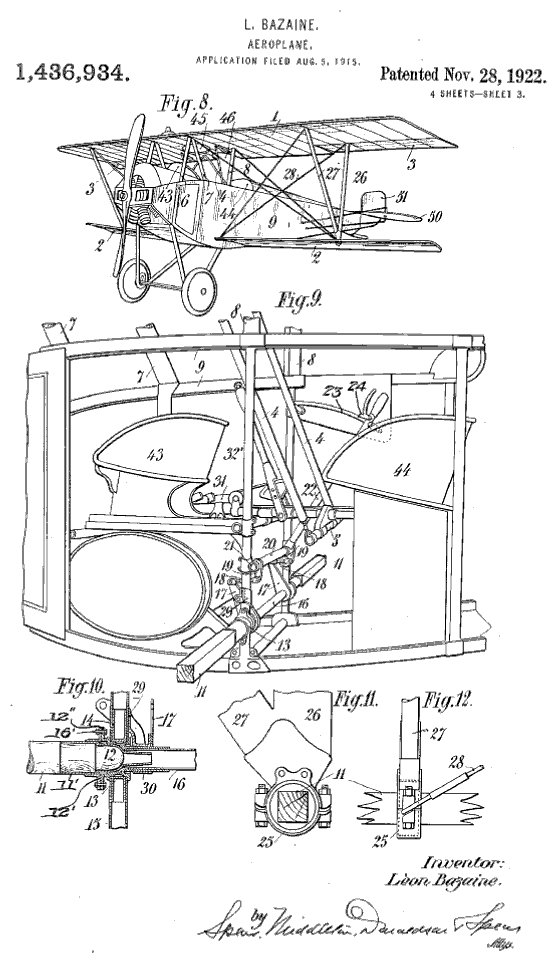
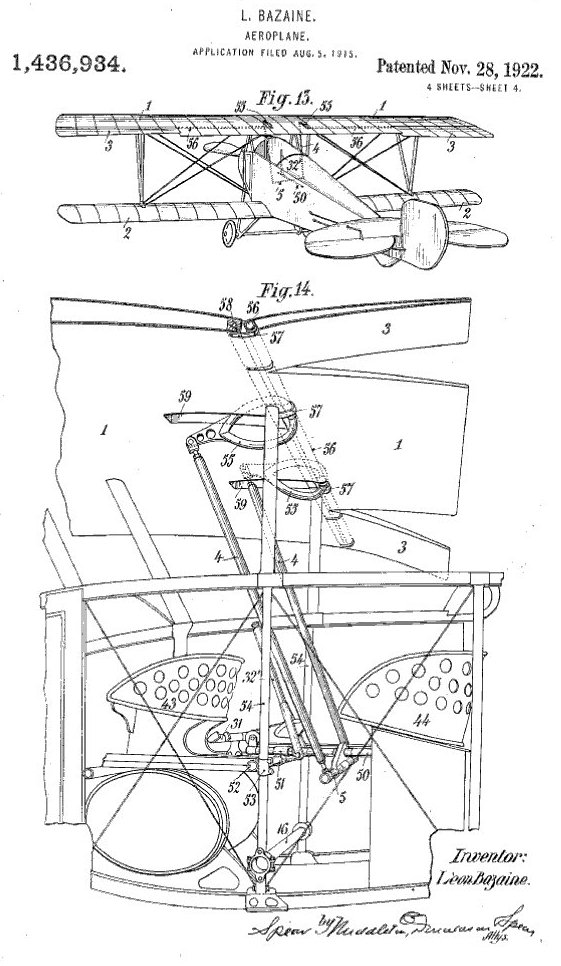
Nieuport 10 wing and aileron details

The Nieuport 10 (or Nieuport XB in contemporary sources) is a French First World War sesquiplane that filled a wide variety of roles, including reconnaissance, fighter and trainer.

== Design and development ==
In January 1914, designer Gustave Delage joined the Société Anonyme des Etablissements Nieuport, and started working on a series of aircraft that would remain in production for the remainder of the First World War. The Nieuport 10 was the first of these and was originally designed to compete in the Gordon Bennett Trophy race of 1914. World War I caused this contest to be cancelled, and the type was developed as a military two-seat reconnaissance aircraft that entered service in 1915.

The type featured a distinctive "V" strut layout. The lower wing was much smaller in area than the upper wing. The concept was intended to combine the strength, compactness and stability of the biplane's wire braced wing cell with the speed and ease of handling of the monoplane.

Many were built or converted as single-seat fighters by covering the front cockpit, and adding a Lewis Gun or Vickers machine gun either to fire through the centre section of the top wing or mounted over it, firing forwards. In this form, the type was used as a fighter.

Two major types were developed based on experience with the Nieuport 10 - the Nieuport 11 Bébé - a smaller and completely new aircraft, designed from the outset as a single-seater, and the Nieuport 12 - a more powerful two-seater with an enlarged top wing and improved seating for the gunner. In addition, production was undertaken later in the war of a dedicated trainer version under the Nieuport 83 E.2 designation with detail changes. A single example of a triplane, using a Nieuport 10 fuselage was built to test an unusual staggered wing concept.

== Operational use ==
Many of the early French aces flew the Nieuport 10, the best known of which was Georges Guynemer, who used several Nieuport 10s, all marked "Vieux Charles". Jan Olieslagers was flying a Nieuport 10 when he became the first Belgian to shoot down another aircraft, while the first Canadian aerial victory was also scored in a Nieuport 10, by Flight Sub-Lieutenant Arthur Ince.

== Variants ==
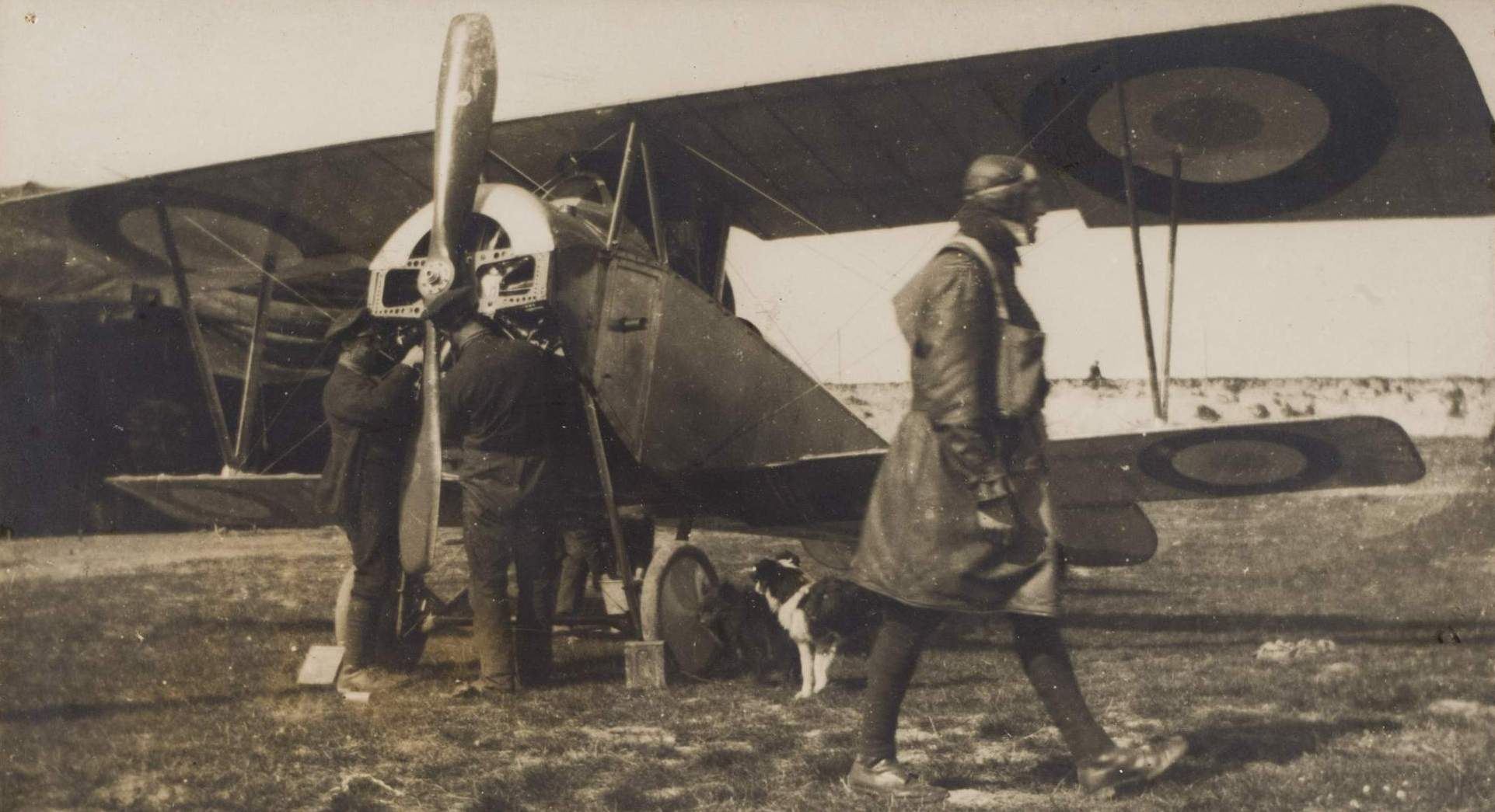
Early French Nieuport X.B reconnaissance aircraft

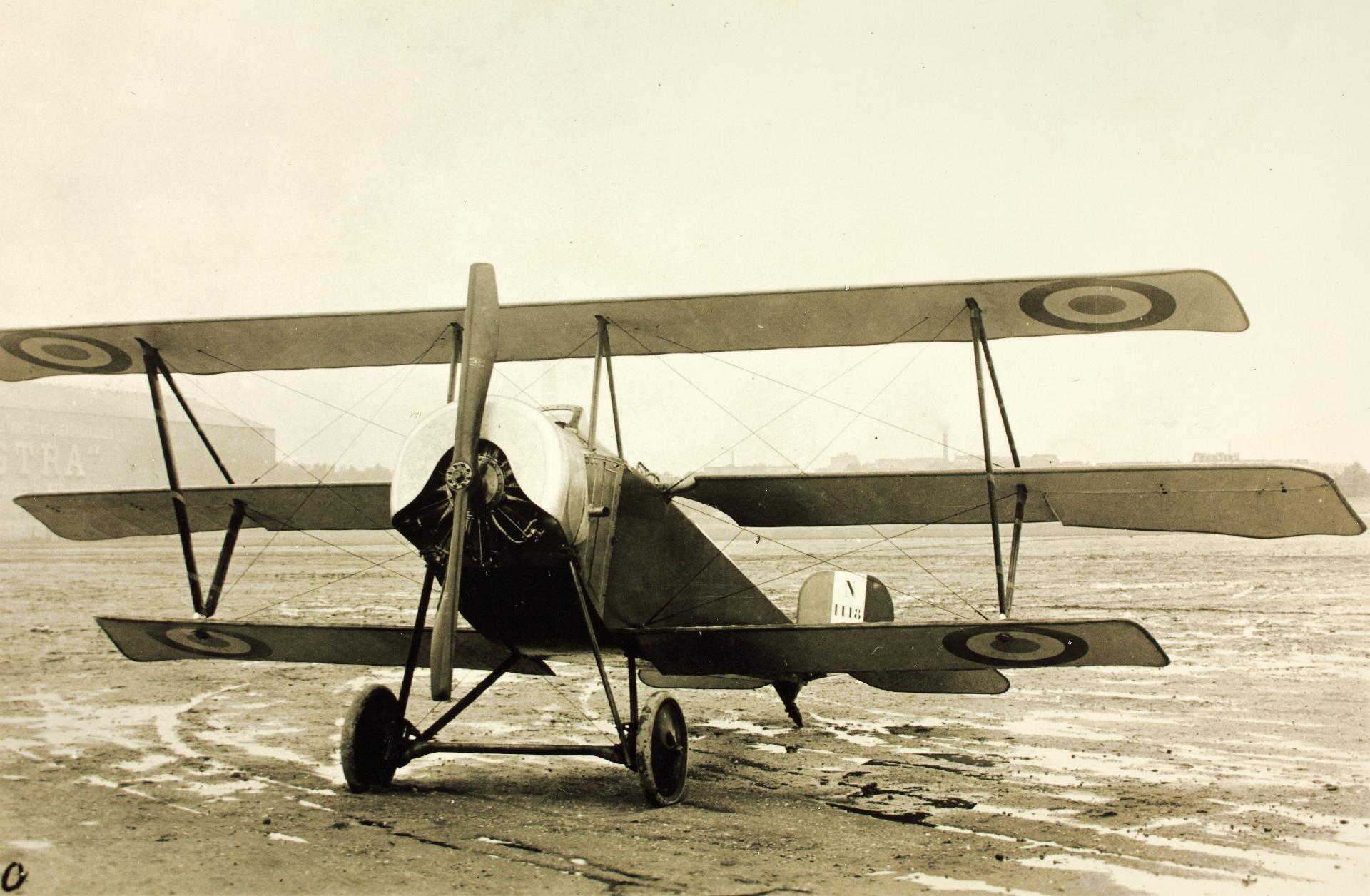
Nieuport 10 triplane

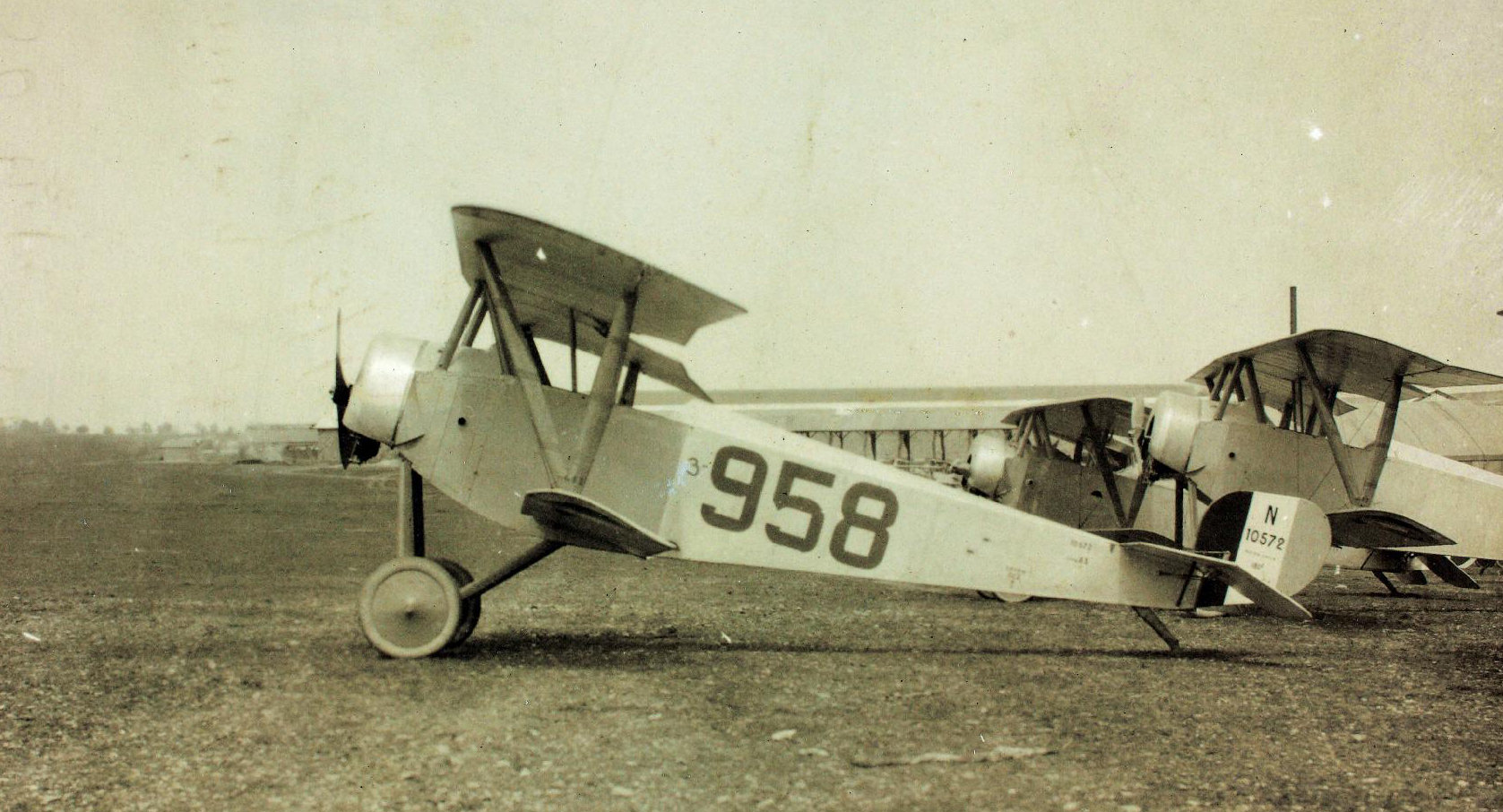
American Nieuport 83 E.2 trainer

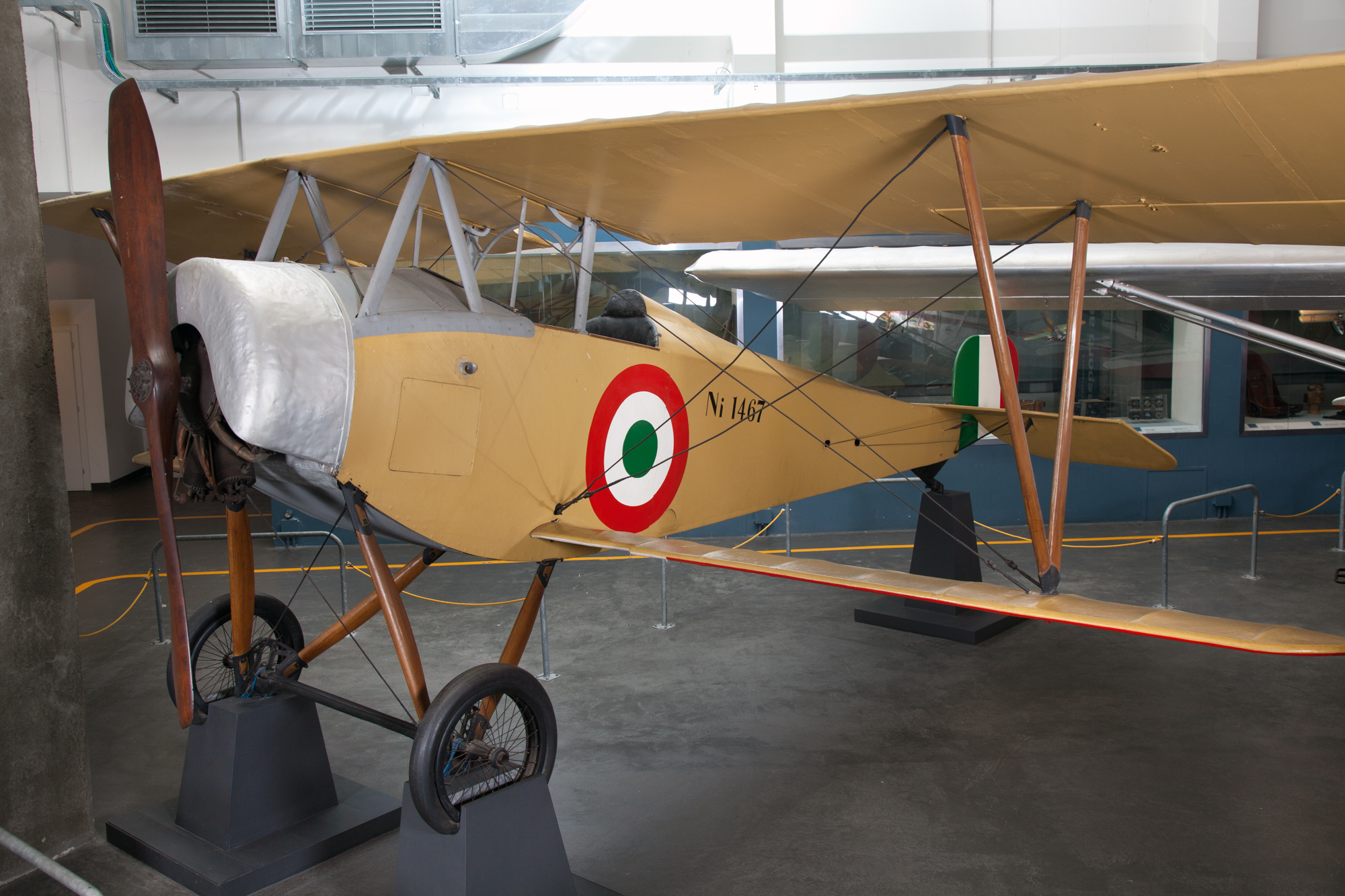
Nieuport-Macchi Ni.10 at the Museo nazionale della scienza e della tecnologia Leonardo da Vinci in Milan.

Nieuport X.B
Early designation distinguishing it from the earlier unrelated Nieuport X monoplane.
Nieuport X.AV
Company designation with the observer/gunner seated in the front and the pilot in the rear.
Nieuport X.AR
Company designation with the pilot seated in the front and the observer/gunner in the rear.
Nieuport 10 A.2
Two-seat reconnaissance (Artillerie) aircraft, same as Nieuport X.AR.
Nieuport 10 C.1
Single-seat fighter variant. Inspired development of Nieuport 11 C.1.
Nieuport 10 E.2
Nieuport 10 A.2s used for training.
Nieuport 83 E.2
Purpose-built trainer with detail modifications.
Nieuport 10 triplane

Testbed for triplane with unusual wing stagger.
Nieuport-Macchi 10.000
Italian-built Nieuport 10 with many detail modifications.
Nieuport 18 or 18 meter Nieuport
Unofficial description of basic type based on nominal wing area of 18 square meters.
Nakajima Army Type 甲 2 (Ko 2) Trainer
Nieuport 83 E.2 built under licence in Japan.
B.F.2 (training aircraft type 2)
Siamese designation for imported Nieuport 83 E.2.

== Operators ==
Belgium
Belgian Air Force
Brazil
Brazilian Air Force
France
Aéronautique Militaire
Aéronavale
Finland
Finnish Air Force (ex-Russian examples)
Finnish Socialist Workers' Republic
Red Guards (ex-Russian examples)
Kingdom of Italy
Corpo Aeronautico Militare
Japan
Imperial Japanese Army Air Service
Portugal
Aeronáutica Militar Portuguesa - 7 Nieuport Ni.83E-2 trainers received in 1917.
Romania
Romanian Air Corps - one Nieuport 10 purchased in 1915, used as trainer.
Russian Empire
Imperial Russian Air Service - imported large numbers and built under licence.
Imperial Russian Navy - ex Air Service aircraft.
Serbia
Serbian Air Force

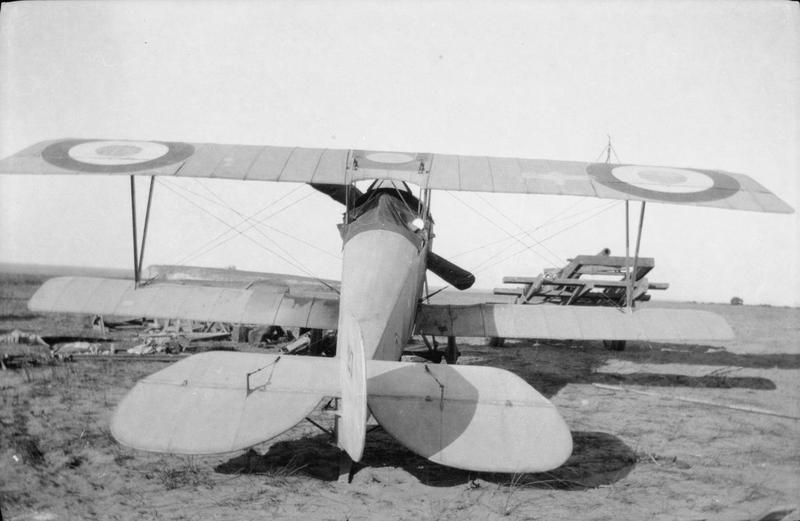
British Royal Naval Air Service Nieuport 10 showing the original small tailplane and cutout in the top wing for the gunner.

(Thailand) Siam

- Royal Siamese Aeronautical Service

Ukrainian People's Republic
Ukrainian People's Army (One aircraft only)
United Kingdom
Royal Naval Air Service - early user. Note that the Royal Flying Corps did not use the Nieuport 10.
United States
United States Air Service of the American Expeditionary Force - used as trainers only
Soviet Union
Workers' and Peasants' Air Fleet (ex-Russian examples)

== Surviving aircraft ==
Two Nieuport-Macchi 10,000's survive and are on display in Italy, one at the Museo Storico Italiano della Guerra and one at the Museo della Scienza e della Tecnologia "Leonardo da Vinci", and an original Nieuport 83 E.2 that had been flown by Charles Nungesser while barnstorming in the United States shortly after the First World War, is at Old Rhinebeck Aerodrome on static display.

== Specifications (Nieuport-Macchi 10) ==
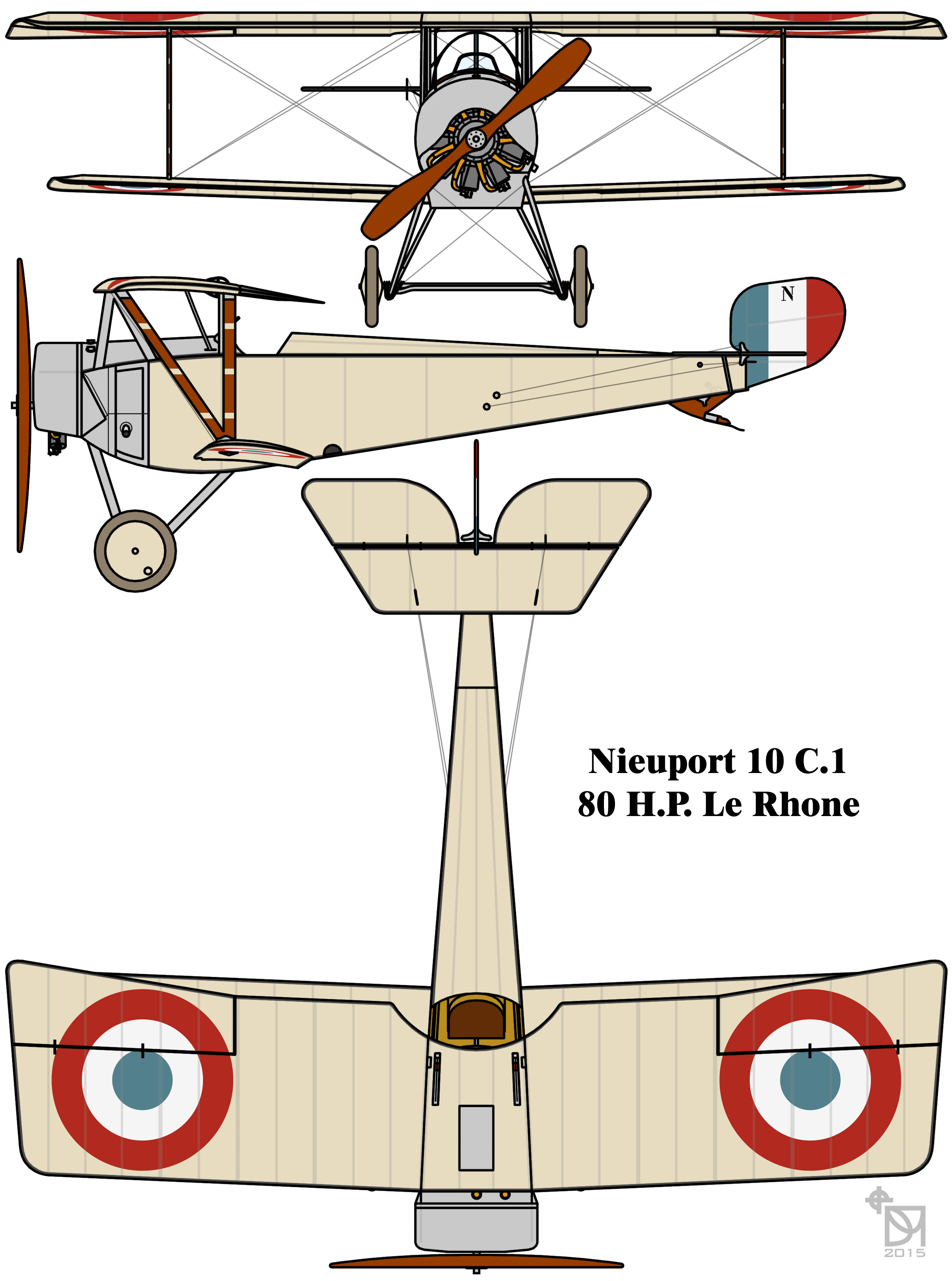
Drawing of definitive Nieuport 10 C.1 fighter

Data from Nieuport Macchi 11 & 17 and French Aircraft of the First World War

General characteristics

- Crew: Two
- Length: 7.01 m (23 ft 0 in)
- Upper wingspan: 8.03 m (26 ft 4 in)
- Upper chord: 1.61 m (5 ft 3 in)
- Wing sweep: 2° 45'
- Lower wingspan: 7.51 m (24 ft 8 in)
- Lower chord: 0.90 m (2 ft 11 in)
- Height: 2.85 m (9 ft 4 in)
- Wing area: 18 m^{2} (190 sq ft)
- Empty weight: 440 kg (970 lb)
- Gross weight: 650 kg (1,433 lb)
- Undercarriage track: 1.60 m (5 ft 3 in)
- Powerplant: 1 × le Rhône 9C 9-cylinder air-cooled rotary piston engine, 60 kW (80 hp)
- Propellers: 2-bladed fixed-pitch Régy 155 or Chauviere 2219 propeller, 2.5 m (8 ft 2 in) diameter

Performance

- Maximum speed: 140 km/h (87 mph, 76 kn)
- Range: 300 km (190 mi, 160 nmi)
- Endurance: 2 hours 30 minutes
- Service ceiling: 4,000 m (13,000 ft)
- Time to altitude: 15 minutes 30 seconds to 2,000 m (6,600 ft)
- Wing loading: 36.1 kg/m^{2} (7.4 lb/sq ft)

Armament

- Guns: 1 × .303 in (7.70 mm) Lewis machine gun or 7.9 mm (0.31 in) Hotchkiss mounted above the top wing

== See also ==
- 1914 in aviation

Related lists

- List of military aircraft of France
- List of fighter aircraft
