= Willy Coppens =

Belgian fighter ace (1892–1986)

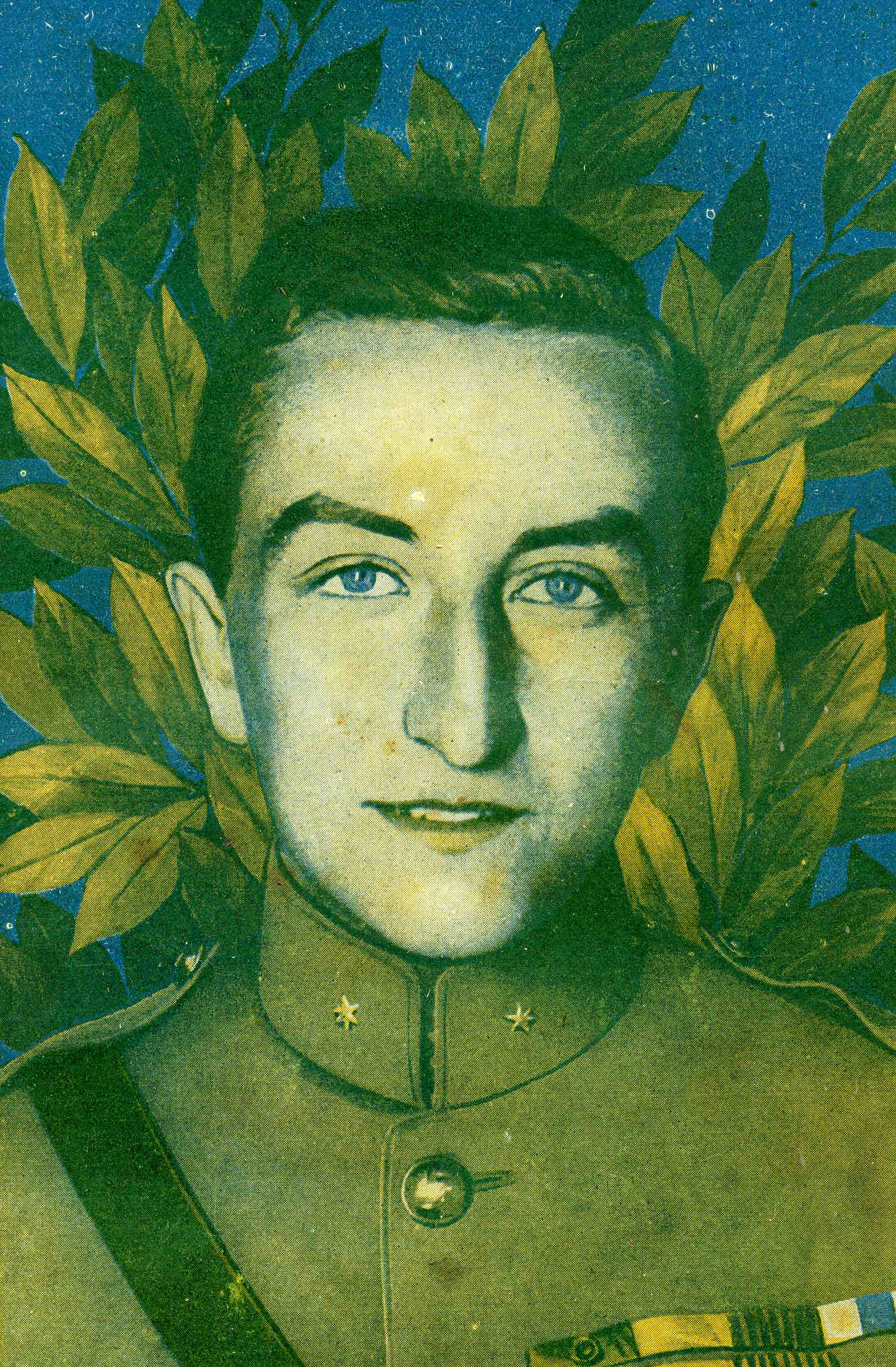
- Born: Willy Omer François Jean Coppens; 6 July 1892; Watermael-Boitsfort, Brussels, Belgium
- Died: 21 December 1986 (aged 94); De Panne, West Flanders, Belgium
- Military career
- Allegiance: Belgium
- Branch: Grenadiers, Compagnie des Aviateurs
- Service years: 1912–1940
- Rank: Major
- Units: 2nd Grenadiers, 1ère Escadrille de Chasse, 9ème Escadrille de Chasse, Escadrilles (Squadrons) 4, 6
- Awards: Order of Leopold II, Order of the Crown, Belgian Croix de Guerre, French Legion d'Honneur, Serbian Order of the White Eagle, British Distinguished Service Order, British Military Cross, French Croix de Guerre

Willy Omer François Jean baron Coppens de Houthulst, DSO MC (6 July 1892 – 21 December 1986) was Belgium's leading fighter ace and the champion "balloon buster" of World War I. He was credited with 37 confirmed victories and six probables.

== Early life ==
Coppens was born in Watermael-Boitsfort, son of Omer Coppens, a Belgian impressionistic painter who studied in the Royal Academy of Ghent. The younger Coppens was conscripted into the army in 1912, serving with the Premier Regiment de Grenadiers.

== World War I ==
In 1914, following the German invasion of Belgium, Coppens transferred to the Motor Machine Gun Corps. On 6 September 1915, he signed up for flight training in the Compagnie des Aviateurs. As a result of shortcomings in Belgium's training, he needed eight weeks of leave to learn to fly. Coppens and 39 other Belgians learned to fly on their own expense in Great Britain. He received his pilot's certificate on 9 December 1915. After finishing in Britain, Coppens underwent further training at the Farman School in Étampes, France, and joined the Sixieme Escradrille as a sergent 1st class (Sergeant First Class) on 8 April 1917, flying BE-2c two seaters. Later that month, he was assigned to Quatrieme Escadrille, flying a Farman pusher. On 1 May, he received a Sopwith 1½ Strutter two seater, which he flew during his first aerial combat.

In mid July, he transferred to the single seater fighter unit 1ère Escadrille de Chasse (1st Pursuit Squadron). He received the last remaining Nieuport 16 in the squadron; everyone else had upgraded to Nieuport 17s. When Hanriot HD.1s were offered to the squadron, he was the only pilot to initially accept one. His enthusiasm for the aircraft type prompted other pilots to also move over to Hanriots.

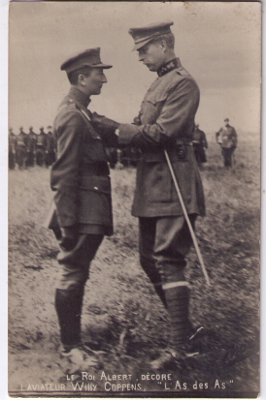
Willy Coppens is decorated by King Albert I.

On 19 August Coppens was promoted to Adjudant. He continued his nervy but unsuccessful combat career against enemy aircraft until 17 March 1918. On that day he carried out his first attack on German observation balloons, as an aid to a ground assault by the Belgian Army. Though handicapped by lack of incendiary ammunition he punctured two balloons, causing the observers to bail out and the balloons to collapse to the ground.

Finally, on 25 April Coppens scored his first victory by downing a Rumpler two seater. On 8 May he finally found his metier, when he shot two balloons down in flames.

A week later, using his usual tactics of close range fire, Coppens cut a balloon loose from its ties. It bounced up beneath him and momentarily carried his Hanriot skyward. After his aircraft fell off the balloon, he restarted its engine and flew back to base. The balloon sagged into an explosion.

From then on, Coppens' record was spectacular. Between April and October 1918 he was credited with destroying 34 German observation balloons and three airplanes, nearly as many victories as Belgium's other five aces combined. Unlike most fighter pilots of World War I, who used .303 caliber or 7.92 mm guns, Coppens used a larger bore 11 mm Vickers machine gun, having upgraded his weaponry prior to June 1918.

In June, he was promoted to sous lieutenant, thus becoming an officer. His royal blue plane with its insignia of a thistle sprig wearing a top hat became so well known that the Germans went to special pains to try to kill him. On 3 August he shot down a balloon booby-trapped with explosives that when detonated from the ground narrowly missed killing him. The flaming wreckage of the balloon "fell swift as doom on the watching [German] staff officers, killing many and injuring the rest".

On his last mission, 14 October, Coppens downed a balloon over Praatbos and was attacking one over Torhout when he was severely wounded by an incendiary bullet, smashing the tibia of his left leg and severing the artery. Coppens crash landed near Diksmuide and was taken to hospital, where his leg was amputated.

Coppens achieved all his victories flying a Hanriot HD.1 fighter.

== After the war ==
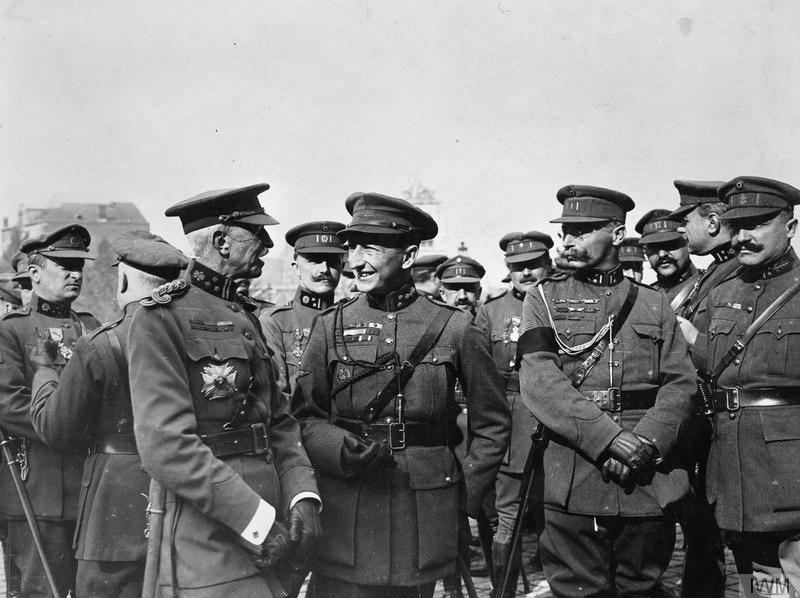
Coppens (centre), pictured in 1919

For his wartime service he was knighted, becoming Willy Omer Francois Jean Coppens de Houthulst, for a forest in his squadron's operating area. He was decorated by Belgium, France, Britain, Portugal, Italy, Poland, and Serbia. His memoir, Days on the Wing, were published in 1931 and reissued in the 1970s as Flying in Flanders.

Between the two World Wars Coppens was Belgian air attaché to four nations. In September 1928, despite his disability, he set a parachute jump record by leaping from 19,700 feet (6,000 meters); this record stood for four years. He retired to Switzerland in 1940, organising resistance work and marrying. In the late 1960s he returned to Belgium and lived his last five years with fellow Belgian ace Jan Olieslagers's only daughter until his death in 1986.

== Title, arms and honours ==
Coppens was created Knight Coppens de Houthulst by King Albert in 1930.

In 1960, he was created Baron Coppens de Houthulst by King Baudouin.

Coppens received the (in Belgium) honour to add 'de Houthulst' after his noble title (meaning: of Houthulst), referring to a wood he often overflew during the First World War.

His arms consist of 3 silver flying eagles on a blue background.

His motto was 'Je surmonterai' (I will overcome).

Willy Coppens deemed honors and awards to be very important, as he felt they ought to be a token of recognition. In his opinion, they should not be granted automatically and he felt it was unjust that lower ranking frontline servicemen received lower ranks in national orders than commanding generals that did not participate in active combat.

This feeling was made tangible in 1959 and 1968 when he refused the Commander's cross in the Order of Leopold as a civilian pilot who deserted the 'Compagnie des aviateurs' on 23 August 1914, after only 20 days of service received the Grand Officer's cross of the same order, a higher rank than the Commander's cross offered to him.

- Commander of the Order of the Crown with swords
- Commander of the Order of Leopold II with swords
- Officer of the order of Leopold
- War cross WW I with 27 palms and 13 bronze lions
- Yser cross
- Fire cross
- WWI Victory medal
- WW I commemorative medal
- Military cross, second class
- Commemorative medal of the 100th anniversary of national independence
- Grand officer of the Order of Ouissam Alaouite (Morocco)
- Order of Nichan-Iftikhar (Tunisia)
- Commander of the Legion of Honour (France)
- Commander of the Order of the Black Star (Benin)
- Commander of the Order of Isabella the Catholic (Spain)
- Officer of the Order of the White Eagle (Poland)
- Officer of the Order of Saints Maurice and Lazarus (Italy)
- Virtuti Military, Knight (Poland)
- Distinguished Service Order (United Kingdom)
- Military Cross (United Kingdom)
- Silver Medal for Military Valor (Italy)
- War cross WW I with 2 palms (France)
- War Cross with golden cross and palm (Portugal)
- War Merit Cross (Italy)
- War Cross WW I (Poland)
- 5 front bars
- 1 wound bar

== See also ==
- List of World War I aces from Belgium
