= Fernand Jacquet =

Fernand Maximillian Leon Jacquet
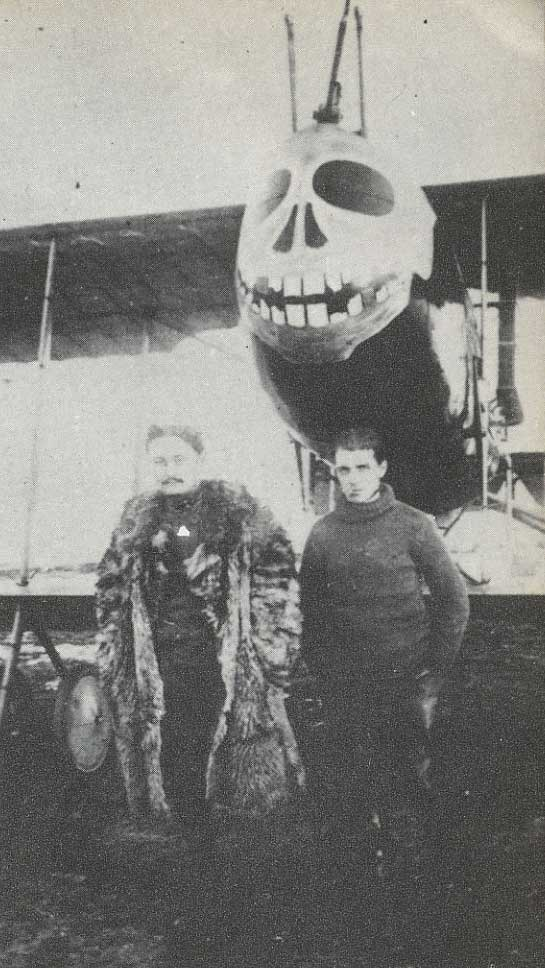
- Belgian Capt Fernand Jacquet and mechanic with Belgian Farman HF.20 pusher (with skull insignia) of the 2me Escadrille de Chasse, Day Reconnaissance.
- Born: 2 November 1888; Petite-Chapelle
- Died: 12 October 1947 (aged 58); Beaumont
- Military career
- Allegiance: Belgium
- Branch: Belgian Air Component
- Service years: 1907–1921
- Rank: Captain-Commandant
- Units: Escadrille Demanet (I), 2e Escadrille de Chasse, 1ère Escadrille de Chasse
- Commands: Groupe de Chasse
- Awards: Order of the Crown (Belgium), Order of Leopold (Belgium), Croix de Guerre, French Legion d'Honneur and Croix de Guerre, Russian Order of Saint Anna, British Distinguished Flying Cross
- Other work: Served in anti-Nazi resistance during World War II

Captain-Commandant Fernand Maximillian Leon Jacquet was a World War I flying ace credited with seven aerial victories. He was the first Belgian pilot to score an aerial victory, on 17 April 1915, and became the first Belgian ace on 1 February 1917. He was also the first Belgian pilot to fly the Belgian king Albert I to the front, in 1917. Additionally, he was the only Belgian honored by the British with a Distinguished Flying Cross.

== Background ==
Jacquet was the son of a wealthy landowner. He joined the Belgian Army as a cadet in October 1907, and was educated at the Royal Military Academy; he was commissioned on 25 June 1910 and then assigned to the 4ème Régt de Ligne. He qualified as a pilot on 25 February 1913 with Brevet No. 68, and at the outbreak of World War I was serving with the Escadrille Demanet (I) in Liege.

== Involvement in World War I ==
=== 1914 ===
When neutral Belgium was invaded by Germany in August 1914, Jacquet flew reconnaissance missions near Namur, and reported the hazards of the encroaching Germans. Nor was the action in the air enough for the aggressive Belgian pilot. When not flying combat missions in a two-seater, he would rove the roads near the front in an automobile with a mounted Lewis machine gun; his gunner was none other than Joseph-Phillippe-Francois de Riquet, Prince de Chimay. It seems probable that the Belgian had a gunner on the ground for the same reason he had one in the air; the gunners had to do the shooting because Jacquet was too nearsighted. Additionally, Jacquet would increasingly 'push the envelope' in his aerial missions, whether volunteering for "special missions", or simply hell-raising. In the latter category, Jacquet bombed the Germans at Groote Hemme on 24 November 1914, and again on Christmas Eve at Beerst and Essen. In the former, while brave men brought home the aerial photographs and reconnaissance sightings from the front, Jacquet penetrated past them to pierce deep into the German defenses, looking for a fight.

=== 1915 ===
He found ten Aviatiks on 26 February 1915, and took them on, though without success. On three other occasions, he attacked single Aviatiks. Finally, on 17 April 1915, he scored his nation's first aerial victory. Jacquet was taken under fire by the observer of a German Albatros two-seater at hundred yard range. He was flying a Farman HF.20 pusher with a Lewis gun, but it was his gunner, Henri Vindevoghel, who fired the fatal seven shots from 30 yards that killed the pilot, doomed his gunner, and set the plane on fire. Jacquet followed up with an indecisive combat on 20 June, when he claimed an enemy airplane driven down out of control, and on 28 July 1915, when he unsuccessfully claimed forcing an enemy plane to land.

=== 1916 ===
On 20 May 1916, Jacquet's gunner was Louis Robin. The Belgian duo fought meeting engagements with German floatplanes both morning and evening. In the evening battle, they took on half a formation of ten enemy planes, and sent one down for Jacquet's second confirmed win. There followed a string of unconfirmed claims, on 26 and 27 May and on 22 June. On 23 June, the Belgian Farman F.40 with the ghoulish insignia of a skull painted on the nose scored again, destroying a Fokker. Over the next month, the two Belgians rampaged, claiming two more wins that went unconfirmed, dropping flechettes on a German observation balloon, and strafing the Germans at Gistel. On the afternoon and evening of 30 July, Jacquet and Robin clashed with a series of Germans, being credited with an LVG destroyed. Their probable victim was Oberleutnant Franz Walz, who was downed with severe wounds that day.

Jacquet and Robin survived being shot down by anti-aircraft fire on 8 September 1916, they remaining uninjured even as their plane was demolished. They were probably flying a Belgian modification of the Farman. In December 1916, Jacquet was promoted to command of his squadron, 1ère Escadrille de Chasse.

=== 1917 ===
On 1 February 1917, Jacquet finally became an ace. He and Robin downed a brown Rumpler from 12,500 feet altitude.

On 7 April 1917, Jacquet was honored by being picked to personally fly his king, King Albert, on a tour of the front lines; the monarch and pilot were escorted by five Nieuports. When Belgium's first fighter wing, the Groupe de Chasse was organized later that month, King Albert was insistent that Jacquet take command.

Jacquet tried to acquire Bristol F.2 Fighters to replace his aged Farmans. He received SPAD XIs and Sopwith 1A2s instead. Meantime, Lieutenant Robin went off to pilot's training. Jacquet was promoted to Captain-Commandant in December.

=== 1918 ===
Jacquet fought an indecisive combat on 3 June 1918, driving his enemy down out of control, an action which would have counted as a victory if the Belgian were flying under Royal Air Force rules. On 4 October, and again on 6 November, he used a Spad to force down a German two-seater. Fernand Jacquest ended the war with seven confirmed aerial victories and nine unconfirmed ones. He also had been honored with numerous decorations, both from his home nation and from her allies. His native Belgium made him a Chevalier of the Order of Leopold and an Officer of the Order of the Crown with Palme, and awarded the Croix de Guerre with six citations, eight chevrons de front, Croix Civil 3rd Class, Medaille Victoire, and Medaille de Commemoration 1914–1918. The French made him a Chevalier de la Legion d'Honneur and awarded him their Croix de Guerre. The Russians awarded him their Order of Saint Anna. The British awarded him the Distinguished Flying Cross; he would be the only Belgian to receive one.

== Post World War I ==
Fernand Jacquet left the Belgian military in 1921. With his old companion Robin, he started a flying school near Charleroi, at Gosselies.

When the Germans once again invaded Belgium, at the start of World War II, Jacquet returned to his nation's service. He was an active member of the Belgian Resistance until his imprisonment in the Huy Fortress in 1942; where he was held until war's end.

Fernand Jacquet died in Beaumont, on 12 October 1947.

== List of aerial combats ==
See also Aerial victory standards of World War I

Claimed victories are listed below in chronological order. Confirmed victories are numbered. Unconfirmed victories are marked "u/c".

No.	Date/time	Aircraft	Foe	Result	Location	Notes
1	17 April 1915	Farman	Aviatik reconnaissance plane	Destroyed; burned	Beerst, Belgium	Belgium's first aerial victory
u/c	20 June 1915	Farman	Enemy airplane	Driven down out of control		
u/c	26 July 1915 @ 1820 hours	Farman	Aviatik reconnaissance plane	Forced to land	Westende, Belgium	
2	20 May 1916 @ 2030 hours	Farman	Seaplane	Destroyed	Nieuwpoort, Belgium	
u/c	26 May 1916 @ 1820 hours	Farman	Aviatik reconnaissance plane	Driven down out of control	Tourhout, Belgium	
u/c	27 May 1916 @ 1925 hours	Farman	Aviatik reconnaissance plane	Forced to land	Koekelare, Belgium	
u/c	22 June 1916 @ 0830	Farman	LVG reconnaissance plane	Destroyed	Staden, Belgium	
3	23 June 1916 @ 0800	Farman	Fokker	Destroyed	Koekelare	
u/c	30 June 1916 @ 1900 hours	Farman	Aviatik reconnaissance plane	Forced to land	Handzame, Belgium	
u/c	8 July 1916 @ 650 hours	Farman	LVG reconnaissance plane	Destroyed	Middelkerke, Belgium	
u/c	30 July 1916 @ 1200 hours	Farman	LVG reconnaissance plane	Destroyed	Houthulst Forest	
4	30 July 1916 @ 1630 hours	Farman	LVG reconnaissance plane	Destroyed	Houthulst, Belgium	Franz Walz wounded
5	1 February 1917	Sopwith 1 1/2 Strutter	Rumpler reconnaissance plane	Destroyed	Lombardsijde, Belgium	Jacquet became Belgium's first ace
u/c	5 June 1918 @ 0642 hours	SPAD S.XI	Fokker Triplane fighter	Driven down out of control	Houthulst	
6	4 October 1918 @ 0800 hours	SPAD S.XI	Rumpler reconnaissance plane	Forced to land	Gits	
7	6 November 1918 @ 0900 hours	SPAD S.XI	Two-seater	Forced to land	Ghent	

List compiled from Above the War Fronts and www.theaerodrome.com
