= Hanriot HD.1 =

French WW1 fighter aircraft

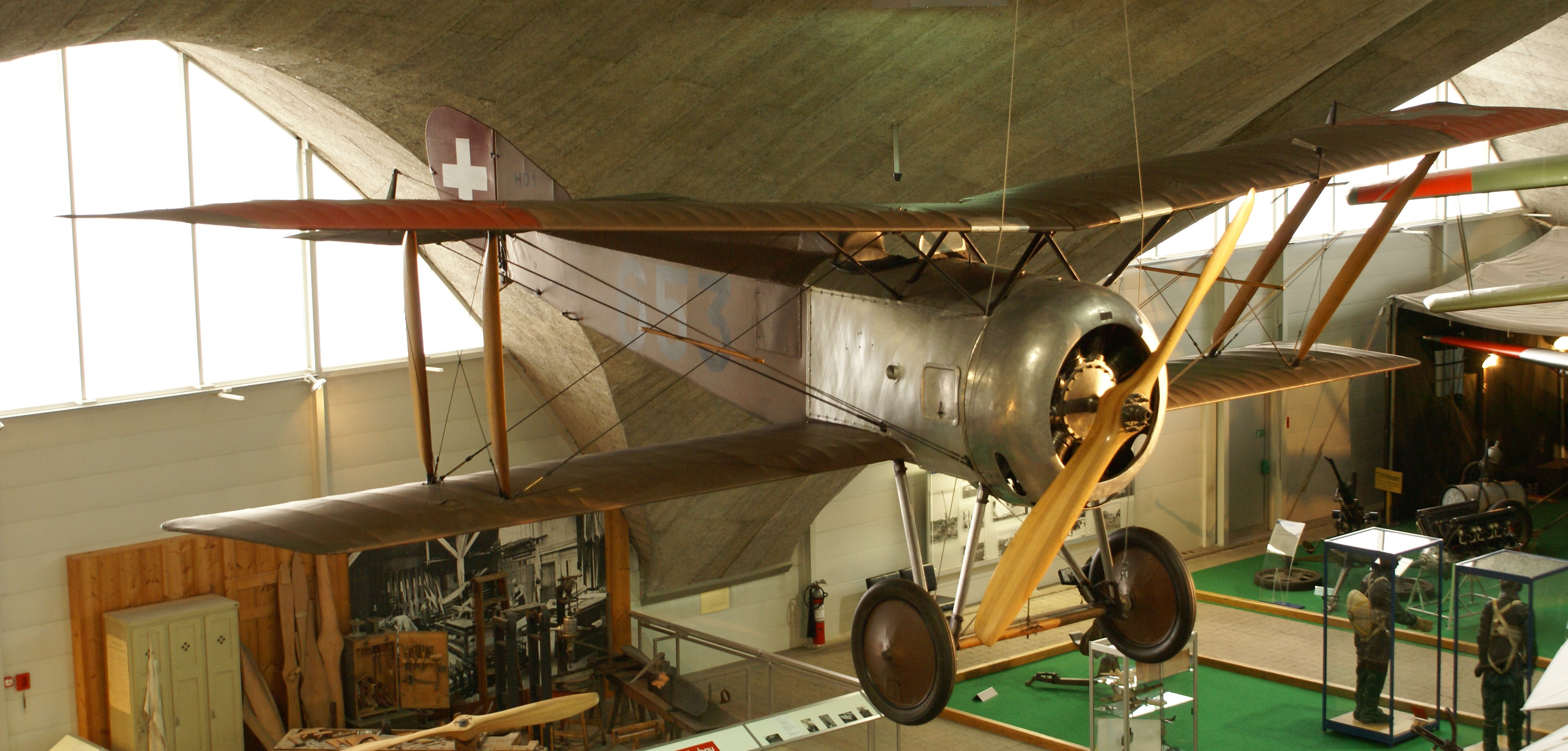
- Swiss HD.1 in a museum

General information
- Type: Biplane fighter aircraft
- Manufacturer: Hanriot
- Designer: Pierre Dupont
- Primary users: Corpo Aeronautico Militare Aviation Militaire Belge
- Number built: about 1,200

History
- Introduction date: June 1916
- Variants: Hanriot HD.2

The Hanriot HD.1 is a French World War I single-seat fighter aircraft. Rejected for service with French squadrons in favour of the SPAD S.VII, the type was supplied to the Aviation Militaire Belge (Belgian Military Aviation) and the Corpo Aeronautico Militare (Military Aviation Corps) of the Royal Italian Army, with both of which it proved highly successful. Of a total of about 1,200 examples built, 831 were produced by Italian companies under licence.

== Development and production ==
The Hanriot company produced a series of pioneering monoplanes pre-war but had settled down as a licence manufacturer, notably of Sopwith 1½ strutters, when the HD.1 was produced in 1916. The type was a conventional fighter with the general characteristics of a typical Sopwith aircraft, being strongly but lightly built and combining clean lines with a light wing loading. It used the same "1½" (or "W") cabane strut arrangement as the Sopwith two-seater. It had a flat lower wing, though the top wing had quite sharp dihedral.

On the power of its 110 hp (82 kW) Le Rhone rotary engine it was not outstandingly fast but it was very manoeuvrable and proved popular with pilots as a safe and pleasant aircraft to fly. To maintain a competitive climbing and altitude performance it was usual practice to restrict armament to one synchronised Vickers machine gun, although there was provision for a second gun and one was occasionally fitted. In French-built aircraft the gun (or guns) were fitted to the sides of the cockpit and were accessible to the pilot without their butts being in front of his face in the event of a crash – an unusual but welcome feature, even if its origins lay in the form of the cabane struts. Italian-built versions mounted one machine gun centrally. The type was also produced by the Nieuport-Macchi company of Varese, Italy, which built almost 900 HD.1s between 1917 and 1919; more than the parent firm.

== Operational history ==
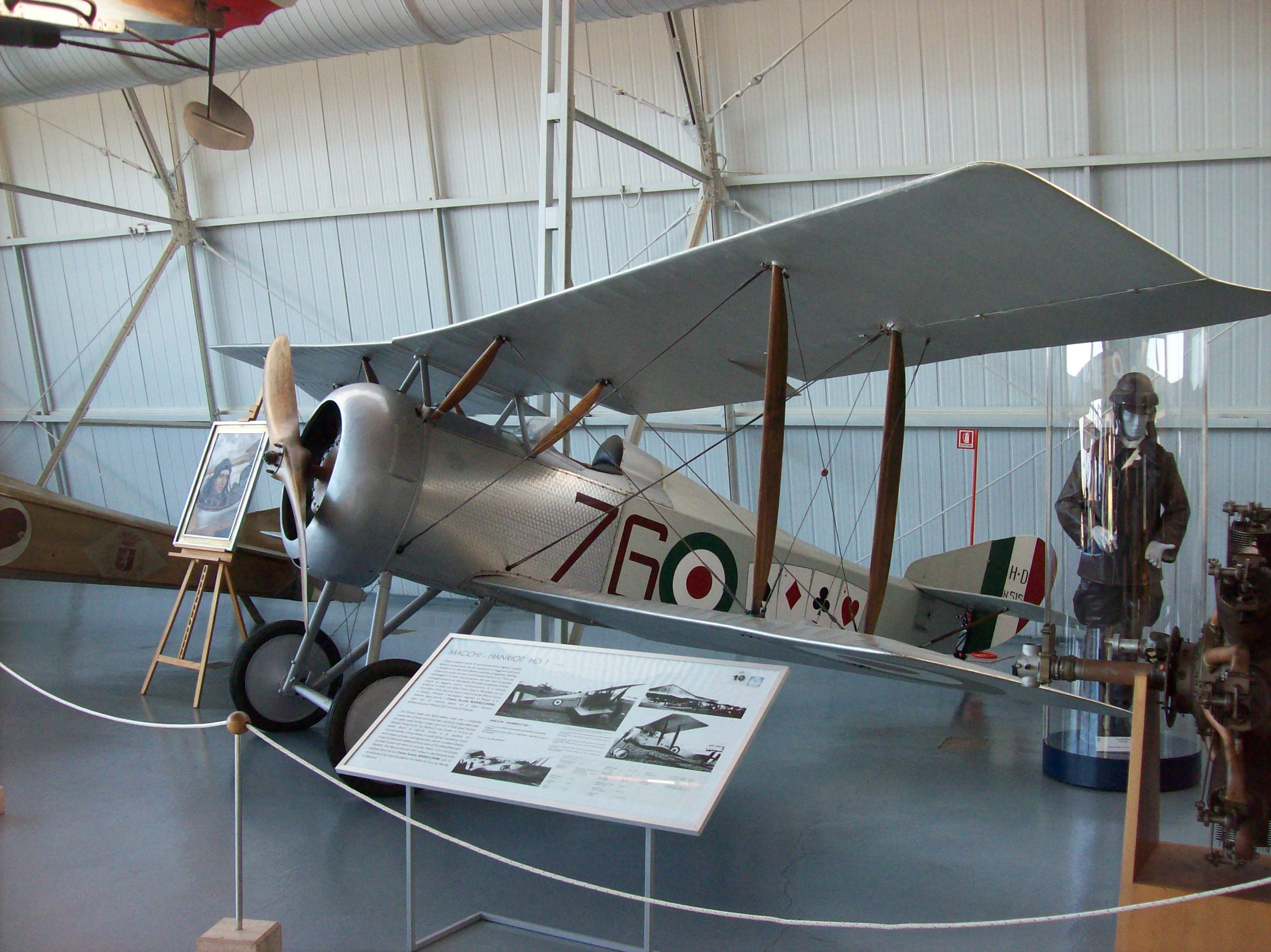
Macchi-built HD.1 flown by ace Flavio Baracchini

The new type was ordered into production as a possible replacement for the Nieuport 17 but became "superfluous" when it was decided to replace the Nieuport with the SPAD S.7 in the French air service. Some were supplied to the French Navy, a few of which were eventually passed to the U.S. Navy – some naval Hanriots were converted to or built as floatplanes with enlarged tail surfaces.

The bulk of early production was supplied to the Belgians, who notoriously had to make do with Allied cast-offs. With the Belgian fighter squadrons the HD.1 proved surprisingly successful and the type remained the standard Belgian fighter for the rest of the war. Willy Coppens, the top Belgian ace of the war, was the most successful HD.1 pilot. At least one of his machines was experimentally fitted with an 0.43 in (11 mm) Vickers machine-gun for use in balloon busting, something at which Coppens excelled. Most of his victories were balloons and many were claimed while flying HD.1s. These aircraft remained in use until the late 1920s.

The type was also supplied in small numbers to the Italians, who manufactured it in quantity and used it to replace Nieuports and SPADs. The type was considered (by the Italians) to be a better all-round fighter than even the SPAD S.XIII and it became the standard Italian fighter, equipping 16 of the 18 operational Italian fighter squadrons by November 1918. Surplus Italian-built Hanriots were used by several countries postwar, including the Swiss.

The U.S. Naval Aircraft Factory built (or possibly modified/converted) 10 HD.1s in the immediate postwar years. These were mainly used as trainers, although they were also involved in experiments with take-off platforms on warships – they could be fitted with twin guns and at least one machine had a hydrovane and flotation bags of the type developed for the Royal Navy.

== Surviving aircraft ==
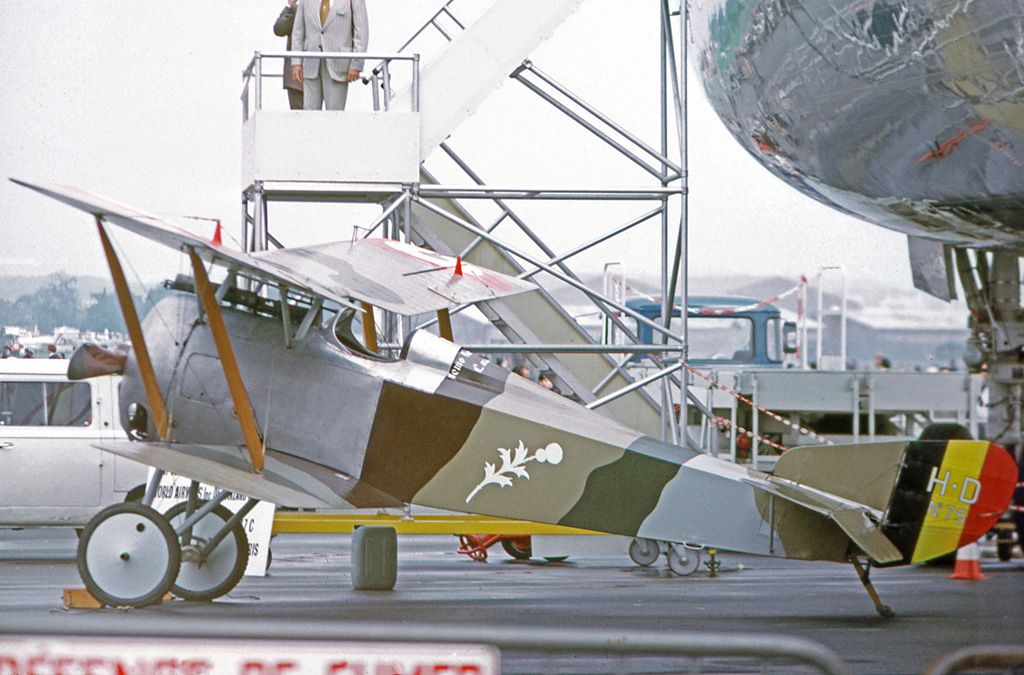
Hanriot HD.1 No. 75 in Belgian Air Force markings. This aircraft is owned by The Vintage Aviator Limited, Hood Aerodrome, Masterton, New Zealand

Five examples of the HD.1 are preserved in museums in Europe and the US:

Belgium

- CN 78 Royal Museum of the Armed Forces and Military History, Brussels

Italy

- CN 515 Museo Storico Dell'Aeronautica Miltare Italiana, Vigna di Valle, near Rome

Switzerland

- Flieger-Flab-Museum, Dübendorf near Zurich

New Zealand

- CN 75, The Vintage Aviator Limited, Hood Aerodrome, Masterton, New Zealand, a former Belgian aircraft, saved by Richard Shuttleworth before World War II, and formerly held by the Royal Air Force Museum This example was restored to airworthy status after being acquired by TVAL and is occasionally flown from Hood Aerodrome, Masterton in Wairarapa, New Zealand.

United States

- CN 5934 Planes of Fame Air Museum in Chino, California. This airplane was flown by famed World War I French Ace Charles Nungesser in the 1925 movie The Sky Raider. May have been an HD.2C in the US Navy.

== Operators ==
Belgium

- Aviation Militaire Belge
  - 1ère Escadrille de Chasse
- Groupe de Chasse
  - 9ème Escadrille de Chasse
  - 10ème Escadrille de Chasse
  - 11ème Escadrille de Chasse

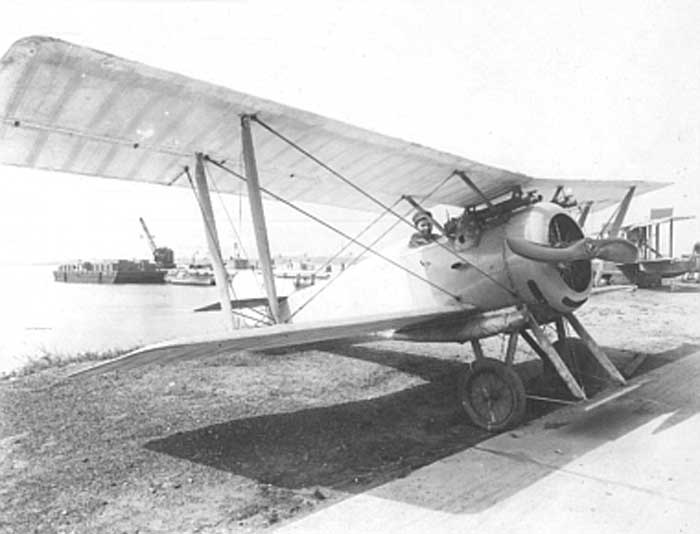
Post-war U.S. Navy machine with hydrovanes and flotation bags

France

- French Navy

Ecuador

- Ecuadorian Air Force - One aircraft only.

Kingdom of Italy

- Corpo Aeronautico Militare - Standard Italian fighter at the end of World War I

Paraguay

- Paraguayan Air Force - Three aircraft only.

Switzerland

- Swiss Air Force - Postwar

United States

- United States Navy

== Specifications (HD.1) ==
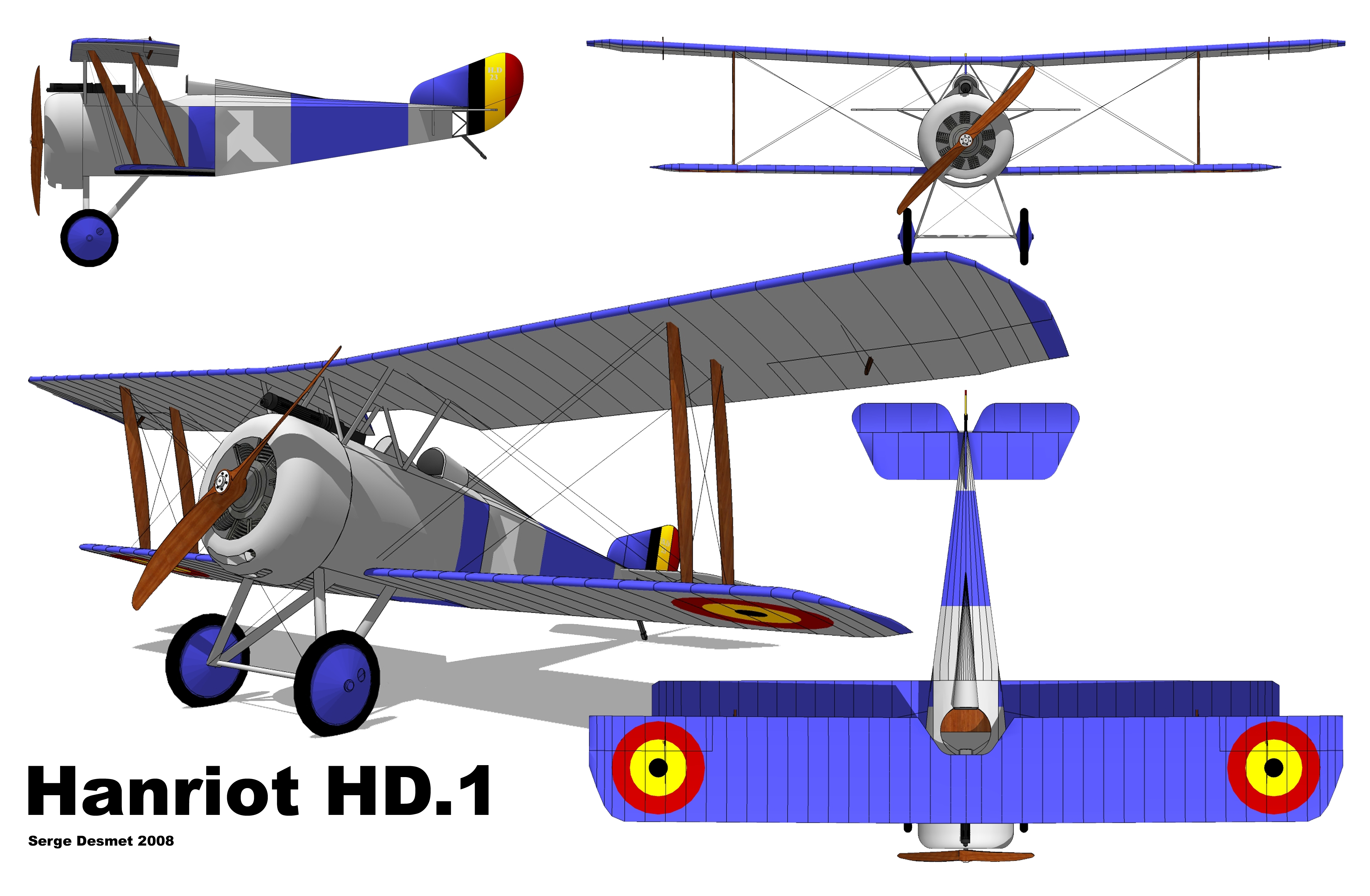

Data from Jane's Vintage Aircraft Recognition Guide

General characteristics

- Crew: 1
- Length: 5.85 m (19 ft 2 in)
- Wingspan: 8.7 m (28 ft 7 in)
- Height: 2.94 m (9 ft 8 in)
- Wing area: 18 m^{2} (190 sq ft)
- Empty weight: 407 kg (897 lb)
- Gross weight: 605 kg (1,334 lb)
- Max takeoff weight: 652 kg (1,437 lb)
- Powerplant: 1 × Le Rhône 9J 9-cylinder air-cooled rotary piston engine, 81 kW (109 hp)
- Propellers: 2-bladed fixed-pitch wooden propeller

Performance

- Maximum speed: 184 km/h (114 mph, 99 kn)
- Range: 550 km (340 mi, 300 nmi)
- Service ceiling: 6,400 m (21,000 ft)
- Time to altitude: 2,000 m (6,600 ft) in 5 minutes 6 seconds

3,000 m (9,800 ft) in 11 minutes

Armament

- Guns: 1 × 7.7 mm (0.303 in) Vickers machine guns. An 11 mm (0.433 in) Vickers gun on one or two Belgian machines.

== See also ==
Related lists

- List of military aircraft of France
- List of fighter aircraft
- List of non-carrier aircraft flown from aircraft carriers

== Bibliography ==
- Bruce, J. M. (1966). The Hanriot HD 1. Profile Publications. Leatherhead: Profile Publications. OCLC 22783472.
- Cony, Christophe (December 1998). "Les chasseurs Hanriot HD.1 belgique" [The Belgian Hanriot HD.1 Fighters]. Avions: Toute l'aéronautique et son histoire (in French) (69): 52–60. ISSN 1243-8650.
- Cony, Christophe (February 1999). "Les chasseurs Hanriot HD.1 suisses" [The Swiss Hanriot HD.1 Fighters]. Avions: Toute l'aéronautique et son histoire (in French) (71): 4–8. ISSN 1243-8650.
- Hirschauer, Louis; Dollfus, Charles, eds. (1921). L'Année Aéronautique: 1920–1921 (in French). Paris: Dunod. p. 7. OCLC 944632480.
- Lamberton, W. M. (1960). Cheesman, E. F. (ed.). Fighter Aircraft of the 1914–1918 War. Letchworth: Harleyford Publications. OCLC 1395838.
