= Moerkerke =

- Deelgemeente
- Coordinates: 51°14′44″N 3°20′21″E
- Country: Belgium
- Province: West Flanders
- Municipality: Damme

Area
  - Total: 22.89 km^{2} (8.84 sq mi)

Population (2004)
  - Total: 2,959
- Source: NIS
- Postal code: 8340

Moerkerke is a town in the Belgian province West Flanders and a part (deelgemeente) of the city of Damme

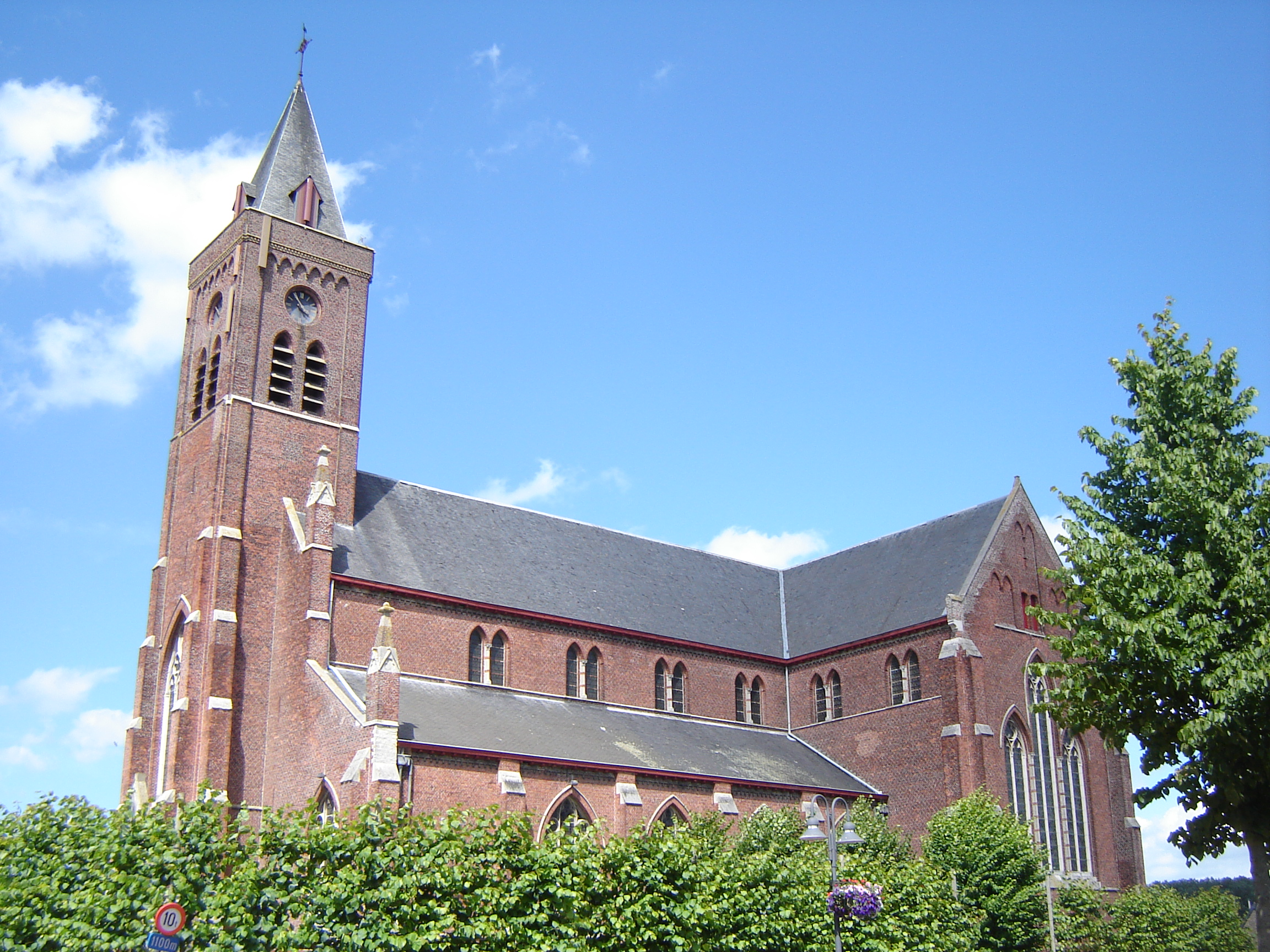
Sint-Dionysiuskerk (church of Saint Dionysius)
