= 8e Escadre de Chasse =

8^{e} Escadre de Chasse 8th Fighter Wing
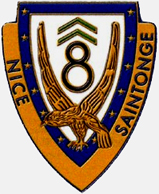
- Insignia of the Escadre
- Active: 25 August 2015 - present
- Country: France
- Branch: French Air and Space Force
- Type: Fighter aircraft unit
- Role: Aerial Instruction/Training/Aerial Drills
- Part of: Fighter Brigade
- Equipment: Dassault/Dornier Alpha Jet

The 8^{e} Escadre de Chasse 8^{e} EC or 8th Fighter Wing is a fighter formation of the Fighter Brigade of the French Air and Space Force, which was reformed on 25 August 2015 at Cazaux Air Base.

The unit has known previously various periods of activity:

- On Aerial Base 108 Marignane, between 1 January 1936 and 1 May 1939;
- In Indochina, between 16 January 1951 and 27 July 1954;
- In Morocco, on Aerial Base 151 Rabat-Salé, between 1 August 1955 and November 1960
- In Algeria on the base of Oran La Senia between November 1960 and July 1961
- At Nancy Ochey between July 1961 and 1 December 1961
- At Cazaux, between 1 February 1964 and 1 July 1993.

== Composition ==
- Escadron de Transition Opérationnelle 1/8 Saintonge
- Escadron de Transition Opérationnelle 2/8 Nice
- Escadron d'Entraînement 3/8 Côte d'Or
- Escadron de Soutien Technique Aéronautique 15/8 Pilat

== Escadrons/Squadrons history ==
The 8^{e} Escadre possesses two historical squadrons, the "Saintonge" and "Nice". The squadron "Languedoc" was attached to the Escadre during ten years.

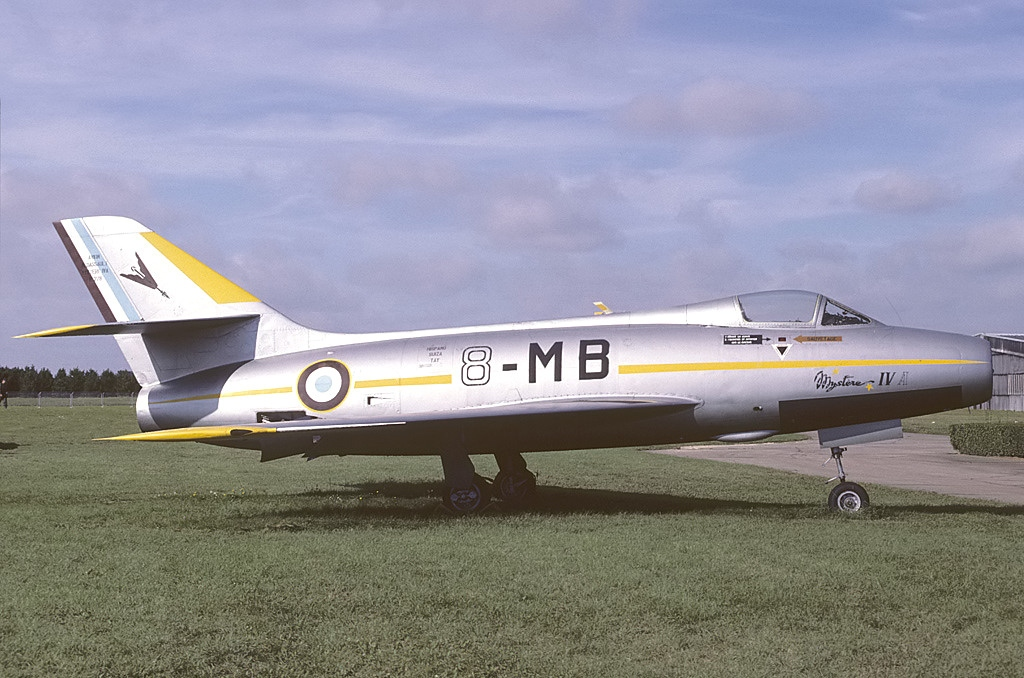
Mystère IVA with colors of the Saintonge.

=== Before WWII ===
- Hunter Group - Groupe de Chasse I/8 : from 1 January 1936 until 1 May 1939
- Groupe de Chasse II/8 : from 1 January 1936 and 1 May 1939

=== Escadron/Squadron "Saintonge" ===
- Groupe Mixte I/8 Saintonge : from 16 January 1951 until 27 July 1954
- Hunter Squadron Escadron de Chasse 1/8 Saintonge : from 9 September 1960 until 1 December 1961, and from 1 February 1964 until 31 July 1993

=== Escadron/Squadron "Languedoc" ===
- Groupe de Chasse II/8 Languedoc : from 1 August 1951 until 27 July 1954
- Escadron de chasse 2/8 Languedoc : from 1 August 1955 until 1 December 1961

=== Escadron/Squadron "Maghreb" ===
- Escadron de Chasse 1/8 Maghreb : from 1 August 1955 until September 1960

=== Escadron/Squadron "Nice" ===
- Escadron de Chasse 2/8 Nice : from 1 February 1964 until 31 July 1993

== Bases ==
- Aerial Base 108 Marigane: from 1 January 1936 until 1 May 1939
- Indochina : from 16 January 1951 until 27 July 1954
- Aerial Base 151 Rabat-Salé: from 1 August 1955 until the beginning of 1960
- Aerial Base Nancy-Ochey : from the beginning of 1960 until 1 December 1961
- Aerial Base 120 Cazaux : from 1 February 1964 until 31 July 1993, and as of 25 August 2015

== Equipment ==
- Morane-Saulnier MS.225 : from 1 January 1936 until 1 January 1939
- Dewoitine D.500 : from 1 January 1936 until 1 January 1939
- Dewoitine D.510 : from 1 January 1939 until 1 May 1939
- Republic P-47D Thunderbolt : from 16 January 1951 until 27 July 1954
- Grumman F8F-1B Bearcat : from 16 January 1951 until 27 July 1954
- Mistral : from 1 August 1955 until 1959
- Dassault Mystère IVA : from June 1959 until 1 December 1961, and from 1 February 1964 until 1982
- Alpha Jet: from October 1982 until 31 July 1993, and as of 25 August 2015

== See also ==
- Major (France)
- Patrouille de France
- Chief of Staff of the French Air Force
- List of Escadres of the French Air Force
