= Virginie Guyot =

French fighter pilot (born 1976)

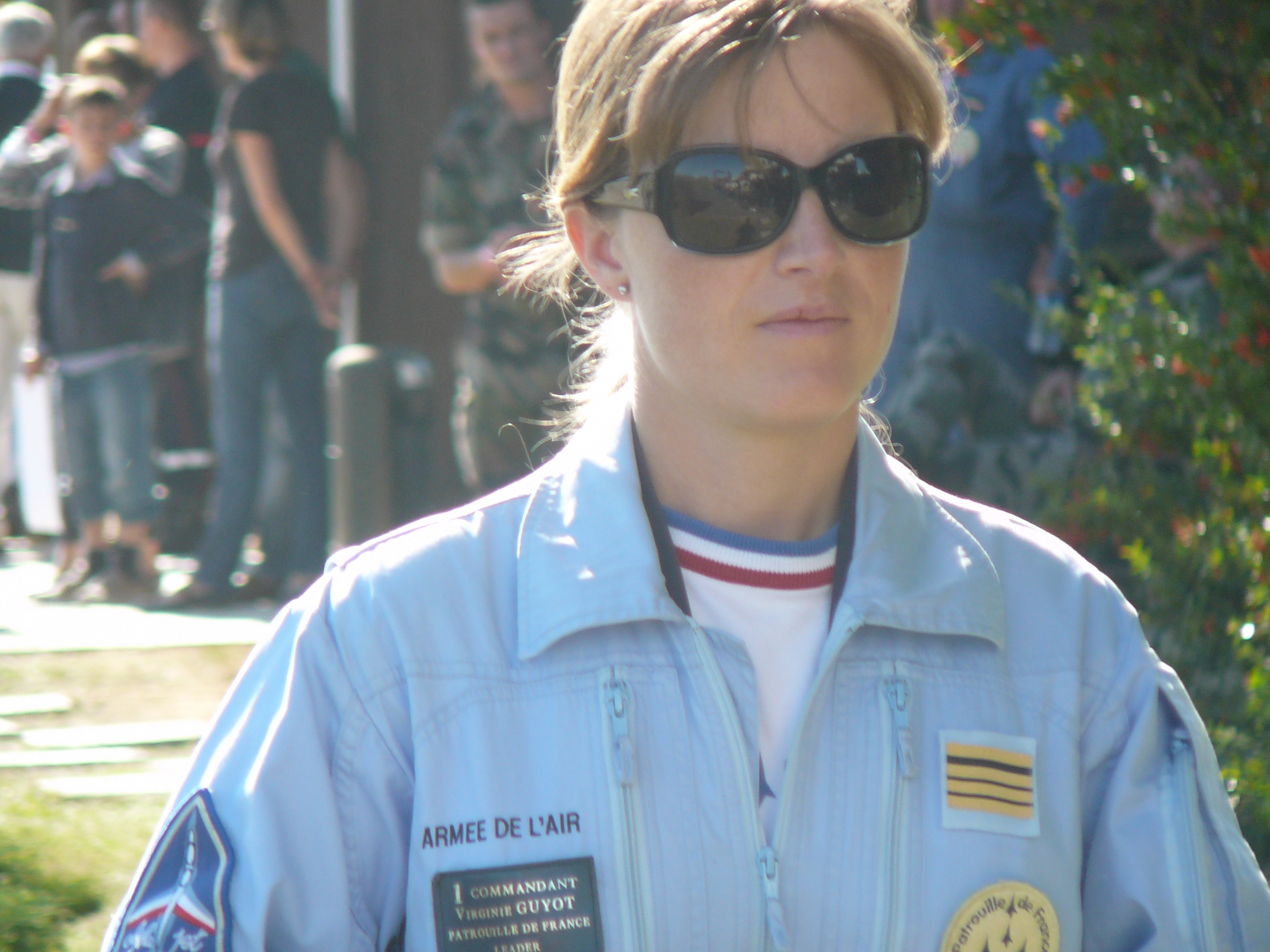
Virginie Guyot

Commandant Virginie Guyot (French: [viʁʒini ɡɥijo]; born 30 December 1976 in Angers) is a fighter pilot of the Armée de l'Air who achieved an historical first when she was appointed leader of the Patrouille de France, becoming the first woman in the world to command a precision aerobatic demonstration team.

Hateur Physique: 1,58

== Career ==
After following high school and scientific classes prépa in the Prytanée Militaire, an advanced military secondary institution, Virginie Guyot entered the Ecole de l'Air, the French Air Force officers' school, in 1997. After her degree, she joined the fighter pilot training Air Force base in Tours.

She received her fighter pilot wings in 2002, just three years after Caroline Aigle, the first woman to reach that position in the history of the Armée de l'Air. She was assigned to the Mirage F1-CR in the Escadron de reconnaissance 2/33 Savoie.

She was engaged in operations in Chad, Tajikistan and Afghanistan. Chef d'escadron (squadron leader) since 2007, she was promoted to the rank of Commandant (Major) in 2009.

At the same time, she was the first woman to join the Patrouille de France, one of the world's oldest and most skilled demonstration teams, in which she was directly appointed as Charognard (deputy leader). On 25 November 2009, she became the first, and so far only, woman to lead a prestigious aerobatic team.

Following her service in the Patrouille de France (no one can serve as leader for more than a year), she plans to join the Etat-major (Air Force Staff).
