= Cazaux Air Base =

Cazaux Air Base Base aérienne 120
- IATA: none; ICAO: LFBC

Summary
- Airport type: Military
- Owner: Government of France
- Operator: Armée de l'air et de l'espace
- Location: Cazaux (La Teste-de-Buch), Nouvelle-Aquitaine, France
- Elevation AMSL: 85 ft (26 m)
- Coordinates: 44°31′56″N 001°07′43″W

Map
- Location of Cazaux Air Base in Nouvelle-Aquitaine

Runways
Direction	Length		Surface
Direction	ft	m	Surface
06/24	7,900	2,408
- Source:Our Airports

Cazaux Air Base (French: Base aérienne 120 Cazaux) (ICAO: LFBC) is a French Air and Space Force (French: Armée de l'air et de l'espace) base. The base is located in the village of Cazaux, part of the town of La Teste-de-Buch, and is approximately 35 miles (56 km) southwest of Bordeaux.

== Overview ==
The air base was created in 1914 at the behest of Commandant Marzac. The site did not take the name of BA 120 until 1962, becoming the largest air base in France one hundred years after it was founded. The base is used mainly for training and integration of French fighter pilots and gunnery training over the Bay of Biscay.

The Franco-Belgian Dassault/Dornier Alpha Jet aerial fighter school is based at Cazaux. It is responsible for training future fighter pilots of the two nations.

Since 1998, the base has hosted the No. 150 Squadron of the Republic of Singapore Air Force, equipped with ST Aerospace A-4SU Super Skyhawks, and since 15 November 2012, with Alenia Aermacchi M-346 Masters to train pilots before assigning Singaporeans to operational F-16C/D Fighting Falcons and F-15SG Strike Eagle units. As of March 2010, 120 pilots had been trained at the base.

Approximately 2,600 military and civilian personnel work on the base.

== Units assigned ==
- Escadron de Transition Opérationnelle 1/8 Saintonge with the Dassault/Dornier Alpha Jet Based in Cazaux since 1964.
- Escadron de Transition Opérationnelle 2/8 Nice with the Dassault/Dornier Alpha Jet Based in Cazaux since 1964.
- Escadron d'Entraînement 3/8 Côte d'Or with the Dassault/Dornier Alpha Jet
- Escadron d'Hélicoptères 1/67 Pyrénées with the Eurocopter EC725 Caracal Based in Cazaux since 1972.
- The Centre of Expertise in Embedded Arm (00 331 SEAC) which since 1 September 2009 replaces Experimentation Center and Shooting Instruction in Air (Ceita), which forms each year 200-250 French and foreign trainees
- Group Instruction Flight Safety (GISV) of the National Gendarmerie from 1 September 2010.
- A DGA test site in Flight (Formerly CEV Cazaux).
- Technicians Training Center Safety of Air Force (CFTSAA) 00/308
- No. 150 Squadron of the Republic of Singapore Air Force.

== History ==
The airfield was created in 1914 during World War I in order to train French and Allied military pilots (fighters and bombers) and still exists as Base Aérienne 120 "Commandant Marzac".

Most of the American volunteer pilots of the Lafayette Escadrille came to the Cazaux camp to achieve their training as war pilots.

When the U.S. entered the war, the American Expeditionary Forces had several units based here, including the 36th Aero Squadron, two balloon companies (36th and 45th) and artillery observers.

A former French, then Russian, camp located 5 kilometres (3.1 mi) from the airfield was Camp Hunt, where infantry and artillery troops were trained before joining the Front. Near Camp Hunt, a cemetery was established for American casualties; some of the pilots killed when serving at Cazaux were buried in this cemetery.

=== American presence ===
American Air Service pilot training was reinforced by the finishing course in aerial gunnery which permitted the American Air Service to give, under French supervision and direction, at the French aerial gunnery school at Cazaux. This work, which commenced in December 1917, in a large measure neutralized the delay in getting an American aerial gunnery school into operation, and overcame the early difficulties caused by American lack of machine guns and ammunition. This meant that after graduation pilots were given a full course in aerial gunnery, either at Cazaux or the American school at St. Jean-de-Monts.

=== Luftwaffe use ===
After the French defeat in World War II Cazaux was used by Luftwaffe units from the summer of 1940 onwards. Several training and fighter units used the base, including the 1st group of the Night Fighter Wing NJG.2 and the 2nd and 3rd Fighter Squadrons of Fighter Group JG26. Of the Destroyer Squadron 1. Between spring 1943 and summer 1944, it was a target of Allied air raids.

=== French Air Force ===
After German withdrawal the French Air Force repaired the base, naming it Airfield R.51, and Cazaux was the home of the French bomber group GB 1/31 "Aunis" equipped with Junkers Ju 88 combat aircraft in the spring of 1945.

In 1962/1963 the Bomber group 2/91 "Guyenne", previously deployed in the Algerian War, was stationed briefly. This group was replaced in 1964 by No 293, Escadron de Chasse 2/8 "Nice" equipped with Dassault Mystère IV fighter-bomber aircraft which merged with the local gunnery center and henceforth operated two flying groups. From 1982 on, units based in Cazaux were equipped with Alpha Jets as the Ecole de Transition Opérationnelle (E.T.O.) since 1995. Currently, there are two training squadrons in Cazaux, 1/8 and 2/8. In June 2004 the Belgian 11 Squadron, equipped with Alpha jets, was relocated to Cazaux, forming the French-Belgian Alpha Jet School (AJetS).

Also based at Cazaux is 1/67th Pyrenees Squadron, a combat search and rescue helicopter unit equipped with EC-725 Caracal. This is a joint unit, so its pilots come from different armed services, but is assigned namely to the French Air Force.

=== Singapore Air Force presence ===
Cazaux Air Base is home to 150 Squadron RSAF and its personnel. The RSAF has conducted flying training in France since 1998, and both air forces also interact regularly through various professional exchanges and courses. 150 Squadron currently operates M-346 aircraft that replaced the A-4SU in fighter pilot training. The Landes forest, the target centre of Captieux and the aerial zones of Golfe de Gascogne offer all the necessary space for RSAF pilot training requirements which the RSAF cannot find in the limited size of Singapore.

== Bibliography ==
- Mombeek, Eric (May 2001). "Les trésors de Cazaux" [The Treasures of Cazaux]. Avions: Toute l'Aéronautique et son histoire (in French) (98): 44–47. ISSN 1243-8650.
