= Escadron de Transition Opérationnelle 2/8 Nice =

Operational Transition Squadron 2/8 Nice
- Escadron de Transition Opérationnelle 2/8 Nice
- Country: France
- Branch: Armée de l'air et de l'espace
- Type: Trainer aircraft
- Role: Operational Transition Squadron
- Garrison/HQ: Cazaux Air Base

Aircraft flown
- Trainer: Dassault/Dornier Alpha Jet

Escadron de Transition Opérationnelle 2/8 Nice is a French Air and Space Force (Armée de l'air et de l'espace) Operational Transition Squadron located at Cazaux Air Base, Gironde, France which operates the Dassault/Dornier Alpha Jet.

This Sqn's heritage can be traced back to No. 326 Squadron RAF.

== See also ==
- List of French Air and Space Force aircraft squadrons
