= Escadron de Transition Opérationnelle 1/8 Saintonge =

Operational Transition Squadron 1/8 Saintonge
- Escadron de Transition Opérationnelle 01.008 Saintonge
- Active: September 1, 2009 - August 26, 2020 (as ETO 1/8 Saintonge)
- Country: France
- Branch: Armée de l'air et de l'espace
- Type: Trainer aircraft
- Role: Operational Transition Squadron
- Garrison/HQ: Cazaux Air Base
- Nickname: ETO 1/8 Saintonge

Aircraft flown
- Trainer: Dassault/Dornier Alpha Jet

Escadron de Transition Opérationnelle 1/8 Saintonge was a French Air and Space Force (Armée de l'air et de l'espace) Operational Transition Squadron located at Cazaux Air Base, Gironde, France which operated the Dassault/Dornier Alpha Jet. It was disbanded in August 2020, letting the Escadron de Chasse 2/8 Nice (later disbanded in July 2022) and the Escadron d'Entraînement (also called Escadron de Chasse) 3/8 Côte d'Or, the two last squadron left in the 8e Escadre de Chasse.

== Denominations ==
- Groupe de Chasse (GC) I/8 (1936-1942)
- 1er Groupe de Chasse FFI (May 1, 1944 - May 24, 1944)
- Groupe Doret (May 1944 - December 1944)
- Groupe de Chasse II/18 Saintonge (1944-1946)
- Groupe de Marche (GM) I/8 Saintonge (1951-1953)
- Groupe de Chasse I/22 Saintonge (1953-1954)
- Escadron de Chasse (EC) 1/8 Maghreb (1954-1960)
- Escadron de Chasse 1/8 Saintonge (1960-1961)
- Escadron de Chasse 1/7 Saintonge (1961-1964)
- Escadron de Chasse 1/8 Saintonge (1964-1993)
- Escadron de Transition Opérationnelle (ETO) n°1 Saintonge (1993-2009)
- Escadron de Transition Opérationnelle 1/8 Saintonge (2009-2020)

== Escadrilles ==
- 1st Escadrille : 3C2 : from 1936 to 2020
- 2nd Escadrille : 4C1 : from 1936 to 2020

== Aircraft used ==
- Dewoitine D.500 (1936-1939)
- Morane-Saulnier MS.225 (1936-1939)
- Dewoitine D.510 (1938-1939)
- Bloch MB.152 (1939-1942)
- Dewoitine D.520 (1944-1945)
- Morane-Saulnier MS.500 (1944)
- Supermarine Spitfire (1945-1946)
- Republic P-47 Thunderbolt (1951-1953)
- Grumman F8F Bearcat (1951-1954)
- SNCASE SE.535 Mistral (1955-1959)
- Dassault Mystère IV (1959-1982)
- Dassault/ Dornier Alpha Jet (1982-2020)

== See also ==
- List of French Air and Space Force aircraft squadrons
