= Dassault/Dornier Alpha Jet =

French light attack fighter

Alpha Jet
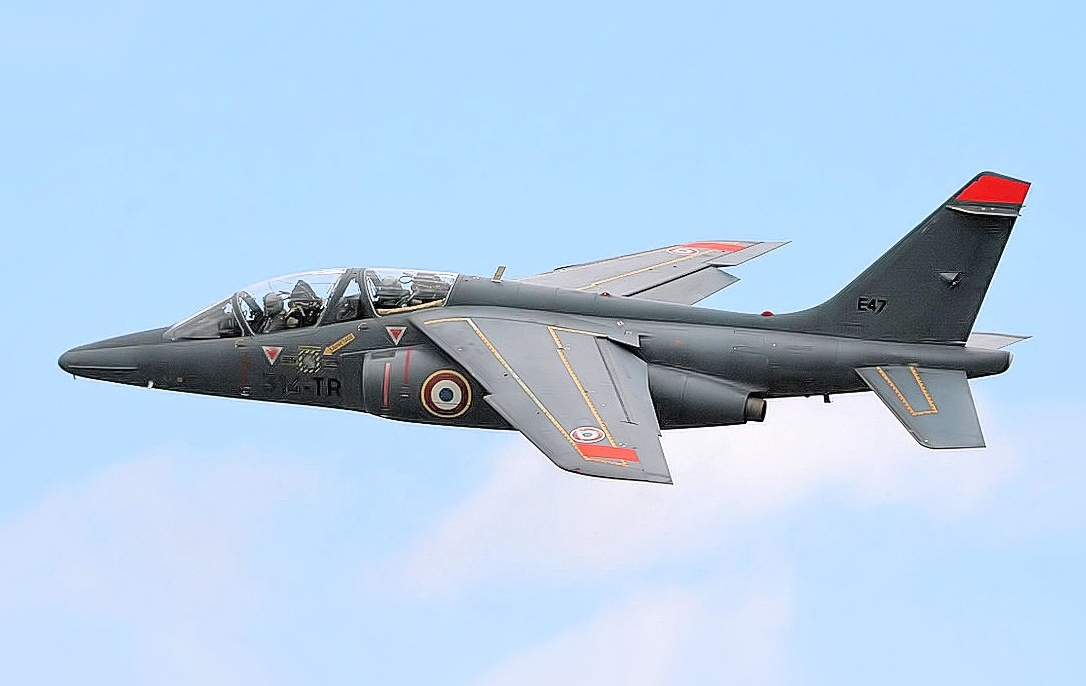
- An Alpha Jet of the French Air Force

General information
- Type: Light attack and advanced trainer aircraft
- National origin: France / West Germany
- Manufacturer: Dassault Aviation/Dornier Flugzeugwerke
- Status: In service
- Primary users: French Air and Space Force Top Aces; Egyptian Air Force; Royal Thai Air Force; Royal Moroccan Air Force
- Number built: 480

History
- Manufactured: 1973–1991
- Introduction date: 4 November 1977
- First flight: 26 October 1973

The Dassault/Dornier Alpha Jet is a light attack jet and advanced jet trainer co-manufactured by Dassault Aviation of France and Dornier Flugzeugwerke of Germany. It was developed specifically to perform trainer and light attack missions, as well as to perform these duties better than the first generation of jet trainers that preceded it. Following a competition, a design submitted by a team comprising Breguet Aviation, Dassault Aviation, and Dornier Flugzeugwerke, initially designated as the TA501, was selected and subsequently produced as the Alpha Jet.

Both the French Air and Space Force and West German Air Force procured the Alpha Jet in large numbers, the former principally as a trainer aircraft and the latter choosing to use it as a light attack platform. As a result of post-Cold War military cutbacks, Germany elected to retire its own fleet of Alpha Jets in the 1990s and has re-sold many of these aircraft to both military and civilian operators. The Alpha Jet has been adopted by a number of air forces across the world and has also seen active combat use by some of these operators.

== Development ==
=== Origins ===
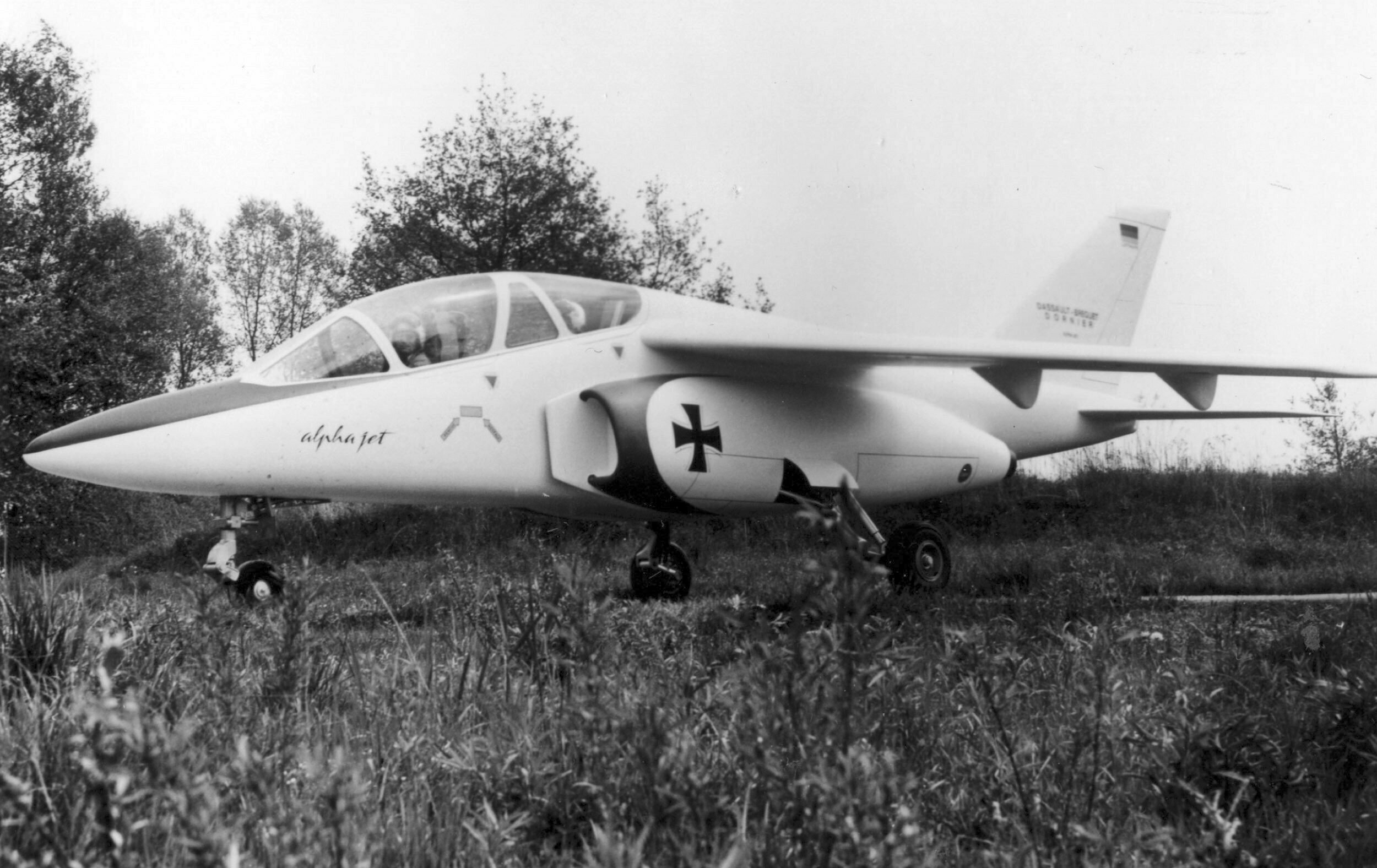
An early Alpha Jet presented in a company marketing photo.

In the early 1960s, European air forces began to consider their requirements for the coming decades. One such area of consideration was the requirement for a new generation of jet-powered trainer aircraft to replace such aircraft as the US-built Lockheed T-33 Shooting Star and French-built Fouga Magister. Britain and France established a collaborative program to pursue development of what was initially intended to become a supersonic jet aircraft. This aircraft was to be produced in two distinct variants for different roles: trainer and light attack aircraft. The result of this collaboration, the SEPECAT Jaguar, proved to be an excellent aircraft, but its definition had changed in the interim, and the type emerged as a full-sized, nuclear-capable strike fighter, whose two-seat variants were used for operational conversion to the type. As such, the Jaguar was not well suited for the general training mission.

This left the original requirement unfulfilled. As a result of this outcome, in 1967, France entered into a series of discussions with West Germany on the topic of a prospective collaboration effort to meet this demand. West Germany was keen to participate in such talks, having long held an interest in conducting joint training operations with France along with a desire for strengthening positive political relations between the two nations. France also valued military cooperation with West Germany, wanting to break a perceived German ideological preference for American aircraft.

In 1968, a joint specification was produced out of these talks. One substantial change to the requirements was that the sought trainer was now specified to be subsonic, supersonic trainer aircraft having proven to be superfluous to practical requirements. In July 1969, a joint development and production agreement was signed between West Germany and France. Under the terms of this agreement, the two nations committed to purchasing 200 aircraft, these being domestically assembled in each of their own countries.

At one point, both the German government and the German Air Force had been keen to relocate pilot training activities from the United States to France as part of the project. In 1971, this was abandoned over fears of a hostile US reaction and West Germany's offset obligations to the United States making such a move unpalatable. While the joint Franco-German training proposal was abandoned, the German government felt obligated to proceed with the aircraft program. At the time, Germany did not require a new trainer aircraft, but needed a replacement for its fleet of Fiat G.91 attack aircraft.

Germany proposed that the aircraft be built in two distinct versions, as an inexpensive trainer for the French requirement, and as a close air support platform for the German requirement. This position was accepted by France. An initial point of contention whether to use a French or American powerplant for the aircraft was settled, with France agreeing to solely finance the development of the French-built Larzac engine while Germany agreed to adopt the same powerplant.

Three groups of manufacturers produced proposals in response to the requirement. These were Dassault, Breguet and Dornier submitted the "TA501", which had been developed through a merger of the Breguet 126 and Dornier P.375 concepts. VFW-Fokker submitted their "VFT-291" aircraft, while SNIAS/MBB submitted the "E.650 Eurotrainer". Each of these proposals were to be powered by twin SNECMA Turbomeca Larzac turbofan engines. The German Air Force insisted that the trainer have two engines after having suffered from severe aircraft attrition rates due to the high accident rate of the single-engine Lockheed F-104 Starfighter.

=== Into production ===
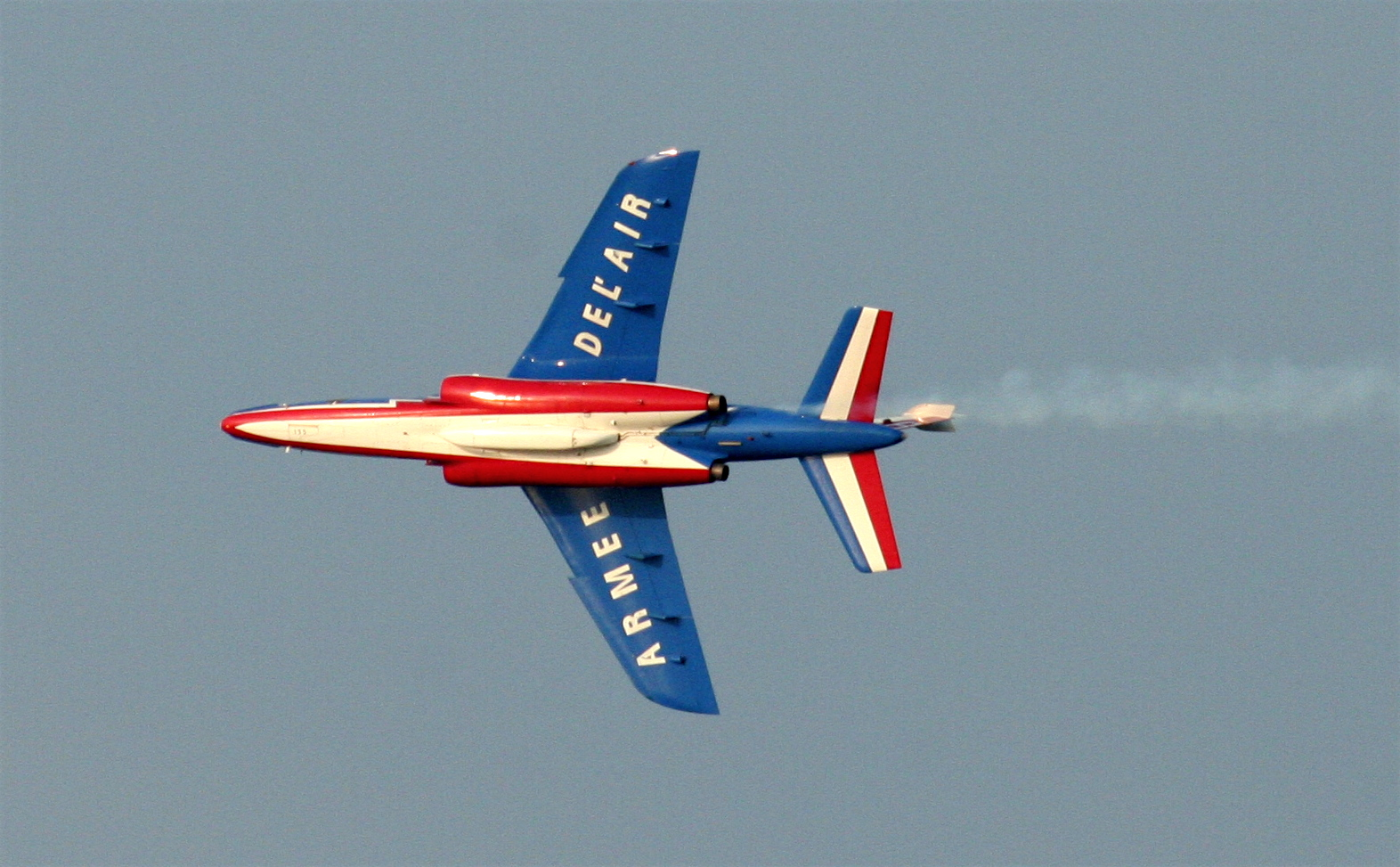
A French Alpha Jet of the Patrouille de France flight display team

On 23 July 1970, the Breguet-Dassault-Dornier TA501 was declared the winner of the competition. In February 1971, the project definition phase was completed and the integrated design team was set up at Saint-Cloud, Paris, France. That same month, a join Franco-German protocol was signed, launching the construction of four prototypes. In February 1972, the approval to proceed with full development was issued. In May 1972, the first project meeting was held in Bordeaux, at which the order for the four prototypes was placed. In November 1972, the project passed its first mock-up review. Dassault was designated as the 'pilot' company for the project and possessed final authority on design and management decisions. This approach to project management has been claimed to have been a mostly efficient manner of running the program.

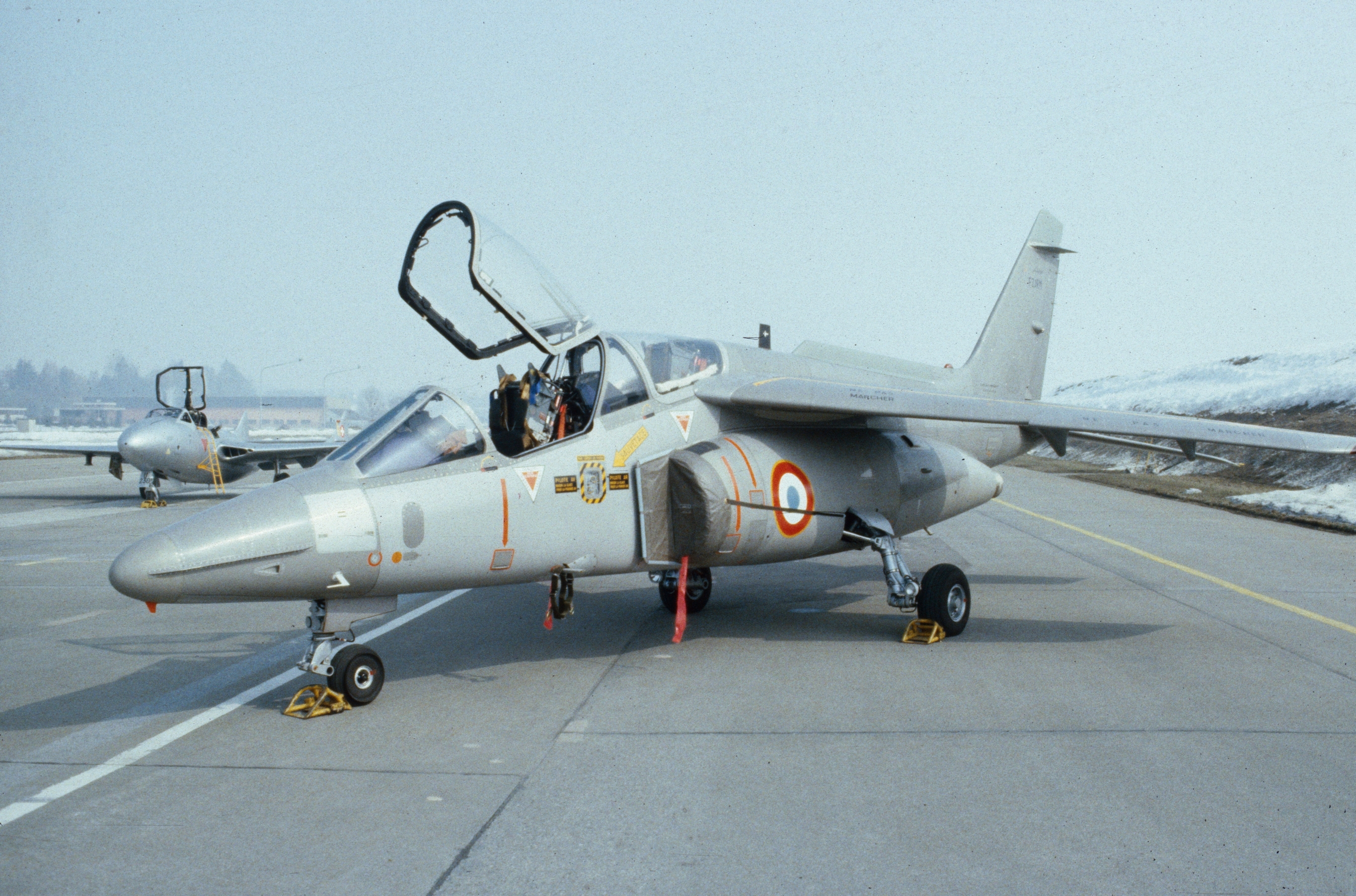
A Dassault Alpha Jet E demonstrator F-ZJRM in Emmen Switzerland, 1986

Two prototypes were to be built by Dassault in France, Dassault having bought out Breguet in the meantime, and a further two were to be built by Dornier in Germany. In October 1973, the first French prototype performed its first flight at Istres, Marseille. In January 1974, the first German prototype conducted its maiden flight from Oberpfaffenhofen, Bavaria. The remaining two prototypes were in the air before the end of 1974. The first and second prototypes were used to explore the aircraft's flight envelope, the third prototype was fitted with the French trainer equipment fit and the fourth with the German close air support equipment. The prototypes were equipped with recording and telemetry equipment packages, allowing for instrumentation readings and other useful data to be received on the ground in real time during test flights.

Manufacture of Alpha Jet sub-assemblies was divided between France (Dassault), Germany (Dornier) and Belgium (SABCA), each country performing final assembly and checkout of the type in separate facilities. Dassault hosted the largest of these three assembly lines, typically producing 13 aircraft per month to meet the needs of French and export customers. It was reportedly capable of a maximum output of 15 Alpha Jets per month. The Dornier final assembly line typically maintained a maximum rate of six aircraft per month. In contrast to the final assembly arrangements, none of the three sources duplicated the manufacture of any component: Dassault-Breguet produced the front and center fuselage, Dornier constructed the wing, tail and rear fuselage, while SABCA manufactured the nose and flaps of the aircraft. A total of 4,500 people were employed in the manufacturing of the Alpha Jet in Germany, an equal number in France also worked on the programme.

Both Belgium and Egypt, who were early export customers for the Alpha Jet, domestically performed the final assembly of their French-configuration Alpha Jet E aircraft. In September 1978, Dassault and the Arab Organization for Industrialization (AOI) signed a license manufacturing agreement for the Alpha Jet. Egyptian assembly work was carried out in a facility in Helwan, Egypt. In July 1978, Dassault signed an agreement with American aircraft manufacture Lockheed to market the Alpha Jet in the US market. The arrangement included provisions for Lockheed to manufacture the Alpha Jet under license. It was considered as a candidate for the US Navy's VTXTS advanced trainer program, eventually won by the McDonnell Douglas T-45 Goshawk, a modified version of the Hawker Siddeley Hawk. Proposed modifications included undercarriage changes for nose-tow catapults and a stronger arrestor hook, as well as various US-sourced avionics and other equipment.

On 4 November 1977, the first production aircraft made its first flight. In September 1978, deliveries of production Alpha Jets began. The four prototypes remained in service as flying testbeds, being used for further development of the type such as to evaluate a composite graphite-epoxy wing and improved versions of the Larzac engine. Prototype 01 was specifically used early on to support the development of the Larzac engine. The different avionics fit makes French and German Alpha Jets relatively easy to visually distinguish the two, with French planes featuring a rounded-off nose and German ones featuring a sharp, pointed nose.

=== Further development ===
In 1980, work began on an "Alternate Close Support" version of the Alpha Jet, featuring a SAGEM ULISS 81 INS, a Thomson-CSF VE-110 HUD, a TMV630 laser rangefinder in a modified nose and a TRT AHV 9 radio altimeter, with all avionics linked through a digital databus. The initial flight was in April 1982. Cameroon obtained seven, some sources claim 6, and Egypt obtained 15. As with the original Egyptian order for MS1 machines, Dassault provided four such machines under the designation of MS2, and AOI of Egypt assembled the other eleven from knockdown kits.

The Alpha Jet 2, originally the Alpha Jet NGEA (Nouvelle Generation Appui/Ecole or "New Generation Attack/Training") was a proposed development of the Alpha Jet. It featured the basic avionics of the MS2 plus compatibility with the advanced French Matra Magic 2 AAMs and the more powerful Larzac 04-C20 turbofans refitted to Luftwaffe Alpha Jet A aircraft. Some of the aircraft's new avionics were derived from the Dassault Mirage 2000 fighter. In 1982, it was claimed that the Alpha Jet NGEA was the "only existing aircraft in its category featuring a completely integrated digital navigation and attack system". While no new-build aircraft were produced of this variant, existing Egyptian Alpha Jets were reportedly upgraded to a similar standard. A single prototype was flown, presumably a modification of one of the original Alpha Jet prototypes. In September 1982, this aircraft made its first public appearance at the Farnborough Airshow.

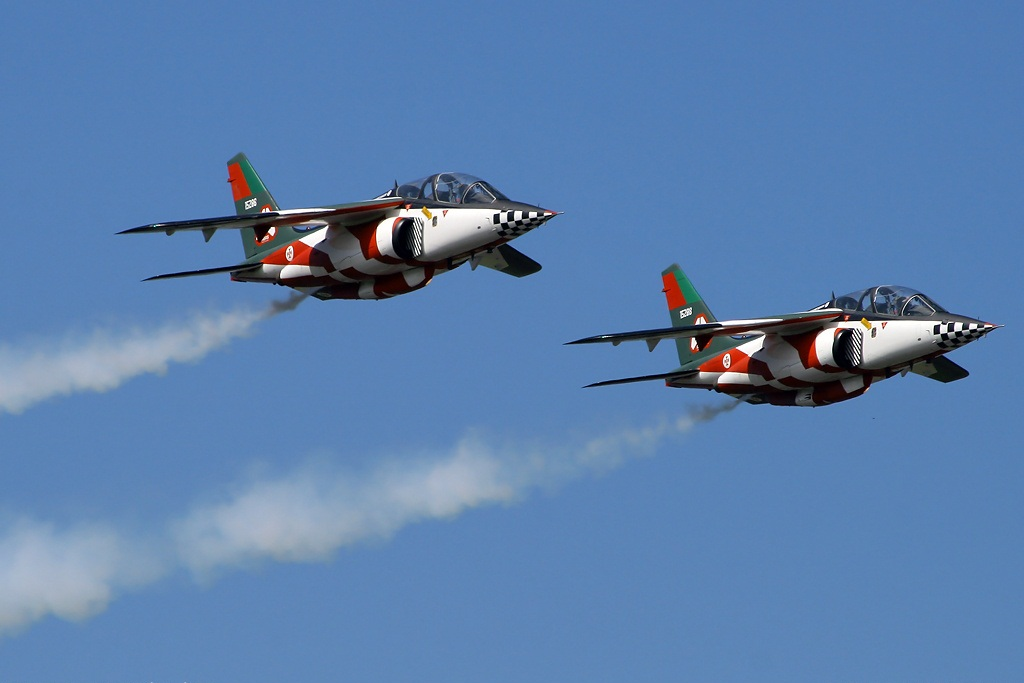
A pair of Dassault-Dornier Alpha Jet A from the extinct Asas de Portugal flight demonstration team in formation

Another proposed variant was the Alpha Jet 3 Advanced Training System, at one point given the title of "Lancier". This proposal was intended to perform all-weather ground attack operations, as well as to perform anti-shipping and anti-helicopter missions. Featured many of the same systems as the Alpha Jet 2, it was to be equipped with twin cockpit multifunction displays (MFDs) and potential carriage of AGAVE or Anemone radar, a forward-looking infrared (FLIR) imager, a laser targeting system and a modern countermeasures suite. A prototype was flown, again presumably an upgrade of an original Alpha Jet prototype.

In June 1985, Dornier announced that it was studying its own third generation Alpha Jet upgrade program, independent of Dassault. This proposed upgrade involved substantial avionics upgrades and man-machine interface alterations, such as the addition of multiple head-up displays (HUDs) to allow instructors to view what students are viewing, with the aim of being more suited for the sophisticated requirements of modern and impending fighter aircraft. Dornier judged the Alpha Jet's airframe to have been suitable without modification for future market needs.

In September 1988, Dassault revealed that it had proposed a navalised variant of the Alpha Jet, as a carrier-based trainer to the French Naval Aviation to replace their Fouga CM.175 Zéphyr and Dassault Étendard IV fleets. Designated Alpha Jet Maritime 3, it was promoted as having been fully navalised and fitted with the avionics intended for the Alpha Jet 3 Advanced Training System to give it compatibility with the upcoming next generation of carrier fighter aircraft. Carrier adaptions included the addition of an arrestor hook and a strengthened landing gear and undercarriage.

== Design ==
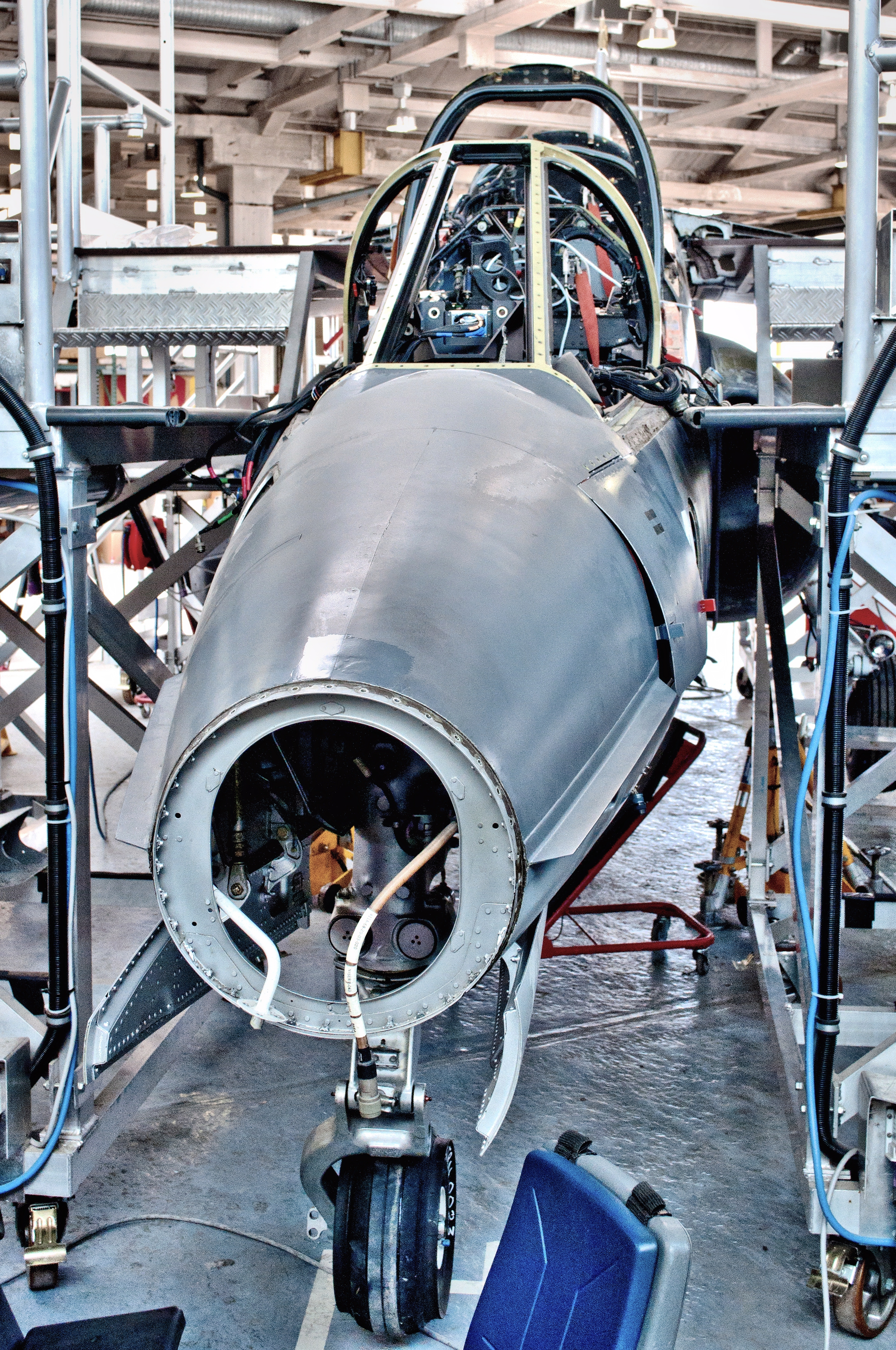
A partly disassembled Alpha Jet during maintenance

The Alpha Jet is a light twin-engine aircraft equipped with an intentionally simple airframe despite the performance delivered. Both the leading edges and air intakes are fixed; while the aerodynamic shape of the aircraft, which was developed with the aid of computer aided design (CAD), conforms with the area rule. Fully powered controls are used, comprising a dual-hydraulic systems and load-factor limited dynamic feel system arrangement attached to conventional flight control surfaces. The cockpit is pressurised for greater comfort during training. The Alpha Jet is designed to accommodate ten-minute turn around times with minimal ground equipment, using features such as pressurised single-point refueling, ladder-less entry/exit of the cockpit, and a ten-hour endurance of the liquid oxygen system.

The Alpha Jet was designed to perform a diverse range of roles. The principal users of the type, Germany and France, operated their Alpha Jets in different capacities, the German as a ground attack platform and the French as a trainer aircraft. Beyond performing different roles, the Alpha Jet fleets of France and Germany noticeably differed in their specification and equipment. German aircraft were fitted with a more extensive weapon-aiming system, a different fuel system, a yaw damper, different brakes, nosewheel steering, an arrester hook, and Stencel ejector seats in place of Martin-Baker. The majority of the specialised equipment used on the ground attack-orientated variant of the Alpha Jet was provided by German firms. In addition to the ground attack role, the Luftwaffe employed the Alpha Jet in the electronic countermeasures (ECM) and aerial reconnaissance roles; for the latter purpose, a reconnaissance pod could be fitted upon the port hardpoint.

The Alpha Jet is powered by a pair of SNECMA Turbomeca Larzac turbofan engines. It is a low bypass-ratio, twin-spool engine that uses modular construction methods. The Larzac was a new engine at the time, having only performed its first run a year prior to being selected to power the Alpha Jet. The need for greater thrust to power the aircraft than the original model of the engine could generate led to the development and adoption of the 2,970 lb Larzac 04 in February 1972. This version of the engine initially powered the Alpha Jet.

West Germany was interested in powering the type with the General Electric J85, but France objected to the use of an American engine which would result in US export restrictions upon the overall aircraft and agreed to assume the cost of developing the French-built Larzac. During the 1980s, an upgraded model of the Larzac engine which increased the thrust by 10 per cent was developed.

The avionics of the original version of the Alpha Jet were of an austere nature, partly to make it a simple and easily exportable aircraft. The basic type lacked features such as an autopilot, inertial navigation, or a radar. Later upgrade programs typically focused on the addition of a glass cockpit and other avionics systems. The Luftwaffe's Alpha Jets were equipped with additional avionics for the attack role, such as a Doppler radar and additional hardpoints. During the 1970s, Dornier claimed that the Alpha Jet outperformed aircraft used as the McDonnell Douglas F-4 Phantom II, LTV A-7 Corsair II, and Fairchild Republic A-10 Thunderbolt II in the close air support role. The firms stated that the Alpha Jet was smaller, faster, less vulnerable, more maneuverable, cheaper and had higher all-round performance than the A-10.

The Alpha Jet was more complex than competing second generation trainer aircraft, requiring seven man hours of maintenance for every flight hour. Nearly 5,000lb of munitions and equipment can be carried on five hardpoints, four on the wings and one at the centerline on the lower fuselage. In an armed configuration, a gun pod containing a 30 mm DEFA cannon, as installed on French aircraft, or 27 mm Mauser BK-27 cannon, as installed on German aircraft, would typically be installed upon the centerline hard point.

== Operational history ==
=== France ===
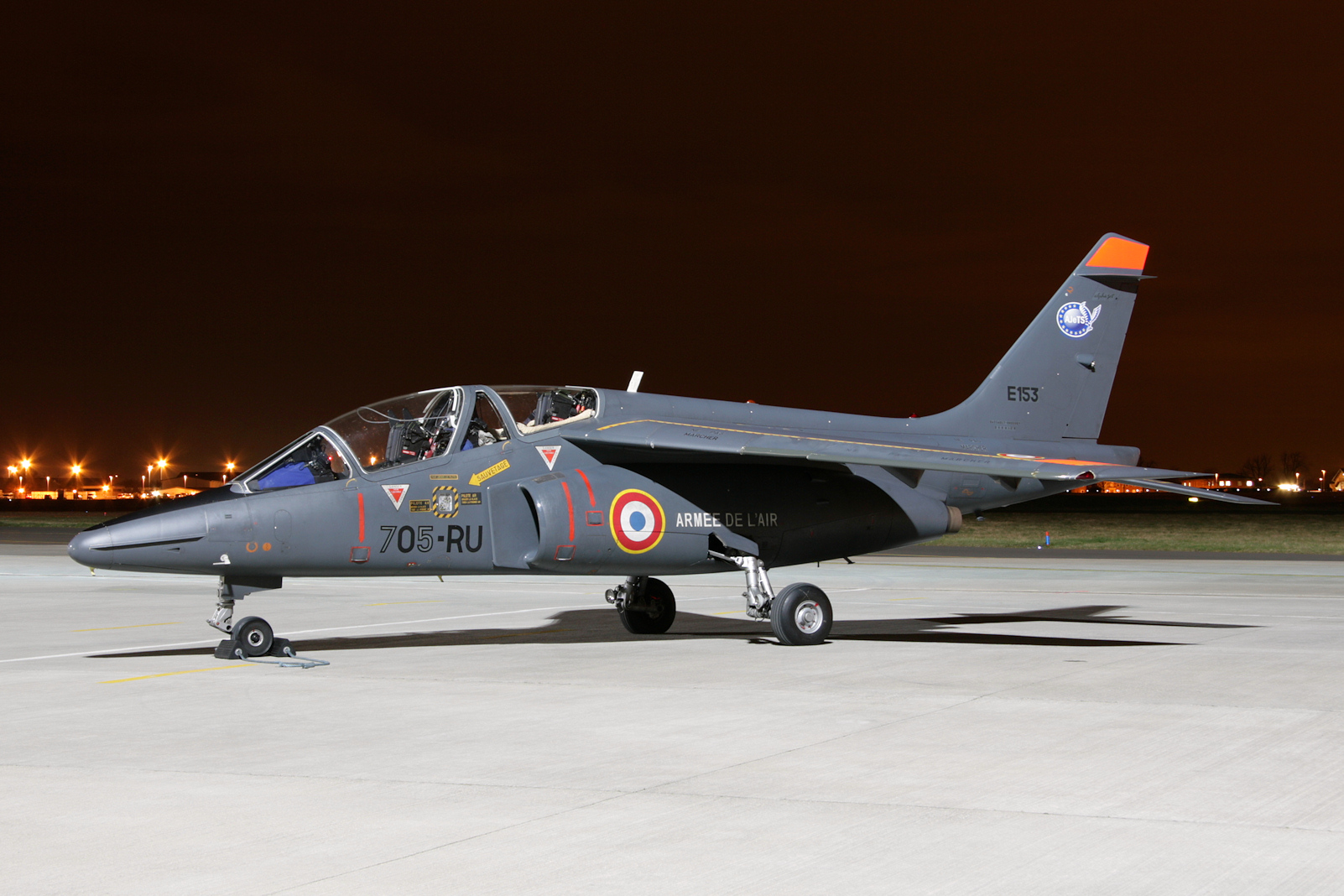
French Air Force Alpha Jet E

The French Air Force decided to use the Alpha Jet primarily as a trainer. On 4 November 1977, the first production Alpha Jet intended for French service conducted its first flight. The French variant was known as the Alpha Jet E (the "E" standing for École, French for "School") or Alpha Jet Advanced Trainer/Light Attack aircraft. The initial deliveries to France for service trials took place in 1978, lead to the type being introduced to line service in May 1979. The Alpha Jet E quickly replaced the Canadair T-33 and Fouga Magister in jet trainer role, as well as the Dassault Mystère IVA in its weapons training capacity.

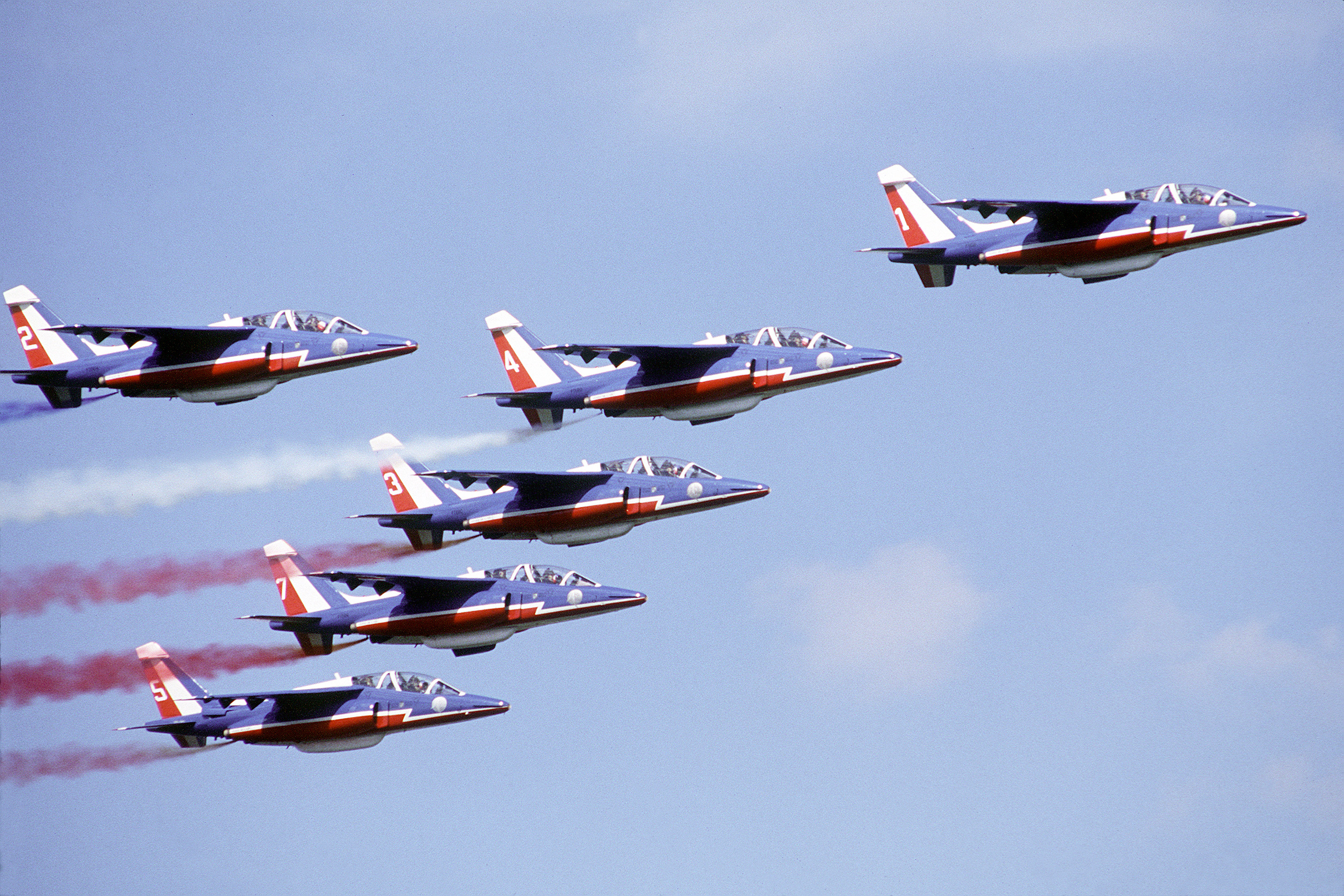
Six French Alpha Jets of the Patrouille de France flight display team flying in formation during Air Fete '88

The Patrouille de France, air demonstration team of the French Air Force, fly the Alpha Jet. A total of 176 production Alpha Jet E machines were delivered up to 1985, not the 200 that had been planned. While an excellent aircraft, French air force commanders of combat units had one complaint against the Alpha Jet, that it was a very forgiving aircraft to fly, resulting in a lengthier and steeper learning curve when assigned to fly combat aircraft which were not so forgiving.

During the early 1990s, the French Air Force investigated the Alpha Jet 3 program, which involved installing a fully digital cockpit, modernised communications suite, and a full navigation/attack and sensor training system. It was ultimately abandoned as being too expensive. In 1998, France's defence ministry examined prospective upgrades focused on the Alpha Jet's cockpit, such as the installation of a new Head-Up Display (HUD) and multifunction displays.

In June 2003, Dassault revealed its plans for an Alpha Jet upgrade to potentially meet the French Air Force's long term training requirements. This upgrade was similar to that which was performed for the Belgian Air Force's Alpha Jet fleet, involving the installation of a glass cockpit, increasing cockpit compatibility with frontline aircraft such as the Dassault Rafale and Dassault Mirage 2000, as well as a structural overhaul.

In September 2014, Direction générale de l'armement (DGA) and French Air Force officials were reportedly investigating the Alenia Aermacchi M-346 Master as a replacement for the Alpha Jet. Alenia Aermacchi claimed that France was interested in procuring 35 M-346s in this capacity. In April 2015, the DGA issued an initial pre-solicitation request for a replacement trainer aircraft. Likely candidates for this requirement reportedly include the M-346 Master, Aero L-39 Albatros, Beechcraft T-6 Texan II and Pilatus PC-21. The PC-21 was introduced in 2018.

In 2023, France retired the Alpha Jet for student pilot training but still uses them for adversary roles at Cazaux Air Base. 8 Alpha Jets are also in service for the Patrouille de France flight display team.

=== West Germany / Germany ===
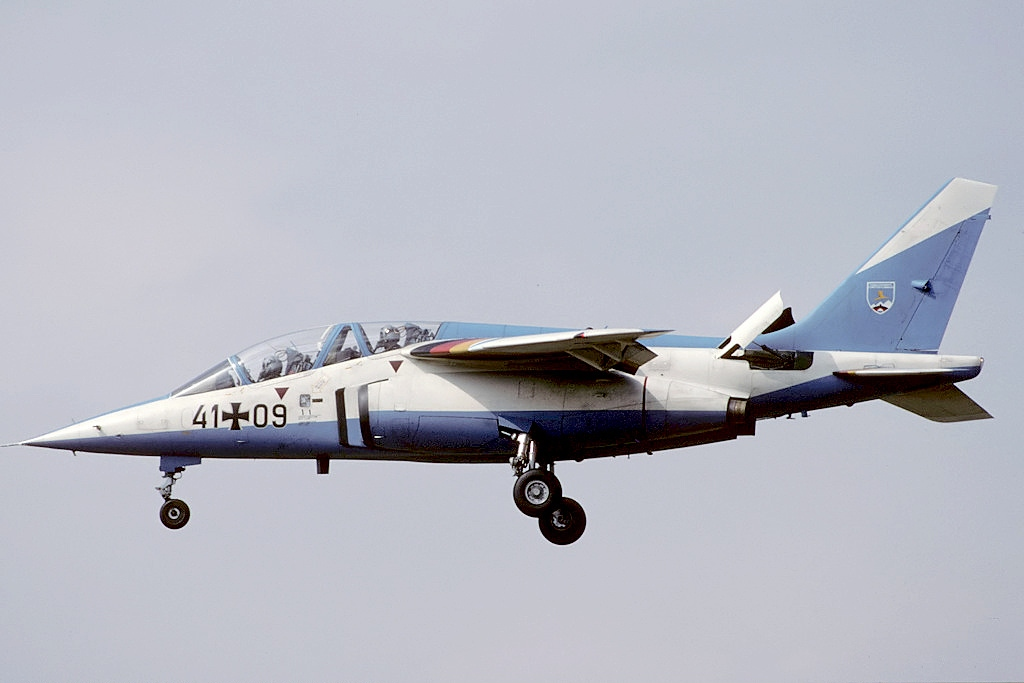
A German Air Force Alpha Jet prior to landing at RAF Fairford, Gloucestershire, England, 1991

The Luftwaffe decided to use the Alpha Jet mainly in the light strike role, preferring to continue flight training in the southwestern United States on American trainer types instead of performing training in Germany, although Germany also used Alpha Jets based at Beja, Portugal for weapons training. On 12 April 1978, the first production German Alpha Jet performed its maiden flight, deliveries commenced in March 1979. It was designated the Alpha Jet A (the "A" standing for Appui Tactique or "Tactical Support") or Alpha Jet Close Support variant. The Luftwaffe obtained a total of 175 aircraft up to 1983, the type was used to replace the Fiat G91R/3 fleet.

In 1985, West Germany began a comprehensive upgrade program, known as the Improved Combat Efficiency (ICE) program, for their Alpha Jet fleet; these upgrades were to involve the installation of a Mil Spec 1553B databus, new sensors integrated with the navigation/attack systems, modernized electronic countermeasures suite, measures to minimize the aircraft's radar and infrared signatures, protection measures around the fuel system, and new armaments such as the AGM-65 Maverick. In 1988, it was announced that the ICE program has been cancelled. A more austere upgrade program did proceed in its place, which integrated the AIM-9L Sidewinder air-to-air missile and navigation computer upgrades, along with several minor airframe and equipment refinements, such as the addition of a jettisonable gun pod.

During the 1991 Gulf War, 18 German Alpha Jets were deployed to Turkey alongside 6 Italian F-104s and Belgian Mirage 5s under a NATO-based operation to protect Turkey against potential Iraqi attacks.

In 1992, the Luftwaffe began to phase out their Alpha Jet A aircraft, reserving 45 for lead-in fighter training. In 1993, a total of 50 were passed on to Portugal to replace the Northrop T-38 Talon and Fiat G.91 fleets, with five of these used for spares. The rest of the Luftwaffe's Alpha Jets were gradually phased out, the last leaving service in 1998, and customers were sought to buy them. In October 1995, the German military offered 42 Alpha Jets to Poland for 143 million PLN. In 1999, 25 Alpha Jets were sold to Thailand at 1 million baht ($27,000) each, replacing the North American OV-10 Bronco in the border patrol role; while the British Defence Evaluation and Research Agency obtained 12 as chase aircraft and flight test platforms due to a shortage in available BAE Systems Hawk aircraft for the role.

Germany was keen to sell the retired Alpha Jets quickly since they were reported as costing around DM100,000 ($55,000) to keep in storage each month. Fairchild-Dornier received a US$43 million contract to refurbish a number of the aircraft and provide support to the end users. Apparently 32 more, including two spares hulks, were sold to the United Arab Emirates, though details are unclear. Several were also sold to private owners, such as those used by the Austrian-based Flying Bulls flight demonstration team, which flies a range of classic aircraft.

=== Nigeria ===
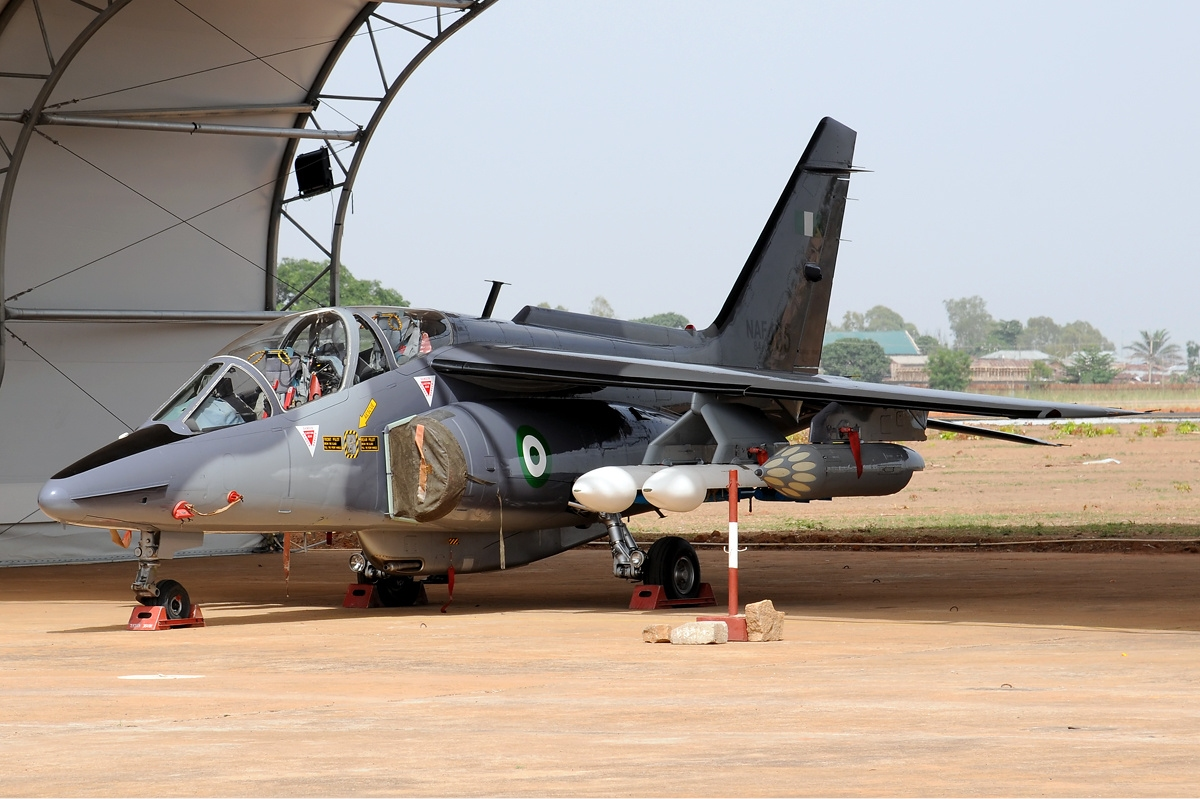
Nigerian Alpha Jet at Old Kaduna Airport, Kaduna State, Nigeria, 2012

In 1990, four Alpha Jets of the Nigerian Air Force were deployed in support of Economic Community of West African States Monitoring Group (ECOMOG) forces stationed in Liberia, which were engaged in combat with the National Patriotic Front of Liberia (NPFL) following an international intervention in the Liberian Civil War. In a series of strikes, these aircraft targeted and launched successful attacks upon Charles Taylor's HQ, rebel convoys and shipping, and gun emplacements at Roberts International Airport; the results of their intervention was judged by The New York Times to have given ECOMOG forces a decisive advantage in fire power.

In 1992, six Nigerian Alpha Jets were placed directly under ECOMOG command, and employed against the NPLF in an extensive campaign of air strikes, road interdictions missions, anti-shipping sorties, and night raids (a task which the Alpha Jet was not normally equipped to perform). They were even employed to deny access to key bridges in order to give ECOMOG ground forces time to capture them before they were sabotaged. In total, Alpha Jets flew approximately 3,000 combat missions in support of ECOMOG, sustaining no losses but incurring some damage from anti-aircraft artillery.

In 2013, Nigeria began taking steps to bring its Alpha Jet fleet back into service, upgrading 13 of the original 24 into serviceable condition, due to an urgent need for strike aircraft to participate in air support missions for counterinsurgency operations against Boko Haram. In March 2016, Nigerian car manufacturer Innoson Vehicle Manufacturing (IVM) signed a supply agreement with the Nigerian Air Force to produce components and various spare parts for the Alpha Jet. In 2015, Nigeria ordered four additional aircraft from the United States; these aircraft had been de-militarized and prepared for civilian operations, however Nigeria had reportedly returned two of these to an unspecified armed configuration by early 2016.

The restored Alpha Jet force has been routinely employed in combat air patrols, and has conducted multiple air strikes against Boko Haram militants over a number of years. In September 2014, multiple Alpha Jets conducted a large number of aerial bombardment missions over and around the area of Bama, Borno State, during the fight to regain the city following the withdrawal of friendly ground forces. In early October 2014, Boko Haram released a video containing the decapitation of who they claimed was a captured Nigerian Air Force pilot of a downed Alpha Jet. In March 2016, attacks performed by Nigerian Alpha Jets had reportedly dislodged Boko Haram fighters from Sambisa Forest, Borno State.

On 31 March 2021, a Nigerian Air Force Alpha jet (NAF475) went missing near Borno State in northeastern Nigeria while carrying out air support for Nigerian troops fighting against Boko Haram, both pilots were missing, presumed dead. A video was released claiming to show the jet being shot down, however the video was evidently doctored including previous clips from Syria. The Nigerian Air Force attributed the crash to an accident, pending further investigation. However the video showed Boko Haram fighters at the crash site and remains of the pilots.

On 18 July 2021, in a rare occurrence of a military jet downed by a criminal organization, an Alpha jet was shot down after conducting an interdiction mission on the border of the states of Zamfara and Kaduna against criminal gangs. The military blamed intense fire from armed gangs for the shoot down. The pilot ejected and returned to an Army base, after evading capture.

=== Belgium ===
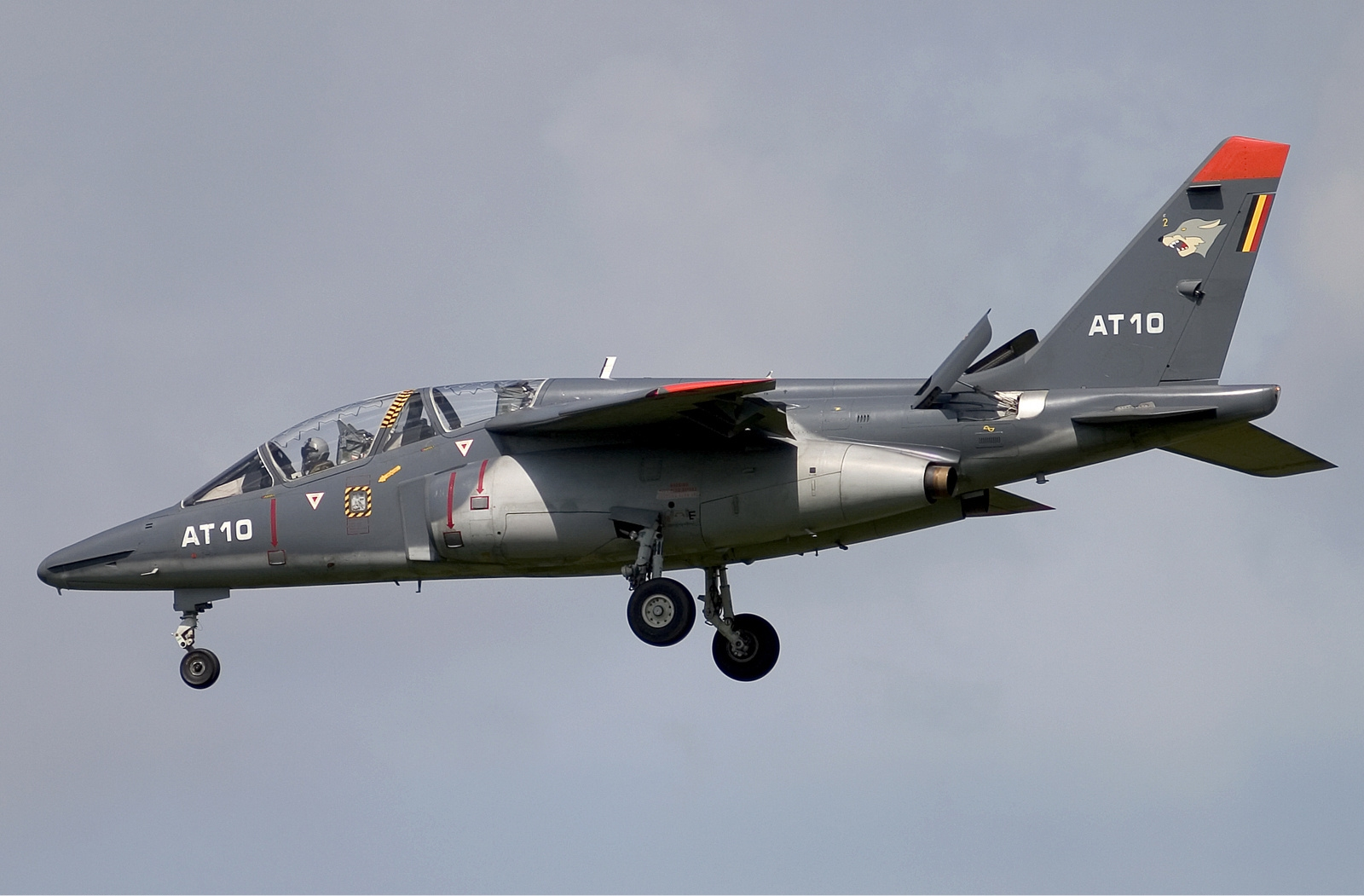
A Belgium Air Force Alpha Jet 1B at Beauvechain Air Base, Belgium, 2004

On 13 September 1973, the Belgian defence minister announced that 33 Alpha Jets had been ordered in two batches of 16 and 17 aircraft. These aircraft were given the designation Alpha Jet 1B, the assembly work being performed by Belgian aircraft manufacturer SABCA. Deliveries took place between 1978 and 1980. By April 1981, the Belgian Air Force had reportedly accumulated 10,000 flight hours on their 33 Alpha Jets during training operations. The introduction of the Alpha Jet led to the retirement of Belgium's Fouga CM.170 Magister fleet; changes to the training syllabus included the adoption of a new discipline, combined flight, as well as a greater use of flight simulators.

During the late 1990s and 2000s, SABCA performed a number of upgrades on the Belgian aircraft to the Alpha Jet 1B+ configuration; improvements made included the addition of a laser-gyro inertial navigation system, a GPS receiver, a HUD in the front cockpit and a HUD repeater in the rear, a video recorder and other more minor improvements. In 2000, the initial Alpha Jet 1B+ was re-delivered to the Belgian Air Force.

The Alpha Jet was phased out in 2019. The next year 25 airframes and several spare parts were sold to the Canadian company Top Aces which provides adversary air combat training.Top Aces acquires 25 Belgian Air Force Alpha Jets

=== Egypt ===
On 17 September 1978, Dassault and the Arab Organization for Industrialization (AOI) signed a license manufacturing agreement for the Alpha Jet; at the time, it was projected that up to 160 Alpha Jets would be domestically produced in Helwan, Egypt. Shortly thereafter, Egypt placed an initial order for 30 aircraft, designated Alpha Jet MS1, which were to a standard trainer configuration. Four complete aircraft were directly supplied from Dassault's facility in France, while the remaining 26 of the order were domestically assembled in Egypt using knockdown kits by AOI.

During the early 1980s, an additional 15 aircraft, designated Alpha Jet MS2, were ordered. The Alpha Jet MS2 bore high levels of similarity to Dassault's proposed Alpha Jet NGEA, featuring a Sagem-built Uliss 81 nav/attack system, a Thomson-CSF-built laser rangefinder and HUD, along with a digital multiplex databus. The Egyptian Air Force Alpha Jets were based at As Salahiya airbase in 308 (Close Air Support) Tactical Wing with 57 Squadron and 58 Squadron. In 2015 the 308 CAS Tactical Wing moved with both squadrons to El Mansoura airbase for ground attack training. The Egyptian Air Force used the Alpha Jet MS1 fleet to replace the Aero L-29 Delfín and Mikoyan-Gurevich MiG-15 in the trainer role, while the later-built MS2 standard aircraft served to replace the Mikoyan-Gurevich MiG-17 in the ground-attack role. In February 2000, Egypt was reportedly seeking to replace their Alpha Jet fleet, and was investigating several options, including the BAE Systems Hawk.

=== Civilian service ===
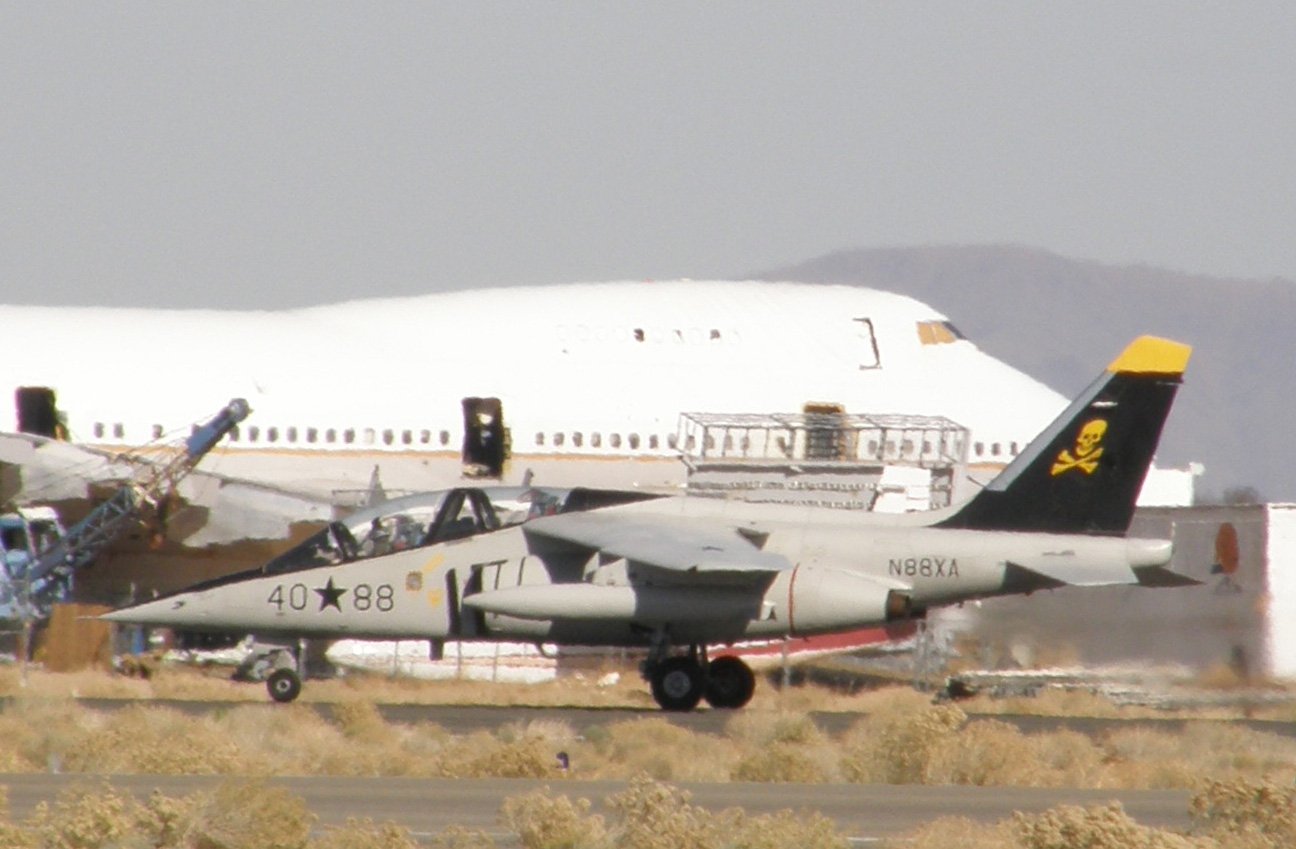
An Alpha Jet imported by Abbatare lands at the Mojave Airport

Swiss firm RUAG Aviation offers full support services for the Alpha Jet in cooperation with Dassault Aviation; services provided includes recommissioning, servicing, inspections, system upgrades integration work, along with technical and logistic support. Abbatare Inc. of Arlington, Washington, under the name of "Alpha Jets USA", has imported a number of Alpha Jets into the United States, the firm modifies and sells individual aircraft in the civilian market.

Canadian aviation specialist Top Aces operates a fleet of Douglas A-4 Skyhawks and Alpha Jets as adversary aircraft in air combat training exercises; these are often operated under contract for various military clients. Multiple civil aerial display teams have procured Alpha Jets, such as the Flying Bulls and Mustang High Flight Aerobatics teams. H211, a private company which manages the planes owned and leased by Google execs Larry Page, Sergey Brin, and Eric Schmidt, operates a single Alpha Jet, based at NASA's Ames Research Center in Mountain View, California. It is reportedly equipped with scientific instrumentation and used for research purposes.

Commencing in the third quarter of 2017, Air Affairs Australia and Discovery Air will provide three Alpha Jets to the Australian Defence Force for Australian Army attack controller training and anti-surface training (simulating sea-skimming missiles) for the Royal Australian Navy. They will be based at RAAF Base Williamtown.

=== Others ===
Considerable foreign sales were expected for the Alpha Jet, with the type becoming available before its main rival, the United Kingdom's BAE Systems Hawk. The two types, being relatively similar in role and specifications, ended up competing for many of the same contracts. This competition led to an aviation commentator stating of the two aircraft:

What Europe must avoid is the kind of wasteful competition that has the Hawker Siddeley Hawk and Dassault-Breguet/Dornier Alpha Jet battling against each other in the world market.

— John W. R. Taylor, Jane's All the World's Aircraft 1975–1976

Several other nations also obtained the Alpha Jet E, including the Ivory Coast (seven aircraft), Morocco (24), Nigeria (24), Qatar (six) and Togo (five). All of these machines were from French production except for the 24 Nigerian aircraft, which were from German production.

Between 1979 and 1981, the Royal Moroccan Air Force received 24 Alpha Jets which were organized into a training squadron and a COIN squadron both based in Meknes. Alpha Jets were employed in strike missions against the Polisario Front during the Western Sahara War, one of their number being shot down in December, 1985.

== Variants ==
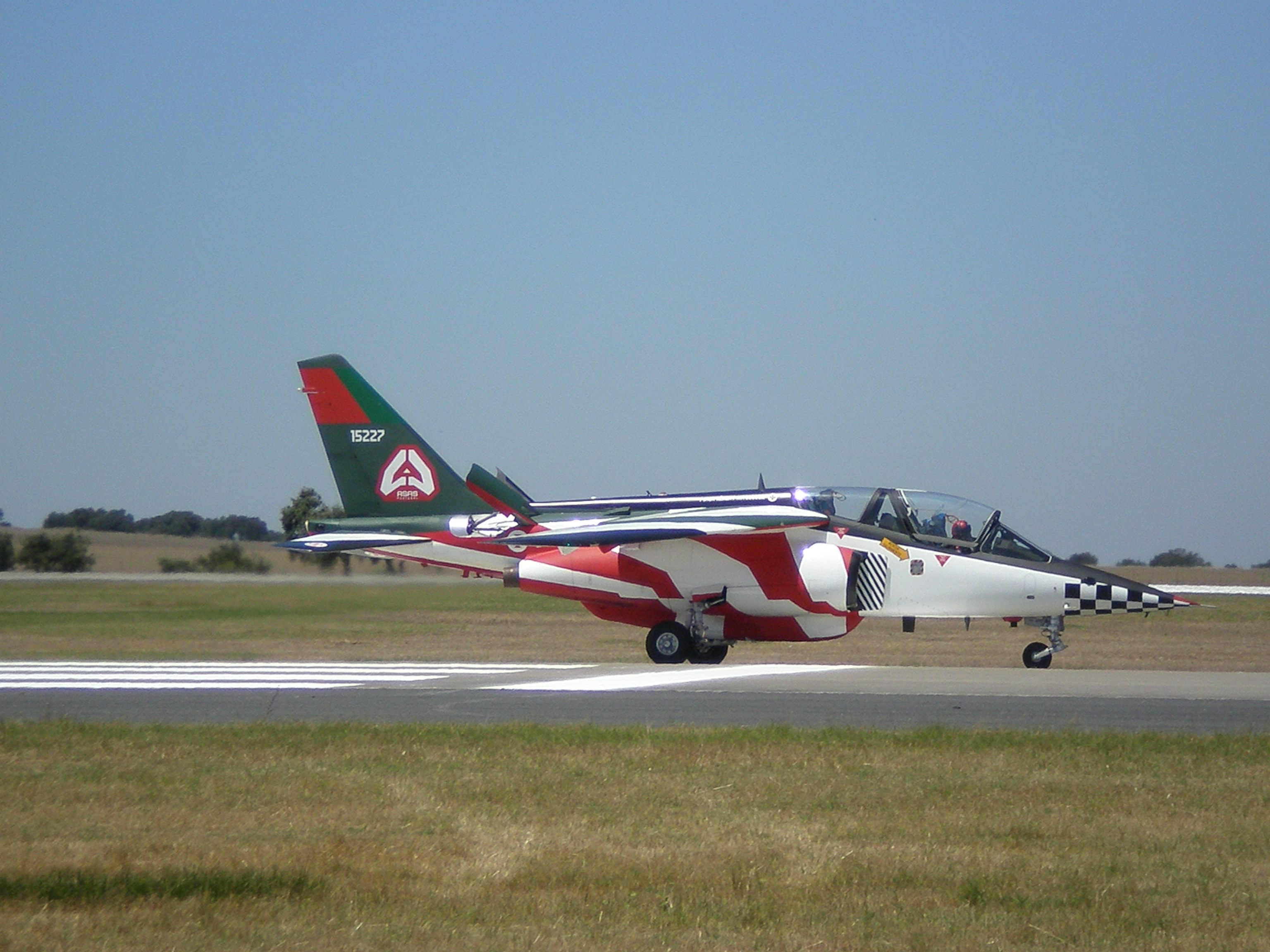
Portuguese Air Force Alpha Jet A of the Asas de Portugal flight display team

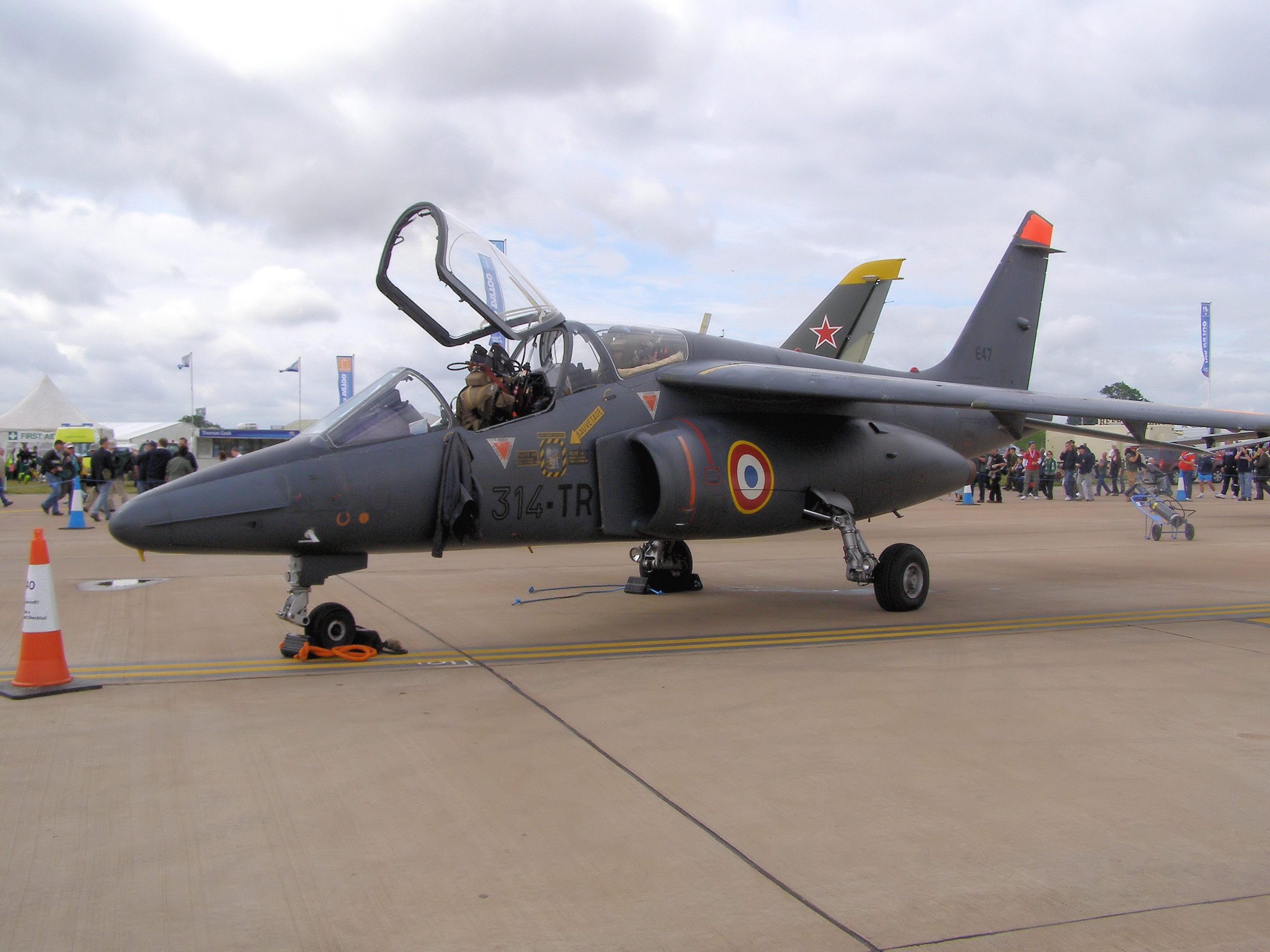
French Air Force Alpha Jet E

- Alpha Jet A: Attack version originally used by Germany.
- Alpha Jet E: Trainer version originally used by France and Belgium.
- Alpha Jet 2: Development of the Alpha Jet E optimized for ground attack. This version was originally named the Alpha Jet NGAE (Nouvelle Generation Appui/Ecole or "New Generation Attack/Training"),
- Alpha Jet MS1: Close support-capable version assembled in Egypt.
- Alpha Jet MS2: Improved version with new avionics, an uprated engine, Magic Air-to-Air missiles, and a Lancier glass cockpit.
- Alpha Jet ATS (Advanced Training System): A version fitted with multi-functional controls and a glass cockpit that will train pilots in the use of navigation and attack systems of the latest and future generation fighter aircraft. This version was also called the Alpha Jet 3 or Lancier.
- Alpha Jet Al-Ghait: A single Moroccan Alpha Jet E modified with a Sperry/Honeywell Primus 300SL weather radar; known as Al-Ghait (The Rain). and an AN/ALE-40 chaff-flare dispenser, modified for cloud seeding.
- B.J.7: (Thai: บ.จ.๑) Thai designation for the Alpha Jet A.
- Alpha Jet TST A single Alpha Jet A (98+33) modified with a single-seat cockpit and an experimental transonic wing (Transonischer Tragflügel) used for experiments at the WTD-61 test center starting in 1982.

== Operators ==
Cameroon

- Cameroon Air Force (Alpha Jet MS2) – 27 (12 are in service)

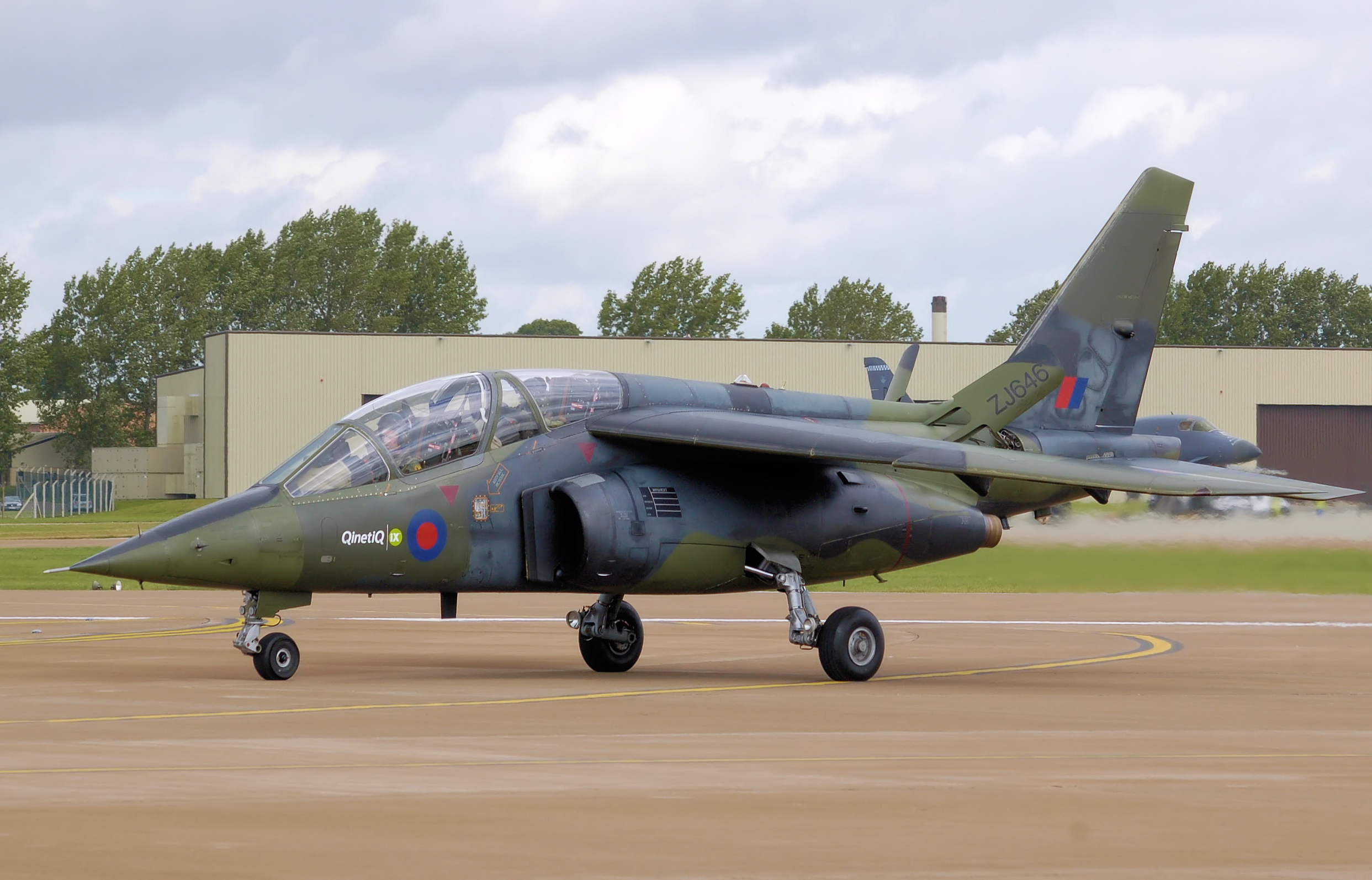
A QinetiQ-operated Alpha Jet A

Canada

- Top Aces – 30 Alpha Jet A (former Luftwaffe and QineticQ aircraft) based in Montreal. With 19 operating as airborne training assets under contract to the Canadian Forces and Bundeswehr. Including use as an electronic warfare platform in cooperation with Engility and 414 Squadron. Also 25 Alpha Jet E acquired from Belgium.

Egypt

- Egypt Air Force (Alpha Jet MS2 and E) – 14 MS2 and 40 E (MS1), All upgraded to (MS2)

France

- French Air and Space Force (Alpha Jet E) – 85 as of 2025
- Patrouille De France (8)
- Alpha Jet Squadrons at Cazaux Air Base:
- Escadron de Transition Opérationnelle 1/8 Saintonge
- Escadron de Transition Opérationnelle 2/8 Nice
- Escadron d'Entraînement 3/8 Côte d'Or

Morocco

- Royal Moroccan Air Force (Alpha Jet E) – 24 acquired, 1 shot down in December 1985, another one crashed during in exercise in June 2025. 22 are in service.

Nigeria

- Nigerian Air Force (Alpha Jet E) – 24 acquired. 4 upgraded in 2011, 9 more reactivated. 11 in service.

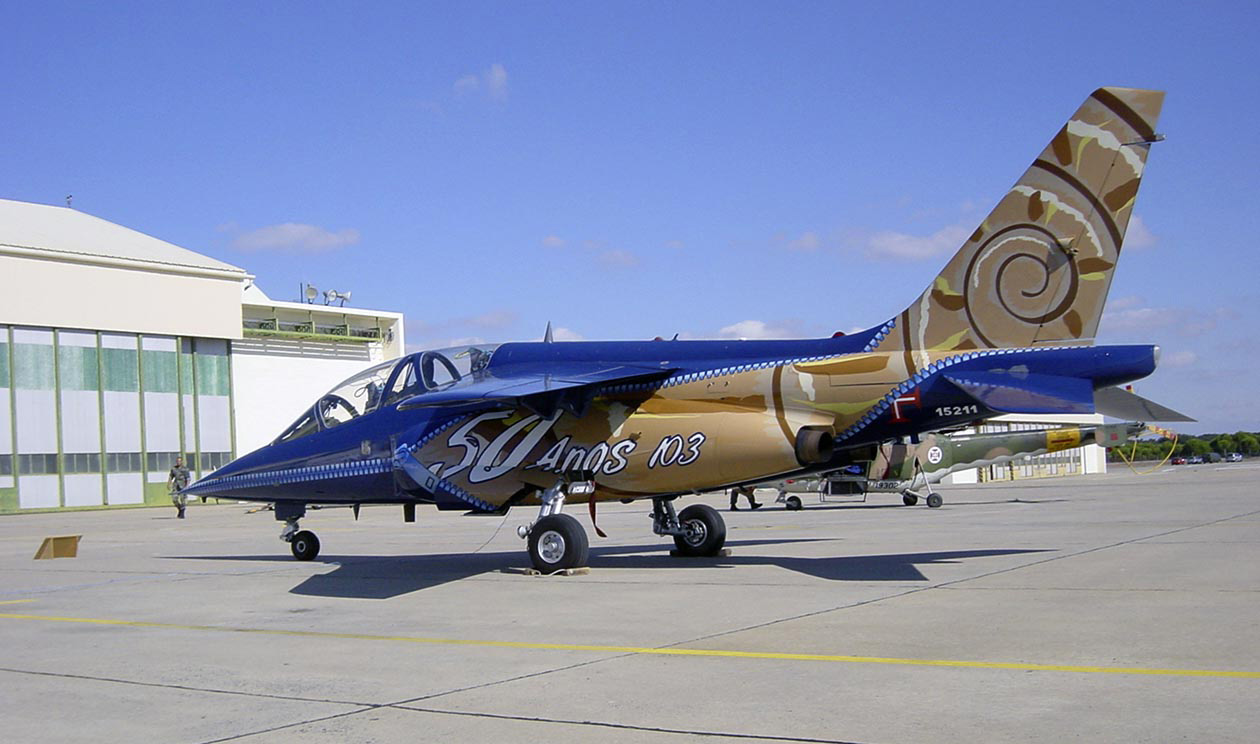
A Portuguese Air Force Alpha Jet with commemorative livery of 103 Squadron's 50th anniversary

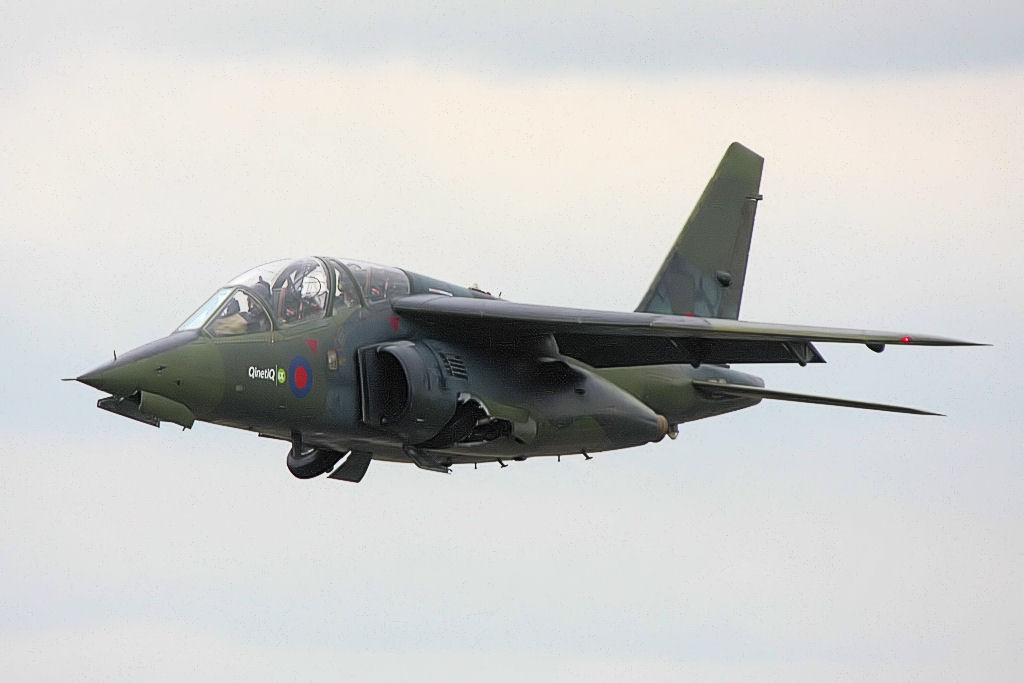
An Alpha Jet at the 2008 Royal International Air Tattoo (RIAT)

Qatar

- Qatar Emiri Air Force (Alpha Jet E) – six

Thailand

- Royal Thai Air Force (19 Alpha Jet A – former Luftwaffe aircraft)

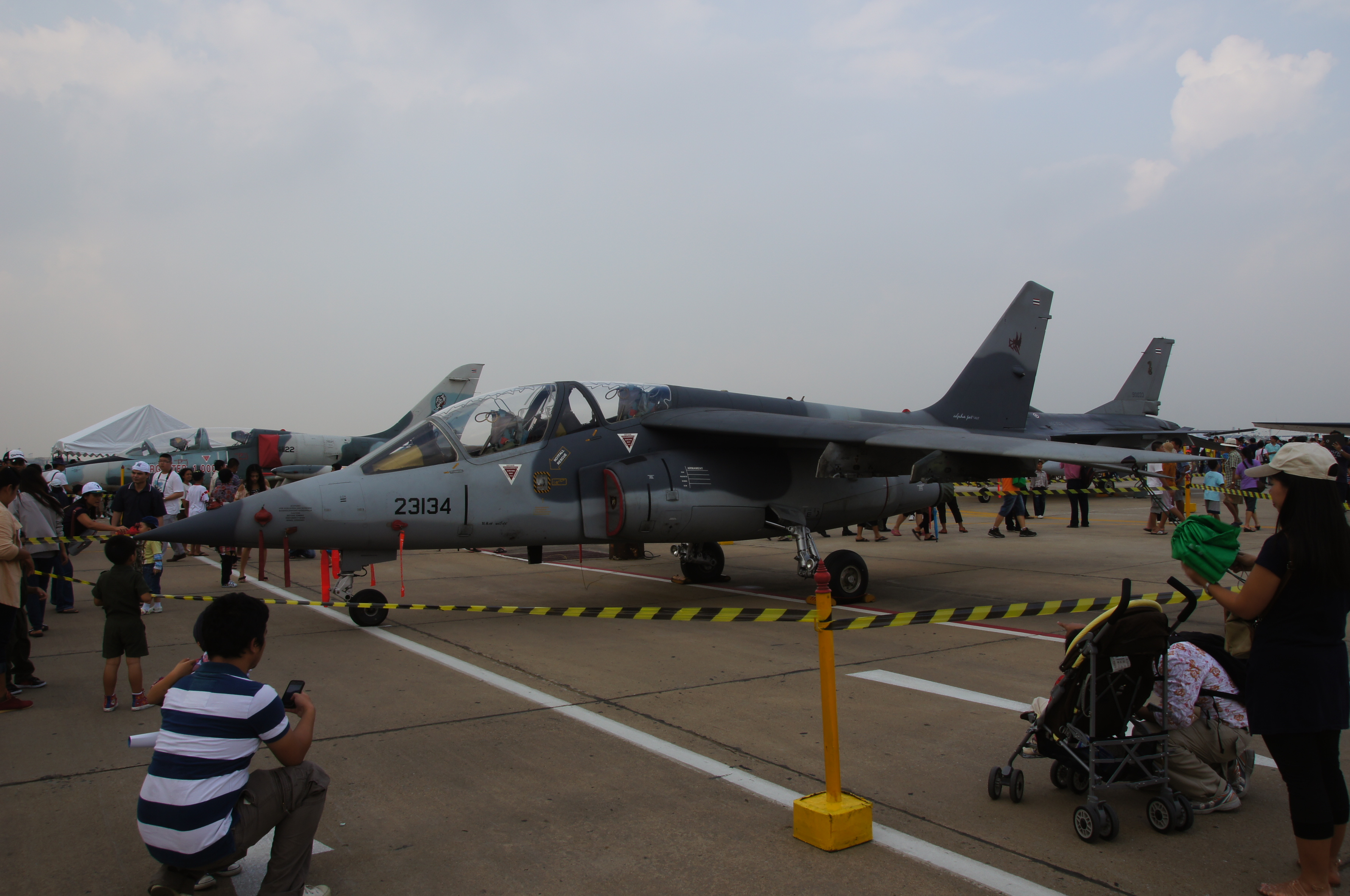
A Royal Thai Air Force Alpha Jet in 2013

Togo

- Togo Air Force – 5 (Alpha Jet E)

=== Former operators ===
Australia

- Air Affairs/Top Aces - 3 (Former Luftwaffe Alpha Jet A) provided by Top Aces. Operated in support of Australian Defence Force training.

Belgium

- Belgian Air Component (Alpha Jet E) – 33 acquired in 1978, phased out 2019. Last remaining 25 sold to Top Aces

Germany

- German Air Force – 93 (Alpha Jet A)

Ivory Coast

- Côte d'Ivoire Air Force – 7 (Alpha Jet E)

Portugal

- Portuguese Air Force – 50 (Alpha Jet A, former Luftwaffe aircraft) acquired 1993. Retired 13 January 2018.

United Kingdom

- QinetiQ – (Alpha Jet A) 12 former Luftwaffe aircraft - retired 31 January 2018. Of these 12, only 6 flew. Whole fleet sold to Top Aces

== Specifications (Close-support version) ==
Orthographic projection of the Alpha Jet

External image
- Dassault/Dornier Alpha Jet cutaway
- Hi-res cutaway of the Dassault/Dornier Alpha Jet by Flight Global

Data from Jane's All The World's Aircraft 1982-83, and Flight International

General characteristics

- Crew: 2
- Length: 13.23 m (43 ft 5 in)
- Wingspan: 9.11 m (29 ft 11 in)
- Height: 4.19 m (13 ft 9 in)
- Wing area: 17.5 m^{2} (188 sq ft)
- Aspect ratio: 4.8
- Empty weight: 3,515 kg (7,749 lb)
- Gross weight: 5,000 kg (11,023 lb)
- Max takeoff weight: 7,500 kg (16,535 lb)
- Fuel capacity: 1,520 kg (3,351 lb)
- Powerplant: 2 × SNECMA Turbomeca Larzac 04-C5 turbofan engines, 13.24 kN (2,980 lbf) thrust each

Performance

- Maximum speed: 1,000 km/h (620 mph, 540 kn) at sea level
- Stall speed: 167 km/h (104 mph, 90 kn) (flaps and undercarriage down)

216 km/h (134 mph; 117 kn) (flaps and undercarriage up)

- Combat range: 610 km (380 mi, 330 nmi) lo-lo-lo profile, gun pod, underwing weapons and two drop tanks

1,095 km (680 mi; 591 nmi) hi-lo-hi profile, gun pod, underwing weapons and two drop tanks

- Ferry range: 2,940 km (1,830 mi, 1,590 nmi) with 2x 310 L (82 US gal; 68 imp gal) droptanks
- Endurance: (internal fuel only) 2 hours 30 minutes at low altitude; 3 hours 30 minutes at high altitude
- Service ceiling: 14,630 m (48,000 ft)
- g limits: +12 / -6.4 (ultimate)
- Rate of climb: 57 m/s (11,200 ft/min) max
- Time to altitude: 9,145 m (30,000 ft) in less than 7 minutes
- Landing speed: 170 km/h (110 mph; 92 kn)
- Take-off run: 410 m (1,350 ft)
- Landing run: 610 m (2,000 ft)

Armament

- Guns: One 27 mm Mauser BK-27 cannon in centreline gun pack with 150 rounds or one 30 mm DEFA cannon in centreline pod with 150 rounds
- Hardpoints: 5 with a capacity of 2,500 kg (5,512 lb), with provisions to carry combinations of:
  - Rockets: Two Matra rocket pods with eighteen SNEB 68 mm rockets each or two CRV7 rocket pods with nineteen 70 mm rockets each
  - Missiles: Two AIM-9 Sidewinders; two Matra Magic IIs; two AGM-65 Mavericks
  - Bombs: a variety of bombs (such as the Hunting BL755 cluster bomb)
  - Other: Two 310 L (82 US gal; 68 imp gal) Drop tanks

== See also ==
External videos
- Red Bull Alpha Jet performing an aerial display over Athens, Greece, in 2013
- Extensive footage of German Alpha Jet operations in the early 1990s
- Guided tour of the cockpit of an Alpha Jet

- EADS Mako/HEAT

Related development

- FMA IA-63 Pampa – (Argentina)

Aircraft of comparable role, configuration, and era

- Aermacchi S-211 – (Italy)
- Aero L-39 Albatros – (Czechoslovakia)
- BAE Hawk – (United Kingdom)
- CASA C-101 – (Spain)
- IAR-99 – (Romania)
- Hongdu JL-8 – (China, Pakistan)
- Kawasaki T-4 – (Japan)
- Mitsubishi T-2 – (Japan)
- PZL I-22 Iryda – (Poland)
- Soko G-4 Super Galeb – (Yugoslavia)
