= Escadron d'Entraînement 3/8 Côte d'Or =

Training Squadron 3/8 Côte d'Or
- Escadron d'Entraînement 3/8 Côte d'Or
- Country: France
- Branch: Armée de l'air et de l'espace
- Type: Trainer aircraft
- Role: Training Squadron
- Garrison/HQ: Cazaux Air Base

Aircraft flown
- Trainer: Dassault/Dornier Alpha Jet

Escadron d'Entraînement 3/8 Côte d'Or is a French Air and Space Force (Armée de l'air et de l'espace) Training Squadron located at Cazaux Air Base, Gironde, France which operates the Dassault/Dornier Alpha Jet.

== See also ==
- List of French Air and Space Force aircraft squadrons
