= Patrouille de France =

- Patrouille de France
- Active: Active since 1931: Patrouille d'Étampes; Patrouille de l'École de l'Air; Patrouille de France (official demonstration); 14 September 1931 – Present
- Country: France
- Branch: French Air and Space Force
- Role: Aerobatic flight display team
- Size: 10 Alpha Jets out of which 8 in flight (total size 41)
- Base: Base Aérienne 701 Salon-de-Provence, Bouches-du-Rhône, France
- Nickname: La PAF
- Colors: Blue, white and red
- Equipment: Alpha Jet

Commanders
- Notable commanders: 1st Commandant of the Patrouille in 1953; Général de corps aérien Pierre Delachenal

Aircraft flown
- Trainer: 1953–1954 Republic F-84; 1954–1957 Dassault Ouragan; 1957–1964 Dassault Mystère IV; 1964–1981 Fouga Magister; 1981–present Dassault/Dornier Alpha Jet

The Patrouille acrobatique de France (French pronunciation: [patʁuj akʁɔbatik də fʁɑ̃s], "French Acrobatic Patrol"), also known as the Patrouille de France (PAF), is the precision aerobatics demonstration unit of the French Air and Space Force, officially commissioned in 1953.

Using the French Aerial Aerobatics (French: Voltige aérienne Française) unit of the French Air and Space Force, the mission is to represent it and lead the ambassadorship role of French aeronautics overseas. Stationed at Aerial Base 701 Salon-de-Provence in Bouches-du-Rhône, it is the oldest (active since 1931) and considered one of the best in the world. Comprising 9 pilots and 35 mechanics, the patrol (La Patrouille) splits its time between winter season (saison hivernale) training and summer season (saison estivale) aerial displays.

The unit traditionally opens the Bastille Day military parade in Paris with nine Alpha Jets, presenting a twenty-minute demonstration of formation changes and crossovers narrated by the director of the French Air Force presentation team, also a jet pilot as well as the public relations officer. Each maneuver is filmed by a photo and video specialist, as a pilot is also usually present (often the replacement pilot), supervising the communications between the PAF and the controller for flight safety.

== History ==
=== Early beginnings ===
In 1931, the first aerial demonstration (démonstration aérienne) in patrol (En Patrouille) took place at Étampes-Mondésir Airport. The demonstration was executed by instructors of the Piloting Perfection School, on Morane-Saulnier MS.230. The formation was composed of three aircraft. Between 1932 and 1939, under the command of Captain Pierre Fleurquin, the Patrouille d'Étampes received an encouraging success and entered in posterity. Accordingly, the Patrol was chosen to represent France during international meetings. In 1935, the Patrouille d'Étampes was converted on MS.225 and developed capability to pass to five equipment (1936). In 1937, the unit joined Salon-de-Provence; it was designated Patrouille de l'École de l'Air. The Second World War interrupted different activities.

=== Birth of the Patrouille de France ===
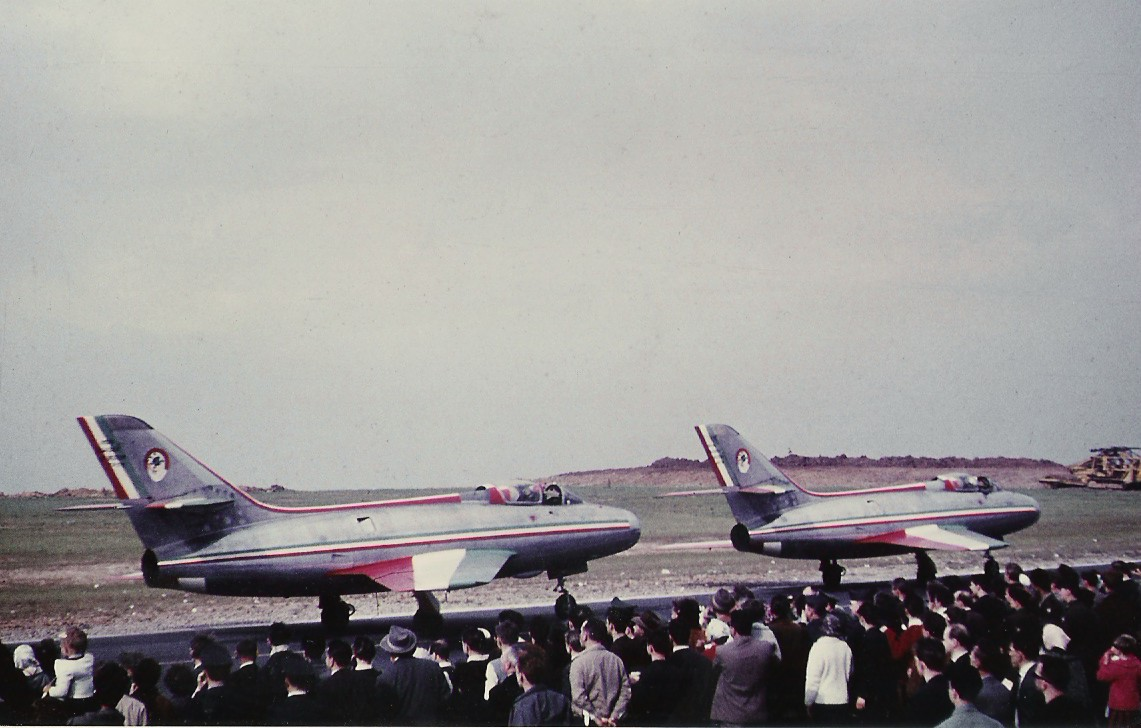
2 Mystère IVA of the Patrouille de France on the American base of Bitburg, in 1960

In 1947, the Minister of Air created an escadrille of representation for the French Air Force. The presentation unit was directed by Capitaine Pierre, former pilot of the Patrouille d'Étampes and accordingly equipped with twelve Stampe SV-4. In front of the ongoing ascending success of presentations, diverse formations were put in place at the corps of the French Air Force. In 1952, Commandant Pierre Delachenal, pilot of the 3^{e} Escadre, stationed at Aerial Base 112 Reims-Champagne, formed an escadrille of four Republic F-84G. During an aerial meeting on 17 May on the field of Maison-Blanche (White House) in Algeria, the pilot show commentator of the escadrille and journalist Jacques Nœtinger, overwhelmingly shocked with the spectacle which he had just witnessed, baptised France's Patrol officially as Patrouille de France. The general staff headquarters of the French Air Force accordingly confirmed this appellation on 14 September 1953.

=== Recent developments ===
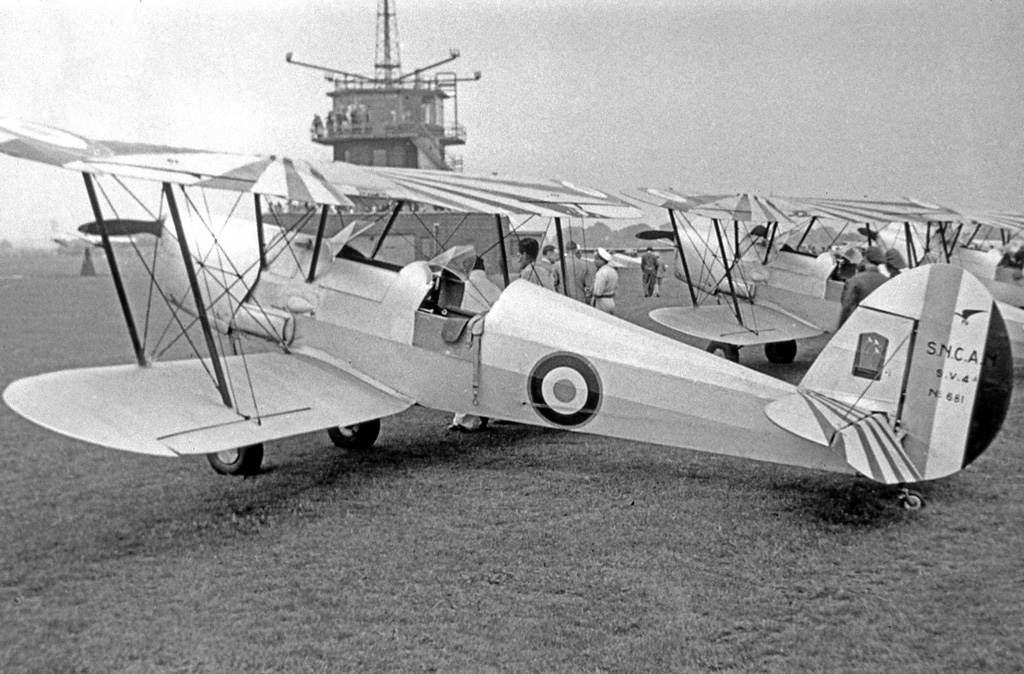
Stampe SV.4C of the Patrouille de France in 1951

During the ten following years, four Escadres of the French Air Force (the 12^{e} Escadre of Aerial Base 103 Cambray-Épinoy, the 4^{e} Escadres of Aerial Base 136 Bremgarten; the 2^{e} Escadre of Aerial Base 102 Dijon-Longvic and the 4^{e} Escadre of Aerial Base 133 Nancy-Ochey) perpetuated one after the other (tour à tour) the traditions of the Patrouille de France and contributed to patrol's international success. Nevertheless, in 1964, following budgetary restrictions, the patrol of Dassault Mystère IV was dissolved. Anxious not to have the designation of Patrouille de France disappear, the Minister of the Armies decided accordingly a couple of months later to adopt the Patrouille de l'École de l'Air.

The six Fouga Magister of the Aerial Base of Salon-de-Provence became the torch of French Aerial Aerobatics (French: Voltige Aérienne Française) during sixteen years. The last presentation of Fouga Magister, which the number was nine, was held on 16 September 1980 at Salon-de-Provence. The Dassault/Dornier Alpha Jet became the steel spear of the Patrouille de France in 1981 with 7 aircraft. This number was increased to 8 as of 1982. A historical display took place in 1986 above New York City. On 25 November 2009, for the first time in the world, an aerobatic team was commanded by a woman, when Commandant of the French Air Force Virginie Guyot became leader of the Patrouille de France.

During the France segment of the 2020 Summer Olympics closing ceremony, the Patrouille de France performed a flyby over Paris, passing the Eiffel Tower as Tokyo passed the Olympics on to the French capital for the 2024 Games.

The Patroulle performed for their 70th anniversary and Kleine Brogel base in Belgium Air Force Days 2023.

== Pilots ==
Three pilots integrate the Patrouille each year. The new pilots are chosen amongst the Fighter Pilots pilots (French: Chasse) of the French Air Force, which come forth voluntarily. They have to retain the qualification of a Flight Lead and have at least 1500 hours of flying on jet aircraft in order to apply.

From the principle of cooperation, the pilots chose the three future pilots of the Patrouille.

The 2009–2010 season was marked by the arrival, for a first time, of a female pilot : Commandant Virginie Guyot.

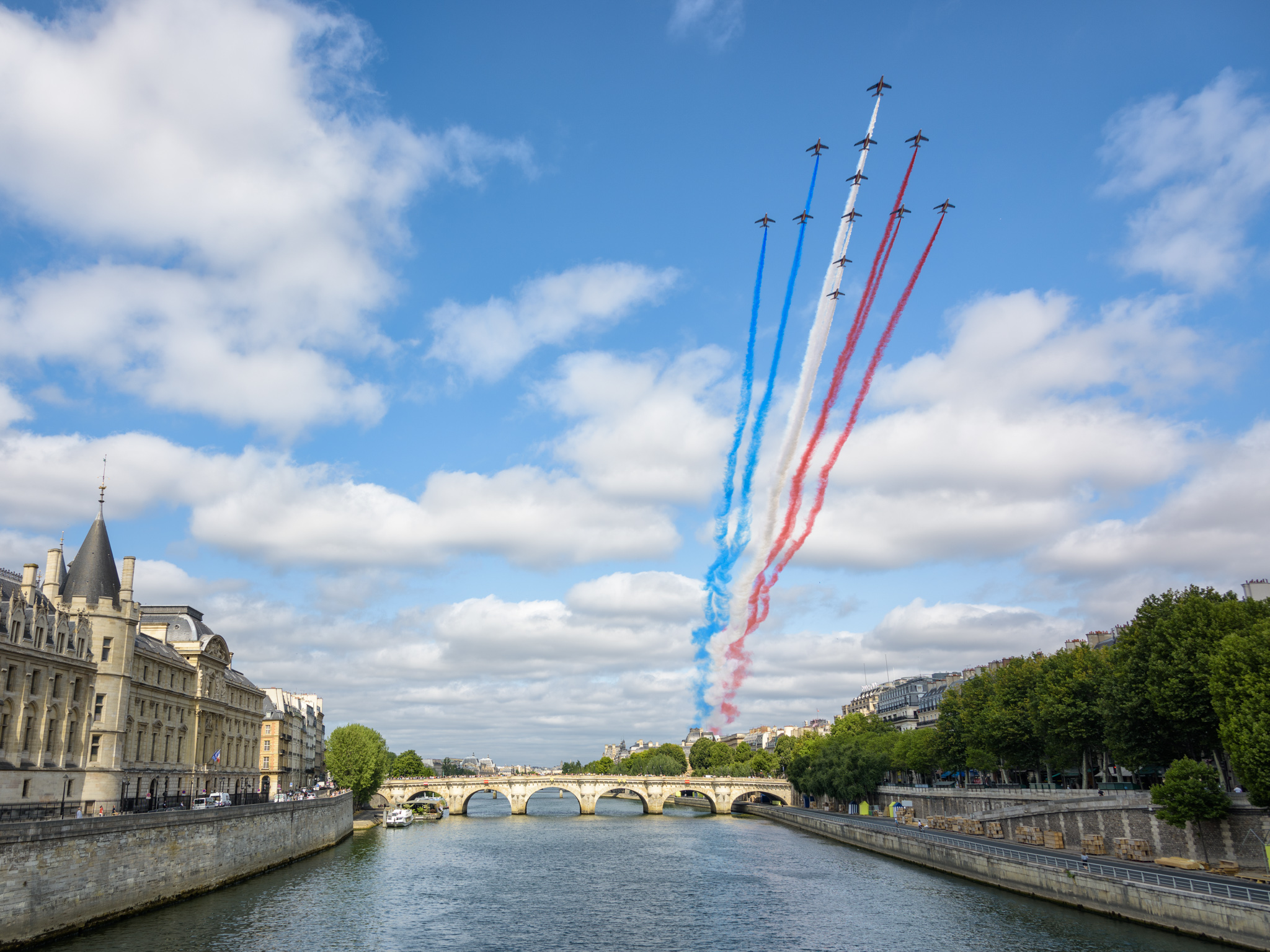
The team forming a Cross of Lorraine and flying over the Conciergerie and Seine, during Bastille Day (2015)

The radio code of the Patrouille is Athos:

- The Leader - Le Leader
  - Athos 1 remains on post for a period of one year, the leader is the only indispensable pilot in the Patrouille and cannot be replaced. Orchestra Chief of the Patrouille, the leader determines with his team the figures and formations which the patrol will form and paint.
- The interiors - Les intérieurs
  - Respectively Athos 2 and Athos 3. They are in their first year in the Patrouille and evolve a side the leader during the manifestations of flight formations.
- The scavenger (French: Charognard)
  - Athos 4, known for the position : placed behind the leader, Athos 4 literally swallows all the smoke and takes the leader's place the following year.
- The solos - Les solos
  - Athos 5 (solo leader) and Athos 6 (second solo) conduct crossings and percussions during the « synchronisation », second part of the program.
- The exteriors - Les extérieurs
  - Athos 7 and Athos 8 are part of the equipment the furthest from the leader. Their respective places at the corps of formations demand from them a great deal of anticipation and concentration in order to hold formation of the aerial fort.
- The replacement - Le remplaçant
  - Athos 9 is the oldest pilot of the Patrouille, since Athos 9 occupied the post of "interior", second of solo and leader solo the previous years. Athos 9 has to be capable in replacing any of the patrollers. He cannot however replace the "leader".

== Mechanics ==
The 'Patrouille de France' is first a team.

They are 32 mechanics to put in place, maintain and repair the 12 Alphajet assigned to the unit.

Placed under the orders of technical services chief, the mechanics are also chosen by cooptation amongst the mechanics of the French Air and Space Force. They are all volunteers and worker often late at night to assure the mission of the following day. They are mainly two teams.

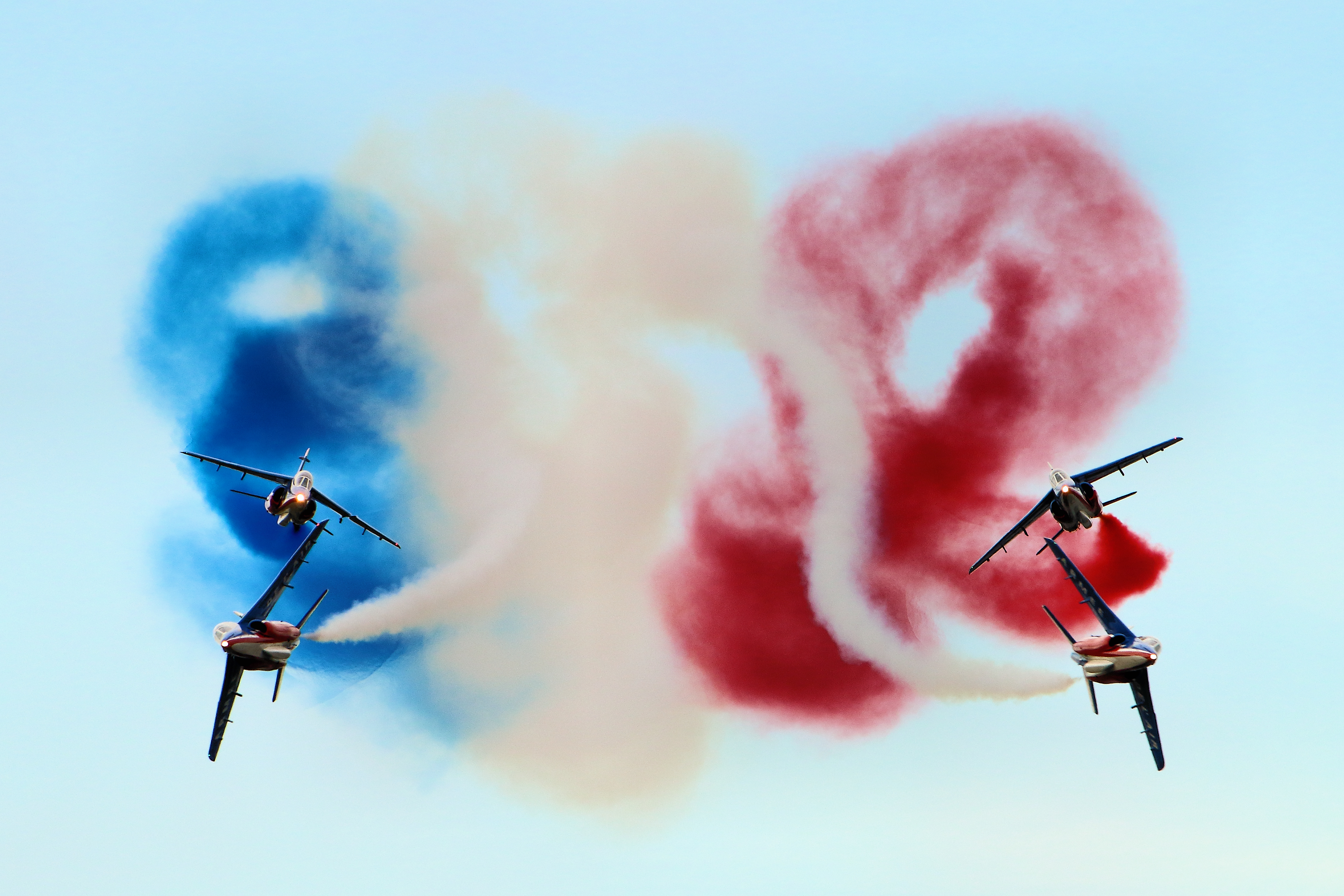
Patrouille painting the French flag

- The Troubleshooting Team

Charged with troubleshooting the necessary immobilization of an aircraft, or the utilization of specific tools, the troubleshooting team guarantees equally the consistency of programmed operations. This team is stationary on an Aerial Base, and ensures the base's back-up support, or when the Patrouille returns from meeting.

- The field/meeting Team

Based on the tradition, the field mechanic chooses the pilot. The mechanic accompanies the pilot during the appropriate season on all "meetings", and navigates in the rear for all transit flights. In a particular uniform, the latter ensures the effect placement of each flight departure and return. The confidence between the mechanic and pilot is absolute/total.

- The Transall Accompaniment

A Transall C-160 accompanies the Patrouille de France to each displacement. The accompaniment revolves around ensuring the necessary logistics support, in transporting a dozen tons of materials, in addition to the required personnel in concern for the mission. The accompaniment is capable of conducting rotations to main base from any lieu in case the situation was of a requirement.

The Transall and crew which participate to the mission of the Patrouille, hail from the transport squadrons of the French Air and Space Force.

== Formations ==
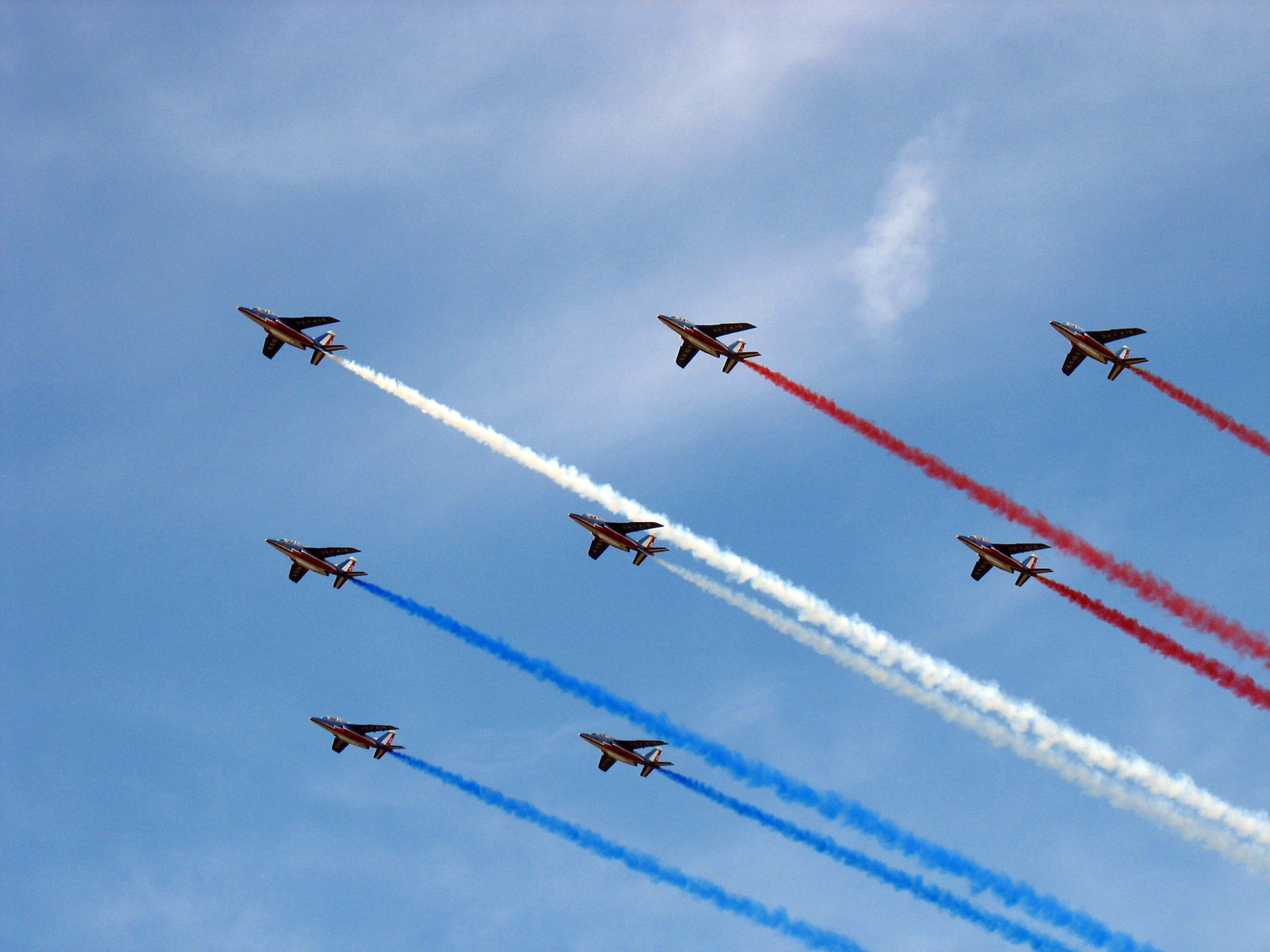
The PAF in diamond formation.

The program of the Patrouille de France is renewed each year. Each program, designated a "series", is determined by the leader in accordance with all members of the team.

This program is proposed to be validated by security flight commission, before being validated, similarly to all demonstration pilots, by the Chief of Staff of the French Air Force during the spring on an Aerial Base.

The series for the year is divided in two parts, the ruban (8 Alphajet evolve in a tight quarter formation and change formation) and the synchro (the Patrouille is divided into two formations and conducts alternatively figures of 2, 4, or 6 aircraft). The chains of maneuvers must be perfectly synchronized between the leader and the leader solo in order to avoid dead time for the public, and avoid equally the superposition of two figures.

The emblematic figure of the Patrouille is the heart (balance in Y at 6 cut by an arrow realized by the two solos).

The pilots fly at speeds between 300 and 800 km/h, while being only spaced from each other by 2 or 3 meters.

The base formation of the Patrouille de France is the "Diamant" ('Diamond'); however, the repertoire includes numerous other formations, and can be orchestrated into a series. The repertoire of the Patrouille de France consists of at least 20 different formations.

== Aircraft ==
- Republic F-84 G Thunderjet (1953–1954)
- Dassault Ouragan (1954–1957)
- Dassault Mystère IV (1957–1964)
- Fouga Magister (1964–1981)
- Dassault-Breguet/Dornier Alpha Jet (since 1981)

Each aircraft is painted blue-white-red, with the gun placement replaced with a smoke generator. Search lights are installed on the aircraft nose, and the viewfinder has been removed to improve visibility.

== Accidents ==
- 1935 – Death of Chief Warrant Officer (French: Adjudant-Chef) Carlier following an accident.
- 1967 – At the egress of the final usual burst (French: éclatement), the Fouga Magister of Captain Didier Duthoit, commandant in second of the PAF, crashed in the proximity of a grandstand. The pilot was killed.
- 1980 – Two Fougas collided while executing a synchronized maneuver. The two pilots were killed.
- 1981 – An Alpha Jet piloted by the commandant crashed in the north of Aix-en-Provence. The pilot did not eject and was killed.
- 1982 – An Athos 8 crashed during a rehearsal at Salon-de-Provence Air Base. The pilot was killed.
- 1983 – Two aircraft collided in mid-air while conducting a maneuver over Niort. The aircraft were part of two groups of four aircraft each, practising a 4 vs 4 crossover. Of the two pilots, one, Lieutenant Vuillamy, was killed, while the other survived.
- 1987 – The two solos collided during a meeting at Annemasse. Neither pilot was injured.
- 1991 – The two solos collided. One pilot was killed, while the other ejected and sustained injuries.
- 1992 – The second solo crashed during a training flight at Salon-de-Provence Air Base. The pilot narrowly avoided a highway, activated the ejection seat too late and was killed.
- 1993 – During a training flight, one of the Alpha Jet solos crashed near Cameri Air Base in Italy. The two pilots ejected and sustained injuries.
- 2002 – While returning to Salon-de-Provence Air Base after a training mission, an Alpha Jet crashed on a turn before landing. The pilot, Captain Daniel Marchand, attempted to eject too late, and was killed.
- 2010 – While conducting a solo maneuver during a training mission, one of the solo Alpha Jets crashed near the Orange Plan de Dieu Airport (fr) near Orange, Vaucluse. The pilot, Captain Sylvain Courtot, ejected 10 meters from the ground and landed meters from the crashed aircraft. He suffered from fractures and retook flights in 2011. The "replacement" 2009 made his come back in the Patrouille to perform the 2010 season.
- 2019 – On 25 July, an Alpha Jet overran the runway at Perpignan Airport. The pilot ejected.
- 2025 – On 25 March, two of the team's Dassault/Dornier Alpha Jets collided during a rehearsal of a six-aircraft display maneuver near an air base in Saint-Dizier. Both pilots and a passenger ejected, with one of them sustaining multiple injuries.

== Patron ==
The Patrouille de France (PAF) has many encounters with notable figures, but few have been awarded the official title of "Patron/Godfather or Godmother" (French: parrain - marraine) (Patron can designate a Godfather "parrain" or Godmother "marraine"). For example, Nicolas Hulot, victim of a "voile noir" on board of a Patrouille de France aircraft, was never awarded the title.

The first Patron/Godfather of the Patrouille de France was Alain Delon, in 1988. He came for the first time to Salon-de-Provence Air Base, with Yves Mourousi, then flew on a flight directly to Journal de 13 heures of TF1, a journey which took 30 minutes. His "renommée" (designation) generated much conversation about the French Air Force and reinforced the relation between the French Air Force and France. The pilots at the time were Commandant Velluz (leader), Lieutenant (☨)Bossert, Lieutenant Girbe, Captain Hendel, Captain Weber, Lieutenant Mougel, Captain Bonin, Lieutenant Manzo and Captain Bro.

In 1990, Michel Drucker accepted to be the Godfather/Patron of the Patrouille de France. A journalist with a passion for aeronautics, he came for the first time to the Salon-de-Provence Air Base on 26 March 1990, and took his first flight on 26 April. Two days later, the display team appeared on the TV program Champs-Élysées (French: Champs-Élysées (émission de télévision)). The appearance allowed the audience to observe French Air Force personnel behind-the-scenes. In 2010, at the 20th anniversary of the Patrouille de France, the team appeared on the TV program Vivement Dimanche (French: Vivement dimanche) for a special program. The pilots were Commandant (☨)Festas, Lieutenant Chantereau, Captain (☨)Lenne, Captain Barou, Lieutenant Girbe, Lieutenant Lagrange, Captain (☨)Bossert, Captain Louis and Lieutenant Manzo.

In 1991, the Patrouille de France chose Jean-Claude Killy, triple Olympic champion at the 1968 Winter Olympics held in Grenoble. Killy was the co-organizer of the 1992 Winter Olympics held in Albertville, where the PAF performed. The pilots were Commandant Barou, Captain Reyre, Captain Manzo, Captain (☨)Bossert, Captain Girbe, Captain Lagrange, Captain Chantereau, Captain Pittie and Lieutenant Gourhan.

In 1993, on the 40th anniversary of the formation of the PAF, Albert II, Prince of Monaco became the Godfather/Patron. The pilots were Commandant Connan, Captain Kurtz, Captain Manzo, Captain Laloix, Captain Gourhan, Captain Chicha, Captain Huillier and Lieutenant Perret.

In 2001, the Judo champion David Douillet became Godfather/Patron. Douillet conducted a flight in front of the Patrouille de France on board the Transall transport aircraft with the door open. The pilots were Commandant Giraud, Commandant Girard, Captain Mateo, Captain Boillot, Captain Boulay, Captain Talichet, Captain Fricker, Captain Lespade and Captain Espinet.

In 2010, Carla Bruni, wife of the President of France Nicolas Sarkozy, became the first Patron/Godmother. The pilots were Commandant Guyot, Commandant Tranchon, Captain Guy, Captaine Hauser, Captain Castaing, Captain Wallaert, Captain Pillet, Captain Courtot, Captain Monhée and Captain Bourgeon.

In 2012, the rugby player Thierry Dusautoir became the Patron/Godfather for the running year. The pilots were Commandant Gauthier Dewas, Captain Vincent Plantier, Captain William Leroy, Commandant Raphaël Nal, Captain Jean-Noël Guy, Captain Guillaume Smets, Captain Antoine Hauser, Captain Philippe Castagnet, Captain Sylvain Pillet.

In 2014, the French Air Force celebrated its 80th anniversary and for the first time in history, the Patrouille de France counted two Patrons: Jean-Loup Chrétien and Patrick Baudry, who conducted two flights during the year. The 2014 team composed of Commandant Herpin, Commandant Béthoux, Captain Michel, Captain Chanat, Captain Plantier, Captain Blanc-Tailleur, Captain Leroy, Captain Aubert and Captain Castagnet.

== See also ==
- Major (France)
- Chief of Staff of the French Air Force
- List of French Air and Space Force aircraft squadrons
- List of Escadres of the French Air Force
- Escadrille Lafayette

== Bibliography ==
- Bénichou, Michel (October 1993). "Le première patrouille de demonstration de l'Armée de l'Air" [The First Demonstration Unit of the French Air Force]. Le Fana de l'Aviation (in French) (287): 56–61. ISSN 0757-4169.
- Krausener, Jean-Marie (August 2003). "50 ans de panache pour la patrouille de France" [50 Years of Panache from the Patrouille de France]. Avions: Toute l'aéronautique et son histoire (in French) (125): 6–23. ISSN 1243-8650.
- Lela Presse, 60 ans de la Patrouille de France en images, Avions Hors-série n°35, Sébastien Guillemin, Jean-Louis Gaynecoetche & Humbert Charve, 2013, pages 100
- EPA, La Patrouille de France, Vincent Perrot, 2009, pages 184, ISBN 9782851206886,
- Petit, Jean-Jacques (December 1978). "Histoire de la Patrouille de France" [History of the Patrouille de France]. Le Fana de l'Aviation (in French) (109): 24–29. ISSN 0757-4169.
- Rocher, Alexis, ed. (May 2023). "Les 70 ans de la Patrouille de France: L'âge d'or des "Mystère" IV supersoniques; première partie" [70 Years of the Patrouille de France: The Golden Age of the Supersonic Mystere IV, Part 1]. Le Fana de l'Aviation (in French) (642): 18–30. ISSN 0757-4169.
