= Monceau =

Monceau may refer to:

== Places ==
- Monceau, a former village now part of the 17th arrondissement of Paris, one of the 20 arrondissements of Paris, the capital city of France
  - Parc Monceau, a park in the 17th arrondissement of Paris, named after the former
  - Monceau station, a station on Paris Metro Line 2
- Chevresis-Monceau, a commune in the Aisne department in Hauts-de-France in northern France
- Monceau Castle (disambiguation)
- Monceau-le-Neuf-et-Faucouzy, a commune in the Aisne department of France
- Monceau-lès-Leups, a commune in the Aisne department of France
- Monceau-le-Waast, a commune in the Aisne department of France
- Monceau-Saint-Waast, a commune in the Nord department in northern France
- Monceau-sur-Oise, a commune in the Aisne department of France
- Monceau-sur-Sambre, a town of Wallonia, Belgium

== People ==
- Henri-Louis Duhamel du Monceau (1700-1782), French physician, naval engineer, and botanist
- Hervé du Monceau de Bergendael (1910-1977), Belgian fencer
- Yves du Monceau de Bergendal (1915-1984), Belgian aviator

== Others ==
- 100231 Monceau, a minor planet
