= List of World War II aces from Belgium =

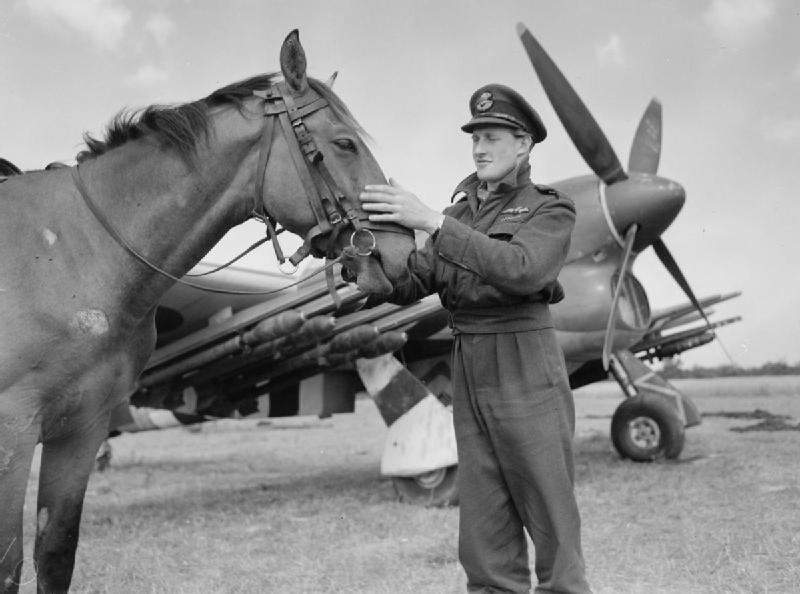
Raymond "Cheval" Lallemant, pictured in July 1944

This is a list of fighter aces in World War II from Belgium. For other countries, see: List of World War II aces by country.

== B ==
Name	Kills	Awards	Notes
Balasse, Maurice Arthur Leon	8		KIA 23 January 1945
Boussa, Lucien Adolphe	7		

== D ==
Name	Kills	Awards	Notes
Detal, Charles Firmin Joseph	7		KIA 23 March 1944

== H ==
Name	Kills	Awards	Notes
de Hemricourt de Grunne, Rodolphe Ghislain Charles			♣ KIA 25 May 1941

== L ==
Name	Kills	Awards	Notes
Lallemant, Raymond/Ramond A "Cheval"	6	DFC & bar	
Le Roy du Vivier, Daniel Albert Raymond	5		♣
Van Lierde, Remi/Remy "Manu" "Mony"	50 (6 aircraft, 44 V1's)	DFC & 2 bars	

== M ==
Name	Kills	Awards	Notes
de Moulin, Charles Joseph V G	5		
du Monceau de Bergendal, Yvan	8		

== O ==
Name	Kills	Awards	Notes
Offenberg, Jean Henri Marie "Pyker"	7	DFC	♣ KIA 22 January 1942
Ortmanns, Victor Marcel M "Vicky"	7		♣ POW 1941, KIFA 8 August 1950

== P ==
Name	Kills	Awards	Notes
Philippart, Jacques Arthur Laurent	6		♣ KIA 25 August 1940
Plisnier, André Marie Alfred "Plis"	6		

== V ==
Name	Kills	Awards	Notes
Venesoen, François Auguste "Sus"	5	DFC	♣ KIA 6 June 1944
