= Florennes Air Base =

Militarty air base in Wallonia

Florennes Air Base
- Base aérienne de Florennes
- Base Jean Offenberg, 5620 Florennes, Wallonia in Belgium
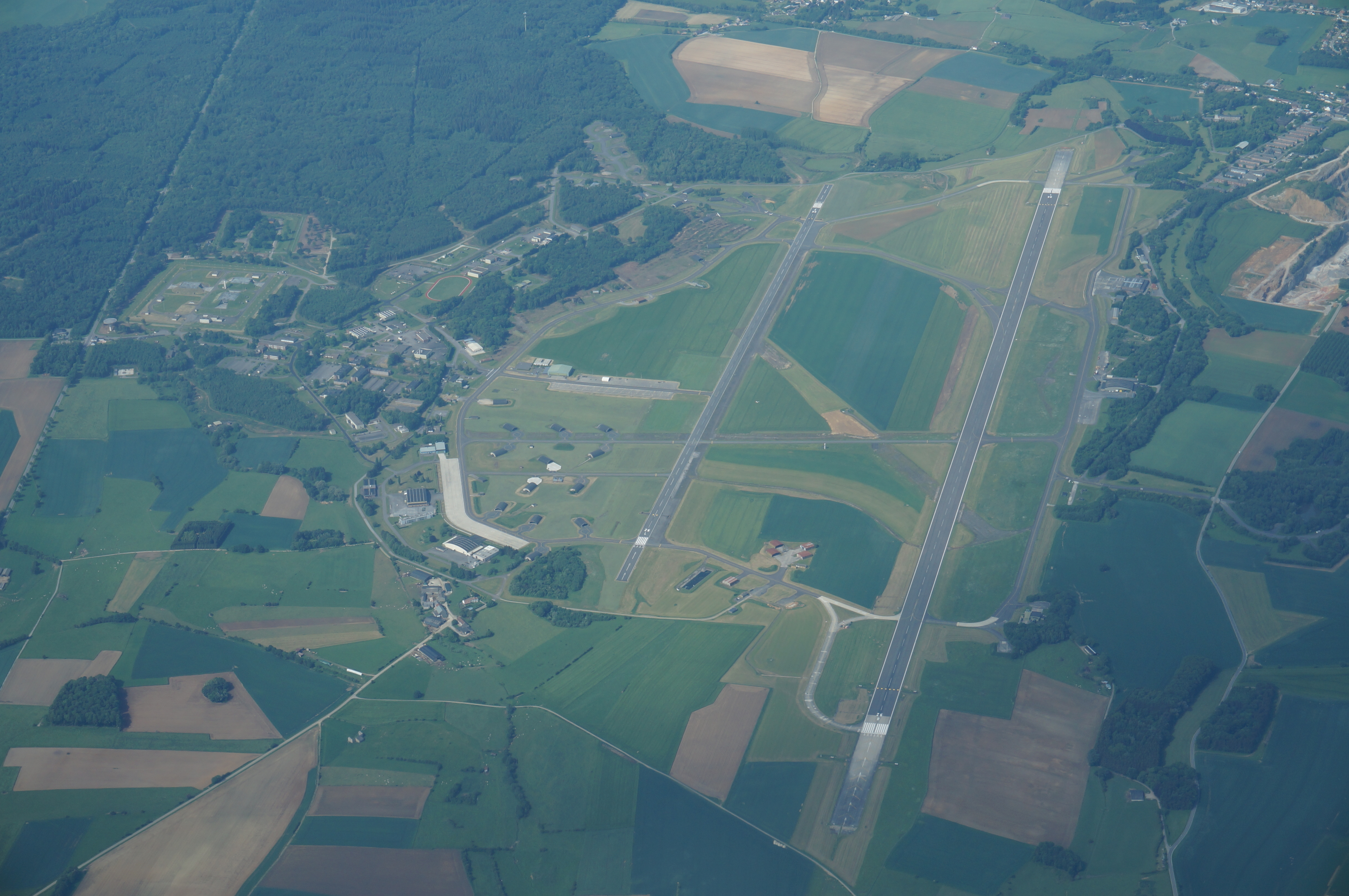
- aerial photo of Florennes Air Base, 2018

Site information
- Type: Military airbase
- Owner: (Belgium) Ministry of Defence
- Operator: Belgian Air Component
- Condition: operational

Location
- Location in Belgium
- Coordinates: 50°14′36″N 004°38′45″E

Site history
- Built: 1936; 90 years ago

Garrison information
- Current commander: Colonel Cedric Kamensky
- Garrison: 2nd Tactical Wing

Airfield information
- Identifiers: ICAO: EBFS
- Elevation: 927 feet (283 m) AMSL
Runways
Direction	Length and surface
08L/26R	3,388 m × 45 m (11,115 ft × 148 ft) asphalt concrete
08R/26L	2,248 m × 22.5 m (7,375 ft × 74 ft) asphalt concrete

Florennes Air Base (French: Base aérienne de Florennes), also known as Base Jean Offenberg, (ICAO: EBFS) is a Belgian Air Force military airbase, compliant to STANAG 3712 category 8 (and category 5 during quick reaction alert operations), located 4 km (2 miles) east‑southeast of Florennes, in Wallonia, Belgium. It is home to the 2nd Tactical Wing, operating two squadrons of the General Dynamics F-16, with 1st Squadron transitioning to the F-35A Lightning II in 2025–26. The Tactical Leadership Programme (TLP), a joint training programme for NATO members, was based at Florennes from 1989 to 2009.

== History ==
In May 1940, during World War II, German Wehrmacht troops conquered the Netherlands, Belgium and Luxembourg (first part of the Western Campaign). Belgium became part of the Reichskommissariat of Belgium and Northern France. Luftwaffe fighter units operated from Florennes, including Junkers Ju 88 and Messerschmitt Bf 110 night fighters, and Focke-Wulf Fw 190 day fighters. It was recaptured in September 1944 and became known as Advanced Landing Ground (ALG) A-78, after which Western Allied units operating from here included the United States Air Force (USAF) 430th Fighter Squadron, flying Lockheed Lockheed P-38 Lightnings in the ground attack role, and the United States Army Air Forces (USAAF) 422nd Night Fighter Squadron, flying Northrop P-61 Black Widows. From 1984 to 1990, the USAF 485th Tactical Missile Wing was located at Florennes, deploying the BGM-109G Ground Launched Cruise Missile system, which were removed in 1989 as part of the Intermediate-Range Nuclear Forces Treaty.

In March 1989, the Tactical Leadership Programme (TLP) moved to Florennes. The TLP is a joint training programme, originally formed in 1978 by defence members from six NATO countries at Fürstenfeldbruck near Munich in West Germany, and previously based at Jever from 1979. By the time TLP arrived at Florennes, it consisted of NATO members from ten countries. Whilst at Florennes, the TLP conducted multilateral military flying training courses, and expanded to include creating formalised documentation for NATO doctrines, along with other academic studies relating to allied air forces. On 31 July 2009, TLP moved to Albacete in Spain.

== Current units ==
Florennes Air Base is home to four squadrons:

1 Squadron, which was formed in 1917, operating F-16's and designated as the first Belgian unit to operate the F-35A (first 4 were delivered in 2025).

2 Squadron, reactivated in 2023 to operate the MQ-9B SkyGuardian (2 systems with 2 drones per system ordered, the first system was delivered in 2025).

10 Squadron, reactivated in January 2025 as the first F-35 Operations Support Squadron.

350 Squadron, founded in the United Kingdom in 1942 during the Second World War, operating F-16's.

It is also home to the Belgian Defence Aeroclub ASBL.

== Notable incidents ==
On 11 October 2018, a Belgian Air Force F-16AM (registration FA-128) costing €40 million was destroyed by fire at the airbase. During routine maintenance on three nearby F-16s, a technician working on one F-16 accidentally fired its Vulcan M61A1 cannon, the discharged rounds penetrating the fuel tanks of a nearby F-16AM, which had just been fuelled for a training mission, this exploded in a fireball which totally destroyed that aircraft. The explosion also caused collateral damage to two other F-16 aircraft, including the one which discharged its cannon. Two technicians sustained injuries, including hearing loss, and required treatment in hospital.

== See also ==
- Transportation in Belgium
