= 350th Squadron (Belgium) =

No. 350 (Belgian) Squadron RAF 350th Squadron
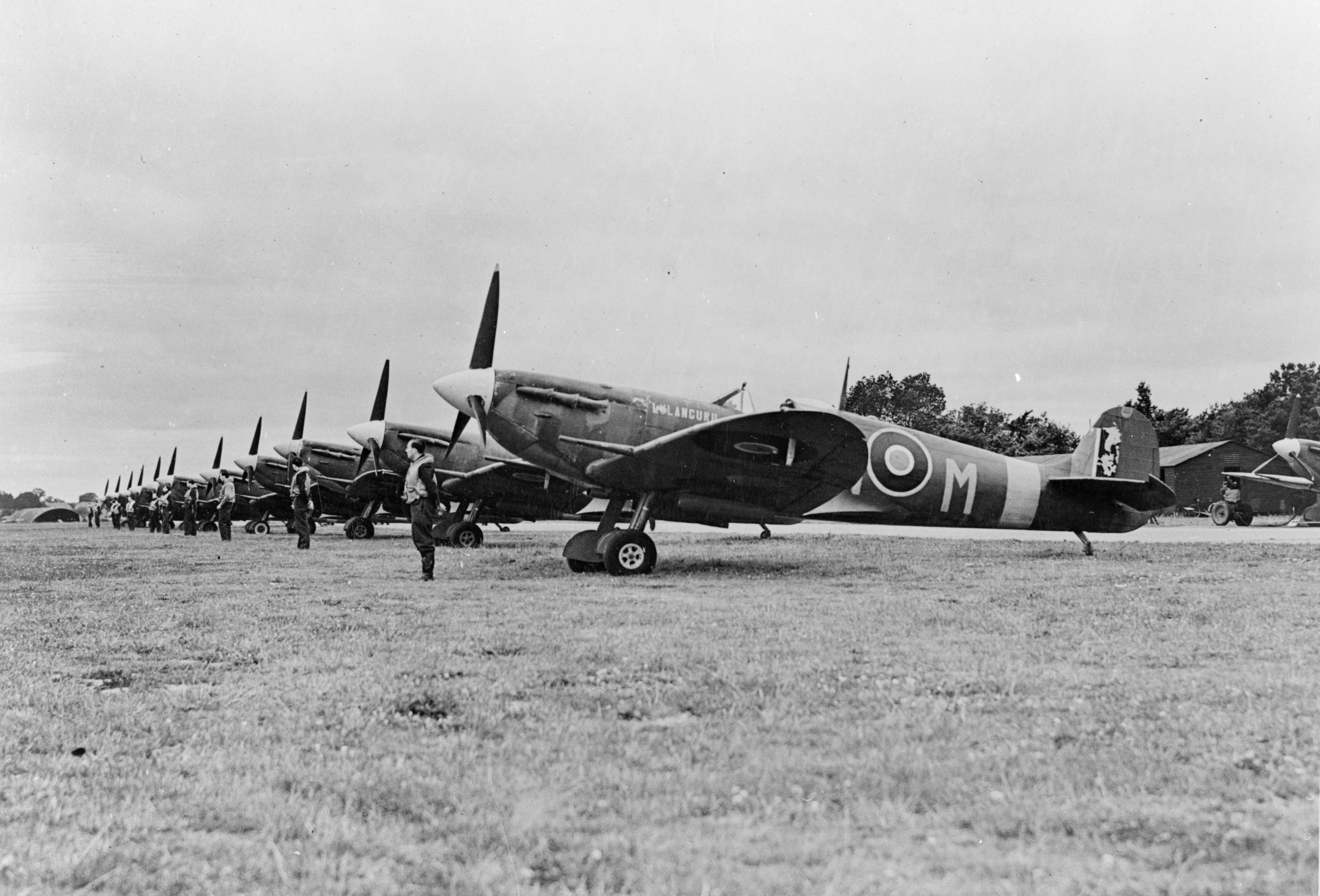
- Spitfires of No. 350 (Belgian) Squadron at RAF Kenley, 1942.
- Active: 12 November 1941
- Country: Belgium
- Branch: Belgian Air Force; Royal Air Force (1941–1946)
- Role: Fighter
- Part of: 2nd Tactical Wing
- Garrison/HQ: Florennes Air Base
- Mottos: Belgae gallorum fortissimi (Note: The motto is an adaptation of a quote from Julius Caesar's Commentarii de Bello Gallico 1.1 where the Belgae are described as the bravest of all the Gauls which the Roman army faced during the Gallic War.) (Latin, "Of all the Gauls, the Belgians are the bravest")
- Fighter: F-16 Fighting Falcon; Supermarine Spitfire (historic)

Insignia
- Squadron Badge: An ancient Belgian warrior's head with helmet
- Squadron Codes: MN (Nov 1941 – Oct 1946)

The 350th Squadron (French: 350^{e} escadrille, Dutch: 350^{ste} Squadron) is a fighter squadron in the Belgian Air Force of the Belgian Armed Forces. It was originally formed in 1941 as No. 350 (Belgian) Smaldeel of the Royal Air Force during World War II. The unit was transferred to the Belgian Air Force, together with 349th Squadron, in 1946. Based at Florennes air base, the unit is now part of the 2nd Tactical Wing and operates F-16 Fighting Falcons.

== History ==
=== With the Royal Air Force ===
No. 350 Squadron, the first Royal Air Force squadron to be formed by Belgian personnel, was formed during World War II at RAF Valley in the United Kingdom in November 1941. The squadron operated the Supermarine Spitfire at first on convoy protection duties over the Irish Sea, relocating to RAF Atcham in early 1942. In April 1942 the squadron moved to RAF Debden and carried out offensive operations over France. The squadron moved several times around southern England.

During Operation Overlord (the Allied invasion of Normandy in June 1944) it was equipped with the Spitfire V LF operating from RAF Friston in Air Defence of Great Britain, though under the operational control of RAF Second Tactical Air Force. It provided beach-head patrols during the invasion. During Operation Diver in August 1944 the Squadron operated the Spitfire XIV against V-1 flying bombs attacking England. The squadron moved to Belgium in December 1944 to provide offensive patrols over the battlefield including patrols in the Berlin area. The squadron was disbanded on 15 October 1946 on transfer to the Belgian air force.

==== Aircraft operated during RAF service ====
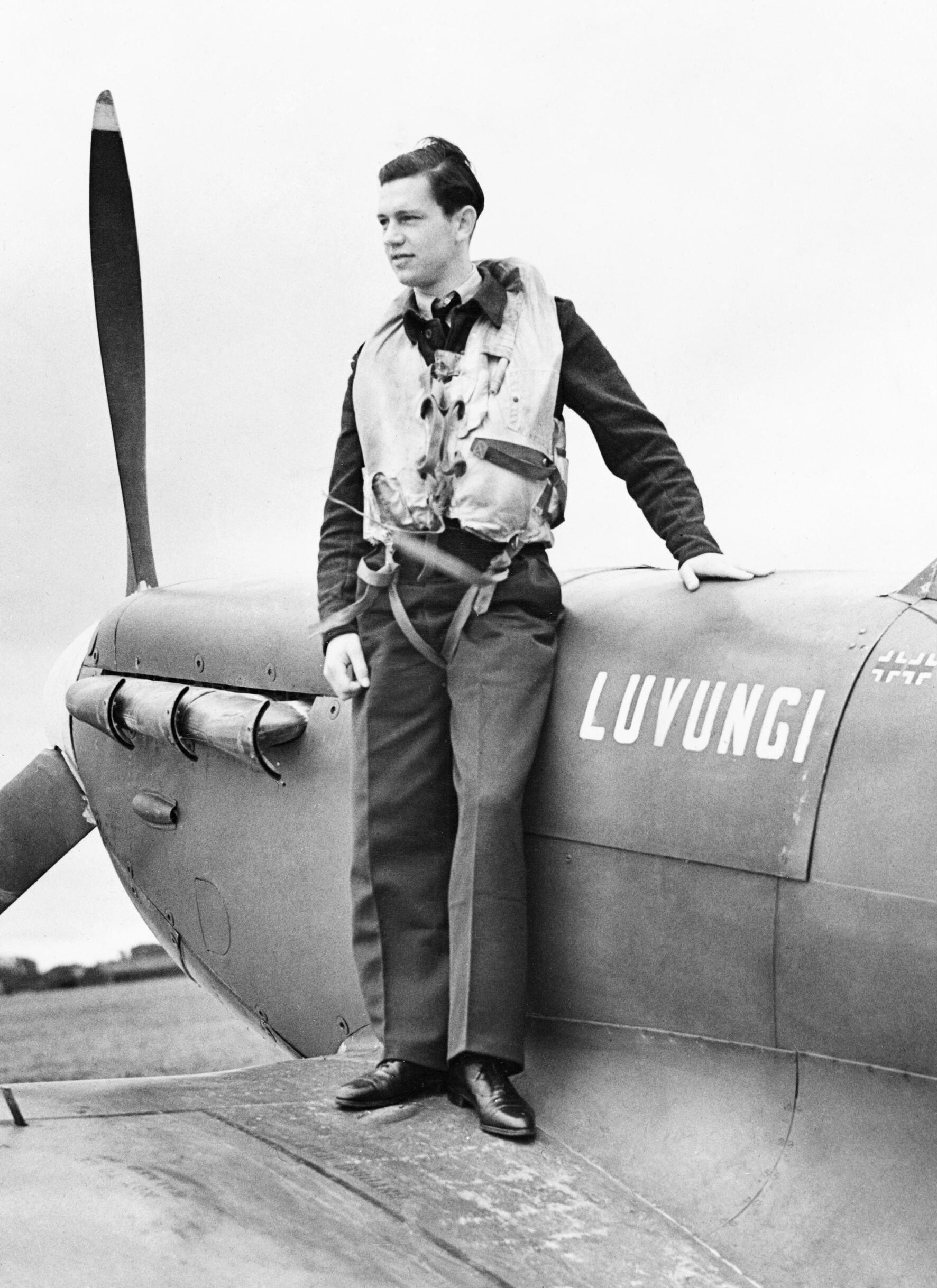
Belgian pilot lieutenant Henri A. Picard of No. 350 Squadron on the wing of his Spitfire at RAF Kenley, July 1942. Luvungi was a town in the Belgian Congo and site of a skirmish during World War I.

From	To	Aircraft	Variant	Notes
Nov 1941	Apr 1942	Supermarine Spitfire	Mk.II	
Feb 1942	Dec 1943	Supermarine Spitfire	Mk.Vb	
Dec 1943	Mar 1944	Supermarine Spitfire	Mk.IX	
Mar 1944	Jul 1944	Supermarine Spitfire	Mk.Vb, Vc	
Jul 1944	Aug 1944	Supermarine Spitfire	Mk.IX	
Aug 1944	Oct 1946	Supermarine Spitfire	Mk.XIV	
Apr 1946	Oct 1946	Supermarine Spitfire	LF.XVIe	

==== Commanding officers ====
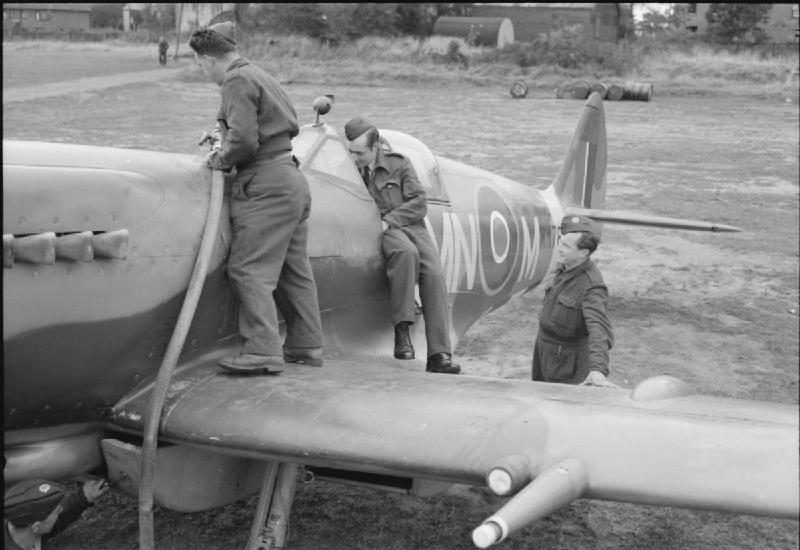
Spitfires of No. 350 Squadron being refueled at RAF Lympne.

From	To	Name
Nov 1941	Mar 1942	S/Ldr. J.M. Thompson, DFC
Mar 1942	Dec 1942	S/Ldr. D.A. Guillaume, DFC
Dec 1942	Jan 1944	S/Ldr. A.L.T.J. Boussa
Jan 1944	Mar 1944	S/Ldr. L.O. Prevot
Mar 1944	Oct 1944	S/Ldr. M.G.L. Donnet, DFC
Oct 1944	Jan 1945	S/Ldr. L. Collignon
Jan 1945	Feb 1945	S/Ldr. T. Spencer, DFC
Mar 1945	Apr 1945	S/Ldr. F. Wooley, DFC
Apr 1945	Apr 1945	S/Ldr. T. Spencer, DFC
Apr 1945	Aug 1945	S/Ldr. H. Walmsley
Aug 1945	Oct 1946	S/Ldr. R. Van Lierde, DFC & 2 Bars

=== Under Belgian command ===
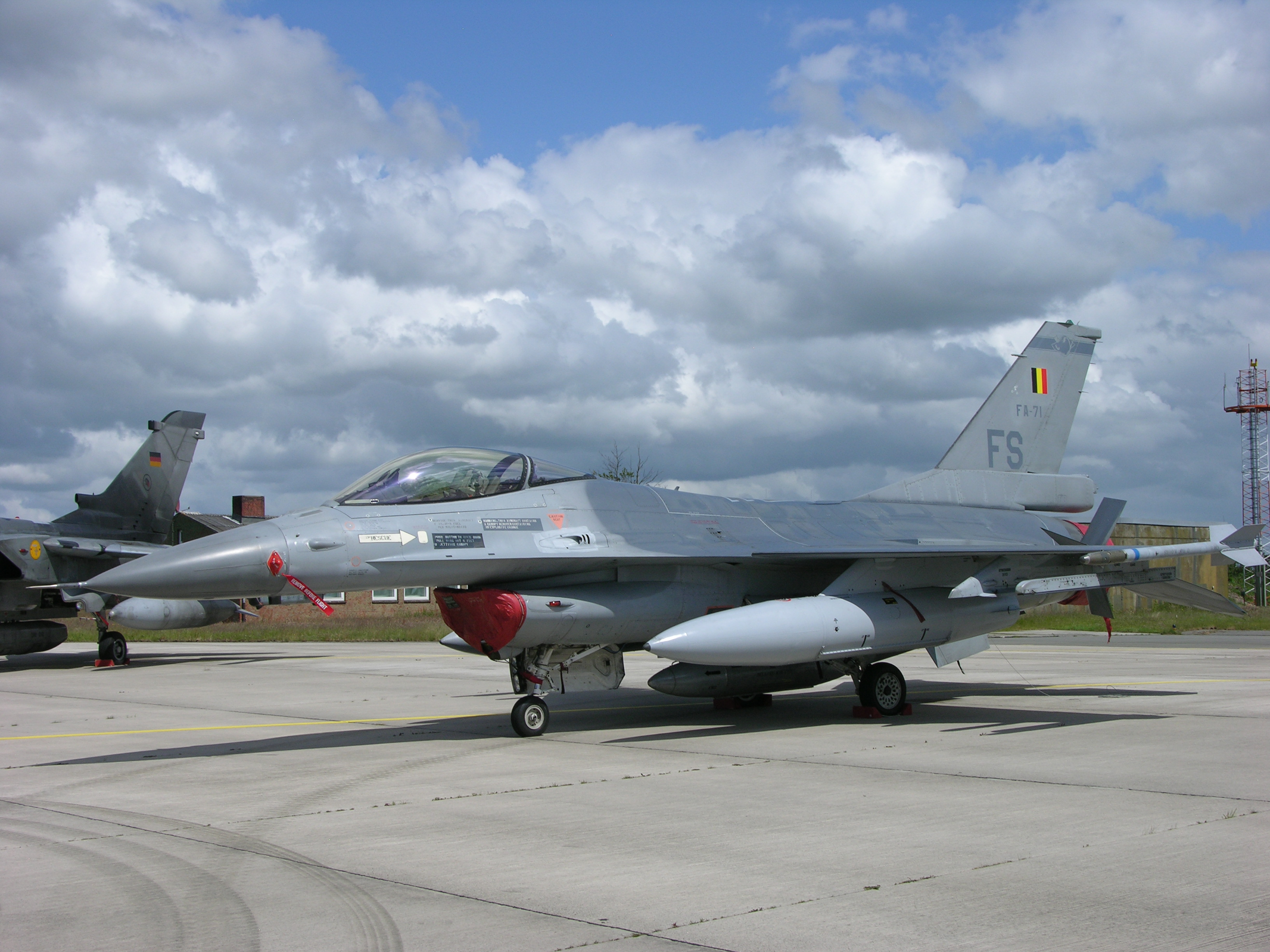
F-16AM of 350th Squadron at Florennes, 2009.

In 1946, the squadron was integrated into the Belgian Air Force.

In July 1949, the squadron received its first jet aircraft, the Gloster Meteor mk. 4 and 8. In 1954, they were replaced by Hawker Hunter mk 4s. In 1958, they received the Avro Canada CF-100 Canuck. In August 1964, the unit was given F-104G Starfighters, taking on the role of Quick Reaction Alert (QRA) with 349th Squadron.

In 1981, the Starfighters were finally replaced with F-16s, becoming operational with the type in January 1982.

In March 1996, 1st Fighter Wing was dissolved and the squadron left Beauvechain to join 2nd Tactical Wing in Florennes.

In 1999, the unit participated in Operation Allied Force: the NATO bombing of Yugoslavia.

== Bibliography ==
- Delve, Ken. D-Day: The Air Battle, London: Arms & Armour Press, 1994, ISBN 1-85409-227-8.
- Donnet, Mike and Leon Branders. Ils en étaient! Les Escadrilles Belges de la RAF. Brussels, Belgium: Pierre De Meyere, Editeur, 1979.
- Halley, James J. The Squadrons of the Royal Air Force & Commonwealth, 1918–1988. Tonbridge, Kent, UK: Air-Britain (Historians) Ltd., 1988. ISBN 0-85130-164-9.
- Jefford, C.G. RAF Squadrons, a Comprehensive Record of the Movement and Equipment of all RAF Squadrons and their Antecedents since 1912. Shrewsbury, Shropshire, UK: Airlife Publishing, 2001. ISBN 1-84037-141-2.
- Lallemant, Lt. Colonel R.A. Rendez-vous avec la chance (in French). Paris: Robert Laffont, 1962.
- Rawlings, John D.R. Fighter Squadrons of the RAF and their Aircraft. London: Macdonald and Jane's (Publishers) Ltd., 1969 (new revised edition 1976, reprinted 1978). ISBN 0-354-01028-X.
- de Vink, Hervé J. (March 1980). "Roi des chasseurs, le "Spitfire" (18): Les Belges et le "Spitfire", un mélange explosif..." [The King of Fighters, the Spitfire, Part 18: The Belgians and the Spitfire, an Explosive Mixture...]. Le Fana de l'Aviation (in French) (124): 10–15. ISSN 0757-4169.
