= Van Lierde =

Van Lierde is a surname. Notable people with the surname include:

- Luc Van Lierde (born 1969), Belgian triathlete
- Petrus Canisius van Lierde (1907–1995), Dutch Roman Catholic priest and theologian
- Remy Van Lierde (1915–1990), Belgian World War II flying ace

== See also ==
- 9859 Van Lierde, main-belt asteroid
