= Raymond Lallemant =

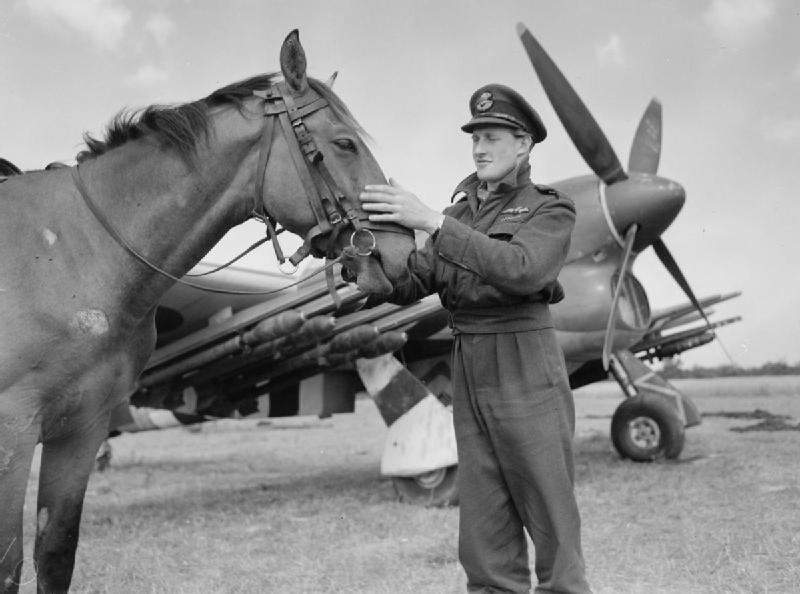
- Lallemant pictured with a horse in front of his Typhoon fighter-bomber in July 1944
- Born: 23 August 1919
- Died: 30 January 2008 (aged 88)
- Military career
- Allegiance: Belgium; United Kingdom
- Branch: Belgian Army (1939–40); Royal Air Force (1940–46); Belgian Air Force (1946–72)
- Service years: 1939–1972
- Rank: Colonel
- Nickname: "Cheval"
- Commands: No. 161 Wing RAF; No. 349 (Belgian) Squadron; No. 609 Squadron
- Conflicts: Second World War
- Awards: Commander of the Order of the Crown; Distinguished Flying Cross & Bar (United Kingdom); Officer of the Legion of Honour (France); Croix de Guerre (France)

Colonel Raymond A. "Cheval" Lallemant, DFC & Bar (23 August 1919 – 30 January 2008) was a Belgian military pilot and flying ace who served in the British Royal Air Force (RAF) during the Second World War. He was credited with destroying six aircraft, making him one of the highest scoring Belgian aces of the conflict. Lallemant, who was nicknamed "Cheval" ("horse" in French), flew Hawker Typhoons with Nos. 609 and 198 Squadrons on ground attack operations. Promoted to squadron leader and appointed commanding officer of No. 609 Squadron in late 1944, Lallemant was shot down over the Netherlands in September 1944 but survived despite his injuries. He was awarded the Distinguished Flying Cross (DFC) and Bar.

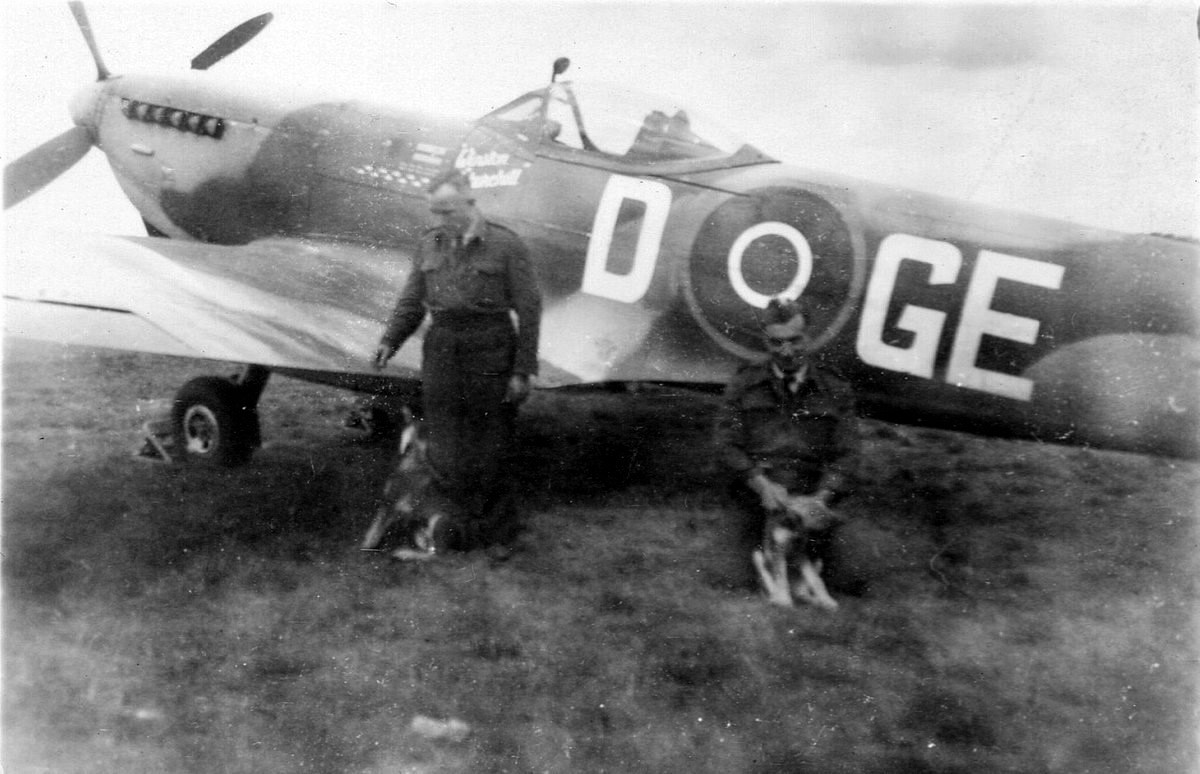
Supermarine Spitfire Mk.XVI TB900/GE-D "Winston Churchill", Lallemant's personal aircraft during his time as No. 349 (Belgian) Squadron's commanding officer.

In March 1945, "Cheval" Lallemant became the commanding officer of No. 349 (Belgian) Squadron, where he flew the Supermarine Spitfire Mk.XVI. The well known Spitfire "Winston Churchill", squadron indicator GE-D, was his personal aircraft until he left No. 349 (Belgian) Squadron in December 1945.

== See also ==
- Remy Van Lierde

== Bibliography ==
- Lallemant, R.A. Rendez-vous avec la chance (in French). Paris: Robert Laffont, 1962.
