= 2015 Los Llanos Air Base crash =

Fighter jet crash in Albacete, Spain

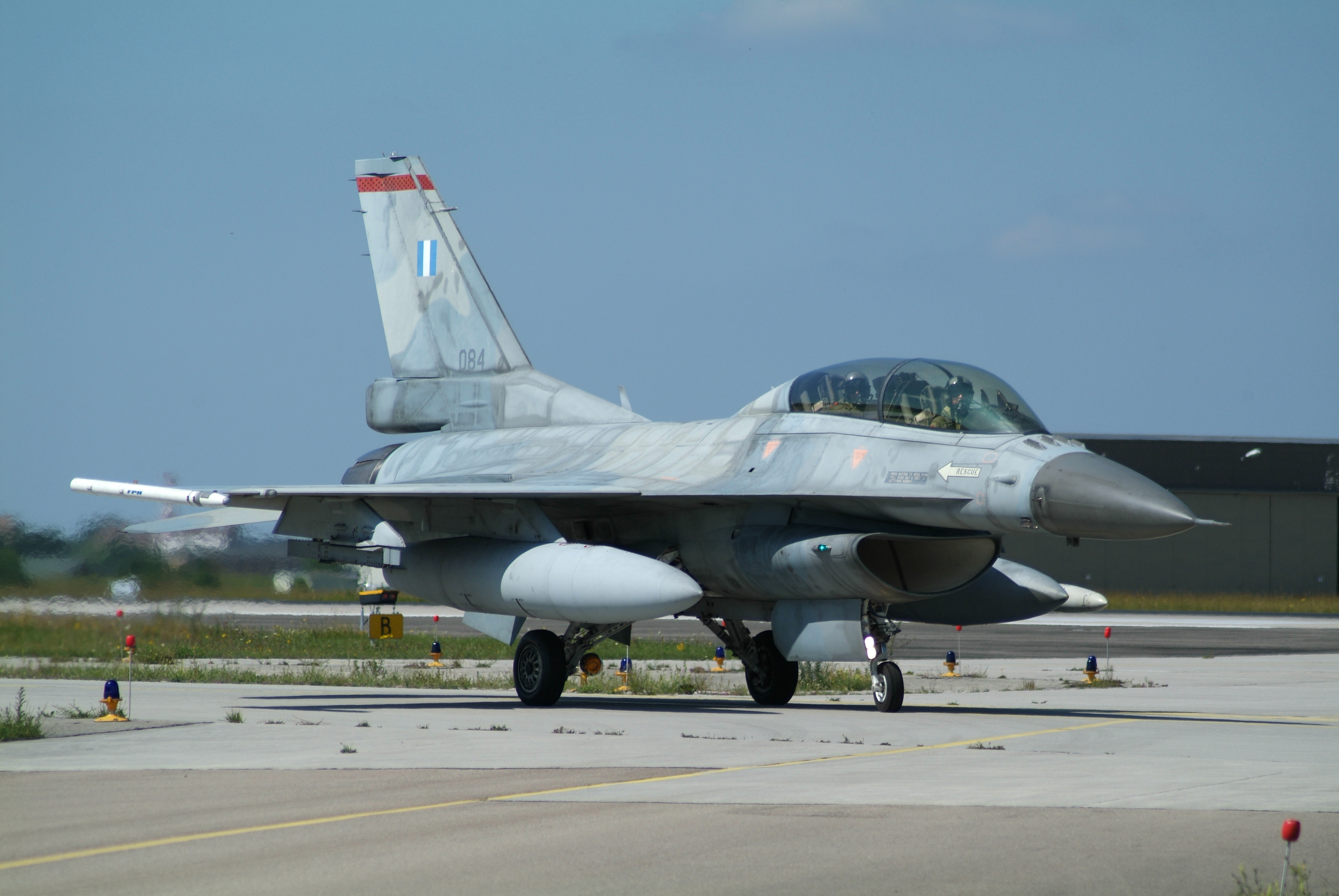
- 084, the F-16D involved in the accident, photographed in 2008

Accident
- Date: 26 January 2015
- Summary: Crashed on take-off due to incorrect takeoff configuration
- Site: Los Llanos Air Base, Albacete, Spain; 38°56′54″N 01°51′48″W
- Total fatalities: 11
- Total injuries: 33

Aircraft
- Aircraft type: General Dynamics F-16D Fighting Falcon
- Operator: Hellenic Air Force
- Registration: 084
- Occupants: 2
- Crew: 2
- Fatalities: 2
- Survivors: 0

Ground casualties
- Ground fatalities: 9
- Ground injuries: 33

On 26 January 2015, an F-16D Fighting Falcon jet fighter of the Hellenic Air Force crashed into a flight line shortly after take-off at Los Llanos Air Base in Albacete, Spain, killing 11 people: the two crew members and nine personnel on the ground. Thirty-three others, all on the ground, were injured.

== Background ==
Los Llanos Air Base is the venue of NATO's Tactical Leadership Program (TLP), a regular series of training exercises for personnel from ten NATO member air forces. In January 2015, during TLP2015-1, several NATO air forces deployed aircraft to the base, including four F-16 Block 50 fighter aircraft of the Hellenic Air Force's 341st Squadron, supported by 41 pilots and technicians from the 111th Combat Wing, based at Nea Anchialos Air Base.

== Accident ==
On 26 January 2015, one of the Greek F-16s crashed into other aircraft at Shelter D-4 of the air base shortly after takeoff, causing an explosion which killed 9 people. Approximately one and a half seconds before impact, the back seat pilot ejected from the aircraft followed shortly by the front seat pilot half a second later. Both pilots suffered fatal injuries.

Those immediately killed included the two Greek crew members of the F-16 and eight French personnel on the ground. 34 individuals were injured, 17 of them severely. The following day, a French airman who was severely burned in the accident died, bringing the death toll to eleven.

In addition to the loss of personnel, the crash resulted in the write-off of two Dassault Mirage 2000D fighters and two Alpha Jet trainers of the French Air Force and one AMX A-11 Ghibli of the Italian Air Force. One French Dassault Rafale was also slightly damaged along with a second Italian A-11 and a US Air Force F-15E from RAF Lakenheath.

== Investigation ==
Initial findings were that a technical fault developed on board the F-16 during take-off, and the two crew members had tried to eject. Aviation analyst Sean Maffett told the BBC News Channel that it was "difficult to imagine how the accident had occurred, because the runway where the aircraft was taking off was about 1,000 ft (305m) away from where the crash apparently took place."

Six months later, in July, investigators determined that a 'loose checklist' may have caused the aircraft to crash. According to a safety investigation board report by the French Defense Ministry, a manual knob in the cockpit that controlled the trim tab on the tail rudder was inadvertently turned all the way to the right, causing the plane to roll uncontrollably to the right seconds after takeoff. Some time before the F-16D took off, "the yaw trim was set to the maximum right deflection, drastically affecting the aerodynamics of the aircraft during takeoff," the report said.

Though there are safety guards mounted on either side of the yaw trim switch to prevent unintentionally moving it, investigators believe one of three loose flight checklists in the cockpit must have jammed the knob all the way to the right. The checklists were to be placed in the cockpit's stowage compartment, but the lead pilot stored his flight bag in the compartment instead, the report said.

Physical tests performed by the safety investigation board members determined that while it's difficult to inadvertently turn the knob, an object such as a checklist - they are usually laminated - pushed between the yaw knob and the safety guard "can cause the same roll and yaw trim movements as recorded" in the aircraft.

The Hellenic Air Force jet crashed about 7.8 seconds after takeoff, as the askew trim tab forced the plane to bank hard to the right and pulled its nose down. The lead pilot's "left control stick inputs were insufficient to cease the right roll," the report said.

The lead pilot "had to react in the unforgiving altitude of no more than 6 feet, the fact that the landing gear was left in the down position can be considered as a clear indication of the surprising nature of the problem."
