= Albacete Airport =

Domestic and military airport in Albacete, Spain

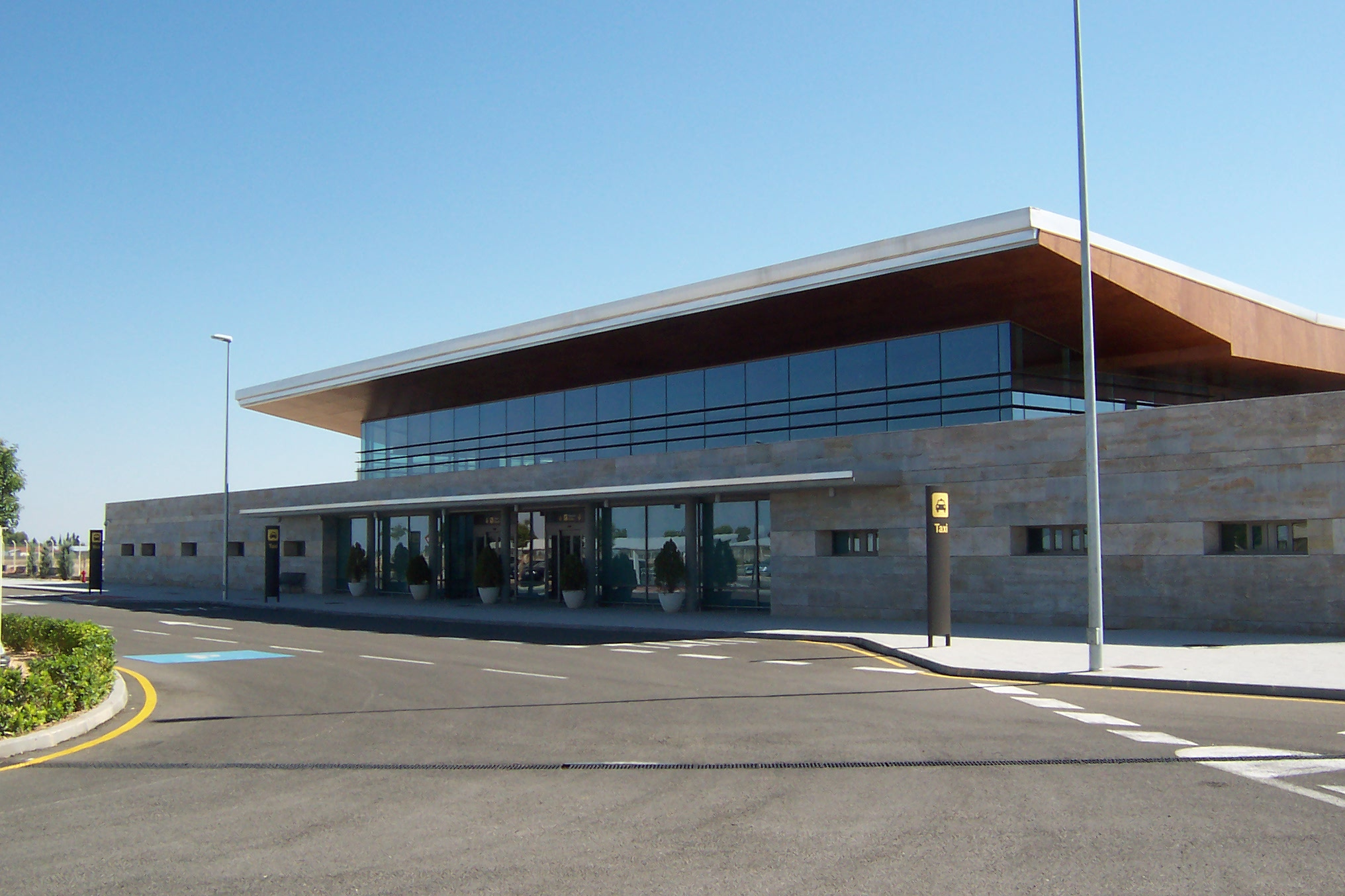
- IATA: ABC; ICAO: LEAB

Summary
- Airport type: Public/military
- Operator: AENA
- Location: Albacete, Spain
- Elevation AMSL: 2,301 ft / 701 m
- Coordinates: 38°56′54″N 01°51′48″W

Map
- Location within Spain

Runways
| Direction | Length | | Surface |
| Direction | m | ft | Surface |
|---|---|---|---|
| 09/27 | 2,700 | 8,858 | Asphalt |

Statistics (2017)
- Passengers: 1.380
- Passengers change 16-17: ▲8,1%
- Movements: 430

Albacete Airport (IATA: ABC, ICAO: LEAB) is an airport operated by Aena located about 4 miles (6 kilometres) south of the city of Albacete, the capital of the province of Albacete in Castile-La Mancha, Spain. It shares the runway and some facilities with Los Llanos Air Base, operated by the Spanish Air and Space Force.

The airport is served by road CM-3203. It began operation as a civilian airport on 1 July 2003, after seventy-plus years solely used by the military. The first flight was flown by Hola Airlines to the Balearic Islands. Albacete and Ciudad Real Central Airport are the only public airports in Castilla La Mancha. However, since the closure of Ciudad Real Central Airport and the cessation of scheduled services from Albacete, the region has been left without any scheduled passenger services.

The nearest passenger airports are Madrid–Barajas Airport, Valencia Airport, Alicante–Elche Miguel Hernández Airport and Murcia Airport.

== History ==
Construction started in 1913, but was then quickly stopped, with operations only starting in 1929 after the Spanish Aviation Company (CEA) took up a contract for pilot training. During the Spanish Civil War, the base was used by military rebels, and from 26 July 1936 by the Republicans. On cessations of activities the newly formed Spanish Air Force established the 13th Bomber Squadron, later becoming Ala26. After World War II with an anticipated increase in civilian traffic, the Spanish government acquired the site in July 1946, increasing the runway to 2,050 metres (6,730 ft). Closed to civil traffic in 1955, in 1965, it reopened to the Albacete Flying Club. In 1962, Ala37 replaced Ala26, equipped with the Douglas DC-3 freighter. In 1975, Ala14 took over residency, equipped with the Dassault Mirage F1 fighter. In 1991, due to the promotion of Albacete Balompié to the first division, the airport reopened to civilian charter traffic.

== Facilities ==
Opened again to civilian traffic in 2003, in November 2005 the Ministry of Public Works inaugurated the new Terminal Building, with a surface area of 2,200 square metres (24,000 sq ft). Situated at an elevation of 2,302 feet (702 m) above mean sea level, today it has one runway designated 09/27 with an asphalt surface measuring 2,700 by 60 metres (8,858 ft × 197 ft).

The civilian-run maintenance facility La Maestranza Aérea de Albacete is responsible for the modifications and overhaul of some military equipment, including all Dassault Mirage F1 (retired in 2013, replaced by Eurofighter Typhoon), Canadair CL-215 and CASA C-101.

== Airlines and destinations ==
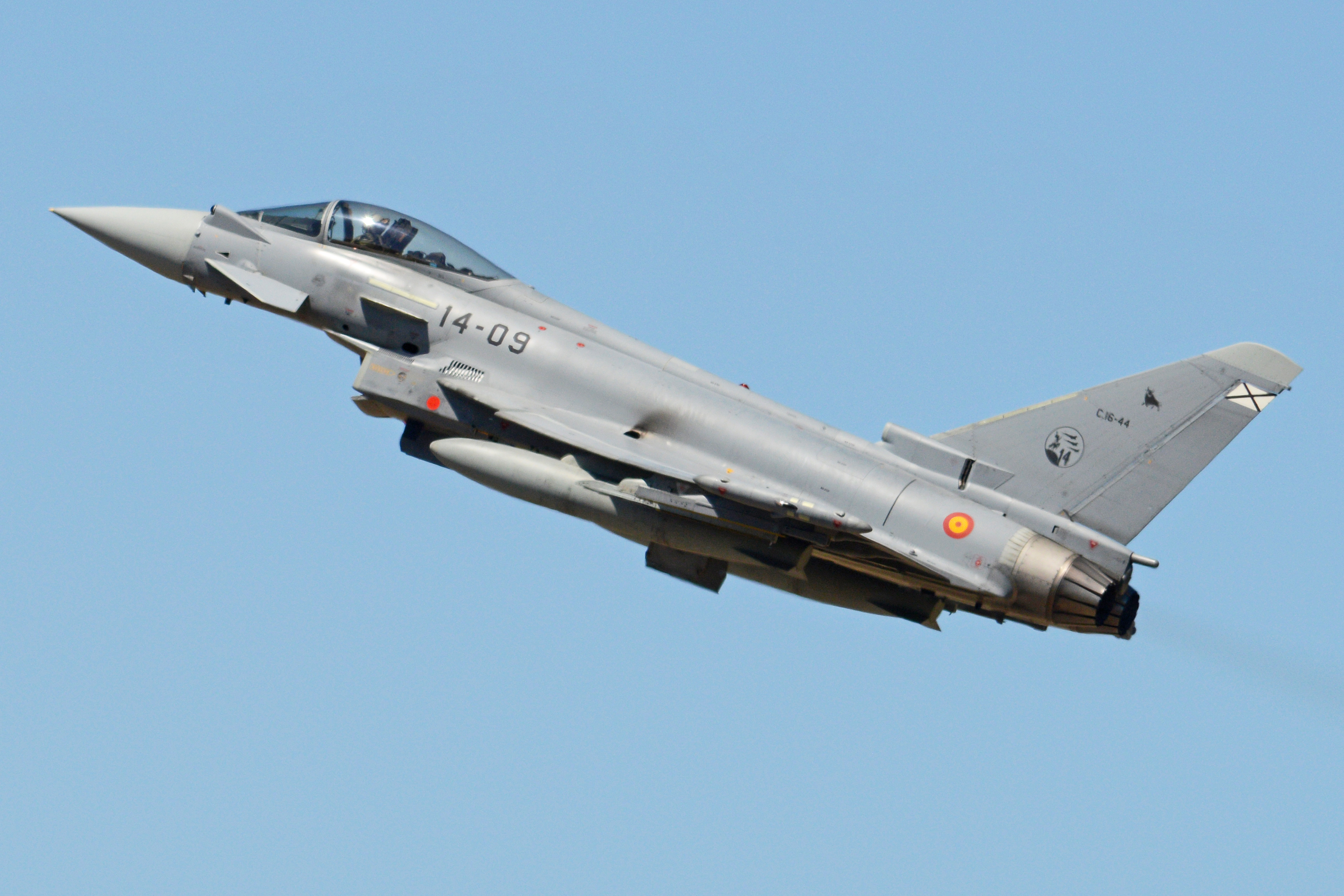
Eurofighter Typhoon of the Spanish Air and Space Force taking off from the airport

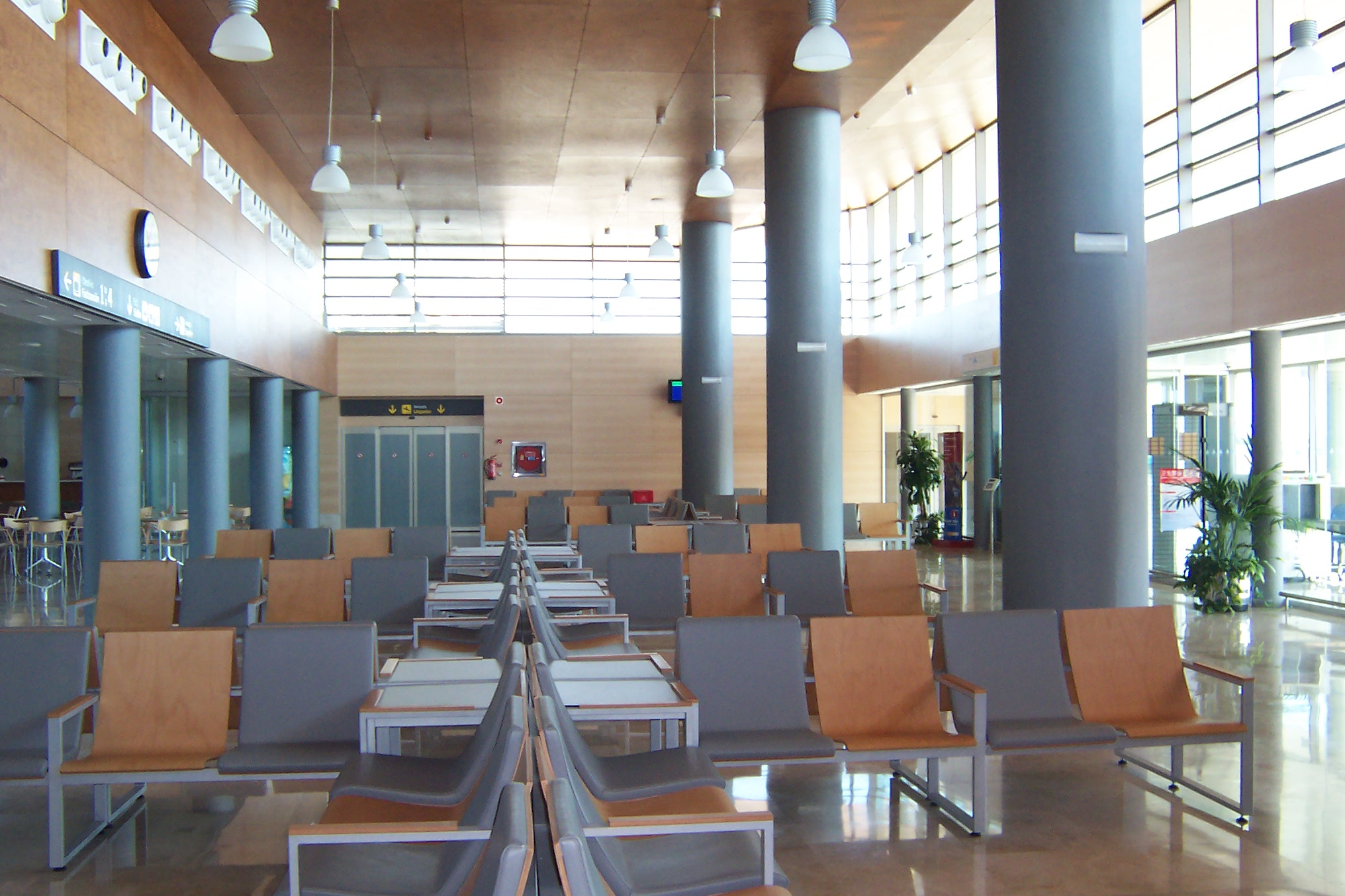
Interior view of the terminal

There are no scheduled services from Albacete Airport.

== NATO TLP ==
Since July 2009, the base has been the site of NATO's Tactical Leadership Program, taking over from Belgium's Florennes Air Base.

== Accidents ==
- 26 January 2015: a Greek F-16 fighter jet crashed into parked aircraft and personnel while attempting to take off, killing both crew members on board. Nine people on the ground were also killed, and 21 more injured.

== Statistics ==
Total passengers by year:

| Year | Passengers |
|---|---|
| 2007 | 19,881 |
| 2008 | 19,254 |
| 2009 | 15,127 |
| 2010 | 11,298 |
| 2011 | 8,415 |
| 2012 | 3,916 |
| 2013 | 1,211 |
| 2014 | 1,411 |
| 2015 | 1,353 |
| 2016 | 1,277 |
| 2017 | 1,380 |
