= John Marlow Thompson =

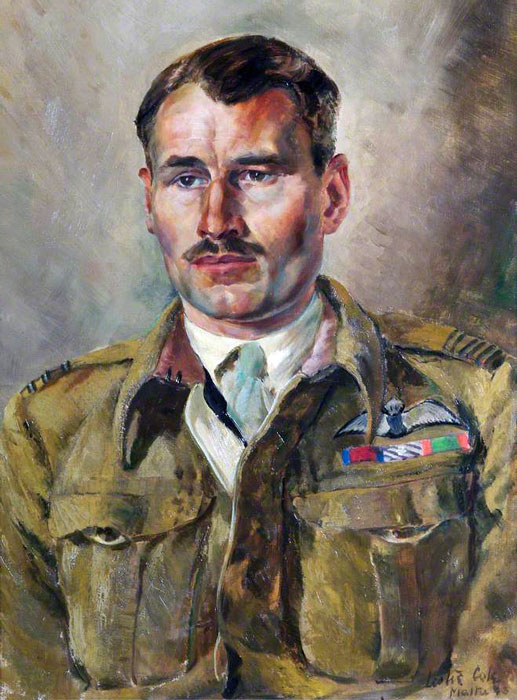
- Portrait of Thompson, made by Leslie Cole in 1943
- Born: 16 August 1914; Keynsham, Somerset
- Died: 23 July 1994 (aged 79); Brighton, Sussex
- Military career
- Allegiance: United Kingdom
- Branch: Royal Air Force
- Service years: 1934–1966
- Rank: Air Commodore
- Nickname: 'Tommy'
- Commands: Military Air Traffic Organisation (1962–66); Director of Air Defence (1958–60); RAF Leeming (1957–58); No. 338 Wing RAF (1944); RAF Hal Far (1943–44); No. 350 Squadron (1941–42); No. 131 Squadron (1941); No. 111 Squadron (1940)
- Conflicts: Second World War: Battle of France; Battle of Britain; Siege of Malta
- Awards: Commander of the Order of the British Empire; Distinguished Service Order; Distinguished Flying Cross & Bar; Air Force Cross; Military Cross, First Class (Belgium)

Air Commodore John Marlow Thompson, CBE, DSO, DFC & Bar, AFC (16 August 1914 – 23 July 1994) was a Royal Air Force (RAF) officer and a flying ace of the Second World War. He is credited with having destroyed at least eight enemy aircraft.

Born in Somerset, England, Thompson joined the RAF in 1934 and once his training was completed was posted to No. 29 Squadron. Following the outbreak of the Second World War, he became commander of No. 111 Squadron which he led through the Battle of France and the subsequent Battle of Britain. During this time, he achieved a number of aerial victories. In mid-1942 he was sent to the Middle East and was a wing leader, operating from Malta for several months. He held a series of staff and command posts for the remainder of the war. He stayed in the RAF in the postwar period, eventually ending his military career in 1966 as commander of the Military Air Traffic Organisation. He worked briefly in civil aviation before becoming involved in golf club administration. He retired in 1983 and died in Brighton eleven years later aged 79.

== Early life ==
John Marlow Thompson, who became nicknamed 'Tommy' was born on 16 August 1914 in Keynsham, Somerset, and was educated at Bristol Grammar School. He gained a short service commission as an acting pilot officer in the Royal Air Force (RAF) in March 1934. The following month, he commenced training at No. 5 Flying Training School at Sealand. He completed his pilot training in March 1935, was confirmed in his pilot officer rank and posted to No. 29 Squadron. The following August he was transferred to No. 151 Squadron and a month later was promoted to flying officer.

By September 1937 Thompson was a flight commander with the squadron, having received a further promotion to flight lieutenant. In 1938, he married Margaret Rowlands; the couple went on to have three children.

== Second World War ==
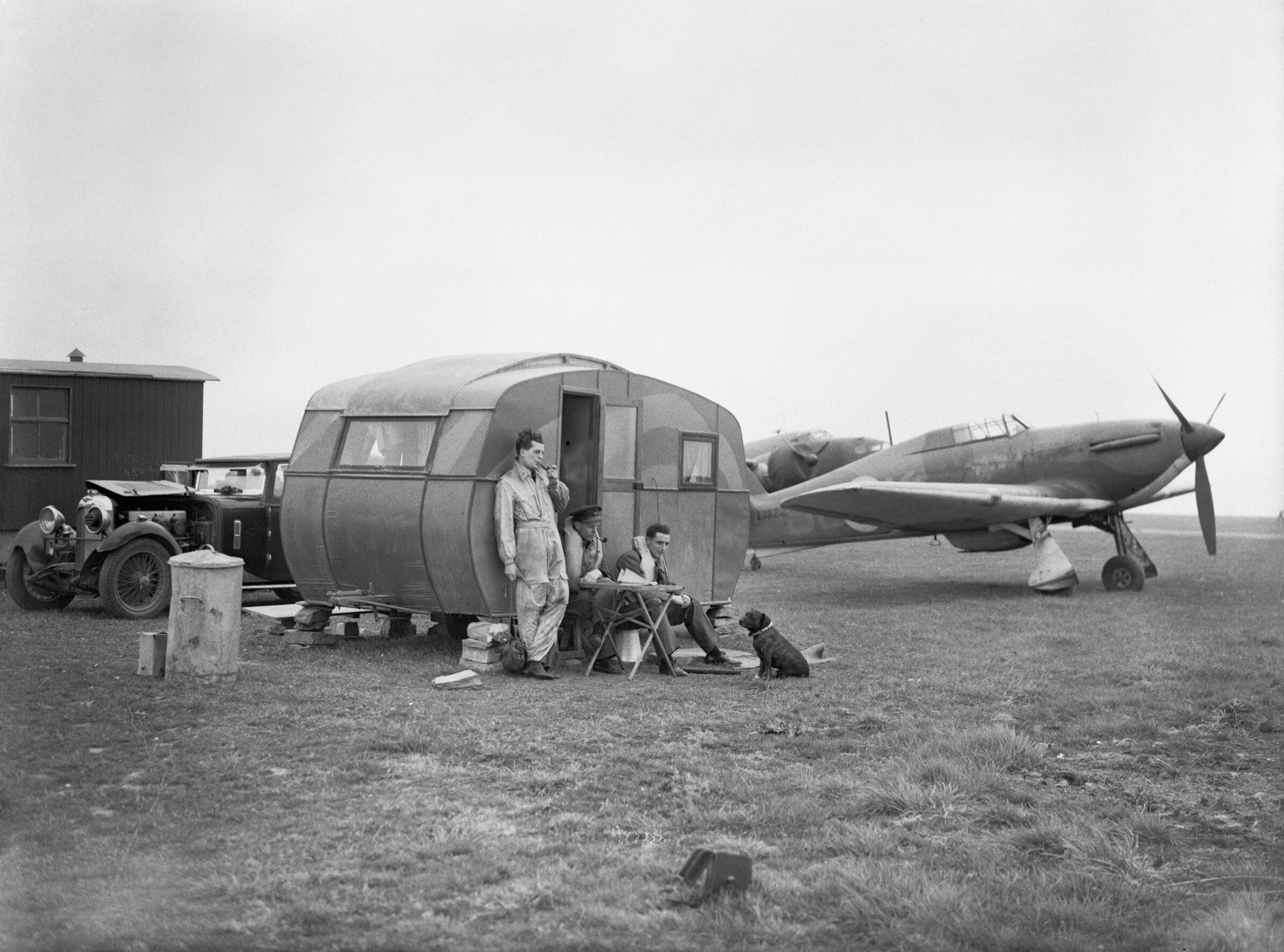
A Hawker Hurricane of No. 111 Squadron at Wick, in early 1940

In January 1940, and with the Second World War well underway, Thompson was promoted to acting squadron leader and given command of No. 111 Squadron. Based at Drem in Scotland, the squadron was equipped with Hawker Hurricane fighters. It moved the following month to Wick, where it provided the Royal Navy base at Scapa Flow with aerial cover. By May 1940, the squadron was back in the south of England, based at Northolt.

=== Battle of France ===
Thompson first saw action during the German invasion of France and the Low Countries, leading No. 111 Squadron in patrols over France. On 18 May, he destroyed two Messerschmitt Bf 110 heavy fighters to the south of Douai although only one of these was able to be confirmed. The following day his Hurricane was damaged during an engagement with a group of Heinkel He 111 medium bombers that were being escorted by Bf 110s. Although one He 111 was claimed as destroyed, this could not be confirmed and he force-landed near Valenciennes. With the assistance of nearby British soldiers, he was able to make his way back to England, finding passage on a ship sailing from Boulogne.

Returning to No. 111 Squadron, Thompson flew in support of the evacuation of the British Expeditionary Force from Dunkirk. On 31 May he shot down a Messerschmitt Bf 109 fighter to the north of Dunkirk, but this was unconfirmed. The squadron subsequently provided escorts for the Fleet Air Arm's bombing operations over the French coast and during one of these, on 11 June, Thompson destroyed a Bf 109, damaged another and also engaged and damaged a Junkers Ju 88 medium bomber. The squadron was then briefly rested so it could train up replacement pilots.

=== Battle of Britain ===
In the early stages of the Battle of Britain, No. 111 Squadron was based at Croydon, initially patrolling over the English Channel and then being engaged in the aerial fighting over the southeast of England. Under Thompson's leadership, the squadron developed the tactic of making head-on attacks on approaching Luftwaffe bomber formations. He damaged a Dornier Do 17 medium bomber near Folkestone on 10 July and damaged another the following day, several miles east of North Foreland. During an engagement on 13 August with more Do 17s over Eastchurch, he destroyed one and damaged another. Two days later he shot down a Do 17 over the Thames Estuary and a Bf 110 near Croydon. He also claimed a Bf 109 as damaged the same day. Another Do 17 was shot down near Dungeness by Thompson on 16 August. For his exploits over the past few months, he was awarded the Distinguished Flying Cross (DFC) in September. The published citation read:

This officer has commanded a squadron since January, 1940, and has operated over various areas in Northern France. He has taken part in nearly every patrol and, under his leadership, eighty-one enemy aircraft have been destroyed, twelve probably destroyed and at least forty-four damaged. He has, himself, shot down eight and damaged at least six enemy aircraft.

— The London Gazette, No. 34940, 6 September 1940.

=== Channel Front ===
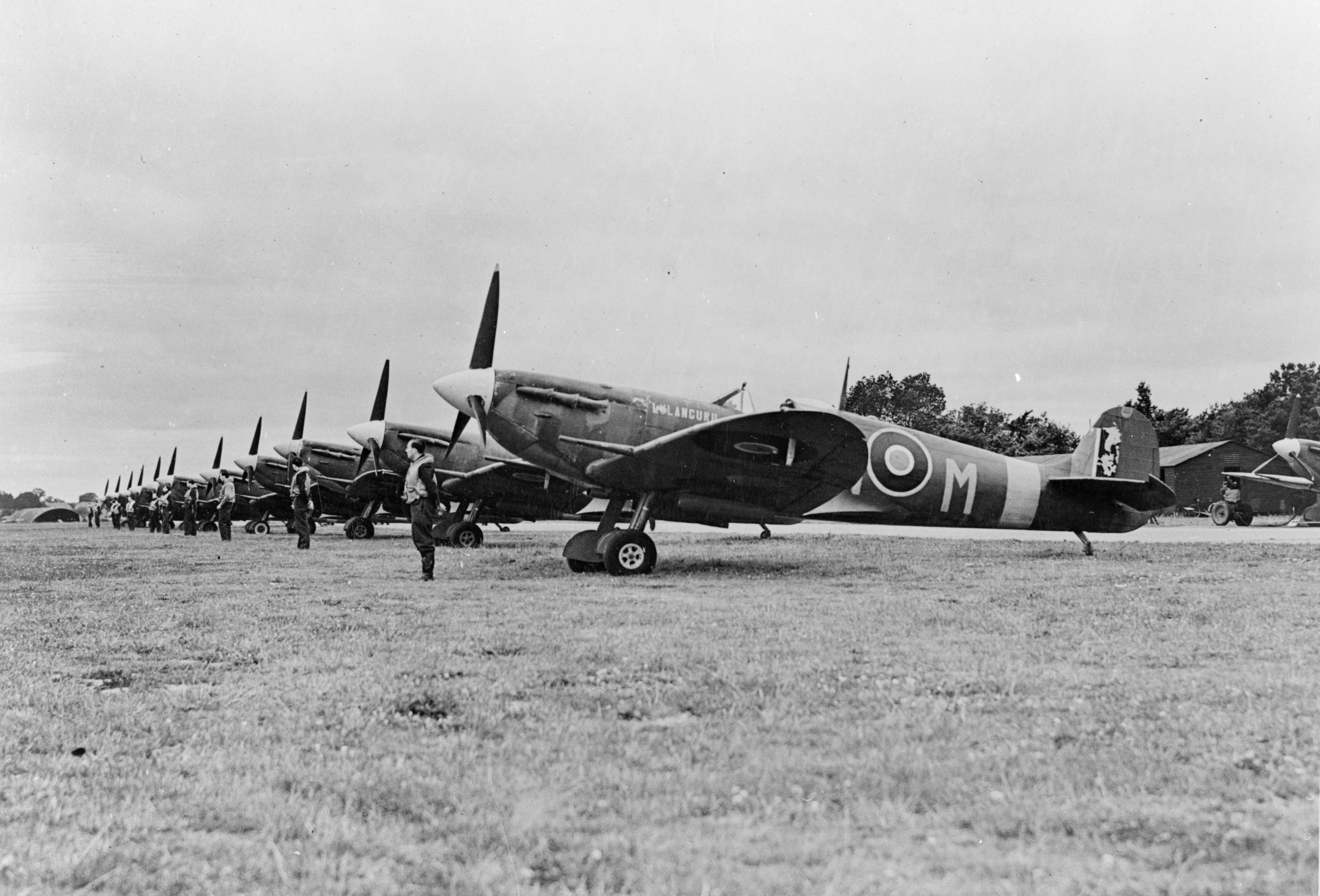
Supermarine Spitfires of No. 350 Squadron

Thompson moved into an air staff position at the headquarters of 11 Group in October 1940, where he remained for several months. Then, in June 1941, he was given command of No. 131 Squadron. This was a new squadron, formed at Ouston around a cadre of Belgian pilots and equipped with Supermarine Spitfire fighters.

Thompson worked the unit up to operational status by October and the following month he and several Belgian pilots were detached to form the basis of No. 350 Squadron. A dedicated unit of Belgian fighter pilots, it was based at Valley and equipped with Spitfires. It became operational in December and carried out air cover patrols for shipping in the Irish Sea and was also occasionally scrambled to deal with incoming German aircraft. Thompson led the squadron until he was rested in March 1942. He was later awarded the Belgian Military Cross, First Class, in recognition of his work with the Belgian squadron.

=== Malta ===
Newly promoted to wing commander, Thompson was sent to the Middle East and found himself without a role once in Egypt. He contrived to get himself sent to Malta in July, where he became the temporary wing leader of the Takali Fighter Wing. After a few weeks, the nominal commander of the wing arrived and Thompson took over leadership of the Hal Far Fighter Wing. Flying south of Sicily, he and another pilot shared in the destruction of a Ju 88 on 27 August. During the October blitz of Malta mounted by the Luftwaffe, Thompson achieved a number of aerial victories, the first of which being a Bf 109 that he shot down over St. Paul's Bay. He damaged a Bf 109 the following day and on 14 October damaged another Bf 109 and destroyed a Ju 88, the latter to the north of Zonkor. In December, he was awarded a Bar to his DFC and later in the month took command of the Luqa Fighter Wing, the third of Malta's fighter wings. He was the only RAF officer to command all of the island's fighter wings. In May 1943, Thompson was awarded the Distinguished Service Order, the published citation reading:

This officer has a fine operational record. He fought in France and later took part in the Battle of Britain. For the past 9 months he has been engaged in flying operations from Malta, playing a prominent part in the defence of the island during a period of intense air attacks. Latterly, Wing Commander Thompson has led formations of fighter-bombers in numerous successful attacks against port installations, factories, airfields and other targets. By his great skill and brilliant leadership, Wing Commander Thompson has contributed in a large measure to the excellent results obtained.

— The London Gazette, No. 36015, 14 May 1943.

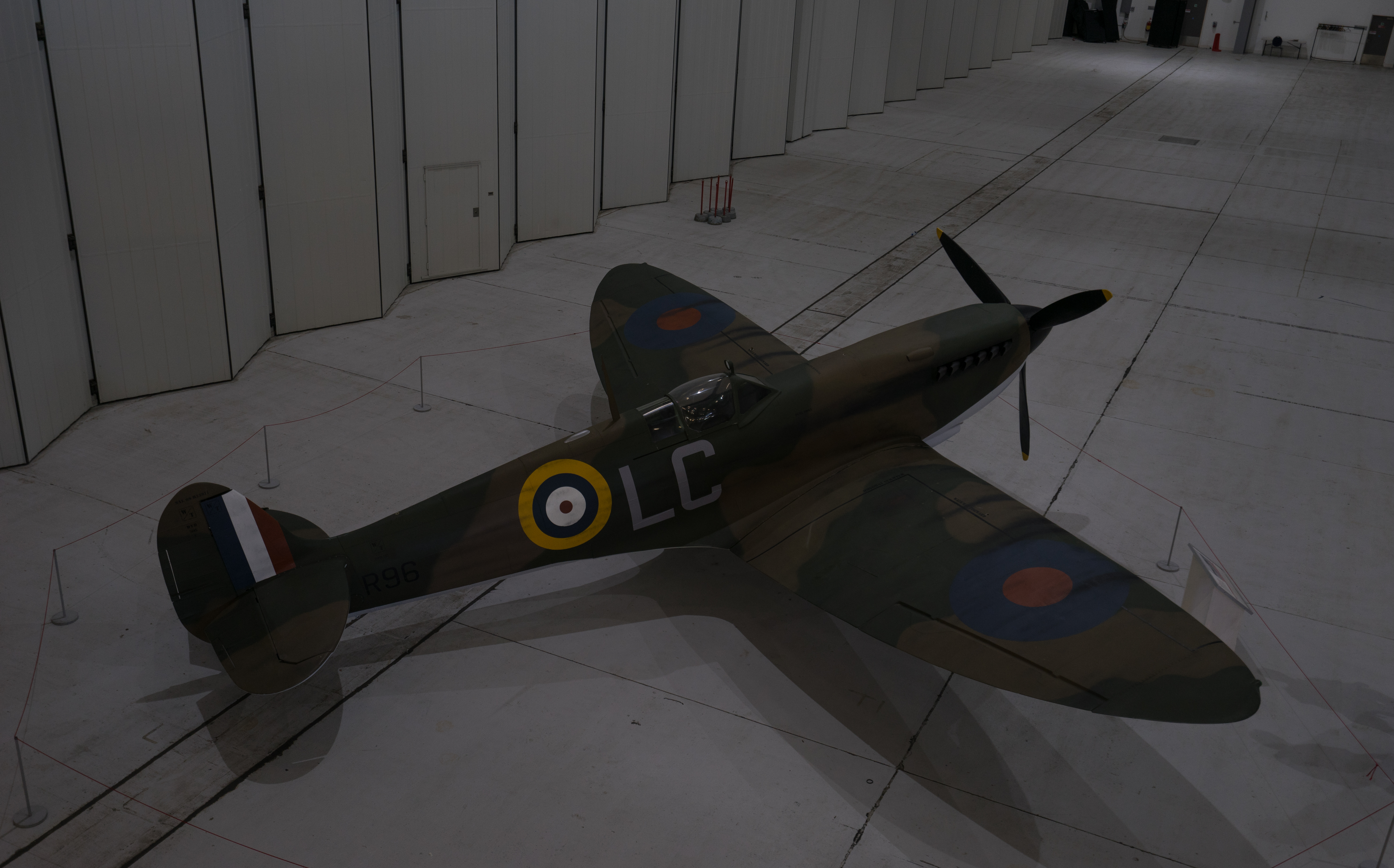
Thompson flew this Spitfire, which has been restored to flying condition, for a time during his service on Malta

=== Later war service ===
In June, Thompson was posted to RAF headquarters on Malta, with responsibility for training. Soon afterwards, he became ill with diphtheria and was hospitalised for several weeks. On his recovery, he was commanding officer of the RAF station at Hal Far until February 1944, then briefly led a fighter wing that was based at Palermo, in Sicily for a time before taking up command of No. 338 Wing, based in Algiers. He held various staff roles thereafter and by August 1945 Thompson was sector commander at North Weald.

He ended the war credited with having destroyed eight confirmed enemy aircraft, with a share in two more destroyed. Three more were unconfirmed destroyed, one probably destroyed and one shared and seven damaged.

== Postwar career ==
Thompson attended the RAF Staff College at Bracknell in September 1945 and was then posted to the headquarters British Air Forces of Occupation in Germany. In June 1948 the Russians blockaded Berlin, cutting off the city's land and water access routes. Thompson was heavily involved in the organisation of the Berlin airlift. After three years in Germany, he was wing leader at Thorney Island, flying Gloster Meteor fighter jets. In January 1952, he was awarded the Air Force Cross. Promoted to group captain in July 1953, Thompson became senior air staff officer at No. 11 Group and was subsequently officer commanding the RAF station at Leeming. In the 1955 New Year Honours, he was appointed a Commander of the Order of the British Empire He became the Director of Air Defence at the Air Ministry in December 1958, was promoted to air commodore the following year, and then went to the Imperial Defence College for a year. His last appointment was as commander of the Military Air Traffic Organisation in 1962 until he retired from the RAF in September 1966.

== Later life ==
Thompson's aviation expertise was in demand and shortly after his retirement he became the general manager of Airwork in Saudi Arabia for two years. He also acted as an aviation consultant. In 1969 he became secretary of the Moor Park Golf Club in Hertfordshire which was followed by an 11-year tenure as secretary of the Monte Carlo Golf Club. In 1983 he retired to Sussex where he lived until his death in Brighton on 23 July 1994.
