= Joseph Moureau =

Belgian fighter pilot (1921–2020)

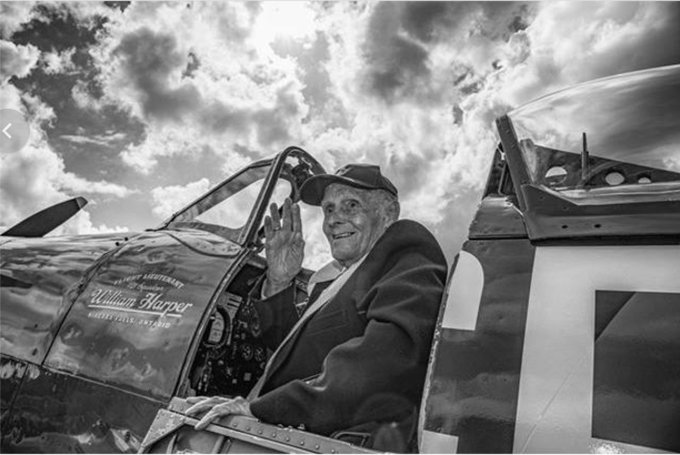
- Joseph Moureau in 2019 in a spitfire
- Born: 13 April 1921; Tienen
- Died: 28 October 2020 (aged 99); Jette
- Military career
- Allegiance: Belgium; United Kingdom
- Nickname: "Jeff"
- Conflicts: Second World War
- Other work: Civilian pilot

Joseph "Jeff" Moureau (13 April 1921 – 28 October 2020) was a Belgian fighter pilot of the 349th (Belgian) Squadron belonging to the Royal Air Force during World War II.

== Life ==
A few days after the German invasion in Belgium, in 1940, he fled together with his twin brother Alfred to England. A few months after their arrival in England both brothers joined the British air force, applying to be pilots. After an intense training both were assigned as spitfire fighter pilots in the 349th RAF squadron that was mainly formed by Belgian personnel. During his stay in this squadron Moureau had a severe accident, but he returned to his unit (without a medical clearance) right in time for D-Day. During D-Day, Operation Overlord, on 6 June 1944, Moureau shot down a German Junker Ju 88 bomber.

After World War II he became a civilian airline pilot and flew for over 30 years with different airplanes for, Sobelair and later Sabena. He was the last living Belgian pilot that was active on D-Day. He died in 2020 aged 99. Alfred also pursued a career with Sabena after the war and died in 2012.

Of note, Joseph's younger brother Xavier Moureau left Brussels in 1942 to reach England and join the Belgian army in exile. He was however intercepted near the demarcation line in France and detained by the Gestapo. He was then incarcerated as a political prisoner and sent to multiple concentration camps (Dachau, Sachsenhausen, Buchenwald and Flossenbürg). After surviving the Mülsen death march in April 1945, he returned to Brussels but died shortly after arriving home due to tuberculosis contracted in the camps. He was 21 years old.
