= Medal of a liberated France =

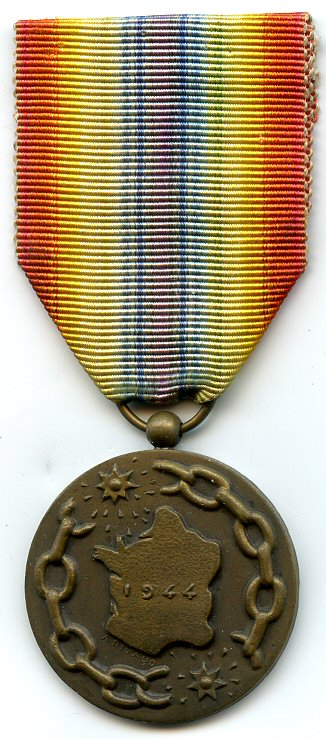
- Medal of a liberated France (obverse)
- Type: Decoration
- Awarded for: Participation in the liberation of France in the Second World War
- Presented by: France
- Eligibility: Military and civilian French and foreign nationals
- Status: Not awarded since 1957
- Established: 12 September 1947
- Final award: 7 July 1957

Highlights
- Total: 13,469
- Ribbon of the Medal of a liberated France

Precedence
- Next (higher): Médaille commémorative de la guerre 1939–1945
- Next (lower): Insigne du réfractaire au STO

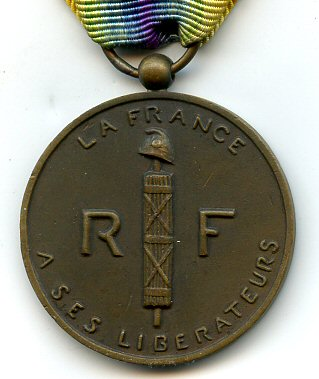
Medal of a liberated France (reverse)

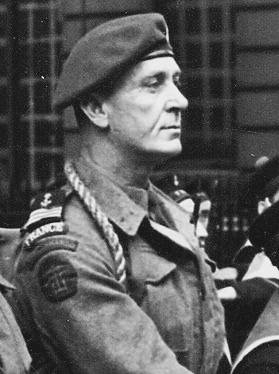
French Navy, Commander Philippe Kieffer, a recipient of the Medal of a liberated France

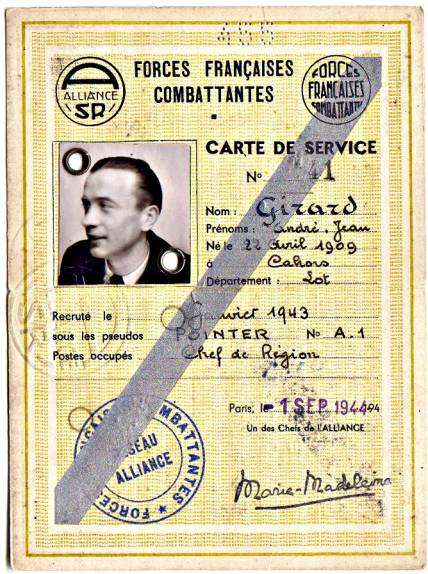
French Resistance member André Girard, a recipient of the Medal of a liberated France

The Medal of a liberated France (French: "Médaille de la France libérée") was a decoration of the French Republic created by decree on 12 September 1947 and originally named the "Medal of Gratitude of a Liberated France" (French: "Médaille de la Reconnaissance de la France Libérée"). It was intended as a reward for French and foreign nationals that had made a notable contribution to the liberation of France from the German occupation.

A decree of 7 October 1947 defined the medal's design and added it would be awarded under the authority of the Minister for Veterans' Affairs and Victims of War (French: Ministre des Anciens Combattants et Victimes de guerre) on advice from a board composed of twenty-one members including the President of the National Assembly, the Vice-President of the State Council, a representative of the National Council of the Resistance, a general officer and a representative of the Justice Ministry.

A later decree of 16 June 1948 gave it its present name and added a member from the Interior Ministry to the board charged with selecting recipients from the applications. A further decree of 4 June 1949 followed by ministerial instructions on 1 December 1950 redefined both the composition of the board and award prerequisites.

The board was composed of:

- Grand chancellor of the Legion of Honour;
- Chancellor of the Order of Liberation;
- Representative of the Keeper of the Seals of France;
- Representative of the Ministry of Foreign Affairs;
- Representative of the Ministry of the Interior;
- General officer designated by the Minister of Defence;
- Four representatives from veterans' and war victims' organizations designated by the minister. This number was brought up to five by a decree of 19 January 1950 and to six by a decree of 20 April 1951.

== Award statute ==
The Medal of a liberated France could be awarded:

- To soldiers of the allied armies who participated in war operations on the soil of Metropolitan France or soil under French mandate between 3 September 1939 and 20 August 1945;
- To soldiers of allied armies who served as liaison with the French forces between 18 June 1940 and 20 August 1945;
- To French nationals who made a notable contribution to the liberation of Metropolitan France or soil under French mandate between 18 June 1940 and 20 August 1945.

Recipients of the following French awards received in conjunction with the liberation of France could not receive the Medal of a liberated France:

- Legion of Honour for feats with the resistance;
- Cross of the Order of Liberation;
- Military Medal for feats with the resistance;
- Resistance Medal;
- Medal of French Gratitude for feats with the resistance.

== Award description ==
The Medal of a liberated France was a 35mm in diameter circular medal struck from bronze. The obverse bore the relief image of France with the relief date "1944" at its center. A relief chain encircles the image of France with two breaks in its links, one North-east, the other South-west, symbolizing the allied landings. The reverse bore the relief image of a Fasces below a Phrygian cap bisecting the initials "R.F." and the relief inscription "LA FRANCE A SES LIBERATEURS" (English: "FRANCE TO ITS LIBERATORS") along the upper and lower circumference.

The medal hung from a 36mm wide rainbow coloured silk moiré ribbon, the colours placed opposite those of the ribbon of the 1914–1918 Inter-Allied Victory medal with the purple at center.

== Notable recipients (partial list) ==
- Commander Philippe Kieffer-Country of Allegiance: France(République française), Free France(La France Libre), Service: French Navy (Marine Nationale), Free French Naval Forces(Forces Navales Françaises), Rank: Commander(Capitaine de frégate)
- Captain Émile Allegret- France(République française), Free France(La France Libre), Service: French Airforce(Armée de l'Air), Free French Airforce(Forces Aériennes Françaises Libres), Rank: Capitaine(Captain), Commands: Bombardment Group "Lorraine"Squadron 342(Les Equipages Du Groupe "Lorraine” Squadron 342)
- Resistance member Augustin Le Maresquier- Country of Allegiance: France(République française), Free France(La France Libre), Service: French Resistance(La Résistance), French Forces of the Interior(Forces françaises de l'intérieur)
- Resistance member Antoinette Feuerwerker-Country of Allegiance: France(République française), Free France(La France Libre), Service: French Resistance(La Résistance), French Forces of the Interior(Forces françaises de l'intérieur)
- Resistance member André Girard-Country of Allegiance: France(République française), Free France(La France Libre), Service: French Resistance(La Résistance), French Forces of the Interior(Forces françaises de l'intérieur), Rank: Voluntary Combatant of the Resistance (Combattante Volontaire de la Résistance)
- Free French soldier Louis Saget-Country of Allegiance: France(République française), Free France(La France Libre), Service: Free French Forces(Forces françaises libres)
- Belgian general baron Georges Danloy-Country of Allegiance: Belgium(Royaume de Belgique) Service: Belgian Army(Composante terre), Rank: Lieutenant General(Generalleutnant)
- Belgian general baron Michel Donnet-Country of Allegiance: Belgium(Royaume de Belgique), United Kingdom, Service: Belgian Army(Composante terre), Royal Air Force, Rank: Wing commander(Lieutenant colonel);UK Service, Lieutenant General(Generalleutnant);Post War Belgian Service
- United States Army major Richard Winters-- Country of Allegiance: United States of America, Service: United States Army, Rank: Major, Commands: 2nd Battalion, 506th Parachute Infantry Regiment, 101st Airborne Division
- United States Army first lieutenant Audie Murphy-Country of Allegiance: United States of America, Service: United States Army, Rank: First Lieutenant
- French-American academic Bernard B. Fall-Country of Allegiance: France(République française), Free France(La France Libre), Service: French Resistance(La Résistance), French Army(Armée de Terre)

== See also ==
- Ribbons of the French military and civil awards
- Awards and decorations of the United States military
