= 2nd Tactical Wing =

- Active: 1947
- Country: Belgium
- Branch: Belgian Air Force
- Garrison/HQ: Florennes Air Base
- March: Taïaut-Taïaut
- Mascot: A wild boar called Bullrush

Aircraft flown
- Fighter: F-16 Fighting Falcon, previously; Dassault Mirage 5, and the F-84 Thunderflash

The 2nd Tactical Wing (Dutch: 2 Tactische Wing, French: 2 Wing Tactique) is a wing in the Belgian Air Force of the Belgian Armed Forces based at Florennes air base in the Southern French speaking part of Belgium near the (small) city of Dinant. It comprises the 1st Squadron and the 350th Squadron of the Air Force. The 2nd Squadron (disbanded & absorbed in 350th Squadron) had the famous patch/logo of a red comet (Dutch: De komeet, French: La comete)
