= Michel Donnet =

- Born: 1 April 1917; Richmond, Surrey, England
- Died: 31 July 2013 (aged 96); Waterloo, Belgium
- Military career
- Allegiance: Belgium; United Kingdom
- Branch: Belgian Army (1938–40); Royal Air Force (1941–45); Belgian Air Force (1945–75)
- Service years: 1938–1975
- Rank: Lieutenant General
- Nickname: "Mike"
- Commands: No. 350 Squadron RAF (1944); No. 64 Squadron RAF (1942)
- Conflicts: Second World War; European Theatre; Battle of Belgium
- Awards: Grand Officer of the Order of the Crown; Croix de Guerre; Commander of the Royal Victorian Order (United Kingdom); Distinguished Flying Cross (United Kingdom); Knight of the Legion of Honour (France)

Michel G. L. "Mike" Donnet, CVO, DFC (1 April 1917 – 31 July 2013) was a Belgian pilot who served in the Belgian Army and British Royal Air Force (RAF) during the Second World War. He shot down four enemy aircraft confirmed, and achieved the RAF rank of wing commander. After the war, he returned to the Belgian Air Force, and held several important commands before retiring in 1975.

== Second World War ==
On 1 March 1938, he joined the Aviation Militaire Belge (Belgian Army Air Force). On 26 March 1939, he was commissioned as sergeant-pilot, and on 1 March 1940 he signed for a further three years' service. Donnet flew Renard R.31 reconnaissance aircraft with the 9/V/1Aé (9th Escadrille of the First Aviation Regiment) at Bierset. After the German invasion on 10 May 1940, he flew sorties during the 18-day campaign. On 1 June 1940, he was taken (POW) by German ground forces when Belgium capitulated, and he was held in camps in Germany and France. On 10 January 1941, he was repatriated to Belgium.

=== Flight to freedom ===
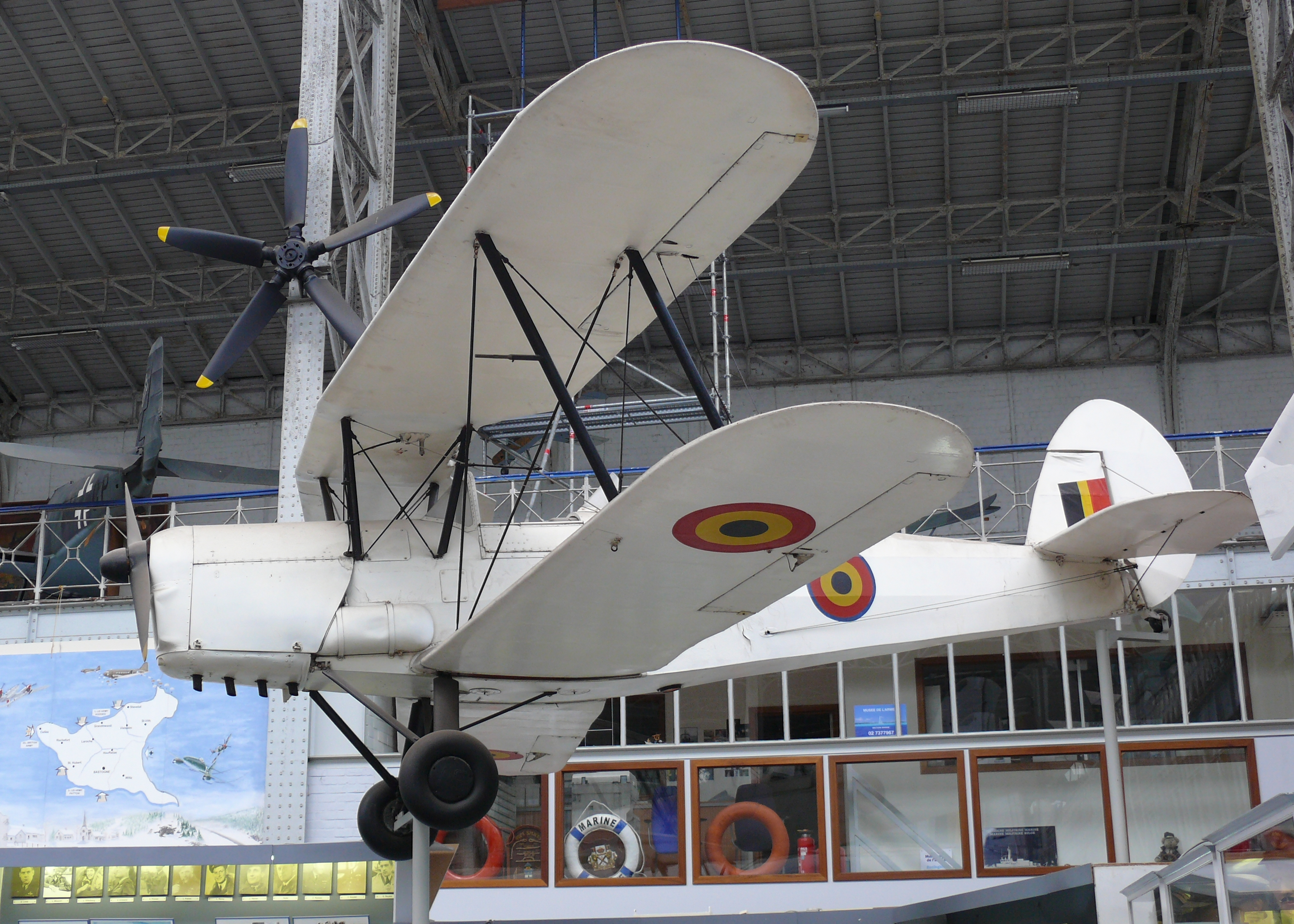
A replica of SV-4B OO-ATD at the Musée Royal de l'Armée

After release in German-occupied Belgium, he met his former colleague sergeant-pilot Léon Divoy, and they briefly planned to build an aircraft with which to escape to England. Their search for a propeller suggested that there was one still attached to a complete stored aeroplane. That proved to be a Stampe et Vertongen SV-4B (OO-ATD) which was owned by Baron Thierry d'Huart. It was stored in a locked small hangar at his property, the Chateau de Terblock outside Brussels.

Although German troops were stationed at the chateau, Donnet and Divoy spent four months preparing their plan, with the help of many trusted friends and the Belgian Resistance. This involved bicycle rides of three hours from the Stockel area of Brussels to Terbloc and return at night, improvisation of flying instruments, obtaining scarce petrol, and testing systems.

Divoy won the toss to pilot the SV-4B, but the aircraft had dual controls so Donnet would assist him. On 19 May 1941, they planned to fly, but the engine failed to start and the first attempt was abandoned. More work delayed the second attempt; finally at 0245 on 5 July 1941, they took off and headed approximately west-north-west towards the coast. After narrowly avoiding a searchlight, the engine stopped, but eventually picked up. After about two hours' flying, they sighted land during sunrise, but the geography did not match the intended destination in Kent. The engine started running roughly, so they landed at the nearest suitable landing area in a field. They quickly confirmed that they were in England, and headed on foot towards the nearest police station, Thorpe-le-Soken, near Clacton, Essex.

The Stampe SV-4B was later camouflaged and marked 'J7777', then impressed into service with No. 24 Sqn and then No. 510 Sqn, finally marked MX457 and nominally based at RAF Hendon. In 1945, it was returned to its owner Thierry d'Huart in Belgium.

=== RAF service ===
On 26 July 1941, Donnet was accepted by the RAF Volunteer Reserve. On 27 July 1941, with Léon Divoy, he joined No. 61 (OTU) at RAF Heston where as a Pilot Officer he converted to operation of Spitfires. On 7 September 1941, he was briefly posted to No. 143 Squadron RAF.

==== No. 64 Squadron ====
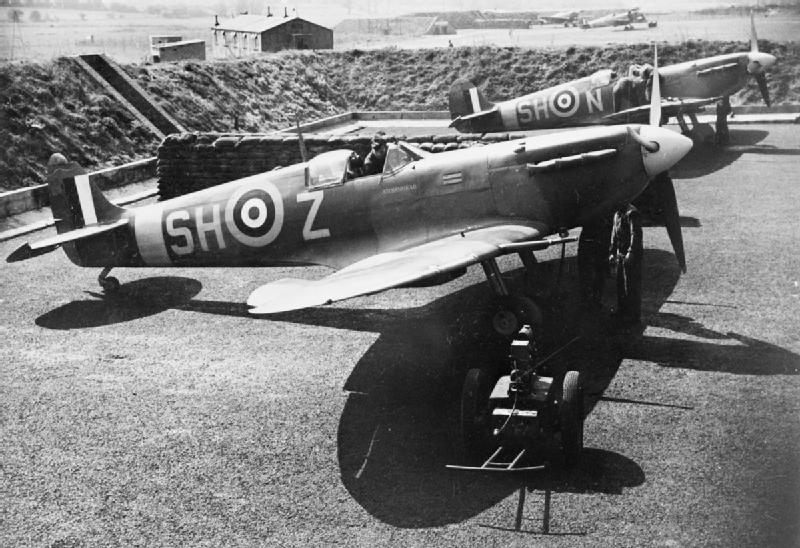
Spitfire VBs of 64 Sqn at Hornchurch

On 15 September 1941, he was posted to 64 Sqn at RAF Turnhouse, flying Spitfire Mk.IIs on patrols and escorting shipping convoys in the North Sea, including some detachments to RAF Drem. On 17 November 1941, the squadron relocated to RAF Hornchurch with Spitfire Mk. Vs. His time there was spent on dogfighting exercises, escort for bomber missions, ground attacks on occupied Belgian airfields, and combat against Focke-Wulf Fw 190s. In April 1942, the squadron moved to RAF Rochford (Southend). On 4 April, he saw his friend Léon Divoy collide with another Spitfire during the same mission; Divoy baled out, and spent the remainder of the war as a POW. Donnet flew further missions against Fw 190s from RAF Hornchurch, and in July 1942 he converted to Spitfire Mk. IXs. On 21 July 1942, he was awarded the Belgian Croix de Guerre, and soon afterwards achieved his first confirmed kill against a Fw 190. On 19 August 1942, he took part in escorting USAAF B-17s during the Dieppe Raid. On 2 September 1942, he was assigned to take over command of 'A' flight of 64 Squadron. On 19 February 1943, he was awarded the DFC (UK), after he had completed 100 sorties. On 26 March 1943, he was promoted to Acting Squadron Leader of 64 Squadron, flying Spitfire Mk. Vs from RAF Ayr, for escort duties and ship deck-landing training. On 7 August 1943, the squadron moved to RAF Friston. On 5 November 1943, he was posted to a Fighter Leaders' course, and then on 19 November 1943 to No. 52 OTU.

==== No. 350 Squadron ====
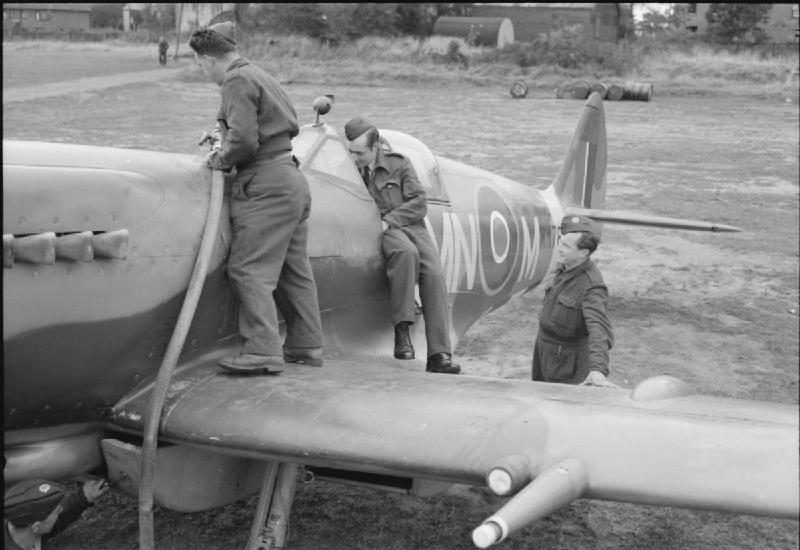
A Spitfire XIV of 350 Sqn at Lympne

On 23 March 1944 Donnet was posted as Squadron Leader of No. 350 Squadron (composed of Belgian pilots), flying Spitfire IXs from RAF Peterhead, then in April from RAF Friston. On 6 June 1944, during the Normandy landings (D-day), he led the squadron in providing continuous fighter cover over the beachhead. In July 1944, the squadron moved to RAF Westhampnett. On 8 August 1944, he moved with the squadron to RAF Hawkinge, flying Spitfire XIVs against V-1 flying bombs. On 3 September 1944, he learned that Belgium had been liberated, and next day he led a celebratory formation of 12 Spitfires over Brussels. On 29 September 1944, the squadron moved to RAF Lympne.

==== Wing commander ====
On 23 October 1944, he was posted as Wing Commander of No. 132 Sqn and No. 441 Sqn at RAF Hawkinge, flying Spitfire IXs. In February 1945, he was posted as Wing Commander of three RAF squadrons, No. 64 Sqn, No. 126 Sqn and No. 234 Sqn at RAF Bentwaters, flying Mustang IIIs on bomber escort duties. In August 1945, he studied at the RAF Staff College. On 21 March 1945, he was posted to RAF Fersfield with No. 64 Sqn and No. 132 Sqn, for escort duties with Mosquitos of No. 140 Wing on Operation Carthage over Copenhagen. During his war period, Donnet flew 375 missions, shot down four enemy aircraft confirmed, and damaged at least another five.

== Postwar ==
After the war, he was posted to the Belgian Ministry of Defense to reorganise the Belgian Air Force, and to update it with aircraft such as Gloster Meteor and Republic F-84. He then led the HQ of No. 83 Group RAF, he became commander of Allied Air Forces Central Europe and then Commander of HQ of RAF Second Tactical Air Force. He took presidency of the direction committee of project NADGE (Integrated NATO Air Defense System) and afterwards became Military Attaché at the Belgian Embassy in London. He was a member of the Military committee of NATO. On 1 July 1975, he retired from the Belgian Air Force as a lieutenant general, having flown over 5,000 hours.

== Military awards and decorations ==

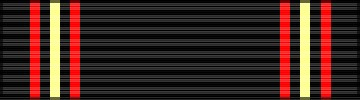

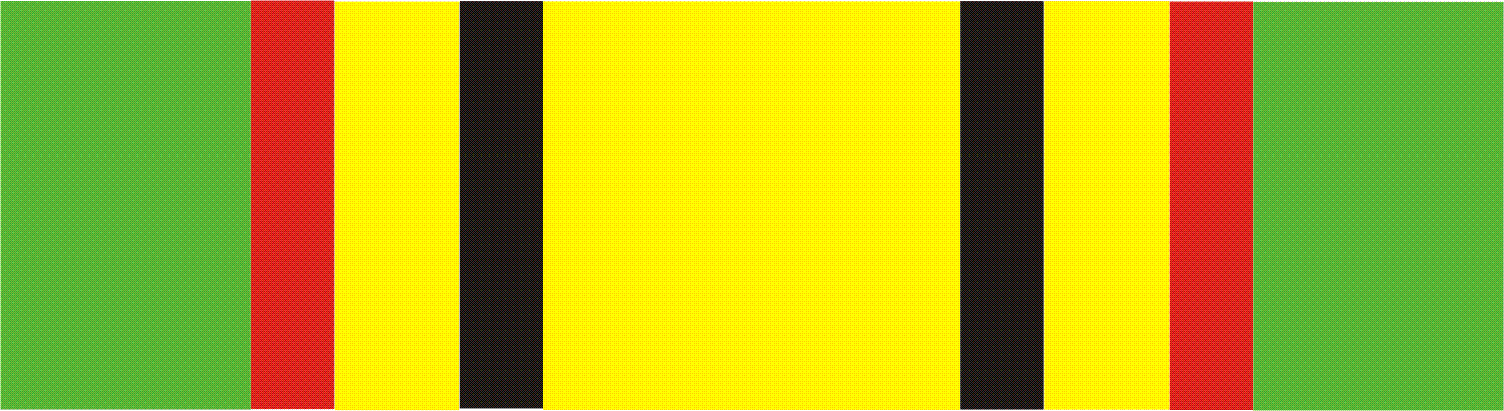

- Grand officer of the order of Leopold with palm
- Grand officer of the order of the crown with palm
- Commander of the royal order of Leopold II
- War cross WWII with 4 palms
- Escaper's cross
- WWII commemorative medal with swords
- Prisoner of war medal
- 1940–1945 Military Combatant's Medal
- Military cross, first class
- Commander of the royal Victorian order (UK)
- Knight of the legion of honor (France)
- Distinguished Flying Cross (UK)
- Air crew Europe star with rosette (UK)
- Atlantic star with rosette (UK)
- 1939–1945 star (UK)
- Defence medal (UK)
- War medal 1939-1945 (UK)
- Medal of a liberated France (France)

== Personal life ==
Michel was a son of Jean Georges Hyacinthe Marie Donnet (1888–1957) and Mariquita Jeanne Françoise Eyben (1891–1979). Jean Donnet was a refrigeration contractor who served in World War One as a volunteer with the Belgian army engineer corps. Michel Donnet married Jacqueline 'Kiki' Gautier (b. 1925). They had four daughters (Anne, Marie, Therese, Claire) and one son (Jean). He died on 31 July 2013, at Waterloo, Belgium.

== Bibliography ==
- Donnet, Michel. 1968. (in French). J'ai Volé la Liberté : 1940 – 1945. Editions Arts et Voyages
- Donnet, Michael. 1974. Flight to Freedom. Ian Allan ISBN 0711005672
- Donnet, Mike and Branders, Leon. 1979, 1991. (in French). Ils en étaient! Les Escadrilles Belges de la RAF. Les Presses de l'Avenir
- Donnet, Mike. 1994. (in French). Envols Pour La Liberté. Editions Racine ISBN 2873860200
- Donnet, Mike. 1997. (in French). 50 ans d'Aviation Militaire. Musée Royal de l'Armée
- Donnet, Mike. 2001. (in French). Lucien Jansen un Héros du XXe Siècle. Editions Racine ISBN 2873862440
- Donnet, Mike. 2007. (in French). Les Aviateurs Belges dans la Royal Air Force. Editions Racine ISBN 978-2-87386-472-9
- Halley, James J. 1980. The Squadrons of the Royal Air Force. Air-Britain (Historians) Ltd ISBN 0-85130-083-9
