= Remy Van Lierde =

Belgian fighter pilot (1915–1990)

- Born: 14 August 1915; Overboelare, Belgium
- Died: 8 June 1990 (aged 74); Lessines, Belgium
- Military career
- Allegiance: Belgium; United Kingdom
- Branch: Belgian Army (1935–40); Royal Air Force (1940–46); Belgian Air Force (1946–68)
- Service years: 1935–1968
- Rank: Colonel
- Commands: Chièvres Air Base; Kamina Air Base; 7th Fighter Wing; 1st Fighter Wing; No. 350 (Belgian) Squadron RAF; No. 164 Squadron RAF
- Conflicts: Second World War
- Awards: Distinguished Flying Cross & Two Bars

Colonel Remy Van Lierde, DFC & Two Bars (14 August 1915 – 8 June 1990) was a Belgian pilot and fighter ace who served in the aviation branch of the Belgian Army and the British Royal Air Force (RAF) during the Second World War, shooting down six enemy aircraft and 44 V-1 flying bombs, and achieving the RAF rank of squadron leader. Returning to the Belgian Air Force in 1946, Van Lierde was made Deputy Chief of Staff to the Minister of Defense in 1954. In 1958 he became one of the first Belgians to break the sound barrier while test flying a Hawker Hunter at Dunsfold Aerodrome in England. He went on to hold several important commands before retiring in 1968.

He is also known for purportedly sighting a giant snake in the Katanga region of the Belgian Congo.

== Early life ==
Van Lierde was born in Overboelare, Belgium, on 14 August 1915.

== Early career and outbreak of war ==
Van Lierde entered the Aviation Militaire Belge ("Belgian Military Aviation", the predecessor of the Belgian Air Force) on 16 September 1935. He first trained as an observer, but began pilot training on 1 May 1937, qualifying in April 1938. He was assigned to the 3rd Squadron, 1st Aviation Regiment. The 3rd Squadron where Remy Van Lierde served at that time was located at Goetsenhoven, in the centre of Belgium.

With the rank of sergeant, Van Lierde made several reconnaissance flights during the German invasion in an antiquated Fairey Fox III biplane. He was shot down by flak on 16 May 1940, was wounded and captured. Van Lierde was staying in hospital during two weeks and could not take part in the further fighting because on 28 May Belgium surrendered.

In September 1940, after recovering from his injuries, Van Lierde left Belgium, crossed occupied France, and entered neutral Spain. He was arrested for illegally crossing the border, and was confined in various Spanish prisons, including the notorious concentration camp at Miranda de Ebro. Nevertheless, he eventually escaped, and reached England on 22 July 1941.

=== Career in the Royal Air Force ===
After the standard interrogation by MI5 at the London Reception Centre, Van Lierde joined the Royal Air Force Volunteer Reserve on 5 September 1941. He spent three months at No. 57 Operational Training Unit at RAF Hawarden, before being assigned to No. 609 Squadron on 6 January 1942 with the rank of pilot officer. This squadron, which had been organized before the war and took part in the Battle of Britain, was entirely staffed by foreign pilots, many Belgians being among them. On 2 June 1942 Van Lierde damaged a Dornier Do 217 bomber over Skegness while flying a Spitfire Mk.Vb. He was promoted to flying officer in 1942.

Van Lierde claimed his first victory while flying a Typhoon Ib on 20 January 1943 when he shot down a Bf 109-G fighter during a raid on the south coast. On 26 March he shot down a Junkers Ju 52 transport aircraft while en route to an attack on the German air base at Chièvres. This was witnessed by local inhabitants, including Van Lierde's wife, who surprised her husband after the war by showing him pieces of wreckage from the aircraft at the bottom of his garden. On 14 May 1943 he was the first person to drop bombs from a Typhoon, and shot down a He 111 bomber on his return journey. He downed another Bf 109 on 30 July, and on 5 October he shot down a Junkers Ju 88 heavy fighter and destroyed another aircraft on the ground. His last victory, a Messerschmitt Bf 110 bomber was claimed on 30 November, bringing his score to 6 kills and 1 destroyed on the ground. By the end of 1943 he was the seventh highest scoring Belgian flying ace of the war.

Van Lierde was promoted to flight lieutenant in September 1943 and, on 22 December, was posted to the Central Gunnery School at RAF Sutton Bridge, Lincolnshire, returning to RAF Manston on 7 February 1944. On 27 April, he was posted to No. 3 Squadron, flying the Tempest Mk.V, before taking command of No. 164 Squadron on 20 August with the rank of squadron leader, tasked with combating the V-1 offensive. He was credited with shooting down or destroying 44 flying bombs solo, with another 9 shared, making him the second highest-scoring "doodlebug" killer.

Van Lierde then led his squadron into Europe during the western campaign. From May 1945 Van Lierde served in 84 Group Support Unit, and as a Belgian Liaison Officer at Second Tactical Air Force Headquarters.

== Post-war service ==
In August 1945 Van Lierde was given command of No. 350 (Belgian) Squadron, an RAF formation of Belgian pilots flying the Spitfire that was eventually transferred to the Belgian Air Force in October 1946.

Commissioned into the Belgian Air Force as a major in June 1946, Van Lierde took command of the 1st Fighter Wing (formed from No. 350 and 349 Squadrons) at Beauvechain Air Base. From October 1947 to November 1950 he was head of the Office of Group Operations, and also studied at the RAF Staff College in 1948. He was appointed Detachment Commander at Chièvres Air Base, and then on 1 December 1950 as commander of the 7th Fighter Wing. In 1953 he was appointed to the Operations Group of Chiefs of Staff. Van Lierde was appointed aide to the former King Leopold III in September 1953.

In November 1958, with Captain Yves Bodart, Van Lierde travelled to England to test fly a Hawker Hunter at Dunsfold Aerodrome, becoming one of the first Belgian pilots to break the sound barrier.

Lieutenant Colonel Van Lierde was made Deputy Chief of Staff to the Minister of Defense in 1954. In 1959, as full colonel, he commanded the air base at Kamina in the Belgian Congo. After the Belgian Congo became independent on 30 June 1960, Van Lierde returned to Belgium and became the Chief of Operations of the Chiefs of Staff and had several other appointments before his retirement in 1968.

Van Lierde died at Lessines on 8 June 1990.

== Alleged encounter with a giant snake ==
Photograph taken by Van Lierde's companion.

On an episode of Arthur C. Clarke's Mysterious World entitled "Dragons, Dinosaurs and Giant Snakes", Van Lierde recounted that in 1959 he encountered a giant snake in the Katanga region of the Belgian Congo while returning to Kamina Air Base from a mission by helicopter. He reported having then turned around and made several passes over the snake to allow another person on board to photograph the creature.

Van Lierde described the snake as being close to 50 feet (15 m) in length, with a circumference of 1.48 feet (45 cm). Van Lierde claimed it to be a dark shade of brown and green with a white coloured belly with a head measuring 3 feet (0.91 m) long and 2 feet (0.61 m) wide, and that the jaws were of a triangular shape.

Additionally, he claimed that as he flew lower for a closer inspection, the snake rose up approximately 10 feet (3.0 m), giving the impression it would have attacked the helicopter if it had been within striking range.

== See also ==
- List of World War II aces from Belgium
