= Maurice Balasse =

Belgian military pilot and flying ace

- Born: 27 June 1914
- Died: 23 January 1945 (aged 30)
- Military career
- Allegiance: Belgium; United Kingdom
- Branch: Belgian Army (1934–40); Royal Air Force (1942–45)
- Service years: 1934–1945
- Rank: Flight Lieutenant
- Unit: No. 41 Squadron
- Conflicts: Second World War: Operation Diver

Flight Lieutenant Maurice Arthur Leon Balasse (27 June 1914 – 23 January 1945) was a Belgian military pilot and flying ace who served in the British Royal Air Force (RAF) during the Second World War. He shot down six V-1 flying bombs in 1944 before he was shot down and killed over Germany early the following year while serving with No. 41 Squadron. He is buried in the Belgian Airmen's Field of Honour at the Brussels Cemetery.

== Bibliography ==
- Besnard, Frédèric (December 1999). "Courrier des Lecteurs" [Readers' Letters]. Avions: Toute l'aéronautique et son histoire (in French) (81): 2. ISSN 1243-8650.
- Martin, Pierre (September 1999). "Maurice Balasse, un as belge de la chasse aux V-1" [Maurice Balasse, a Belgian V-1 Hunting Ace]. Avions: Toute l'Aéronautique et Son Histoire (in French) (78): 36–47. ISSN 1243-8650.
