= 349th Squadron (Belgium) =

No. 349 (Belgian) Squadron RAF 349th Squadron
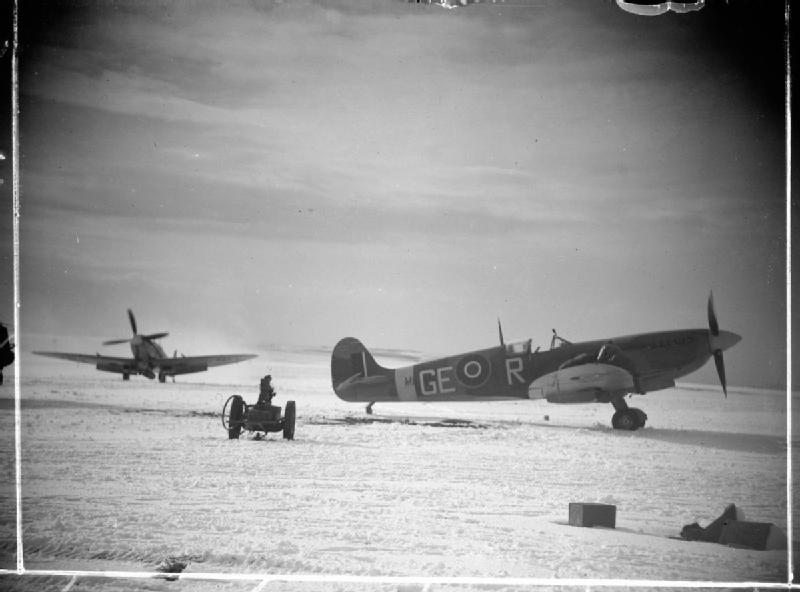
- Spitfire Mark IXCs of No. 349 (Belgian) Squadron, 1943-4.
- Active: 10 November 1942 - May 1943; 5 June 1943 - 24 October 1946; 1946 – present
- Country: Belgium
- Branch: Belgian Air Force; Royal Air Force (1941–1946)
- Part of: 10th Tactical Wing
- Mottos: Strike Hard, Strike Home
- Fighter: F-16 Fighting Falcon

Commanders
- Notable commanders: Raymond Lallemant; Frank De Winne

Insignia
- Squadron Badge: Two morning stars in saltire
- Squadron Codes: GE (Jan 1943 - Oct 1946)

349th Squadron (French: 349^{e} escadrille, Dutch: 349^{ste} Smaldeel) is a fighter squadron in the Belgian Air Force of the Belgian Armed Forces. The squadron traces its origins to No. 349 (Belgian) Squadron of the Royal Air Force, founded in 1942 as part of the Free Belgian forces during World War II. It was transferred to the re-established Belgian Air Force in 1946, together with 350th Squadron. Considered an "honorary" squadron, it retained its original name and numbering and has been flying under the Belgian flag ever since. Today it is part of the 10th Tactical Wing, operating the F-16 Fighting Falcon from Kleine Brogel airbase.

== History ==
=== Royal Air Force (1942–46) ===
No 349 (Belgian) Squadron was formed as a Royal Air Force squadron by Belgian personnel at RAF Ikeja (near Lagos), Nigeria on 10 November 1942. The squadron was equipped with the Curtiss Tomahawk for local defence duties but the squadron did not become operational as such. The pilots were used for ferrying aircraft to the Middle East instead. The squadron was disbanded in May 1943 and the personnel transferred to the UK. On 5 June 1943, the Squadron was reformed at RAF Station Wittering, operating the Supermarine Spitfire V. After a brief stay at RAF Kings Cliffe during July 1943, the squadron became operational at RAF Digby in August 1943. The squadron moved to southern England to operate over France as bomber escorts and low-level sweeps. In early 1944, it began training as a fighter-bomber unit and then operated as such in occupied Europe. During the invasion of Normandy, it carried out beachhead patrols and were used as bomber escorts. In August 1944 the squadron moved to France, in the fighter-bomber role, and carried out armed reconnaissance behind enemy positions, attacking targets of opportunity (mainly vehicles). In February 1945, the squadron returned to England to convert to the Hawker Tempest. This did not go well: conversion ended in April, and the squadron reacquired Spitfire IXs, operating from the Netherlands. It moved to Belgium and was disbanded as an RAF-squadron on 24 October 1946 on transfer to the Belgian Air Force, keeping the number. The last Belgian pilot to fly for the original 349th squadron during D-day, Joseph Moureau, died in 2020 at the age of 99. During the second world war a total of 521 Belgian officers served in the RAF, suffering 128 loses.

==== Aircraft operated during RAF service ====
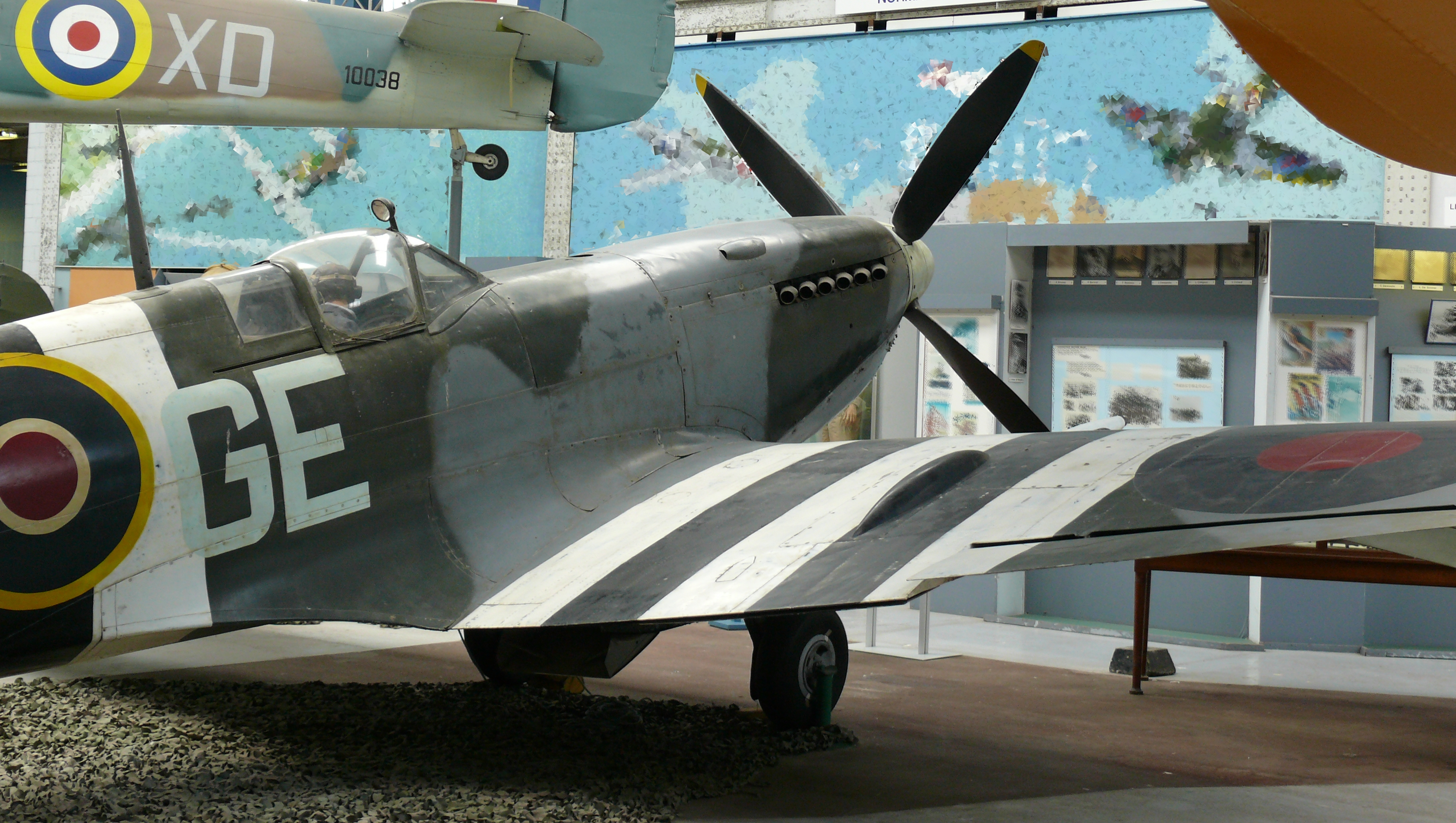
Spitfire Mk IX in the markings of No. 349 Squadron at the Royal Museum of the Armed Forces in Brussels.

Aircraft operated by No. 349 Squadron
From	To	Aircraft	Variant	Notes
Jan 1943	Apr 1943	Curtiss Tomahawk	Mk.I	
Jun 1943	Feb 1944	Supermarine Spitfire	Mk.V	
Feb 1944	Feb 1945	Supermarine Spitfire	LF.IXe	
Feb 1945	Apr 1945	Hawker Tempest	Mk.V	
Apr 1945	May 1945	Supermarine Spitfire	Mk.IXb	
May 1945	Oct 1946	Supermarine Spitfire	LF.XVIe	

==== Commanding officers ====
Commanding officers No. 349 Squadron
From	To	Name
Jan 1943	Jul 1944	Sqn Ldr Ivan du Monceau de Bergendael, DFC & Bar, CdG
Jul 1944	Mar 1945	Sqn Ldr Albert Van der Velde, DFC, Escapees' Cross 1940–1945, Croix de guerre (Belgium), Croix de Guerre (Luxembourg)
Mar 1945	Dec 1945	Sqn Ldr Raymond "Cheval" Lallemant, DFC & Bar
Dec 1945	Oct 1946	Sqn Ldr Albert Van der Velde,

=== Belgian Air Force (1946 to present) ===
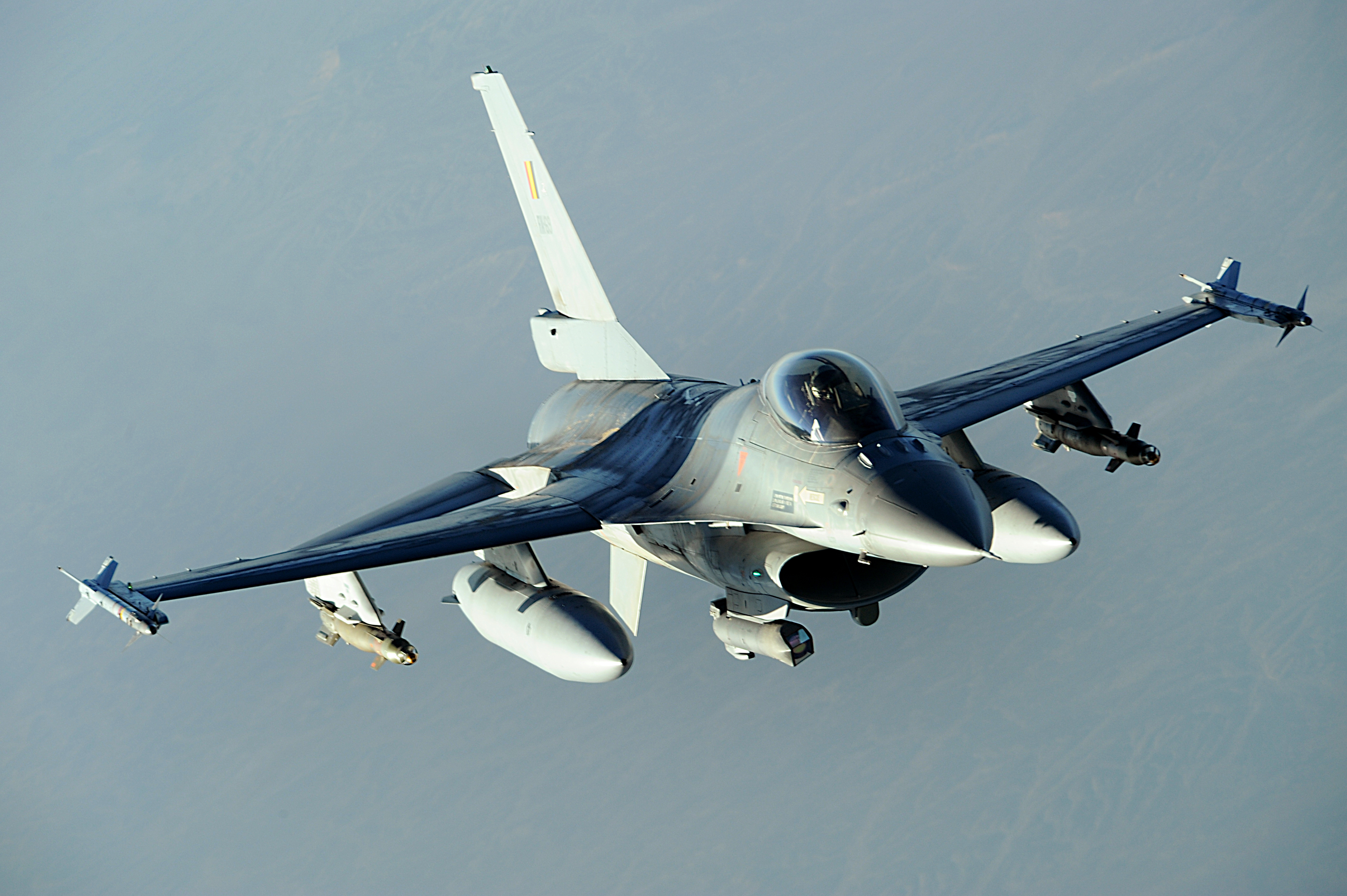
Belgian F-16 Fighting Falcon of 349th Squadron

In 1946, the unit was integrated in the Belgian Air Force. From 1998, the unit was commanded by future Belgian astronaut Frank De Winne.

From 1957 to 1964, the squadron operated the Avro Canada CF-100 Canuck.

In 1999, the squadron participated in the NATO bombing of Yugoslavia. In 2004, it was the first squadron to be deployed to Šiauliai airbase, Lithuania in the context of the Baltic Air Policing operation. In 2005 and 2008 it was deployed to Kabul as part of the ISAF mission in Afghanistan. In 2011, it was part of Operation Unified Protector during the Libyan civil war.

349th Sqn was the first operational F-16 squadron in NATO.
