= Monceau Castle =

Monceau Castle (French: Château de Monceau) can refer to a château in the following places in Belgium:

- Château de Monceau, Monceau-sur-Sambre, city of Charleroi, province of Hainaut
- Château de Monceau, Monceau-Imbrechies, municipality of Momignies, province of Hainaut
- Château de Monceau, Juseret, municipality of Vaux-sur-Sûre, province of Luxembourg
