= Terry Spencer (RAF officer) =

English RAF officer (1918–2009)

Terence Spencer
- Born: 18 March 1918; Bedford, England
- Died: 8 February 2009 (aged 90); Odiham, Hampshire, England
- Military career
- Allegiance: United Kingdom
- Branch: British Army; Royal Air Force
- Service years: 1939–1946
- Rank: Squadron Leader
- Nickname: Terry
- Conflicts: Second World War
- Awards: Distinguished Flying Cross; Territorial Efficiency Medal; Croix de Guerre (Belgium)
- Other work: Aerial photography, war photographer

Terence Spencer, DFC (18 March 1918 – 8 February 2009) was a Royal Air Force fighter pilot and flying ace of the Second World War, and later a war photographer for Life magazine.

== Early life ==
Terence Spencer was born on 8 March 1918 during a Zeppelin raid in Bedford, England, the son of an engineering company owner. Educated at Cheltenham College, Spencer took an engineering degree at the University of Birmingham.

== Military career ==
On graduation, Spencer joined the Royal Warwickshire Regiment, and then transferred to the Royal Engineers, commissioned from acting lance corporal to second lieutenant on 20 December 1939.

In February 1941, due to the losses of pilots during the Battle of Britain, an Army Council Instruction was issued to state that British Army personnel could apply to transfer to the Royal Air Force (RAF), which 18,000 officers took up.

=== RAF service ===
Spencer transferred to the Royal Air Force Volunteer Reserve (RAFVR) and was commissioned on 10 October 1941 (RAF No. 47269). He completed his entire flying training in the United Kingdom, and was a flying officer by the time of his posting to his first operational unit, No. 26 Squadron RAF at Gatwick, in November 1942.

In June 1943, Spencer was promoted to Flight Commander of the unit, and four months later to flight lieutenant. Having spent 15 months with No. 26 Squadron, he was posted to No. 165 (Ceylon) Squadron at Culmhead as a Flight Commander at the beginning of February 1944, flying Spitfire IXs.

Spencer was posted to No. 41 Squadron RAF as Officer Commanding A Flight, on 28 May 1944, where he flew Supermarine Spitfire Mk. XIIs. Between 23 June and 28 August 1944, he claimed seven V-1 flying bombs destroyed, but an eighth is also recorded in his logbook that did not make it to the official records. One of these he succeeded in destroying by tipping it up with the wing of his aircraft, an event sketched into his logbook by fellow pilot and amateur artist, Flight Lieutenant Tom Slack, who titled the drawing "Tip 'em Up Terry".

In early September 1944, Spencer led a section of four pilots on an armed reconnaissance over Belgium where they encountered two of the Luftwaffe's highest-scoring aces, Emil "Bully" Lang, the Commanding Officer of II/JG26 (173 victories), and Alfred Gross (52 victories), in FW190s over Tirlemont. Although one of his section was killed, the two aces were shot down, Lang killed and Gross so seriously wounded that he did not return to service before the end of the war.

In November, Spencer led No. 41 Squadron's advance party to Diest, arriving in Belgium almost a month ahead of the rest of the unit. He then returned to RAF Lympne to brief the Squadron on conditions at their first continental base of the war.

Promoted to squadron leader, Spencer was posted to No. 350 (Belgian) Squadron on 4 January 1945. On 26 February, he was hit by flak in the Rheine-Lingen area of Germany and captured. Just over a month later, when the camp's main gate was left open, he escaped by bicycle, and subsequently motorcycle, with another ex-No. 41 Squadron pilot, Squadron Leader K. F. "Jimmy" Thiele, in a Steve-McQueen-style getaway, in which the pair made it back to Allied lines.

Rejoining No. 350 Squadron, Spencer resumed command between 2 and 19 April 1945. On this latter date, he was shot down, this time by rocket fire while strafing a trawler in Wismar Bay. He succeeded in baling out and deploying his parachute at a height of just 30 feet (9.1 m), which he miraculously survived, only to be captured again. The successful jump has since been credited by the Guinness Book of Records as having been the lowest authenticated survived bail-out on record.

Spencer was injured and hospitalised, but liberated by advancing Allied armies approximately two weeks later. Spencer was awarded an immediate Distinguished Flying Cross (DFC) for his exploits and, in 1947, was also awarded the Territorial Efficiency Medal and the Belgian Croix de Guerre with Palm.

The citation for his DFC on 22 June 1945 read:

This officer's keenness for air operations has won great praise. He has completed a very large number of sorties and has invariably attacked his targets with great courage and determination thereby achieving much success. On one occasion in February 1945, Squadron Leader Spencer was forced to come down in enemy territory. He was captured, but subsequently rejoined his unit. He has been responsible for the destruction of one enemy, aircraft and a good number of mechanical vehicles.

=== Combat Record ===
Date	Service	Flying	Victories	Unit	Notes
23 June 1944	RAF	Spitfire	1 * V-1	41 Sqn	10 miles NNE of Hastings, Sussex
25 June 1944	RAF	Spitfire	1 * V-1	41 Sqn	Over Hastings, Sussex
9 August 1944	RAF	Spitfire	1 * V-1	41 Sqn	5 miles NE of Hastings
19 August 1944	RAF	Spitfire	1 * V-1	41 Sqn	2m NNW of Appledore, Kent
23 August 1944	RAF	Spitfire	1 * V-1	41 Sqn	2m N of Mersham, Kent
23 August 1944	RAF	Spitfire	1 * V-1	41 Sqn	Near Harrietsham, Kent
27 August 1944	RAF	Spitfire	1 * V-1	41 Sqn	15m N of Rye, Sussex
3 September 1944	RAF	Spitfire	1 * FW-190A-5	41 Sqn	Overhespen, Belgium (Hptm Emil 'Bully' Lang, Stab II./JG26 †)
19 April 1945	RAF	Spitfire	1 * Ju 88	350 Sqn	Destroyed on ground, Lauenburg, Germany

== Photographic career ==
In February 1946, after being demobilised, Spencer was asked by the Percival Aircraft Company to ferry solo a Percival Proctor, a small single-engine plane, without radio, dinghy or emergency supplies, on an 8,000 miles (13,000 km) flight to South Africa.

Based outside Johannesburg, Spencer and his wife started a successful aerial photography business based around a Piper Cub. In 1952, he started shooting for Life magazine, covering war stories in African continent, including Sharpville and the Congo Crisis, many of the independence struggles in emerging African nations, the horrors of apartheid, Nelson Mandela on the run and Jomo Kenyatta in detention.

In 1962 Spencer returned to England to photograph "Swinging London". While there, at the request of his daughter Cara, Spencer followed the (at the time largely unknown) band The Beatles, and documented them for several months and shooting more than 5,000 pictures. It resulted in a definitive pictorial book on the band It Was 30 Years Ago Today. Commissioned by Life to shoot in other war torn locations, he covered the Vietnam War, crises in the Middle East, Indonesia, and Cuba after the Bay of Pigs Invasion.

Spencer's work with the Beatles, in particular, resulted in him shooting celebrity stories for People magazine, the originals and classification of which were stored in the libraries of Rockarchive, although the copyright has since passed to Spencer's daughters. His subjects included celebrities such as Freddie Mercury, Bob Dylan, Ava Gardner, Katharine Hepburn, Princess Grace of Monaco, Richard Branson, and John Cleese.

== Personal life ==
Spencer met the English actress Lesley Brook on a blind date, and they were married in 1947. The couple had two daughters, and a son died in infancy. Spencer died in hospital in Odiham, Hampshire of cancer, aged 90, less than 24 hours after his wife of 62 years died.

In 2002, Spencer and Brook co-authored a book about their lives, titled Living Dangerously (Percival). Although the original is out of print, his daughters released an updated edition on 27 June 2012. The book's (re-)release coincided with the launch of a website of Spencer's archive of photographs taken whilst working for Life, Time and People magazines.

== Publications ==
+ Letter to Lt. Col. Robert K. Brown. Soldier of Fortune, vol. 1, no. 3 (Summer 1976), p. 6.
