= Yves du Monceau de Bergendal =

Yvan du Monceau de Bergendal
- Born: 10 December 1915; London, United Kingdom
- Died: 9 November 1984 (aged 68); Brussels, Belgium
- Military career
- Allegiance: Belgium
- Branch: Belgian Air Component
- Service years: 1936–1971
- Rank: Major General
- Conflicts: World War II

Comte Yvan du Monceau de Bergendal (10 December 1915 – 10 December 1984) was a Belgian aviator and World War II flying ace.

== Bibliography ==
- Terlinden, Michel & Cony, Christophe (July 2001). ""Duke" du Monceau". Avions: Toute l'Aéronautique et son histoire (in French) (100): 35–39. ISSN 1243-8650.
