= Tactical Leadership Programme =

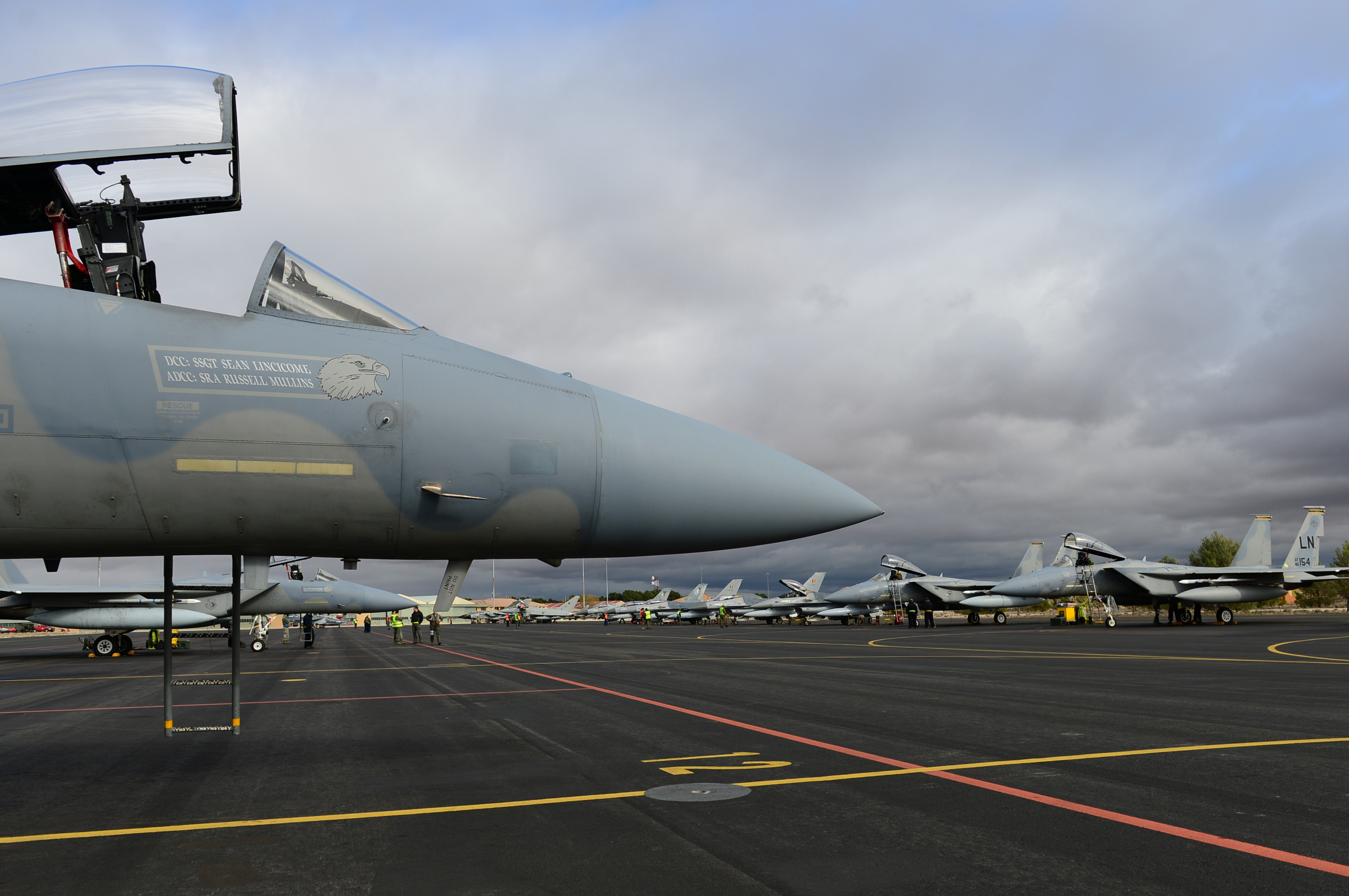
United States Air Force F-15C in the TLP (Albacete, Spain).

TLP, in English and officially Tactical Leadership Programme, also known as the Pilot School of NATO, is an international military organization formed by 10 permanent member countries (Belgium, Denmark, France, Germany, Greece, Italy, Netherlands, Spain, United Kingdom and United States), the rest of the countries of NATO and the invited countries from outside NATO.

It is a multinational center of advanced training for aircrews (pilots and navigators) with the aim of improving the operability and effectiveness of the Allied Air Forces. In addition to the flight training courses (both day and night), theoretical courses are also developed for personnel from the three armies of both NATO and non-NATO countries. elaboration of the aerial doctrine. It has its seat in the Spanish city of Albacete next to the Los Llanos Air Base.
