= 5th Squadron (Belgium) =

5th squadron
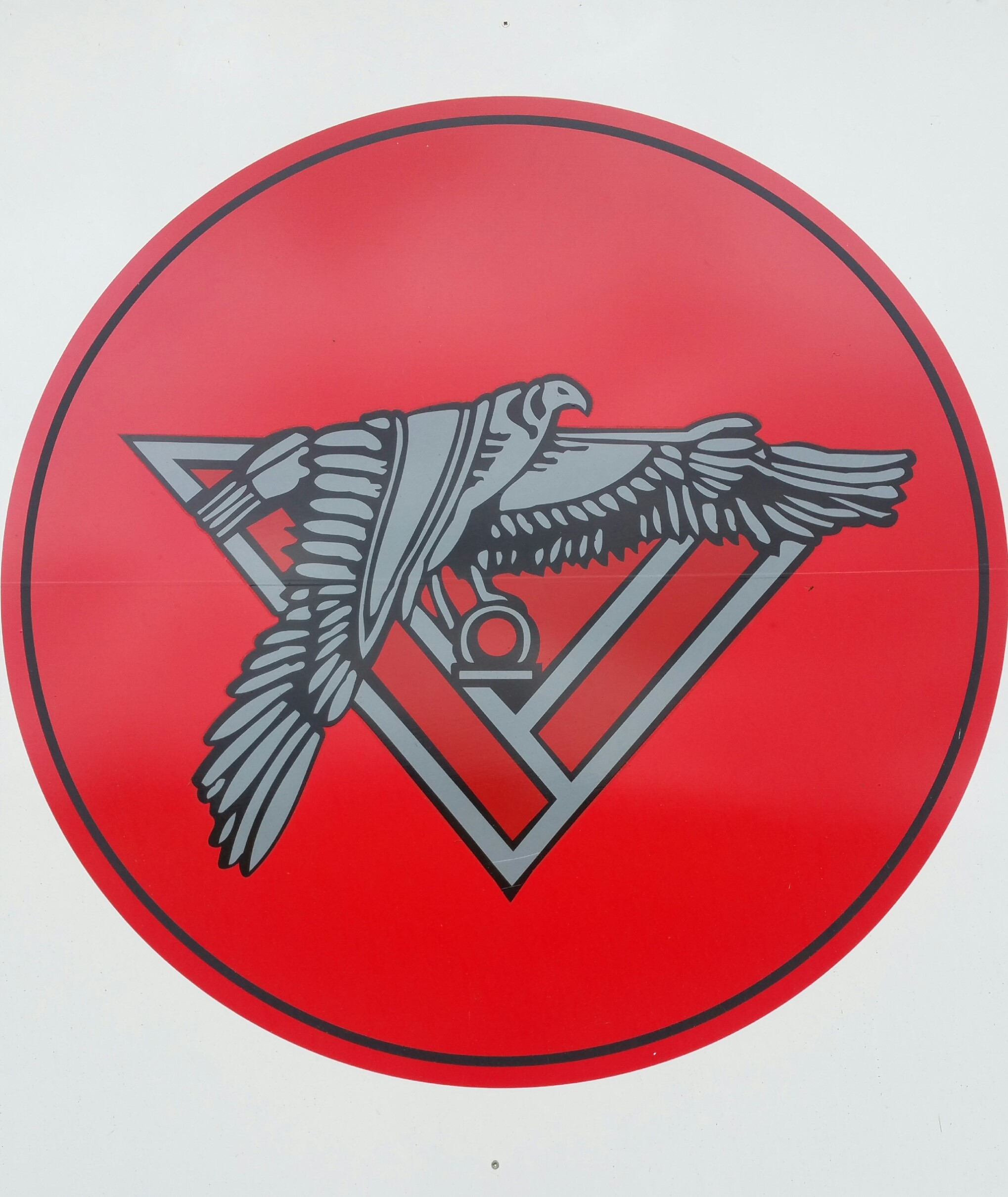
- Emblem of the 5th squadron.
- Active: 30 September 1935
- Country: Belgium
- Allegiance: Belgian Armed Forces
- Branch: Belgian Air Component
- Role: Instruction
- Part of: Basic Flying Training School
- Garrison/HQ: Beauvechain Air Base

Aircraft flown
- Trainer: SF260

The 5th squadron (Dutch: 5de Smaldeel, French: 5e escadrille) is a training squadron which, together with the 9th squadron, forms the Basic Flying Training School of the Belgian Air Component.

== History ==
=== Origin ===
The 5th squadron of the 3rd group of the 3rd aeronautical regiment (5/III/3Aé) was created on 30 September 1935. Parked at the Evere base, it is equipped with Fairey Fox biplanes. In early 1938, it was transformed on Fairey Battle. It was with these aircraft that the squadron entered the Second World War and aviation history by attacking the bridges of the Albert Canal. This almost suicidal mission caused the loss of six of the nine aircraft and almost as many crew members, but it testifies to the Belgian airmen's abnegation in the face of the invader.

=== Captain Charles de Hepcée ===
Captain Charles de Hepcée was then the Commander of the 5th Squadron. After the surrender of the Belgian army on 28 May 1940, Captain de Hepcée distinguished himself in important activities of resistance, intelligence and escape from the continent. It was on one of these clandestine missions in occupied territory that he was arrested on 13 April 1944 and shot on 27 June 1944 by an SS firing squad near Castelmaurou in the Toulouse region. We then lose track of Charles de Hepcée. Thanks to arduous international research, his remains were finally identified 68 years later. Charles de Hepcée was buried in the family grave of Halloy (Belgium) on 24 July 2012.

=== Emblem ===
The 5th Squadron emblem depicts a red and silver Egyptian falcon encroaching on a magic ring, referring to the battle of Horus, god of airspace, against Set. The Falcon appeared in 1932 on the aircraft of the 9th squadron of the 5th Observation Group of the 1st Aeronautical Regiment based at that time on the Evere aerodrome. In 1935, the badge was transferred to the newly created 5th Reconnaissance Squadron. The Egyptian falcon disappeared in the turmoil of the war and was reborn in 1947 when it was attributed to the very young Brustem Advanced Pilot School (Ecole de pilotage avancée - EPA) that it followed in Kamina. After Congo's independence, the EPA returned to Brustem and in 1962 it was integrated into the training centre, whose flight group took the falcon as its emblem. When the training centre was dissolved in 1984, the Egyptian falcon and the traditions of the 5/III/3Aé were transferred to the flight training squadron of the Elementary Pilot School (EPE) of Gossoncourt that later became the 5th squadron. The Falcon is now proudly displayed on the left side of the SIAI Marchetti SF.260.

=== Beauvechain ===
In November 1996, the 5th squadron, equipped with SIAI Marchetti SF.260, left Gossoncourt for good and settled in Beauvechain within the 1st Wing. After a further reorganisation of the Belgian armed forces, the Agusta A.109 helicopters of the heli wing, based in Bierset, moved to Beauvechain on 1 September 2010. The names and traditions of the 1st Wing were transferred to the heli wing. Together, the 9th and 5th Squadron currently form the Basic Flying Training School. Still based in Beauvechain, this school has been independent of the heli wing since its transformation in 2010.

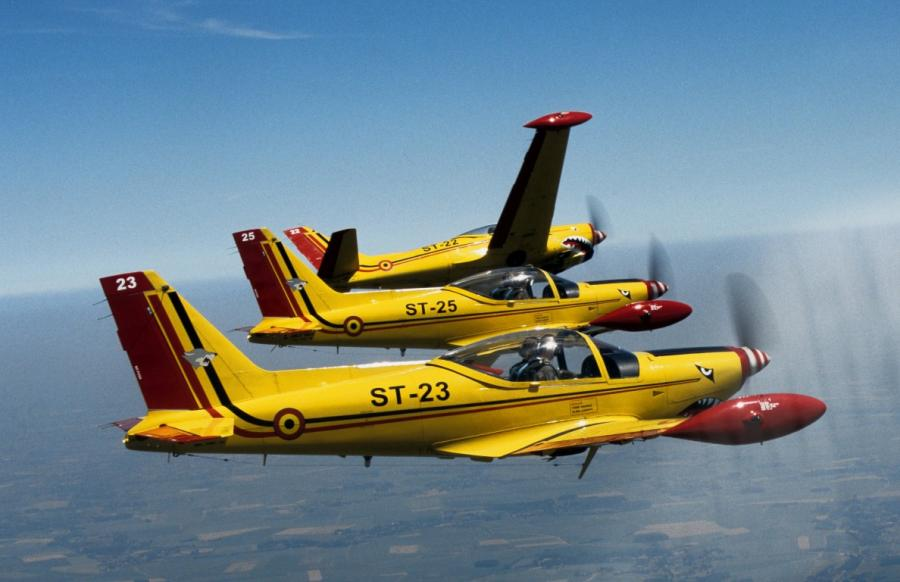
Belgian Air Force SF260M.

== Training ==
Today, the mission of the 5th Squadron is to train student pilots in basic flying. This learning phase designated as Phase II includes four subjects that each student pilot must complete before moving on to Phase III in another unit. These four disciplines include general flight, instrument flight, navigation flight and formation flight. The 5th Squadron is also responsible for selecting student pilots to be sent to the Euro-NATO Joint Jet Pilot Training Program (ENJJPT) in the United States to continue their Phase III on Beechcraft T-6 Texan II. The SIAI Marchetti SF.260, commonly known as "Marchetti", is the training device used by the 5th Squadron to carry out its mission. This Italian-made single-engine aircraft, designed by engineer Stelio Frati, offers great versatility and is perfectly suited to the various basic learning disciplines. The training instructors of the 5th squadron are experienced pilots trained within STANEVAL. These pilots come from different backgrounds such as fighter squadrons, transport and helicopters. Some of these instructors are also members of the Red Devils Acrobatic team.

== Commanding officers ==
- Maj Vl Peter Blockland: 1996–1998
- Maj Avi Jean Vanhecke: 1998–2000
- Maj Avi Stéphane Pierre: 2000–2002
- Maj Vl Werner Desiron: 2002–2005
- Maj Avi Michel Van Buggenhout: 2005–2008
- Maj Avi Jean-François Balon: 2008–2010
- Lt-Col Avi Michel Borlée: 2011–2014
- Maj Vl Mike Depreitere: 2014–2017
- Maj Vl Sam Van der Linden: 2017–2019
- Maj Vl Kevin Bourdiaudhy: 2019–2022
- Maj Vl Kris Hendrickx: 2022–2023
- Maj Avi Julien Pelletier: 2023–2025
- Maj Vl Karen Vandenbroucke: 2026–Present

== See also ==
- 9 Squadron (Belgium)
- Belgian Air Component

== Sources ==
- Serge Van Heertum - Marc Arys SIAI MARCHETTI Agile penguins in Belgian Skies. Editions FLASH AVIATION (2009)
- Champagne, Jacques P. & Detournay, Gaston L. Blasons Familiers d'une Chevalerie Nouvelle. Editions CARACTERE – Arlon
- Les ailes militaires belges
- Les vieilles tiges de l'aviation belge asbl
- La Défense
- theaerodrome.com
