= Basic Flying Training School =

Basic Flying Training School may refer to:

- Australian Defence Force Basic Flying Training School, a unit of the Royal Australian Air Force
- Basic Flying Training School (Belgian Air Component), a unit of the Belgian Air Component
- Basic Flying Training School (India), a training institute of the Indian Air Force
