= 18th Squadron (Belgium) =

- Country: Belgium
- Branch: Belgian Air Force
- Role: Helicopter
- Part of: 1st Wing
- Garrison/HQ: Beauvechain Air Base

The 18th Squadron (French: 18^{e} escadrille, Dutch: 18^{ste} Smaldeel) is a helicopter squadron in the Belgian Air Force of the Belgian Armed Forces which operated the NHIndustries NH90 TTH until September 2025.
