= Belgian Air Force =

Aviation branch of Belgian Armed Forces

- Luchtmacht (Dutch); Force aérienne (French)
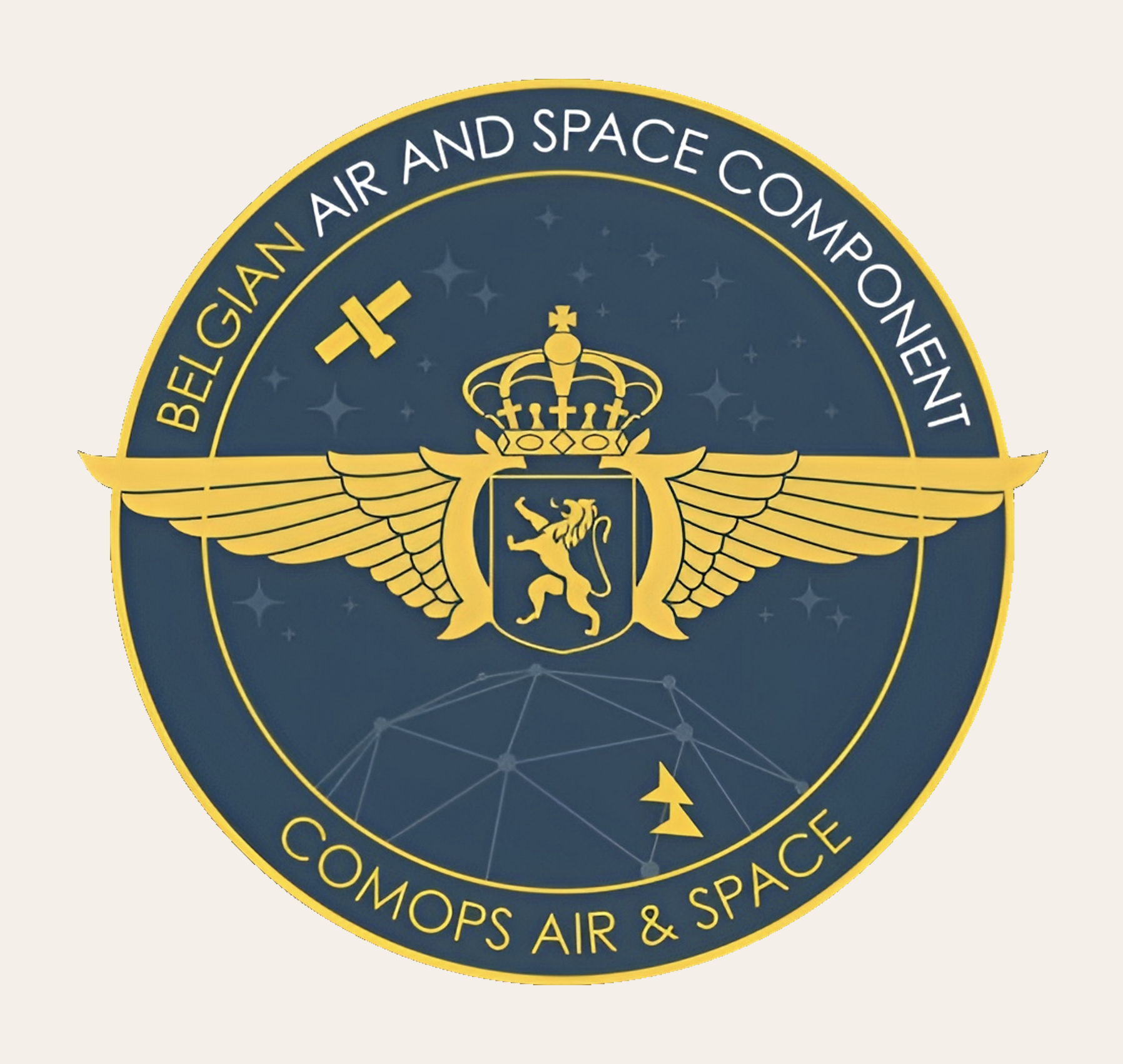
- Logo of the Air and Space forces
- Founded: 1909
- Country: Belgium
- Branch: Air force
- Type: Air force
- Role: Aerial warfare
- Size: 5700 (2025); 106 aircraft
- Part of: Belgian Armed Forces
- March: March of the air forces
- Website: www.mil.be

Commanders
- Current commander: Major General Geert De Decker

Insignia
- Roundel

- Fin flash

- Ensign

Aircraft flown
- Fighter: F-16A, F-35A
- Helicopter: A109BA, H145M, NH90 NFH
- Reconnaissance: MQ-9B SkyGuardian
- Trainer: F-16B, SF.260
- Transport: A400M Atlas, Dassault Falcon 7X
- Tanker: A330 MRTT (NATO MRTT unit)

The Belgian Air Force (Dutch: Luchtmacht, French: Force aérienne) is the air arm of the Belgian Armed Forces. Between January 2002 and July 2024 it was known as Belgian Air Component (Dutch: Luchtcomponent; French: Composante air). It was founded in 1909 and is one of the world's oldest air services.

The commander is Major General Geert De Decker, appointed on 20 March 2025.

== History ==
=== Foundation and early years ===
The Belgian Air Force was founded in 1909 as a branch of the Belgian Army, carrying the name Compagnie des Ouvriers et Aérostiers. King Albert's interest in the military use of aircraft was the main impetus for its formation. Coincidentally, in the civil aviation sector, Baron Pierre de Caters earned the first civil pilot's brevet that same year. De Caters would promptly establish an aviation school. At approximately the same time, the War Ministry followed the French military's example and had pilots earn a civil pilot's brevet before their military one.

In 1910, three Belgian lieutenants earned their pilot's brevets at the school, paying their own fees. Two of the artillery lieutenants were Baudouin Montens d'Oosterwyck, who earned Brevet No. 19 on 30 September, and Alfred Sarteel, granted No. 23 on 10 November. The third lieutenant, Georges Nelis, was the new force's first aviation candidate, gaining Brevet No. 28 on 21 December. An aircraft was personally purchased for him.

In spring of 1911, the new air force established its military aviation school with five pilots, two mechanics, and a woodworker. It received its first aircraft via Baron Caters, who gave the aircraft to King Albert, who in turn presented it to the school.

On 12 September 1912, pilot Lieutenant Nelis and observer Sous Lieutenant Stellingwerff were the first Europeans to fire a machine gun from an aircraft; while Nelis brought the aircraft low, Stellingwerff put some bullets through a sheet staked out on the ground. They were disciplined for their efforts. Nelis then accompanied Capitaine Commandant Émile Mathieu to England during November 1913 to demonstrate aerial use of the Lewis machine gun at Hendon and Aldershot; as a result, the British adopted the Lewis, although the Belgians did not. Belgium entered World War I with aircraft tasked solely for reconnaissance missions.

=== World War I ===
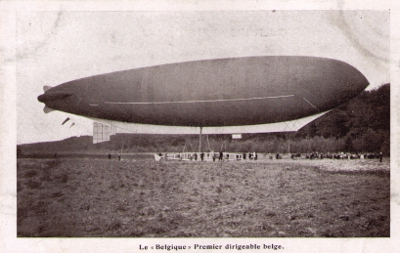
Belgique, the first Belgian airship

By the time of Belgium's entry into the First World War on 4 August 1914, the military aviation branch, now called the Aviation Militaire Belge (Belgische militaire luchtvaart, AMB), consisted of four squadrons, each consisting of four 80-horsepower Farman aircraft, although Escadrilles III and IV were still forming. A truck was assigned to each squadron, along with a fifth truck serving as a mobile workshop. Each squadron had a commander, five pilots, and six observers, with all officers seconded from parent units. As a result, most of the new aviators were from the Engineers and Artillery components of the Belgian armed forces. As the war began, a fifth squadron was created, staffed with civilian pilots called to the colors and equipped with Bleriots.

Sous Lieutenant Henri Crombez flew one of the first war patrols, in a Deperdussin racer on 4 August 1914 above Liège. Adjutant Behaeghe was the first to engage an enemy, a few days later. On 26 September, the Belgian air crew of Sous Lieutenant de Petrowski and Sergeant Benselin mortally wounded a German pilot with a rifle bullet and forced his Taube to land at Berchem-Sainte-Agathe; if they had submitted a claim for this victory, its approval would have marked history's first air-to-air combat victory.

On 3 January 1915, two machine guns supplied by British were fitted to two Belgian aircraft, making a dual effort against the foe possible; these were Belgium's first dedicated fighter aircraft. In February, thirteen of the Belgian airmen flew 28 offensive patrols; their first dogfight was fought on the 26th, with ten Albatroses against three Belgian Farmans. On 26 March, Sous Lieutenant Boschmans sent a German two-seater into a steep dive when he seemed to hit the pilot; the German was not seen to either crash or land. This was the Belgian aviators' first victory claim.

In April, Lieutenant Fernand Jacquet mounted a machine gun on his pusher aircraft and sought out the enemy. On the 17th, he and his observer (Lieutenant Henri Vindevoghel) scored Belgium's first confirmed aerial victory, sending an Albatros reconnaissance aircraft down in flames over Roeselare. Apparently at about the same time, Adjutant José Orta and Sous Lieutenant Louis de Burlet were the first to attack an enemy observation balloon when they dropped three small bombs on a gasbag over Houthulst, however they either did not hit, or failed to explode.

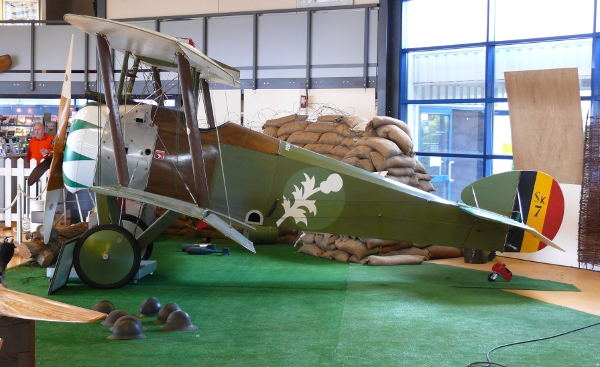
Sopwith Camel in the colours of the Belgian 1st Squadron

On 18 January 1916, the decision was made to form a dedicated fighter squadron. On 22 February 1916, Escadrille I became the 1ère Escadrille de Chasse. It consisted of newly supplied Nieuport 10s and one obsolete Farman two-seater. In August, the new squadron would upgrade to Nieuport 11s, and Escadrille V was turned into the 5ème Escadrille de Chasse. The new unit was the first to mount an offensive formation for the new air force; on 15 February 1917, they flew an offensive patrol of seven. By this time, the AMB had grown to 44 aircraft, including 21 fighters. At this point, individual aircraft bore personal markings affixed by their pilots, but no unit designations.

In the summer of 1917, the AMB was allotted an active role in Allied aviation operations at the beginning of the Third Battle of Ypres. In March 1918, the AMB matured into a Groupe de Chasse. At this time, the role of the Escadrilles de Chasse was finally focused on their operation strictly as fighter units. There was a sorting out of pilots into fighter or reconnaissance roles. Not all fighter pilots went into the new fighter units; as of 1 May, 22 remained with reconnaissance units to fly escort missions. The King insisted that Jacquet be given the command of the Group. The newly organized fighter wing contained the two fighter escadrilles; however, 1ère Escadrille de Chasse became 9ème Escadrille de Chasse, and 5ème Escadrille de Chasse became 10ème Escadrille de Chasse. The 11ème Escadrille de Chasse was founded on 28 May to join them. By the start of the Allies final offensive in September 1918, the AMB was incorporated in the Allied aviation effort, and could send 40-plus aircraft into the air at one time. In its short span of service, the Groupe fought over 700 aerial combats and was credited with 71 confirmed and 50 probable victories.

==== Aircraft procurement difficulties ====
In June 1916 the nascent air force had received newer aircraft from the French in both single and double-seat versions of the Nieuport 10. The Belgians would continue to upgrade their aircraft throughout the war, though through their dependence on French manufacturers they became the stepchildren of the Allied effort from 1916 onwards. The introduction dates of various types, compared to the date of their acquisition by the Belgians, tells the tale. The Belgians got Nieuport 16s at the end of 1916. The Nieuport 17 came into service with the French as early as June 1916, but the Belgians received so few that in June 1917 they were still operating all their earlier Nieuports. They then contracted for newer Nieuport 23s, which were basically up-engined Nieuport 17s. Spad VIIs had entered French service on 2 September 1916; the Belgians first received them almost an entire year later, with the first one on board on 22 August 1917. In September 1917, Belgium had the Hanriot HD.1 supplied to it the year after it was introduced. Spad XIIIs also came on line that month, but would not show up in Belgian inventory until the next year. Sopwith Camels first went into service in May 1917 and the AMB received its first one on 29 November 1917.

The AMB did make one attempt to design and build its own aircraft. However the Ponnier M.1 was not good enough for production, and the ten or so manufactured ended up with clipped wings as powered "Penguin" rollers for training rookie pilots.

==== Operational summary ====
One of its flying ace pilots, Willy Coppens, is ranked as the leading balloon buster of World War I as well as Belgium's top ace during the war. Four other pilots from the force also achieved ace status alongside him during the war: Andre de Meulemeester, Edmond Thieffry, Jan Olieslagers, and Fernand Jacquet.

The fledgling air force was entrusted with flying both King Albert and Queen Elisabeth over the battle front at times.

=== Between the world wars ===
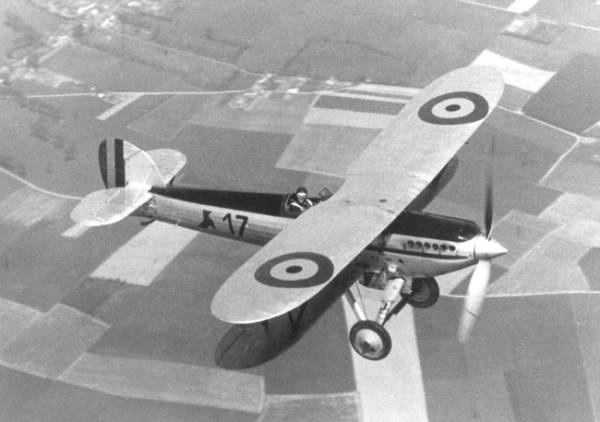
Belgian Fairey Firefly IIM, 1931

During the interwar period, the Belgian Army Air Force flew the Breguet 19. Some efforts were made to acquire aircraft from local production, such as those by Stampe et Vertongen and Renard. They also evaluated native designs like the ACAZ C.2 and LACAB GR.8, none of which entered mass production however.

=== World War II ===
At the start of World War II, the Army Air Force had three active Air Force Regiments. Aircraft which were used by those regiments were the Renard R.31 and R.32, the Fiat CR.42 Falco, the Hawker Hurricane, the Gloster Gladiator, the Fairey Fox, and the Fairey Battle. These were massacred by the much superior German Luftwaffe during the German invasion of May 1940. Before the outbreak of the war Belgium also sought to equip the Aviation Militaire with foreign designs, ordering production licences in Poland and France and aircraft in the USA. However, the acquired licences could not be used until May 1940 and the aircraft produced in the USA were eventually delivered to France and to the United Kingdom.

After the surrender of Belgium on 28 May 1940, a very small Belgian Air Force in exile was created in Great Britain as the Belgian section of the Royal Air Force Volunteer Reserve. This small force was active within the British Royal Air Force, and its squadrons were equipped with the Supermarine Spitfire and Hawker Typhoon.

=== The Cold War ===
On 15 October 1946, the Belgian military aviation was turned into an autonomous force, independent of the Belgian Army. From September 1953 to 1960, the Advanced Pilots' School (Ecole de Pilotage Avancé) operated Harvard trainer aircraft from the Kamina military base in the Belgian Congo. Seemingly about 60 Harvards were at the base.

=== Post-Cold War reforms ===
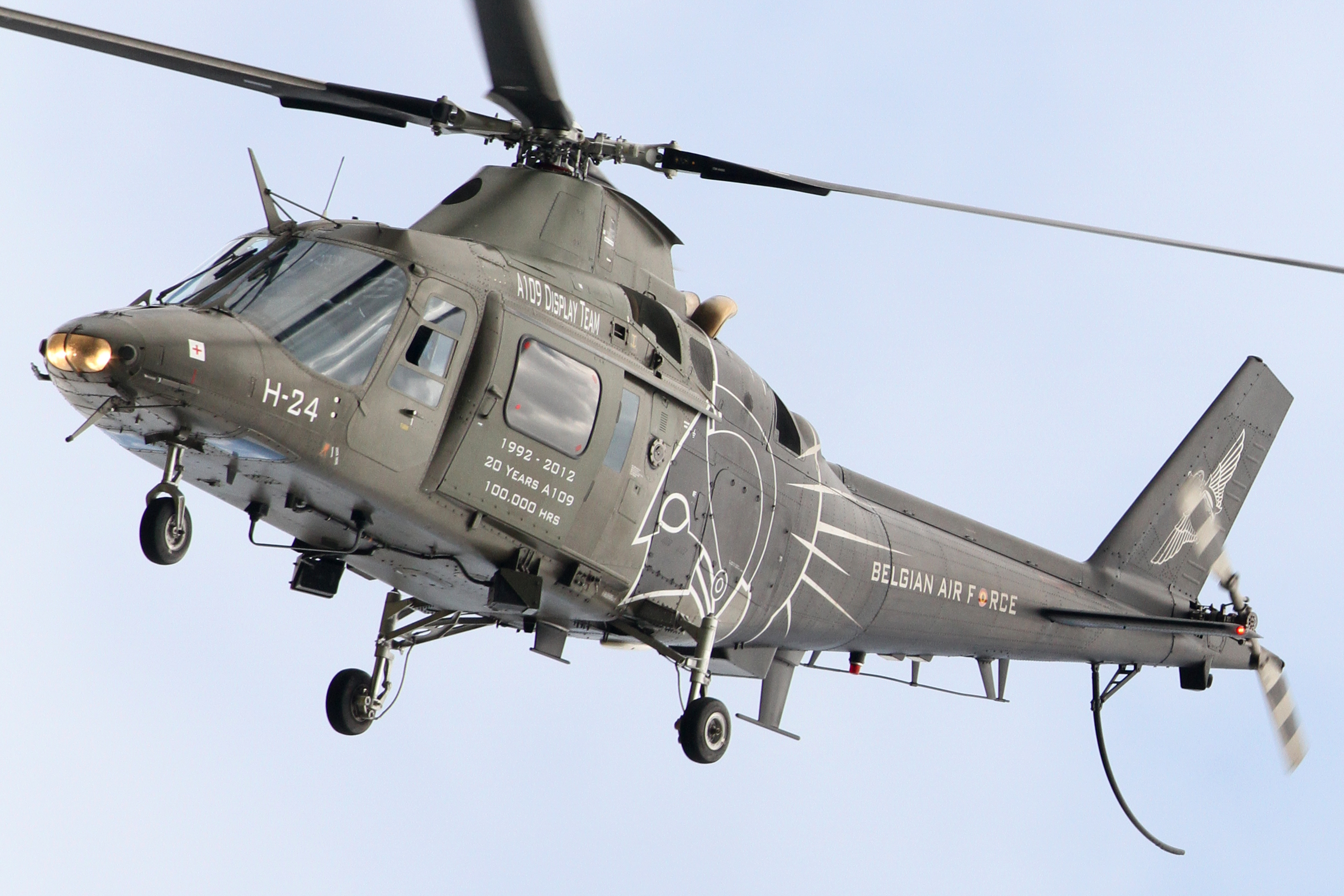
An Agusta A109BA of the Belgian Air Force

At the beginning of the 1990s, the end of the Cold War caused the Belgian government to restructure the Belgian Armed Forces in order to cope with the changed threats. The Belgian Air Force was hit hard and saw its strength more than halved with the disbanding of the 3rd Tactical Wing in Bierset (1994); the disbanding of the 1st Fighter Wing in Beauvechain; the 9th Training Wing in Sint-Truiden Air Base; and the Elementary Flying School in Goetsenhoven (1996).

In 2002, the Belgian government decided to emulate Canada and impose a "single structure" on its armed forces in which the independent Belgian Air Force ceased to exist. The Belgian Air Force consists of the 2nd Tactical Wing in Florennes Air Base and the 10th Tactical Wing in Kleine Brogel Air Base, both flying F-16s in four squadrons. Out of the 160 F-16s originally bought by Belgium, only 105 were upgraded; with further reductions to 72 aircraft in 2005; and planned to 60 by 2012. The 1st Wing at Beauvechain Air Base is assigned for the training of pilots, using the piston-powered Aermacchi SF.260 for elementary training, and the Alpha Jet for advanced training. Advanced combat training is done on F-16's at Kleine Brogel. COMOPSAIR still operates the Lockheed C-130 Hercules in the 15th Air Transport Wing based at Melsbroek Air Base, planning to replace them by seven Airbus A400M transport aircraft. VIPs are transported with Embraer 135/145 jets, Dassault 20/900, and the Airbus A321. The Sea King SAR helicopters were phased out in March 2019 after more than 40 years of service and replaced by NH90s (4 NFH + 4 TTH). The Alouette III helicopters flown for the Belgian Navy in a utility-role were phased out in 2021.

In 2004, as part of the unified structure, the Army Aviation units of the Wing Heli were transferred to the COMOPSAIR. These contain the Agusta A109 attack helicopter, and the Alouette II training and recce helicopter. In 2005, the Belgian Alpha Jets moved to Cazaux in France to continue the Initial Operational Training, while the Advanced Jet Training was done on French Alpha Jets at Tours. As from 2013 both Advanced Jet Training as well as Initial Operational Training are completed in Cazaux in France. Within the framework of its commitments within the North Atlantic Treaty Organization, NATO, Belgium has assigned its 72 F-16s to NATO purposes. Two squadrons with a total of 16 aircraft have been designated for use by the Rapid Reaction Forces. In February 2008, Defense Minister Pieter De Crem announced that due to increasing problems and poor serviceability, the two A310s were to be replaced as soon as possible by two aircraft in the same class. An Airbus A330 was dry-leased to take their place till March 2014 where it was replaced by an Airbus A321. On 1 September 2010, the Wing Heli in Bierset was disbanded and the Agusta A109 helicopters moved to Beauvechain Air Base to become 1st Wing. The SF260 squadrons became part of the Basic Flying Training School. On 24 May 2011, it was reported that the two retired Airbus A310 aircraft have been sold to the Brussels-based company MAD Africa for the amount of 700,000 euros. The company then sold them on to the Dutch Van Vliet transport company, who in their turn will transfer the aircraft to an as yet unspecified Abu Dhabi-based operator.

=== 1990s ===
In January 1991, 18 Mirage 5 aircraft of the 3rd Tactical Wing were deployed to Turkey's Diyarbakır air base. During this operation, Belgian aircraft carried out several flights along the Iraqi border. After this operation the obsolete Mirage 5s were phased out.

On 15 July 1996, a C-130 with serial CH-06 carrying 37 members of the Dutch Army Fanfare Band and four Belgian crew members crashed at Eindhoven after a bird strike while executing a go-around, resulting in the loss of power to two engines. 34 passengers were killed, and only 7 survived. The accident is known in the Netherlands as the Herculesramp.

From October 1996, the Belgian Air Force cooperated with the Royal Netherlands Air Force in the "Deployable Air Task Force" in patrolling former Yugoslavian airspace. F-16s of the 2nd and 10th Tactical Wings, operating from the Italian bases of Villafranca and Amendola, were assigned to missions insuring the control of a No-Fly Zone over Yugoslavia, and providing the air support necessary for UN and NATO troops. Between 24 March and 10 June 1999, twelve Belgian F-16s carried out 679 combat sorties – the first time since the second World War that Belgian aircraft took part in active war operations in enemy territory – against Serbia during the Kosovo crisis. The last Belgian F-16 detachment left Italy in August 2001.

=== 2000s ===
On 29 March 2004, four F-16s from Kleine Brogel were transferred under NATO's Baltic Air Policing mission to the Šiauliai Air Base in Lithuania for three months, where they were employed in monitoring the Lithuanian, Latvian, and Estonian skies.

In 2005, the Helicopter Wing (WHeli – HeliW) deployed four A109 (including one Medevac) in Tuzla, Bosnia. In July, four F-16s deployed to Afghanistan to support the NATO International Security Assistance Force. From June to October 2005, the 80th UAV Squadron deployed its B-Hunter in Tuzla.

In 2006, Belgian Hunter UAVs deployed to the Democratic Republic of the Congo as part of the EU EUFOR peacekeeping mission. At the same time, the Helicopter Wing (WHeli – HeliW) deployed three A109 (including 1 Medevac) in Mostar, Bosnia, in Operation Blue Bee.

On 1 December 2006 the Belgian Air Component deployed again under Baltic Air Policing mission four F-16 MLU aircraft to Šiauliai Air Base in Lithuania, to defend the airspace of Estonia, Latvia, and Lithuania.

From August 2008, four F-16s were deployed to Kandahar in Afghanistan in support of the Dutch land forces.

=== 2010s ===
In March 2011, Belgium deployed six F-16 fighters to Araxos in Greece, in support of Operation Odyssey Dawn, to support the NATO operations over Libya. The aircraft were already at the base as part of a joint exercise and were transferred to NATO command. Up to June 2011, the aircraft had flown over 1,000 hours over Libya and attacked various military installations and targets.

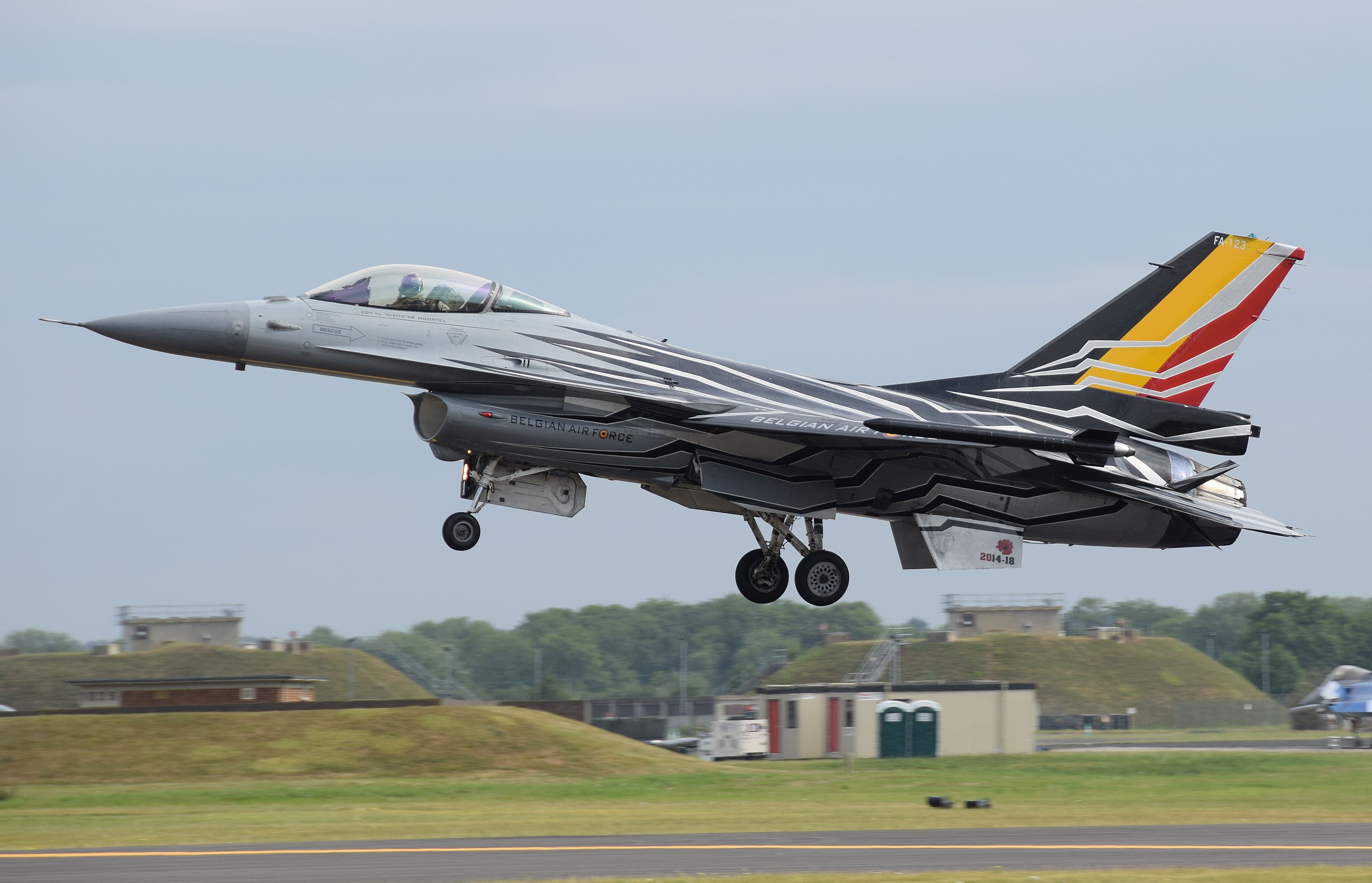
The display F-16AM arriving at the 2017 RIAT, England

Belgian Airbus A400M Atlas.

On 12 September 2011 a Wikileaks document showed a diplomatic cable from the American ambassador and the Minister of Defence Pieter De Crem that Belgium is interested in buying off-the-shelf Lockheed F-35 Lightnings by 2020.

In 2013 the Belgian Air Force supported French operations in Mali providing Medevac helicopter support with two A109 helicopters and two C-130 Hercules in a tactical air transport role.

On 2 September 2013, four F-16 Fighting Falcon fighter-jets of the Belgian Air Force landed at the Šiauliai Air Base to take charge of NATO's Air Policing mission over the Baltic states.

Between October 2014 and July 2015 six Lockheed Martin F-16AM Fighting Falcons were deployed under Operation Desert Falcon to Muwaffaq Salti Air Base as part of military intervention against the Islamic State of Iraq and the Levant.

On 11 October 2018, one Belgian F-16 was completely destroyed and a second damaged, in a fire at Florennes Air Base, reportedly caused by the accidental firing of a cannon.

On 25 October 2018, Belgium officially selected the offer for 34 F-35As to replace the current fleet of around 54 F-16s. In the accompanying news conference, government officials stated that the decision to select the F-35 over the Eurofighter Typhoon came down to the price, and later stated that "The offer from the Americans was the best in all our seven valuation criteria". The total purchasing price for the aircraft and its support until 2030 totaled €4 billion, €600 million cheaper than the initially budgeted €4.6 billion. First deliveries were scheduled to take place in 2023.

On 19 September 2019, a Belgian Air Force F-16 crashed in France.

=== 2020s ===
In 2022 the STAR program (Strategic Defense Review) was announced by the Belgian Ministry of Defense which plans for the upgrade of the existing 4 NFH90 helicopters used by the Belgian Navy with currently lacking ASW Sensors & Weapons, the replacement of the remaining 10 Augusta A109Bi helicopters by new 15 Light Utility Helicopter (Airbus H145) and the acquisition of 6-8 heavy transport helicopters (CH-47F) to replace the 4 TTH90's whereby closer cooperation with the Royal Netherlands Air and Space Force is considered.

During 2025, Belgian Air Force transport aircraft made several trips to the Democratic Republic of the Congo and Burundi, where they support military logistics in the context of the escalation of the M23 campaign. Its activity in the African Great Lakes region has increased since the fall of the cities of Goma and Bukavu to the M23/Congo River Alliance rebel forces in early 2025. In November 2025, Burundi approved a year-long clearance for three Belgian Air Force Airbus A400Ms to fly into Burundian airspace and land at Melchior Ndadaye International Airport in Bujumbura through 2026.

=== Joint air policing ===
On 4 March 2015, the Belgian and Dutch ministers of defence, along with the ambassador of Luxembourg to the Netherlands, signed an agreement on joint air policing. Starting mid-2017, the Belgian Air Component and the Royal Netherlands Air and Space Force will take turns keeping two F-16s on quick reaction alert (QRA) defending the airspace of all three Benelux countries. The agreement could allow the Belgian minister of defence to order a Dutch aircraft to use lethal force over Belgian airspace, and vice versa. Luxembourg, while currently covered by Belgian QRA, does not allow the use of lethal force over its territory.

== Organization ==
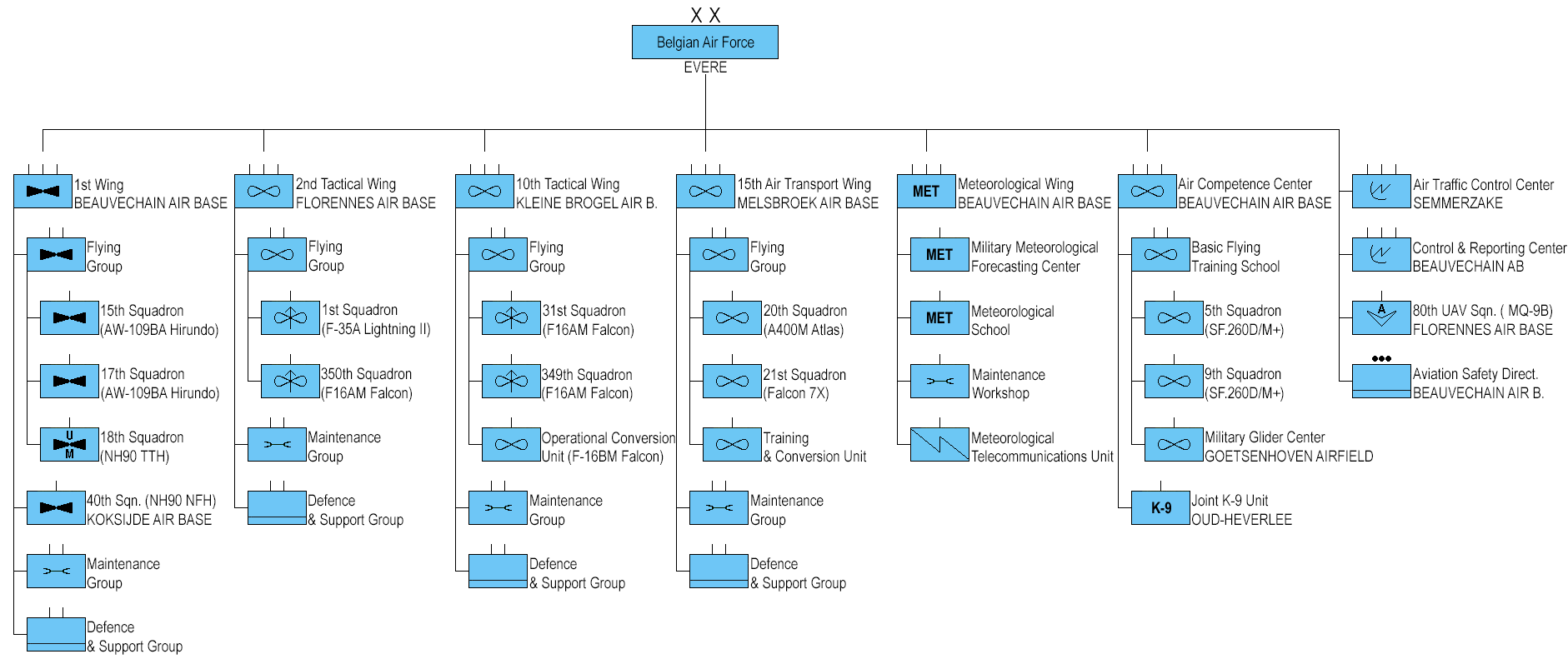
Belgian Air Force organization 2025

As of 2025, the Belgian Air Force has about 6,500 total active personnel divided in 10 operational units and an headquarters. In the near future, an air-artillery unit with long range surface to air missiles is to be re-established.

- Belgian Air Force Headquarters, in Evere
  - Air Traffic Control Center, in Semmerzake
  - Control and Reporting Center, at Beauvechain Air Base, reports to NATO's Integrated Air Defense System CAOC Uedem in Germany
  - 80th UAV Squadron, at Florennes Air Base, with MQ-9B SkyGuardian unmanned aerial vehicles
  - Aviation Safety Directorate, at Beauvechain Air Base
  - 1st Wing (Helicopters), at Beauvechain Air Base
    - 15th Squadron (Operational Conversion and Training Unit), with AW109BA Hirundo helicopters (to be replaced with H145M helicopters)
    - 17th Squadron, with AW109BA Hirundo helicopters (to be replaced with H145M helicopters)
    - 18th Squadron, (Squadron's NH90 TTH helicopters retired in September 2025)
    - 40th Squadron, at Koksijde Air Base with NH90 NFH helicopters
  - 2nd Tactical Wing, at Florennes Air Base
    - 1st Squadron, with F-35A Lightning II
    - 350th Squadron, with F-16AM Falcon (will receive F-35A Lightning II in 2026)
  - 10th Tactical Wing, at Kleine Brogel Air Base
    - 31st Squadron, with F-16AM Falcon (will receive F-35A Lightning II in 2027)
    - 349th Squadron, with F-16AM Falcon (will receive F-35A Lightning II in 2027)
    - Operational Conversion Unit, with F-16BM Falcon (will disband after the introduction of the F-35A Lightning II)
  - 15th Air Transport Wing, at Melsbroek Air Base
    - 20th Squadron, with A400M Atlas
    - 21st Squadron, with 2 × Falcon 7X aircraft
  - Air Force Competence Center, at Beauvechain Air Base
    - Basic Flying Training School, at Beauvechain Air Base
      - 5th Squadron, with SF.260D/M+ trainers
      - 9th Squadron, with SF.260D/M+ trainers
      - Military Glider Center, with L21B Super Cub and a variety of gliders
    - Joint K-9 Unit, in Oud-Heverlee
  - Meteorological Wing, at Beauvechain Air Base

== Equipment ==
=== Current aircraft ===
Aircraft	Illustration	Origin	Type	Variant	In service	Notes
Combat aircraft
F-16 Fighting Falcon		United States	Multirole fighter	F-16A/B	44	160 F-16 A/B originally delivered. Being gradually replaced by the F-35A.
F-35 Lightning II		United States	Swing-role fighter	F-35A	15 (+19 on order)	34 ordered in 2018, 11 more planned. 8 based at the Luke AFB for training.
Transport
Airbus A400M Atlas		Europe	Transport	–	7	Based in Melsbroek airbase. 1 from Luxembourg also based in Belgium.
Dassault Falcon 7X		France	VIP transport	–	2	Aircraft leased.
Cessna 408 SkyCourier		United States	SOF Air / Utility	-	0 (+5 on order)	
Helicopters
AgustaWestland AW109		Italy	Medevac / Scout	A109BA	10	Being phased out, and replaced by the Airbus H145M.
Airbus H145		Europe	Multirole / Utility	H145M	2 (+12 on order)	15 ordered in total with delivery planned in 2026-27..
NHIndustries NH90		Europe	SAR / Utility	NFH	4	Currently used as SAR / utility helicopter. To be modified and reassigned to ASW role (ship based).
Trainer
Pilatus PC-7		Switzerland	Basic trainer	PC-7 MKX	0 ( +18 on order)	18 ordered in 2025.
SIAI-Marchetti SF.260		Italy	Ab initio trainer	–	19	To be replaced by the Pilatus PC-7 MKX.
UCAV
MQ-9 Reaper		United States	MALE combat and Surveillance UCAV	MQ-9B SkyGuardian	3	4 ordered. Deliveries: 1 in August 2025; 2 in February 2026.

NOTE: Belgium was committed to transfer 30 F-16s to the Ukrainian Air Force from 2024 to 2028 in the context of the planned transition to the F-35A but facing serious delays up until 2025 none are transferred.

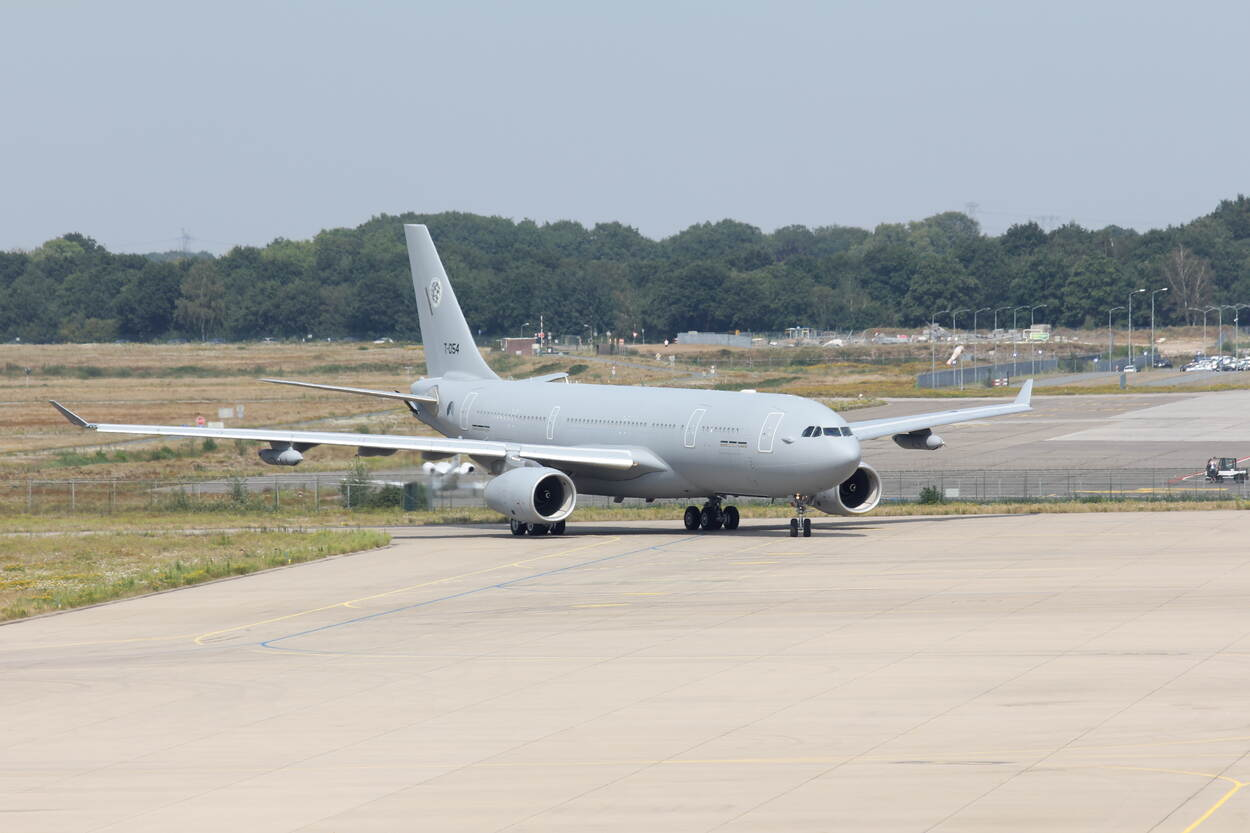
A330 MRTT

Belgium also participates in the Multi Role Tanker Transport fleet of NATO, a multinationally owned and operated fleet of MRTT Airbus A330. Beyond the air-to-air refueling as the core mission, the MRTT aircraft can also transport personnel and cargo, as well as conduct medical evacuation missions through a special configuration. On 22 December 2017, Belgium signed a contract for one MRTT, to be based at Eindhoven Air Base, and officially joined the program on 14 February 2018. In 2023 Belgium decided to invest another 265 million euros to contract a second A330 in the MRTT fleet. This second airplane, the 10th of the MRTT-fleet, arrived in september 2026.

The new Belgian government announced its intention to order up to 11 additional fighter jets on top of the 34 already ordered.

Negotiations are ongoing regarding to transfer the phased out NH90 TTH helicopters to France and still provide support to Belgian army to continue fulfilling its tactical lift requirements during a crucial period of capability transition.

Order of 15 H145M for Belgian Air Force combined with 5 extra aircraft to be used by Belgian Federal Police Air Support Unit. Helicopters will be supported & maintained by Belgian Air Force.

=== Retired aircraft ===
Below is a list of some notable retired aircraft

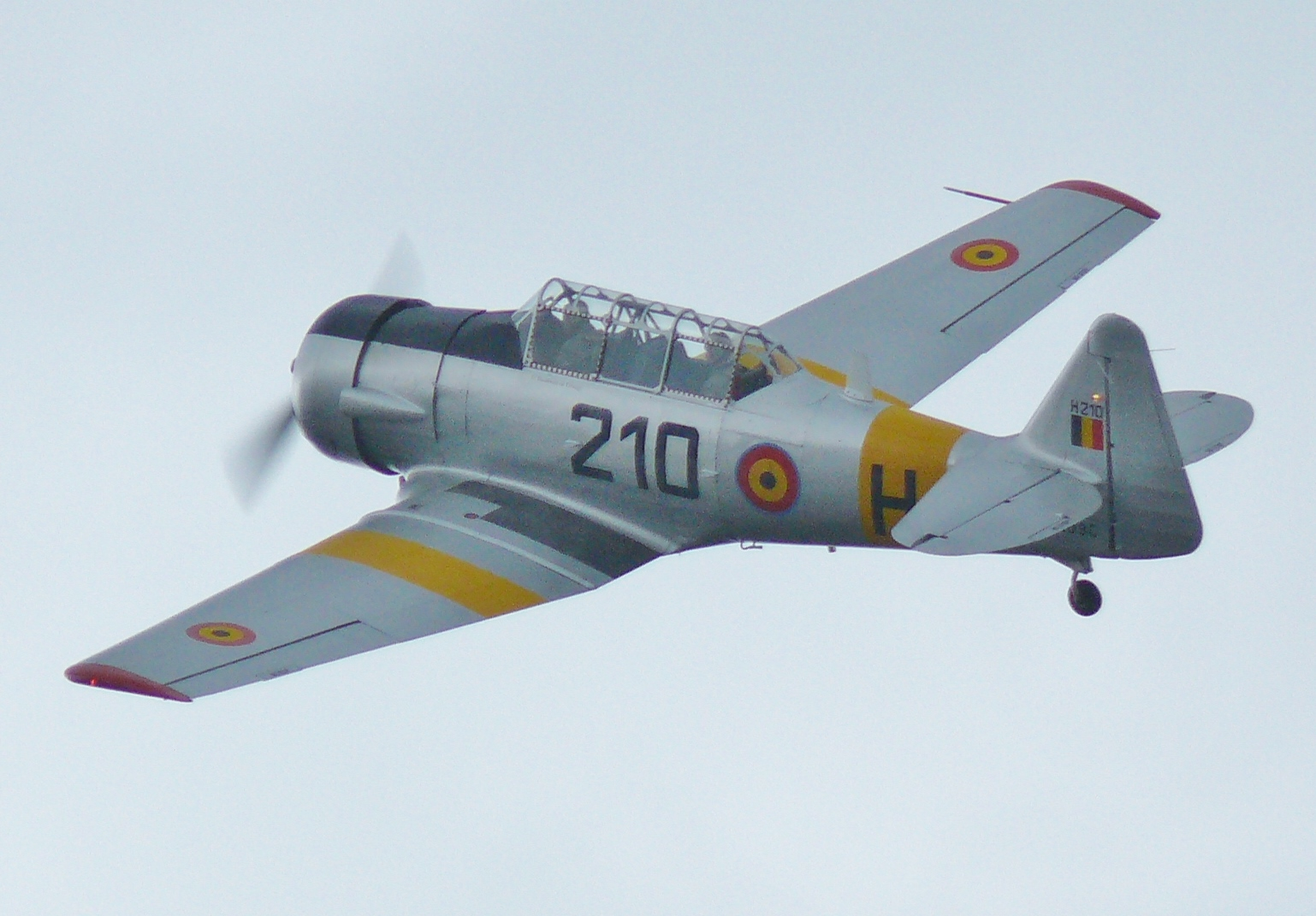
T6 Harvard war bird in flight

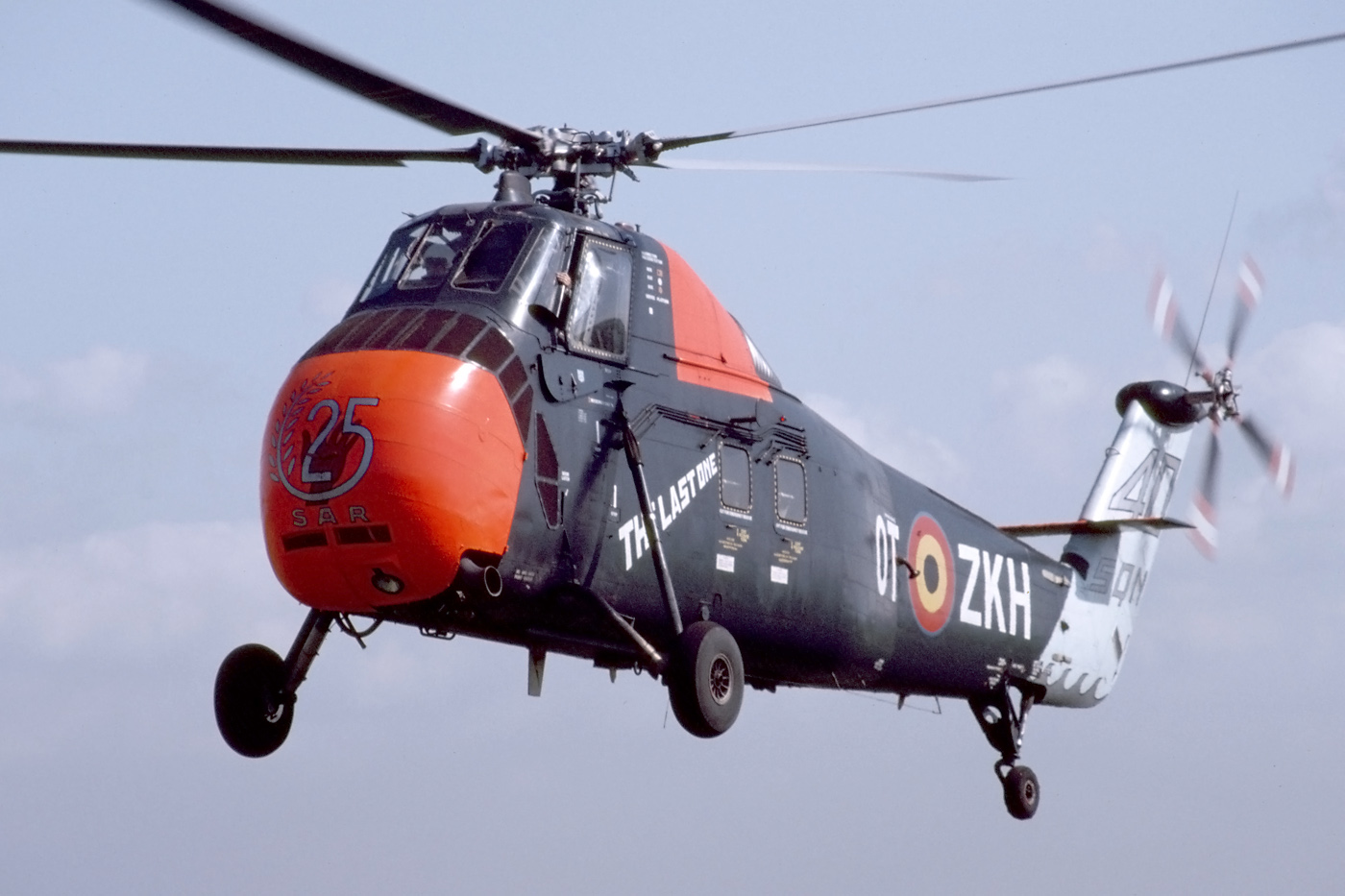
A Belgian S-58 on lift off

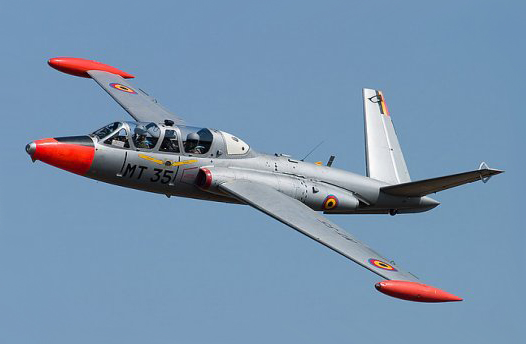
A Belgian Fouga Magister

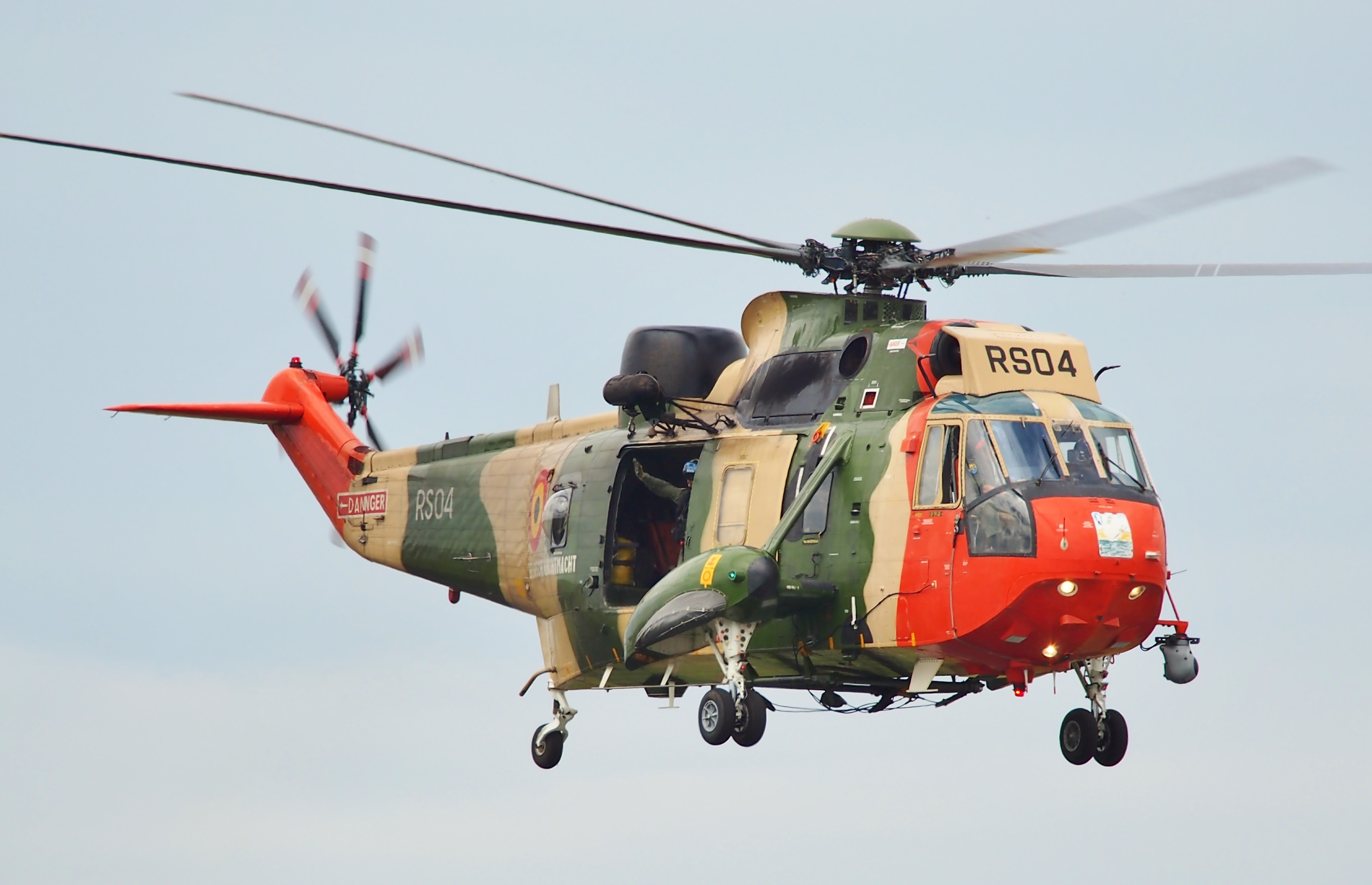
The Westland Sea King helicopter

Aircraft	Origin	Type	Variant	In service	Notes
Combat aircraft
Fairey Battle	United Kingdom	Bomber		14	
Fairey Fox	United Kingdom	Light bomber	II, III, VI, VIII	115	
Fiat CR.42	Italy	Fighter		23	
Gloster Gladiator	United Kingdom	Fighter		15	
Supermarine Spitfire	United Kingdom	Fighter	FR Mk XIV	53	
Gloster Meteor	United Kingdom	Fighter	F.4/F.8/NF.11	347	The NF.11 served as a night fighter
Hawker Hurricane	United Kingdom	Fighter	Mk I	11	License built by SABCA
Avro CF-100 Canuck	Canada	Interceptor	CF-100 Mk 5	53	In service 1957 - 1964
Republic F-84 Thunderjet	United States	Fighter-bomber	F-84E/H	213	In service 1951 - 1956
Republic F-84F Thunderstreak	United States	Fighter-bomber	F-84F	231	In service 1955 - 1972
Lockheed F-104 Starfighter	United States	Interceptor	F-104G	100	In service 1963 - 1983
Dassault Mirage 5	France	Bomber	BA	63	In service 1970 - 1994
Reconnaissance
Dassault Mirage 5	France	Reconnaissance	BR	27	In service 1971 - 1994
Republic RF-84F Thunderflash	United States	Reconnaissance	RF-84F	34	In service 1955 - 1972
Renard R.31	Belgium	Observation		19	
Auster AOP.6	United Kingdom	Observation		22	In service 1947 - 1955
Transport
Douglas C-54	United States	Transport		2	In service 1950 - 1971
C-130 Hercules	United States	Tactical airlifter	C-130H	12	In service 1971 - 2021
Boeing 727-100	United States	Transport	B727-029	2	Ex-Sabena, in service...
Airbus A310-200	Europe	Transport	A310-200	2	In service...
Airbus A330-300	Europe	Transport	A330-300	1	In service 2009 - 2014 (Leased from HiFly)
Airbus A321	Europe	Transport	A321-200	1	In service 2014 - 2020
Dassault Falcon 20	France	VIP transport	Falcon 20E	2	In service 1973 - 2016
Dassault Falcon 900	France	VIP transport	Falcon 900B	1	In service 1995 - 2019
Embraer ERJ145	Brazil	VIP transport		2	In service 2001 - 2020
Helicopters
Sikorsky S-58	United States	SAR	S-58C	11	In service 1961 - 1986
Westland Sea King	United Kingdom	SAR	Sea King Mk. 48	5	In service 1976 - 2019
Aérospatiale Alouette III	France	Liaison		3	In service 1971 - 2021 - Flown for the Belgian Navy
NHIndustries NH90	Europe	Transport / Utility	TTH	4	In service 2013 - 2025.
Trainer aircraft
Gloster Meteor	United Kingdom	Jet trainer	T.7	43	
Lockheed T-33 Shooting Star	United States	Jet trainer	T-33A	12	
Fouga CM.170 Magister	France	Jet trainer		45	
North American T-6 Texan	United States	Trainer		148	In service 1947 - 1962
Lockheed F-104 Starfighter	United States	Conversion trainer	TF-104G	12	In service 1965 - 1987
Alpha Jet	France / Germany	Light attack / Trainer	Alpha Jet B	33	In service 1978 - 2020
Unmanned aerial vehicles
IAI B-Hunter	Israel / United States	Reconnaissance		11	In service 2004 - 2020

=== List of obsolete weapons and equipment ===
- MIM-23 Hawk surface-to-air missile
- Nike Hercules surface-to-surface missile

== Personnel ==
=== Officer ranks ===
NATO code	OF-10	OF-9	OF-8	OF-7	OF-6	OF-5	OF-4	OF-3		OF-2	OF-1
Belgian Air Component
Belgian Air Component		Generaal	Luitenant-generaal	Generaal-majoor	Brigadegeneraal	Kolonel	Luitenant-kolonel	Majoor	Kapitein-commandant	Kapitein	Luitenant	Onderluitenant
Belgian Air Component		Général	Lieutenant général	Général-major	Général de Brigade	Colonel	Lieutenant-colonel	Major	Capitaine-commandant	Capitaine	Lieutenant	Sous-lieutenant
Belgian Air Component		General	Generalleutnant	Generalmajor	Brigadegeneral	Oberst	Oberstleutnant	Major	Stabshauptmann	Hauptmann	Leutnant	Unterleutnant

=== Other ranks ===
NATO code	OR-9		OR-8	OR-7	OR-6		OR-5	OR-4		OR-3	OR-2	OR-1
Belgian Air Component
Belgian Air Component	Adjudant-Majoor	Adjudant-chef	Adjudant	1ste sergeant-majoor	1ste sergeant-chef	1ste sergeant	Sergeant	1ste korporaal-chef	Korporaal-chef	Korporaal	1ste soldaat	Soldaat
Belgian Air Component	Adjudant-Major	Adjudant-chef	Adjudant	Premier sergent-major	Premier sergent-chef	Premier sergent	Sergent	Premier caporal-chef	Caporal-chef	Caporal	Premier soldat	Soldat
Belgian Air Component	Majoradjutant	Chefadjudant	Adjudant	1er Sergeant Major	1er Sergeant Chef	1er Sergeant	Sergeant	1er Korporal Chef	Korporal Chef	Korporal	1er soldat	Soldat

== Future ==
In the strategic defence vision report of the Belgian government it was stated that the Belgian air component will invest in 34 new fighter aircraft being introduced into service 2025–2030 and contribute for one aerial refuelling aircraft (A330 MRTT) as part of the Multi National Tanker Transport squadron based at Eindhoven Airport, to be able to deploy the new fighter aircraft in a more independent fashion.

The Sea King helicopters were retired in March 2019 after 43 years of service. The Alpha Jet was also retired in December 2019 and sold to Top Aces in July 2020. Future pilot training is to be conducted in the US at the Euro-NATO Joint Jet Pilot Training (ENJJPT) program based at Sheppard Air Force Base in Texas. In addition, the three Alouette III helicopters flown for the Belgian Navy were phased out in 2021 after 50 years of operational service.

On 25 October 2018, Belgium officially selected the offer for 34 F-35As to replace the current fleet of around 53 F-16s. In the accompanied news conference, government officials stated that the decision to select the F-35 over the Eurofighter Typhoon came down to the price, and later stated that "The offer from the Americans was the best in all our seven valuation criteria". The total purchasing price for the aircraft and its support until 2030 totaled €4 billion, €600 million cheaper than the initially budgeted €4.6 billion. First deliveries are scheduled to take place in 2023.

In 2018 the Belgian Government approved the negotiations to acquire two General Atomics MQ-9B SkyGuardian MALE drones which are planned to be operational from 2023, replacing the IAI Hunter drones phased out since early 2021.

In 2018 two Hercules aircraft were retired. In 2019 and 2020 additional aircraft were retired prior to the transition to the Airbus A400M starting in 2020. The remaining three Hercules were phased out in 2021, the last aircraft was withdrawn from Operational Service on 17 December 2021 after 50 years for service to the Belgian Air Force.

Belgium contributes one Airbus A330 MRTT tanker aircraft as part of the NATO MRTT Squadron based at Eindhoven Air Base, replacing the leased Airbus 321 which was phased out in 2020 and returned to the lessor.

In June 2020, it was deemed that the NH90 was too expensive and too few in numbers to be operated effectively, plans are now to withdraw the 4 TTH-versions by 2024 and focus solely on the NFH's SAR and naval operations and acquire sensor & armament upgrades for the NFH-90. A possible replacement could be the Airbus H145M, up to 15 could be ordered to replace both the NH90 TTH and the remaining Agusta A109BA's.

In January 2022, the Minister of Defence announced that the helicopter fleet will be completely renewed. There are plans to buy 15 new light utility helicopters (LUH) and 8 to 10 new heavy lift helicopters. The 4 NH90 TTH will be withdrawn and phased out.

In August 2022 the Belgian Parliament approved the new law on military programming, the STAR-plus plan; the Belgian Air Force will have a new helicopter fleet. The remaining 12 Agusta A109BA will be retired and the four green NH90 TTH helicopters will be withdrawn from service. (There were 8 in total, only 4 of the NFH version will remain in service) In the plan, the new fleet will look like this:

- 15 Airbus H145M (budget: €250 million)
- 10 heavy transport helicopters (budget: €612 million)
- 4 SAR helicopters (budget: €181 million)
- 4 existing NH90 NFH helicopters for all naval tasks

This would replace the current fleet of 20 helicopters (12 Agusta A109 and 8 NH90) with a fleet of 33 helicopters.

== See also ==
- List of Lockheed F-104 Starfighter operators
