= Renard R.31 =

R.31
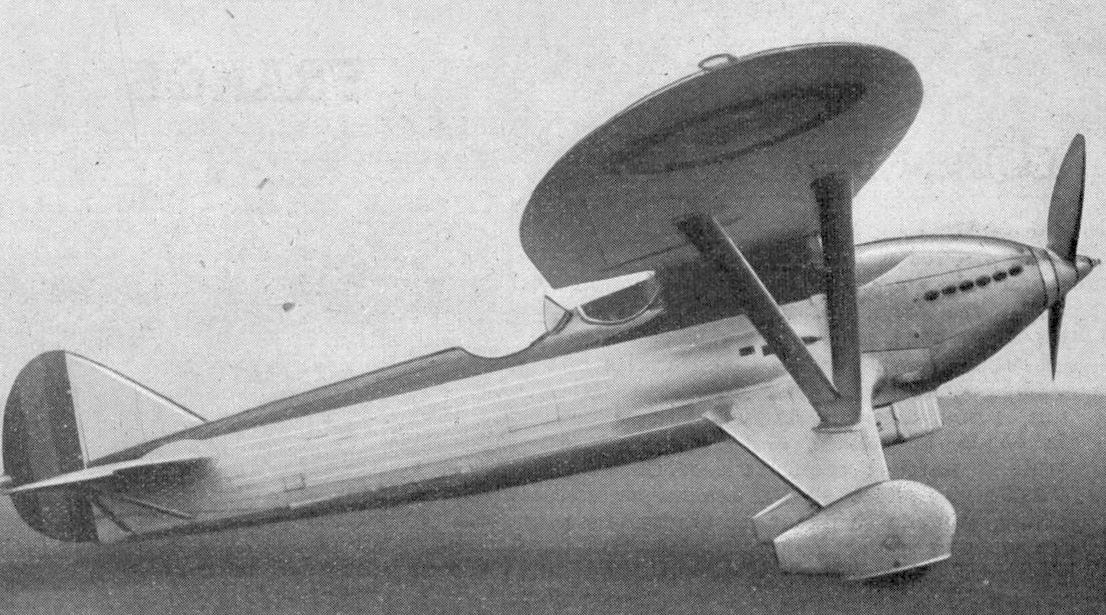

General information
- Type: Reconnaissance
- Manufacturer: Renard
- Primary user: Belgian Air Force
- Number built: 34

History
- Introduction date: 1935
- First flight: 1932
- Retired: 1940

The Renard R.31 was a Belgian reconnaissance aircraft of the 1930s. A single-engined parasol monoplane, 32 R.31s were built for the Belgian Air Force, the survivors of which, although obsolete, remained in service when Nazi Germany invaded Belgium in 1940. The Renard R.31 was the only World War II operational military aircraft entirely designed and built in Belgium.

== Design and development ==
The Renard R.31 was designed by Alfred Renard of Constructions Aéronautiques G. Renard to meet a requirement of the Belgian Air Force for a short ranged reconnaissance and army co-operation aircraft. It first flew from Evere Airfield, near Brussels, on 16 October 1932.

It was a parasol monoplane of mixed construction, powered by a Rolls-Royce Kestrel engine, with a welded steel tubing structure with metal sheet covering the forward fuselage and fabric covering of the remainder of the airframe. The wing was held in position by a single Vee strut on each side, conjoined with its fixed under carriage.

An order for 28 R.31s was placed in March 1934, with six to be built by Renard and the remainder by SABCA. One aircraft was fitted with a Lorraine Petrel engine for evaluation, but this was later replaced by the normal Kestrel engine. A second aircraft was fitted with an enclosed canopy and a Gnome-Rhône Mistral Major radial engine, becoming the R.32, with this then being replaced by a Hispano-Suiza 12Y engine, but the R.32 did not show sufficiently improved performance to gain a production order. A further six R.31s were ordered in August 1935.

== Operational history ==
The R.31 entered service with the Belgian Air Force in 1935, replacing the Breguet 19 in the 9^{e} and 11^{e} Escadrilles d'Observation based at Liège. In service, it was not popular, as it had poor handling, being vulnerable to entering flat spins if mishandled, with all aerobatics therefore being banned.

The R.31 was hopelessly obsolete. Those that were not destroyed on the ground during the German Blitzkrieg invasion of Belgium in May 1940 were ravaged by German fighters as they attempted to gather information on the German invasion. None of the planes apparently functioned as ground support aircraft during the brief Belgian Army resistance, instead flying fifty-four reconnaissance sorties in support of the Allied forces defending Belgium. The last sortie, flown on the afternoon of May 27, 1940, was also the final mission flown by the Belgian Air Force in its attempt to repel the Germans. Following the German occupation of Belgium, the Luftwaffe had no interest in the machines, and those that had survived the initial onslaught were either unused or destroyed. Overall, these planes had no significant impact on the war, although they were briefly involved.

== Operators ==
Belgium

- Belgian Air Force

== Specifications (Renard R.31) ==
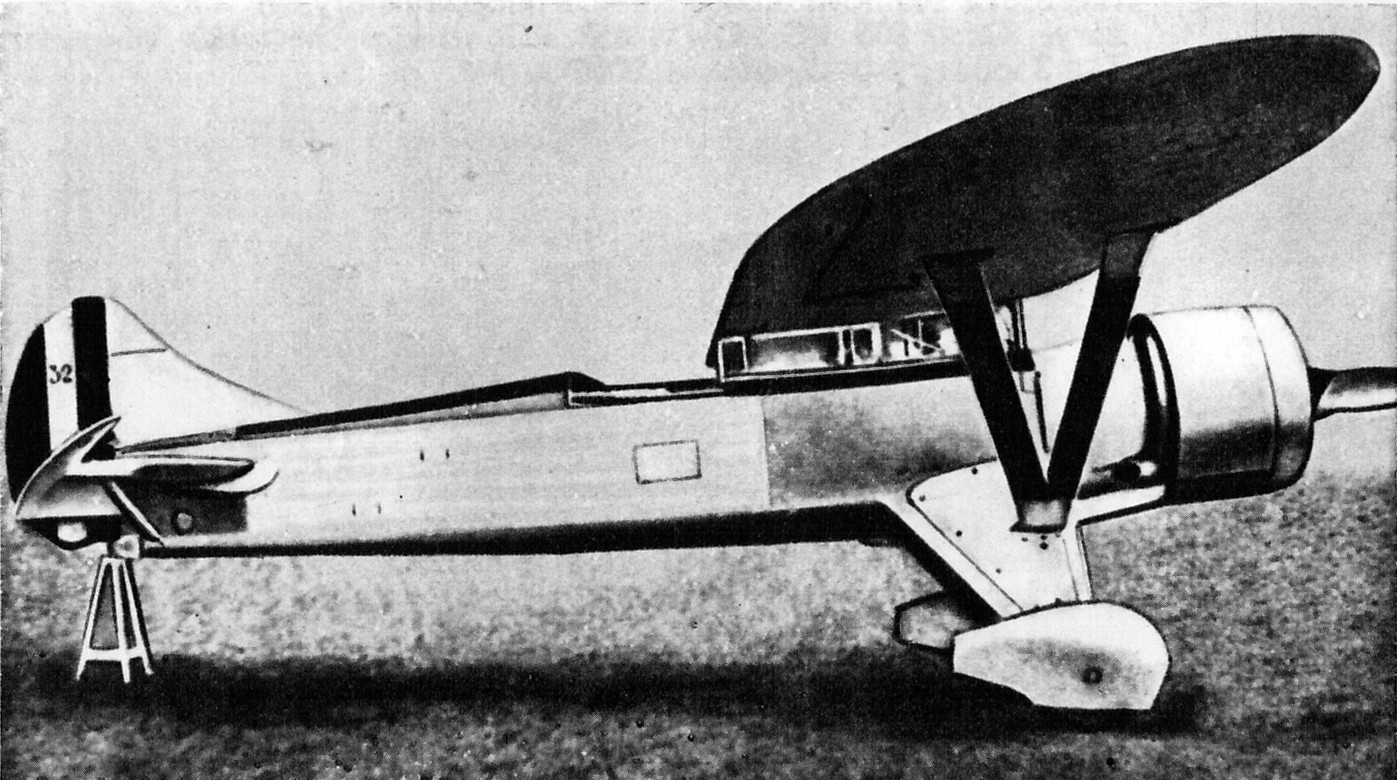
Renard R.32

Data from War Planes of the Second World War, Volume Seven, Bombers and Reconnaissance Aircraft

General characteristics

- Crew: 2
- Length: 9.2 m (30 ft 2 in)
- Wingspan: 14.4 m (47 ft 3 in)
- Height: 2.92 m (9 ft 7 in)
- Wing area: 32 m^{2} (340 sq ft)
- Airfoil: Biconvex
- Empty weight: 1,330 kg (2,932 lb)
- Gross weight: 2,130 kg (4,696 lb)
- Powerplant: 1 × Rolls-Royce Kestrel IIS V-12 liquid-cooled piston engine, 358 kW (480 hp)
- Propellers: 2-bladed wooden fixed-pitch propeller

Performance

- Maximum speed: 294 km/h (183 mph, 159 kn) at 4,000 m (13,000 ft)
- Cruise speed: 238 km/h (148 mph, 129 kn)
- Range: 650 km (400 mi, 350 nmi)
- Service ceiling: 8,750 m (28,710 ft)
- Time to altitude: 2,000 m (6,600 ft) in 5 minutes 30 seconds

5,000 m (16,000 ft) in 11 minutes 42 seconds

- Power/mass: 0.17 kW/kg (0.10 hp/lb)

Armament

- Guns: One or two forward-firing 7.62 mm Vickers machine guns and one 7.62 mm Lewis machine gun in flexible mount in rear cockpit

== See also ==
Aircraft of comparable role, configuration, and era

- Henschel Hs 126
- Westland Lysander

Related lists

- List of Interwar military aircraft
