= Wing Heli =

Military unit

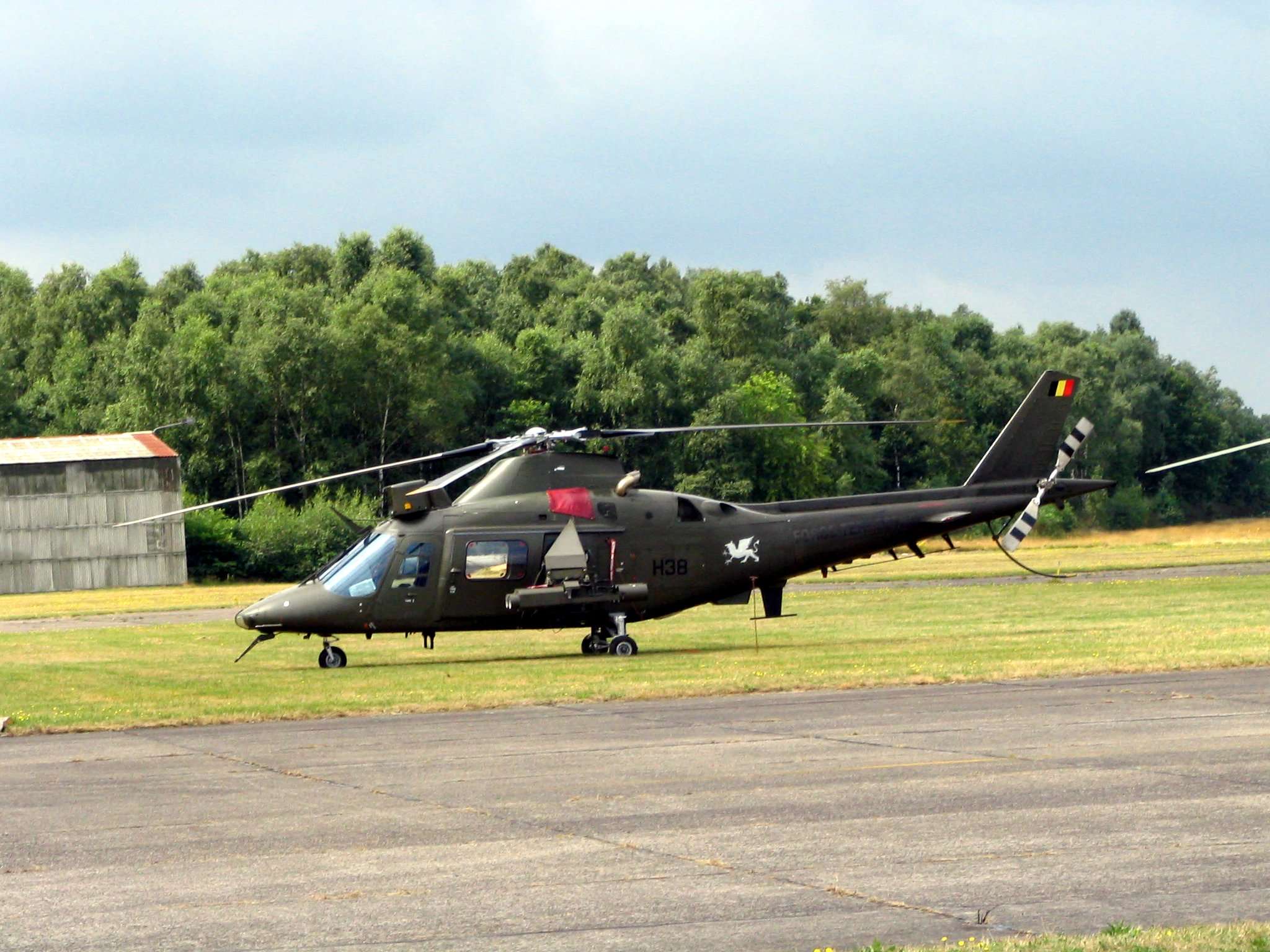
- An Agusta A109 attack helicopter of the Wing Heli
- Active: Disbanded on September 9, 2010
- Country: Belgium
- Branch: Air Component
- Garrison/HQ: Grâce-Hollogne
- Helicopters: Agusta A109; Alouette II

Commanders
- Current commander: Colonel Breckx, Ir.

The Wing Heli was a helicopter wing in the Air Component of the Belgian Armed Forces.

== Mission ==
The mission of the Wing Heli is to intervene in order to provide aid to the nation, urgent humanitarian aid and armed support on the national territory, to evacuate Belgian nationals from areas of crisis and to participate in peacekeeping operations.

== Equipment ==
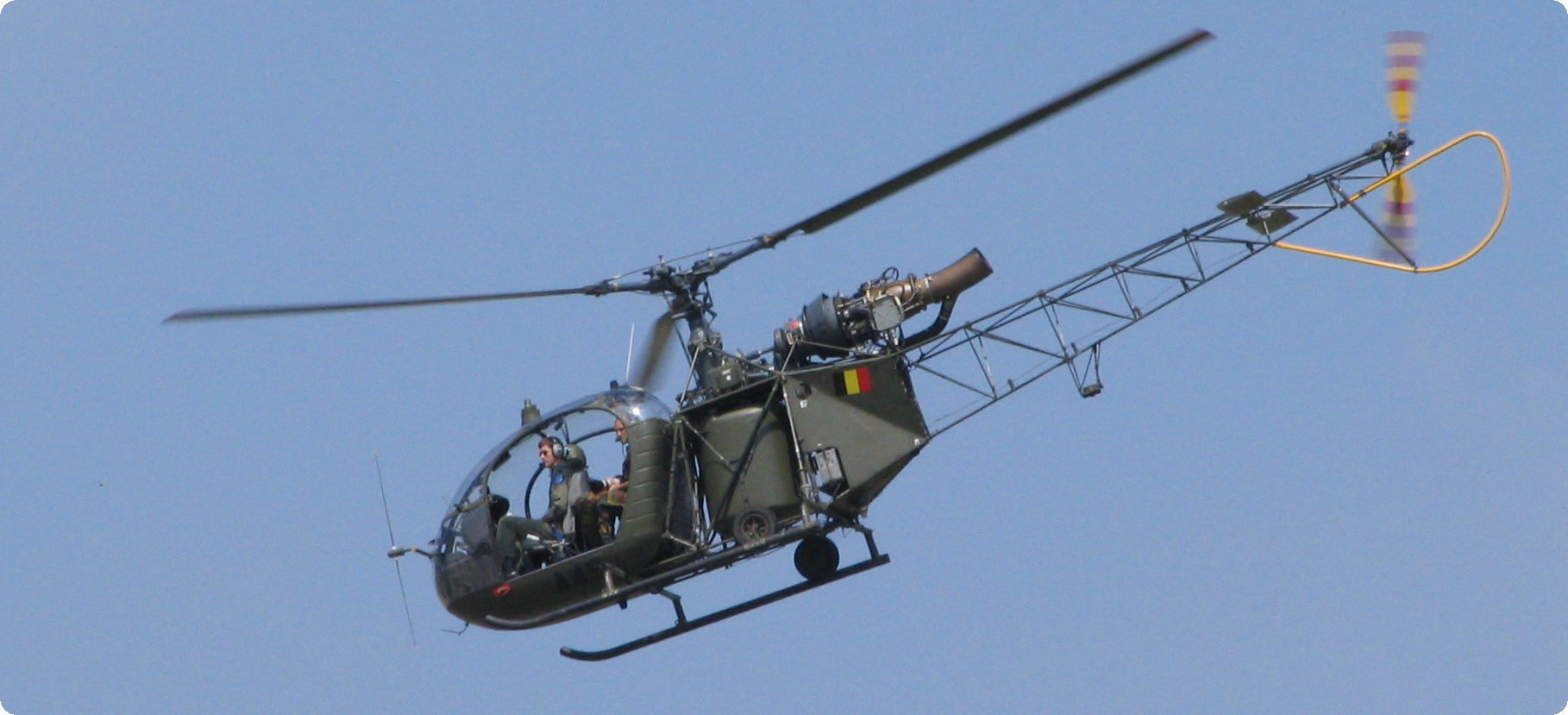
An Alouette II helicopter of the Wing Heli

- Agusta A109
- Alouette II (retired from service in September 2009)

== Battle honours ==
The standard of the Wing Heli bears the following battle honours:

- Campaign 1914-1918
- Yser 1917
- Flanders 1918
- Antwerp-Liège-Namur

These battle honours were obtained by the 6th Reconnaissance Squadron (French: 6ème Escadrille d'observation) during the First World War. This standard was presented to the Belgian Army Light Aviation by King Baudouin I on 17 May 1979.
On September 9, 2010, Wing Heli was disbanded and the standard was handed over to the Competence Centre Air. The A109BAs moved to Beauvechain to become 1st Wing.
