= Basic Flying Training School (Belgian Air Component) =

- Basis vliegschool (Dutch); École de pilotage de base (French)
- The badge of the school's parent unit, the Competence Center of the Air Component.
- Founded: 1 September 2010
- Country: Belgium
- Branch: Air Force
- Role: Flight Training
- Part of: Competence Center Air
- Garrison/HQ: Beauvechain Air Base
- Nickname: CC Air

Aircraft flown
- Trainer: SF 260; L-21

The Basic Flying Training School is a unit of the Belgian Air Component located at Beauvechain Air Base. It consists of 5th Squadron and 9th Squadron. Both operate the SF 260 "M" & "D" models.

The main mission of the school is to provide Phase II pilot training (5th Squadron) to the student pilots of the Belgian Air Component. After successfully completing this course, the students will continue their Phase IIb at 2/8 Sqn in Cazaux, France. After this Phase IIb, the students are assigned to one of three possible "tracks": fighter, transport or helicopter.

The school also provides a number of courses for confirmed pilots (9th Squadron).

The military glider centre is also part of the BFTS. This small unit, based at Goetsenhoven operates Piper Cub's in support of the Belgian Air Cadets.
