= 80th UAV Squadron (Belgium) =

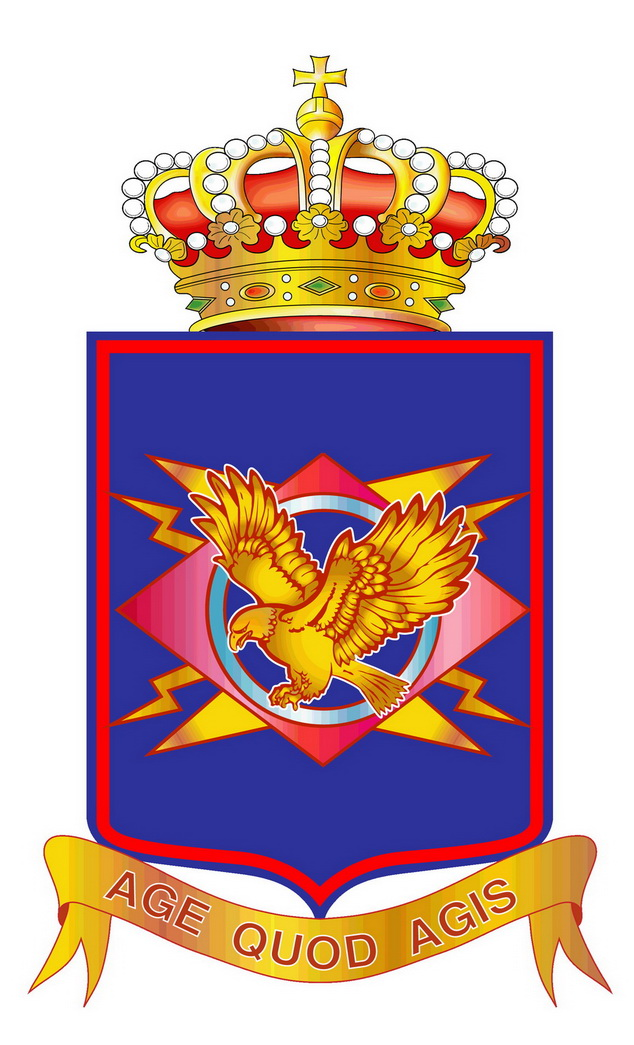
- Active: 1 July 2004
- Country: Belgium
- Branch: Belgian Air Force
- Role: UAV Reconnaissance
- Size: 120 personnel
- Garrison/HQ: Florennes
- Motto: Age Quod Agis (Do well what you do)
- Equipment: 9B SkyGuardian (from 2021)

The 80th UAV Squadron (French: 80 UAV^{e} escadrille, Dutch: 80 UAV^{ste} Smaldeel) is a squadron in the Belgian Air Force of the Belgian Armed Forces. It is dedicated to unmanned aerial vehicles, or UAVs. The squadron got its name in recognition of the 80th Artillery Battalion of the Belgian Army, which, in its day, was tasked with locating and identifying enemy positions and targets. As of 2021, the unit will commence operations with two 9B SkyGuardians in the aerial reconnaissance role; by 2031, the squadron will operate a total of four to six MQ-9B SkyGuardians, which replaced the IAI B-Hunter in service from 2004 to 2020.

== Mission ==
The 80th UAV Squadron's mission is real-time aerial reconnaissance, surveillance, visual intelligence gathering to support the Belgium Armed Forces, and other departments within the framework of aid to the nation, such as surveillance of territorial waters, forest fires, agriculture, border surveillance, fighting against organized crime, collecting information, and providing support to units of the Belgium Armed Forces.

== Deployments ==
- ALTHEA mission in Bosnia-Herzegovina - 2005
- EUFOR RD Congo Mission - 2006

Operations in Belgian territory:

- Support to firefighters during fires in the Fens - 2004
- Silent Watch mission over the North Sea (monitoring the degassing of boats) - 2008–2020
- Operation Vigilant Guardian - 2016
- Collaboration with the Federal Public Finance Service during customs control operations - 2017–2020
- Game counting for the Department of Nature and Forests

== Organisation ==
80th UAV Squadron consists of:

- HQ Staff and Support Flight
- UAV Flight
- Maintenance Flight

Since 2024, the 80 UAV Sqn was disbanded, and the 2nd Squadron of the Belgian Air Force was reactivated and took over the mission and responsibilities of the 80UAV Sqn.

== Link ==
Collection of 80 Sqn insignia
