= 1st Wing (Belgium) =

- 1st Wing Badge
- Country: Belgium
- Branch: Belgian Air Force
- Garrison/HQ: Beauvechain Air Base

Commanders
- Current commander: Colonel David Dupuis

The 1st Wing is a wing in the Belgian Air Force of the Belgian Armed Forces, located at Beauvechain Air Base.

== Training Wing ==
The 1st Fighter Wing (All Weather) was disbanded in 1996, with 349 Squadron and the Operational Conversion Unit moving to Kleine Brogel Air Base. 350 Squadron moved to Florennes Air Base. Later that year, all Belgian Air Force Training Squadrons moved to Beauvechain, creating 1st Wing. This unit was responsible for the education and training of the pilots of the Belgian Air Force and comprised the 5th Squadron, which operated the SIAI Marchetti SF260, the 7th Squadron and 11th Squadron, which operated the Alpha Jet. The 7th Squadron used to operate the Fouga Magister as well. Instructors of the 9th Squadron, also known as "Training and Evaluation Centre" (TEC), flew on the SF260 as well as the Alpha Jet. In 2005, 11th Squadron and the Alpha Jets moved to Cazaux in France, to participate in the Advanced Jet Training School (AJeTS). The Fouga Magister was retired from service in September 2007, and 7th Squadron moved to Tours in France. The 1st Wing then consisted of 5th Squadron and 9th Squadron, both operating the SF260.

== Helicopter Wing ==
On September 9, 2010, the A109 helicopters of the Wing Heli moved from Bierset to Beauvechain. The former Training Squadrons (5th and 9th) became the Basic Flying Training School, still located at Beauvechain. Wing Heli was disbanded, and 1st Wing became a helicopter wing, consisting of 15th (Operational Conversion and Training Unit), 17th and 18th Squadrons. 17th Squadron still operates the A109BA helicopter, while 18th Squadron started flying the NH90 as of October 2013.

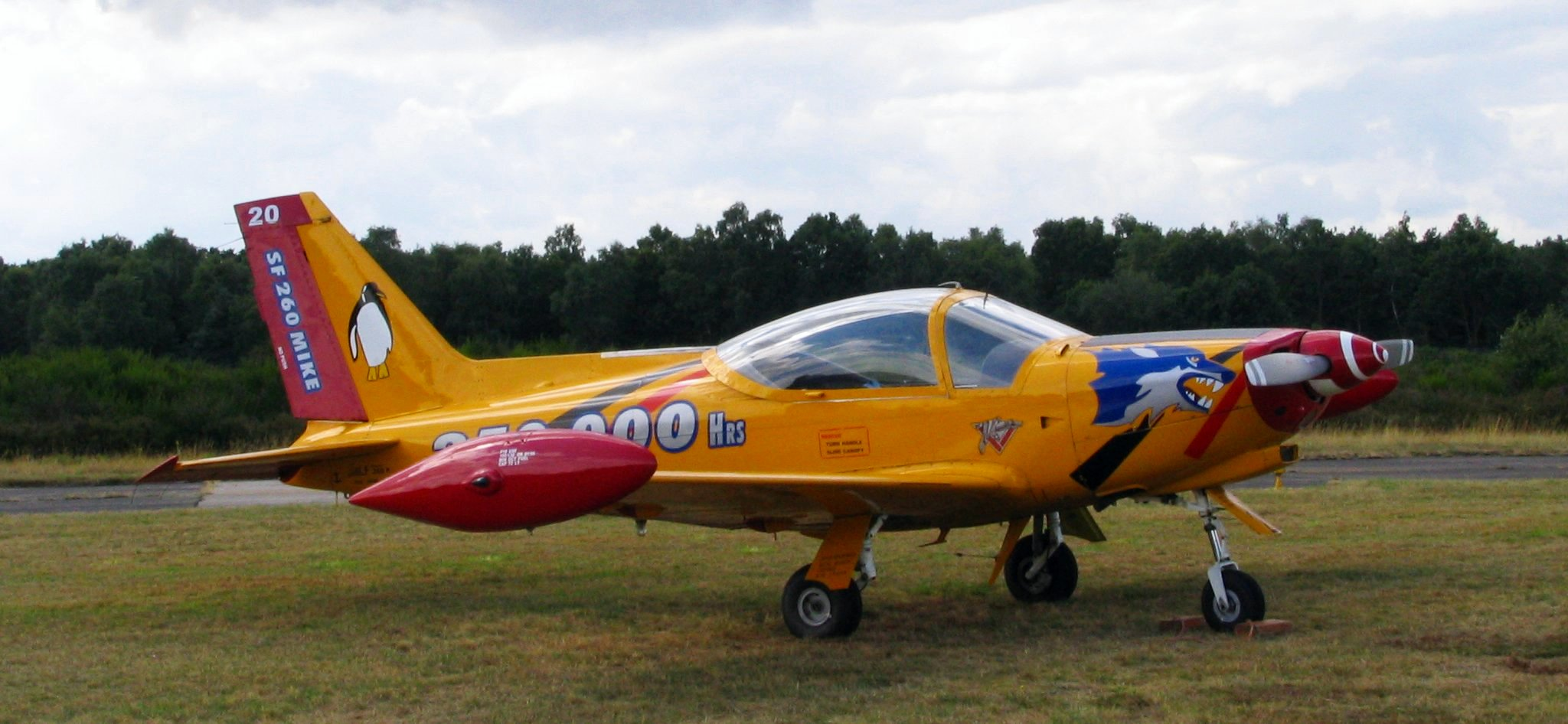
A SIAI Marchetti SF.260 of the Belgian Air Force

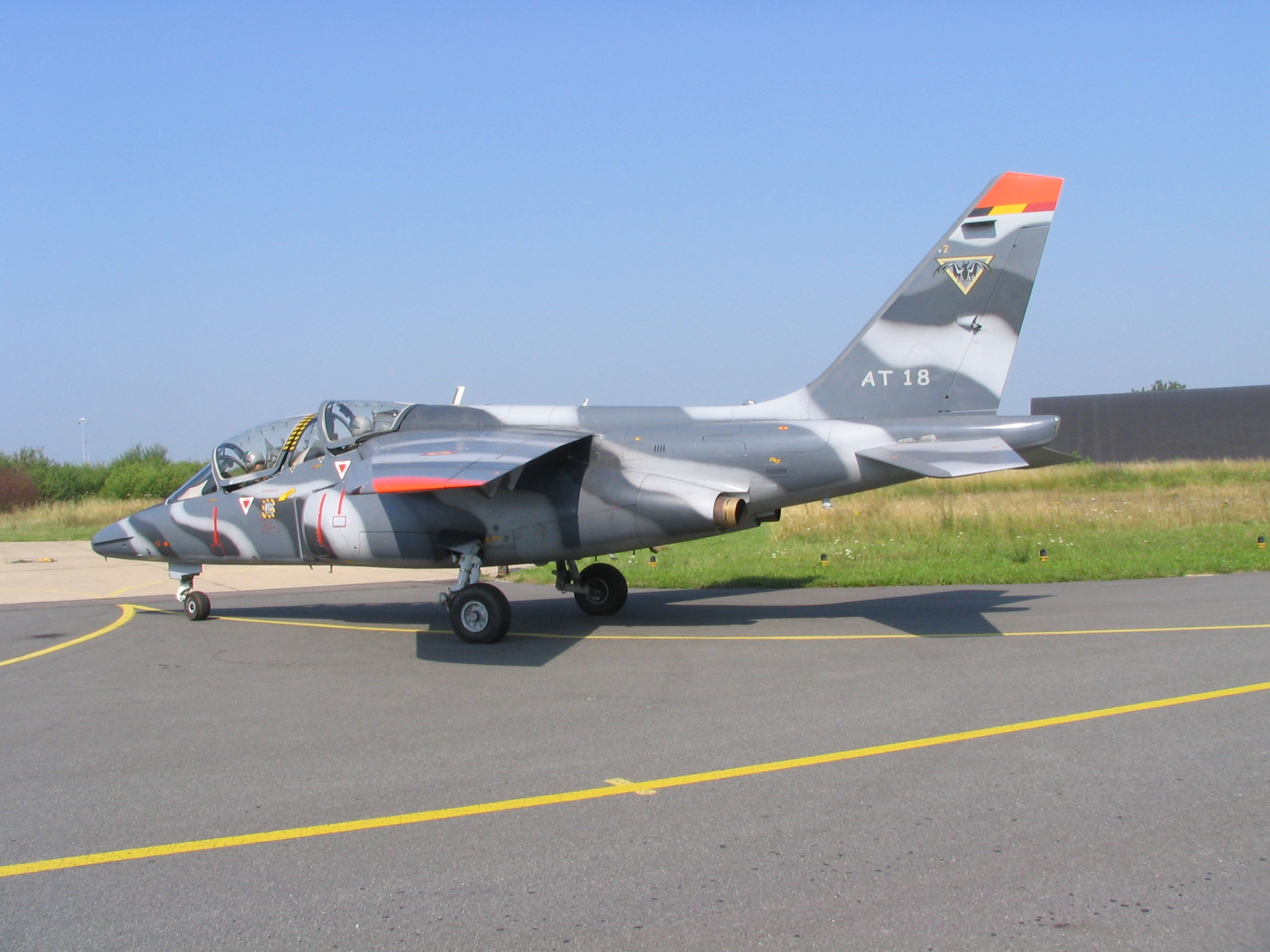
An Alpha Jet of the Belgian Air Force

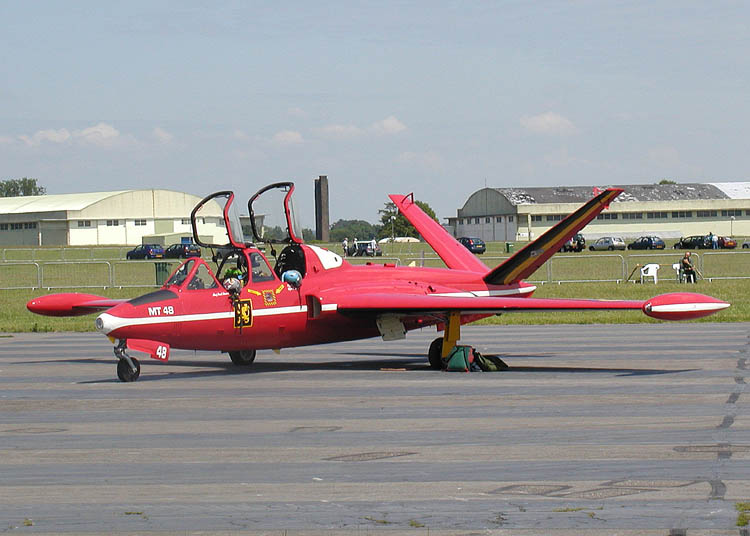
A Fouga Magister of the Belgian Air Force

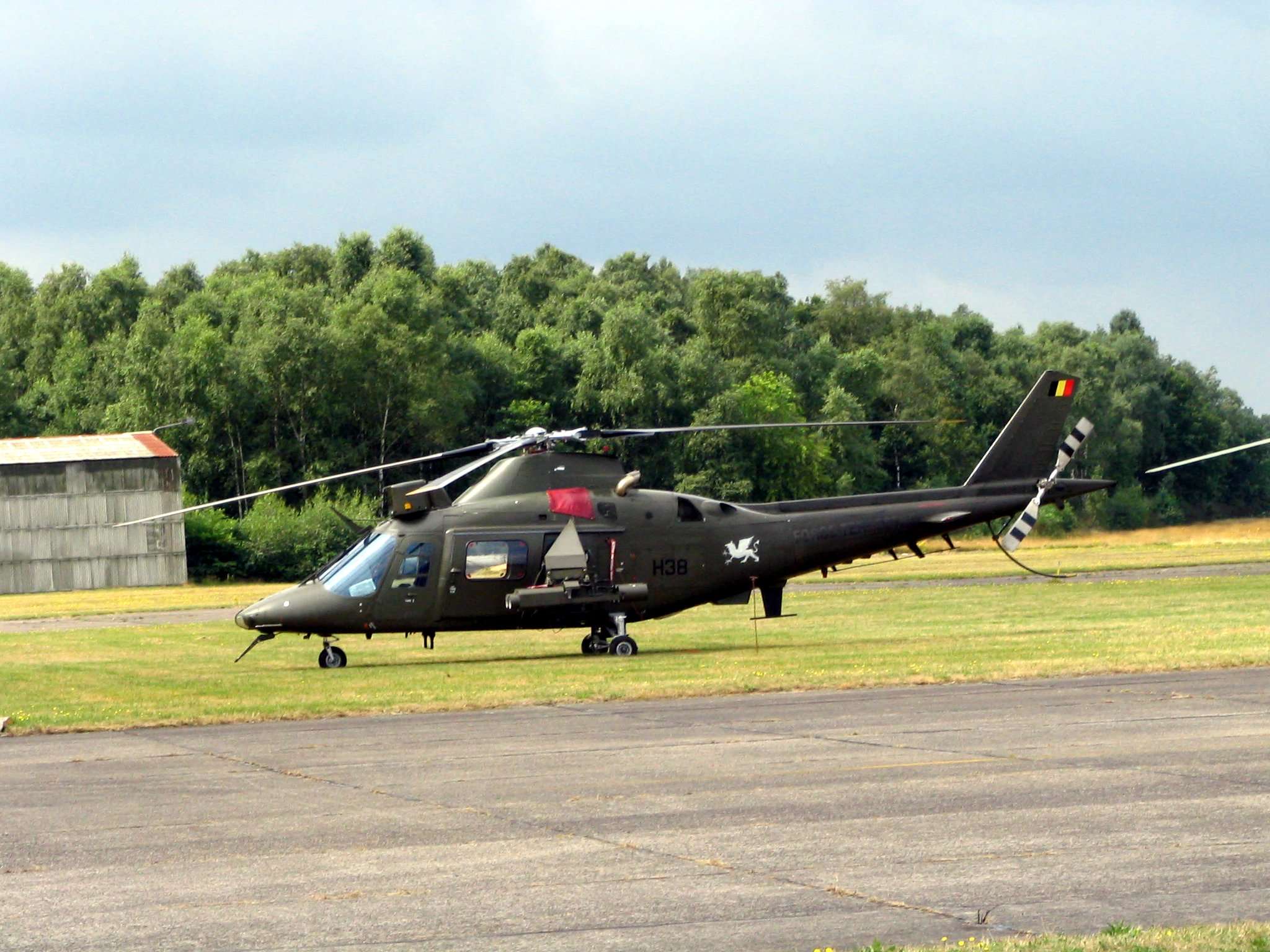
An A109BA helicopter of the Belgian Air Force
