= List of Lockheed F-104 Starfighter variants =

F-104 Starfighter
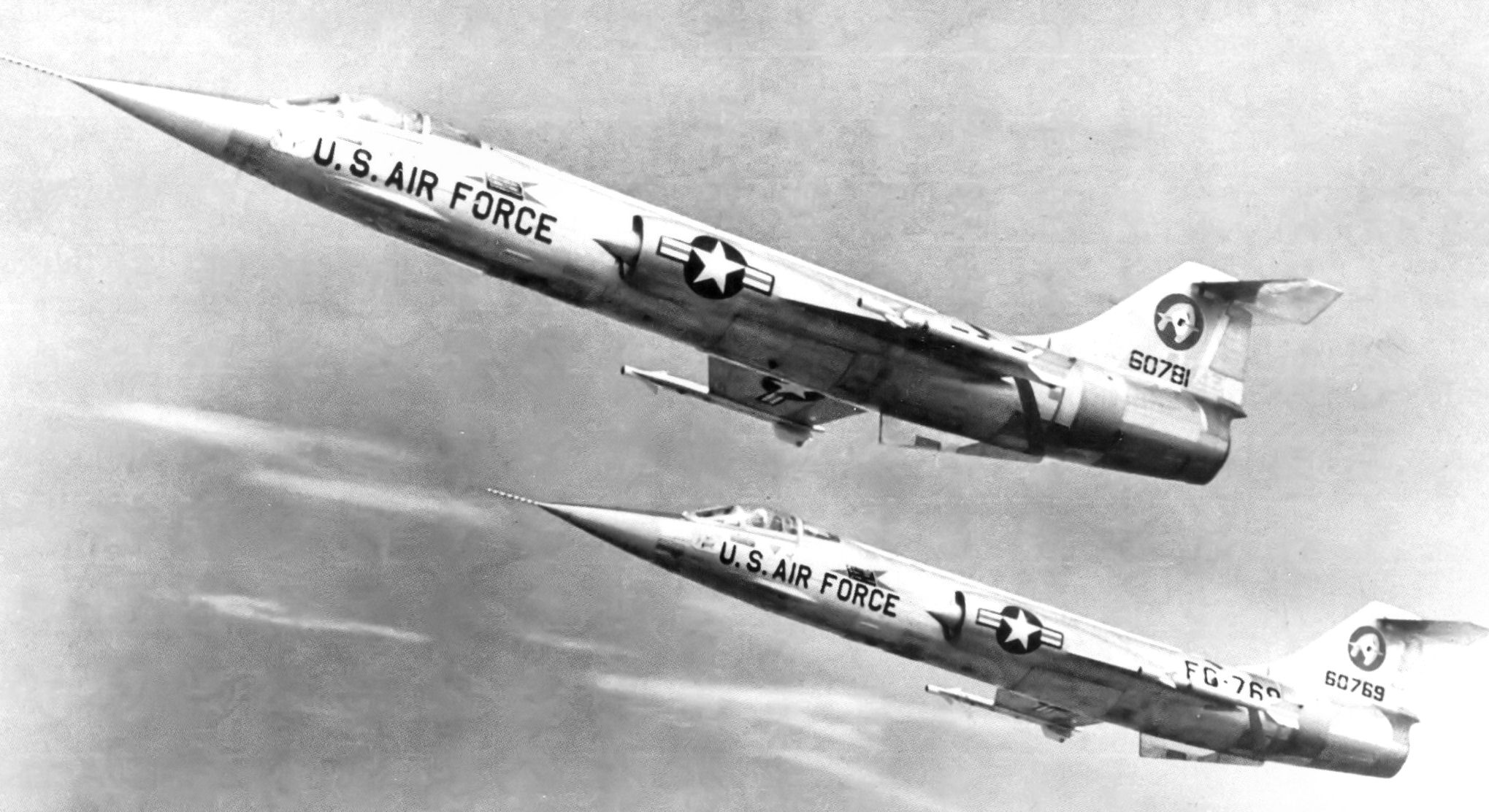
- 1958, a pair of Lockheed F-104A Starfighters from 83d Fighter-Interceptor Squadron, Hamilton AFB.

This is a list of Lockheed F-104 Starfighter variants.

== XF-104 ==
Two prototype aircraft equipped with Wright J65 engines (the J79 was not yet ready); one aircraft equipped with the M61 cannon as an armament test bed. Both aircraft were destroyed in crashes.

== YF-104A ==
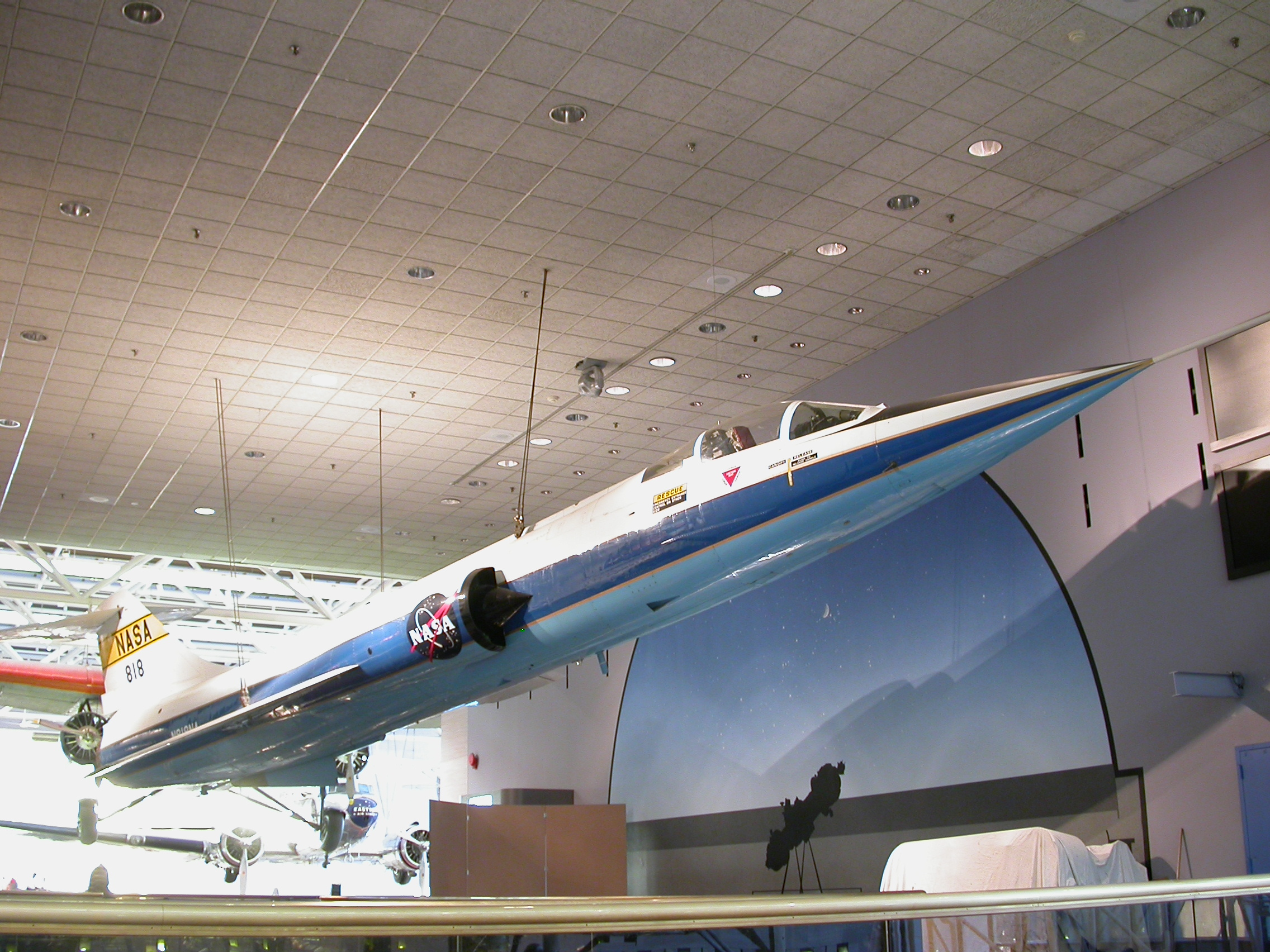
A Lockheed YF-104A, AF ser. no. 55-2961, NASA aircraft number 818. First NASA flight on 27 August 1956, last operational flight on 26 August 1975 – 1,439 flights over this period.

17 pre-production aircraft used for engine, equipment, and flight testing. Most were later converted to F-104A standard.

== F-104A ==
A total of 153 initial production versions were built. The F-104A was in USAF service from 1958 through 1960, then transferred to ANG until 1963 when they were recalled by the USAF Air Defense Command for the 319th and 331st Fighter Interceptor Squadrons. Some were released for export to Jordan, Pakistan, and Taiwan, each of whom used it in combat. In 1967 the 319th F-104As and Bs were re-engined with the J79-GE-19 engines with 17,900 lbf (79.6 kN) of thrust in afterburner; service ceiling with this engine was in excess of 73,000 ft (22,250 m). In 1969, all the F-104A/Bs in ADC service were retired. On 18 May 1958, an F-104A set a world speed record of 1,404.19 mph (2,259.82 km/h).

== NF-104A ==
Three demilitarized F-104A airframes with an additional 6,000 lbf (27 kN) Rocketdyne LR121/AR-2-NA-1 rocket engine and modified systems, used for astronaut training at altitudes up to 120,800 ft (36,820 m).

== QF-104A ==
A total of 22 F-104As converted into radio-controlled drones and test aircraft.

== F-104B ==
Tandem two-seat, dual-control trainer version of F-104A, 26-built. Enlarged rudder and ventral fin, no cannon and reduced internal fuel, but otherwise combat-capable. A few were supplied to Jordan, Pakistan and Taiwan.

== F-104C ==
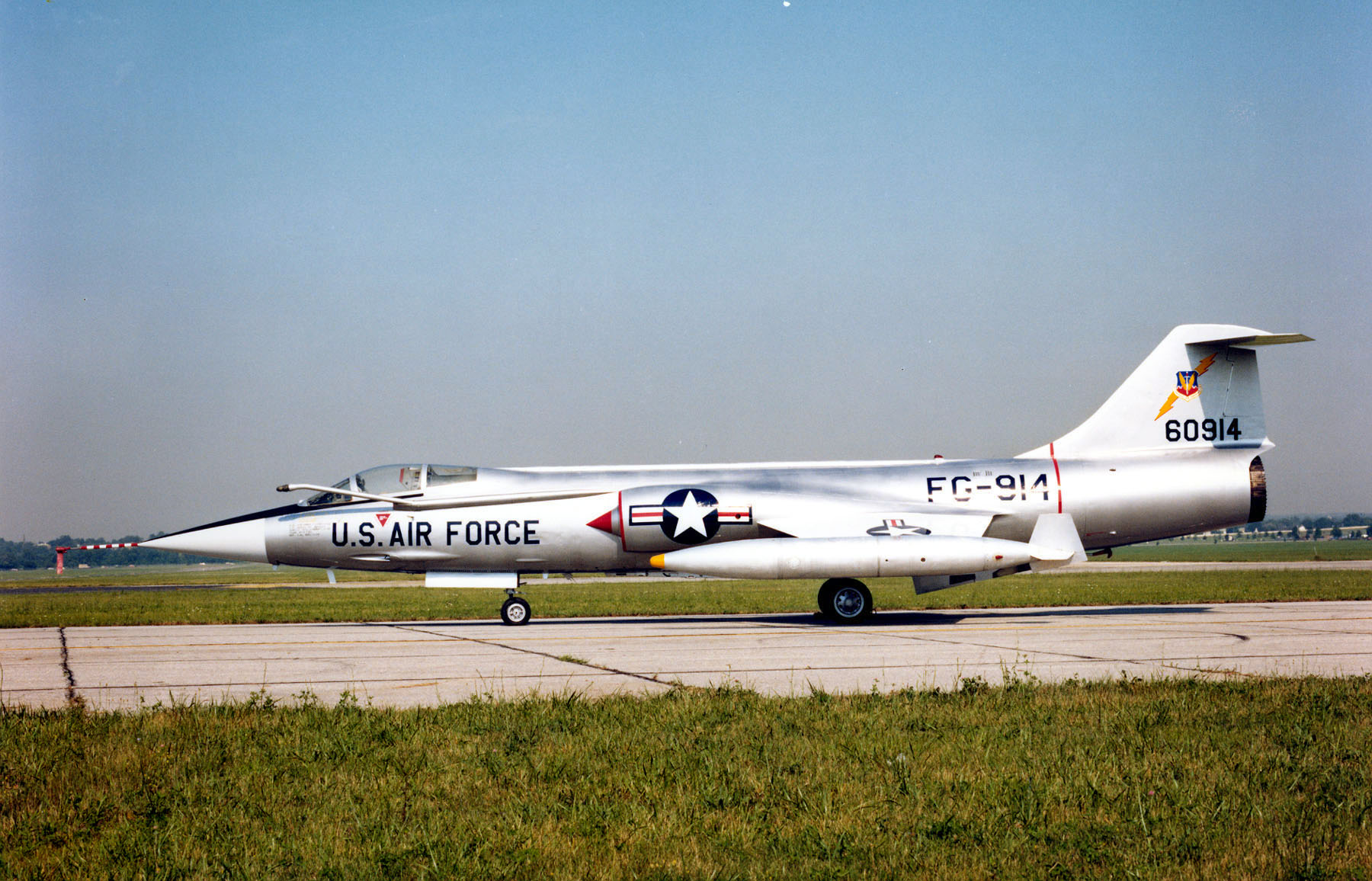
F-104C at the National Museum of the United States Air Force, Wright-Patterson AFB, OH.

Fighter-bomber version for USAF Tactical Air Command, with improved fire-control radar (AN/ASG-14T-2), centerline and two wing pylons (for a total of five), and ability to carry one Mk 28 or Mk 43 nuclear weapon on the centerline pylon. The F-104C also had in-flight refuelling capability. On 14 December 1959, an F-104C set a world altitude record of 103,395 ft (31,515 m), 77 built.

== F-104D ==
Dual-control trainer versions of F-104C, 21 built.

== F-104DJ ==
Dual-control trainer version of F-104J for Japanese Air Self-Defense Force, 20 built by Lockheed and assembled by Mitsubishi.

== F-104F ==
Dual-control trainers based on F-104D, but using the upgraded engine of the F-104G. No radar, and not combat-capable. Produced as interim trainers for the Luftwaffe. All F-104F aircraft were retired by 1971; 30 built.

== F-104G ==
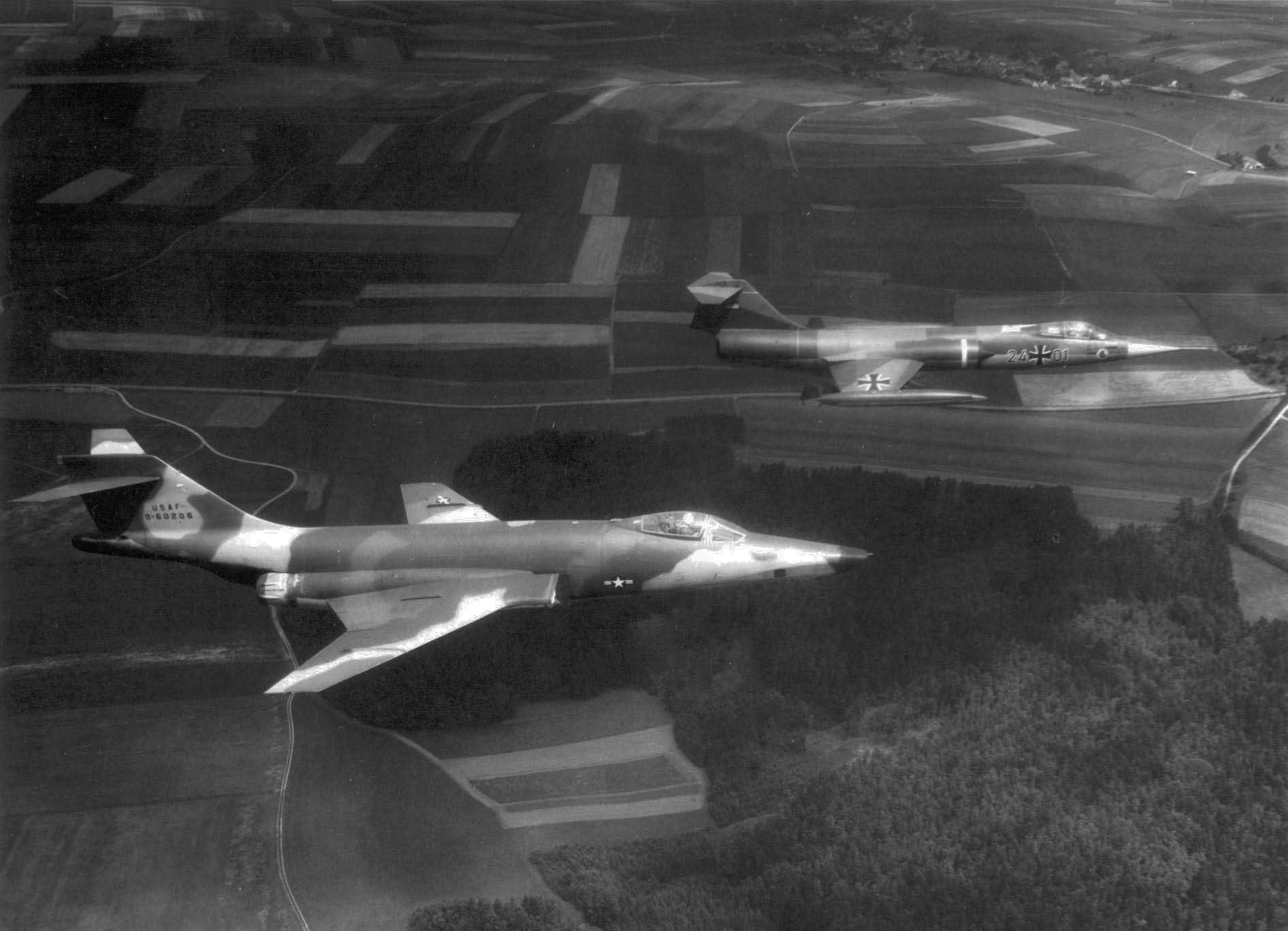
A German RF-104G in flight with a 66th Tactical Reconnaissance Wing McDonnell RF-101C.

1,122 aircraft of the main version produced as multi-role fighter-bombers. Manufactured by Lockheed, and under license by Canadair and a consortium of European companies which included Messerschmitt/MBB, Dornier, Fiat, Fokker and SABCA. The type featured strengthened fuselage and wing structure, increased internal fuel capacity, an enlarged vertical fin, strengthened landing gear with larger tires and revised flaps for improved combat maneuvering. Upgraded avionics included a new Autonetics NASARR F15A-41B radar with air-to-air and ground mapping modes, the Litton LN-3 Inertial Navigation System (the first on a production fighter) and an infrared sight.

=== RF-104G ===
189 tactical reconnaissance models based on F-104G, usually with three KS-67A cameras mounted in the forward fuselage in place of cannon.

=== TF-104G ===
220 combat-capable trainer version of F-104G; no cannon or centerline pylon, reduced internal fuel. One aircraft used by Lockheed as a demonstrator with the civil registration number L104L, was flown by Jackie Cochran to set three women's world speed records in 1964. This aircraft later served in the Netherlands. A pair of two-seat TF-104Gs and a single-seat F-104G joined the Dryden inventory in June 1975.

=== RTF-104G ===
A proposed photoreconnaissance variant of the TF-104G offered to the West German Air Force in the late 1960s with comparable performance to the RF-4E at greatly reduced cost. Did not enter service.

== F-104H ==
Projected export version based on a F-104G with simplified equipment and optical gunsight. Not built.

== F-104J ==
Specialized interceptor version of the F-104G for the Japanese ASDF, built under license by Mitsubishi for the air-superiority fighter role, armed with cannon and four Sidewinders; no strike capability. Some were converted to UF-104J radio-controlled target drones and destroyed. Total of 210 built, three built by Lockheed, 29 built by Mitsubishi from Lockheed-built components and 178 built by Mitsubishi.

== F-104N ==
Three F-104Gs were delivered to NASA in 1963 for use as high-speed chase aircraft. One, piloted by Joe Walker, collided with an XB-70 on 8 June 1966.

== F-104S (Lockheed Model CL-901) ==
F-104S in original camouflage scheme with Sparrow missiles mounted under the wings, c. 1969

Produced mainly by Fiat and Aeritalia (one aircraft was lost before delivery), upgraded for the interception role having NASARR R-21G/H radar with moving target indicator and continuous wave illuminator for SARH missiles (initially AIM-7 Sparrow), two additional wing and two underbelly hardpoints (to give a total of nine), uprated J79-GE-19 engine with 52.8 kN (11,870 lbf) thrust (79.6 kN/17,900 lbf with afterburner), and two additional ventral fins for increased stability at high Mach numbers. Up to two Sparrow; and two, theoretically four or six, Sidewinder missiles were carried on all the hardpoints except the central (underbelly), or seven 340 kg (750 lb) bombs (normally, two-four 227–340 kg/500-750 lb). Range was up to 1,250 km (777 mi) with four tanks, ferry range 2,940 km (1,827 mi). Aircraft allocated to air defence missions had their 20 mm (.79 in) M-61 Vulcan cannon removed. The F-104S was cleared for a higher maximum takeoff weight, allowing it to carry up to 7,500 lb (3,400 kg) of stores; other Starfighters had a maximum external load of 4,000 lb (1,814 kg). With four under wing drop tanks range was up to 780 mi (1,250 km). Production of the F-104S totalled 286, with the Italian Air Force taking delivery of 246 and the Turkish Air Force receiving 40 aircraft.

=== F-104S-ASA ===
(Aggiornamento Sistemi d'Arma – "Weapon Systems Update") – An upgraded F-104S, 147 were modified from existing airframes, with Fiat R21G/M1 radar with frequency hopping, look-down/shoot-down capability, new IFF and weapons delivery computer, and provision for AIM-9L all-aspect Sidewinder and Selenia Aspide missiles. Due to the delays of Aspide integration, the initial version, with Raytheon AIM-7 Sparrows was designated ASA-1. When the Aspide became available, all F-104Ss were upgraded to ASA-2 standard. First flown in 1985 the F-104S-ASA was principally an air-defence aircraft without enhancements to ground attack capabilities and were later modified to interceptor standards (CI) with removal of the 20 mm (.79 in) M-61 Vulcan cannon.

=== F-104S-ASA/M ===
(Aggiornamento Sistemi d'Arma/Modificato – "Weapon Systems Update/Modified") – 49 F-104S-ASA and 15 two-seat TF-104G aircraft upgraded from 1998 to ASA/M standard with GPS, new TACAN and Litton LN-30A2 INS, refurbished airframe, and improved cockpit displays. All strike-related equipment was removed, including the IRST (the small unit known as 'IR-Sight', forward the windshield). The last Starfighters in combat service, the F-104S-ASA/M was withdrawn in October 2004 (the last unit being 10° Gruppo/9° Stormo, Grazzanise), and temporarily replaced by F-16 Fighting Falcons, whilst awaiting delivery of Eurofighter Typhoons.

== CF-104 ==
200 Canadian-built versions, built under license by Canadair and optimized for both nuclear strike and 2-stage-to-orbit payload delivery, having NASARR R-24A radar with air-to-air modes, cannon deleted (restored after 1972), additional internal fuel cell, and Canadian J79-OEL-7 engines with 10,000 lbf (44 kN)/15,800 lbf (70 kN) thrust.

=== CF-104D ===
38 dual-control trainer versions of CF-104, built by Lockheed, but with Canadian J79-OEL-7 engines. Some later transferred to Denmark, Norway and Turkey.

== See also ==
- Lockheed F-104 Starfighter

Related development

- Lockheed XF-104
- Lockheed NF-104A
- Canadair CF-104
- Aeritalia F-104S
- CL-1200 Lancer and X-27

Related lists

- List of fighter aircraft
- List of military aircraft of the United States
