= Goetsenhoven Airfield =

Goetsenhoven Military Airfield
- IATA: none; ICAO: EBTN

Summary
- Airport type: Military
- Operator: Belgian Armed Forces (MRC&I) / Federal Police
- Location: Tienen, Belgium
- Elevation AMSL: 238 ft (73 m)
- Coordinates: 50°46′54″N 004°57′28″E

Map
- Location in Belgium

Runways
Direction	Length		Surface
Direction	m	ft	Surface
17/35	780	2,559	Asphalt
06/24	728	2,388	Asphalt
- Sources: Belgian AIP

Goetsenhoven Airfield (ICAO: EBTN) is a former Belgian Air Force base, located 2 miles (3.2 km) south of Tienen, approximately 42 km (26 miles) east-southeast of Brussels.

The airfield was last used militarily as a training facility for Belgian Air Cadets, equipped with six Piper L21B Super Cubs, and several Schleicher K 8B Gliders.

== History ==
Goetsenhoven Airfield was one of the first airfields of Belgian military aviation. It was built in 1922 as a grass airfield by the Belgian Air Force (Aéronautique Militaire Belge). Its early use was that of observation aircraft of II Group, consisting of 10 Ansaldo A.300 or DH.9 biplanes.

On 1 November 1939, as part of the wartime buildup, three squadrons of British built Fairey Fox III fighter/bombers with Nos. 3 (II Group), 5 (III Group) and 7 (IV Group) squadrons were assigned to the airfield as part of the 2e Régiment d'Aéronautique (2nd Air Regiment-Air Combat) In addition to the combat units, Goetsenhoven was also a Basic Flight School (Ecole de Pilotage Elémentaire) for the Belgian Air Force, equipped with Stampe-Vertongen SV.4s.

== World War II ==
On 10 May 1940, Goetsenhoven was attacked by the Luftwaffe as part of the initial German attack on Belgium, killing several personnel and destroying some aircraft, and was seized by the Wehrmacht a few days later. The Goetsenhoven squadrons hastily retreated to other airfields with their remaining planes. They were eventually evacuated to France. During the occupation of Belgium, the airfield was used by the Luftwaffe as a reserve airfield; no Luftwaffe units were stationed there.

In late 1944, the airfield was attacked by United States Army Air Forces (USAAF) Ninth Air Force Martin B-26 Marauder medium bombers and Republic P-47 Thunderbolts with 500-pound general purpose bombs, unguided rockets, and .50 caliber machine gun sweeps to ensure that any German forces at the base were neutralized. Allied ground forces moved into the Tienen area around 20 October and the first American combat engineer units arrived at the airfield shortly afterward.

The USAAF IX Engineering Command 862d Engineer Aviation Battalion laid down a 3600' all weather pierced steel planking runway at Goetsenhoven, and rehabilitated some of the buildings for use by combat units. On 26 October, the airfield was declared operationally ready and was designated as Advanced Landing Ground "Y-10", also being known as "Le Culot/East Airfield". Shortly after the airfield opened, the 9th AF 371st Fighter Group moved there with P-47 fighters and remained until 20 December.

Once the American combat units moved out, Goetsenhoven became a transport airfield for C-47 Skytrains, which flew frequently in and out of the American controlled airfield, supplying the front line forces with the necessary materiel to support their advance. On return flights to the rear area, casualty evacuation was performed by the transports.

At the end of the war, Goetsenhoven was returned to Belgian control by the Americans on 25 June 1945.

== Postwar use ==
After the war, the metal runway at Goetsenhoven was removed and the airfield was returned to its prewar configuration as a grass airfield. It was reopened in 1950, and became the base field of the ESS (Elementary Flying School). In 1969, flight training was upgraded to the SIAI Marchetti Aermacchi SF.260. Also, two all-weather asphalt runways were laid down on the site, replacing the grass runway.

In 1996, flight training of the Belgian Air Force was centralised at Beauvechain Air Base, and the formal military presence at Goetsenhoven ended.

Besides the EVS during the weekends, the airfield is also used by the local flying club De Wouw, following the closure of the ESS was working with engine and gliders. The field is not open for flying on days that is also used by the Olympia Tiense Wielerschool for the training of young cyclists.

As of 2020, the aeroclub "De Wouw" still operates from its premises on the south side of the field; formerly military hangars on the northwest side are now used by an ultralight flying club. Since the whole area is within the controlled airspace of Beauvechain Air Base, however, civilian flying is subject to strict limitations; basically, operations are limited to weekends.

== See also ==
- Advanced Landing Ground
- Ultralight Flying Club
