= Beauvechain Air Base =

Former air base in Wallonia, Belgium

Beauvechain Air Base (Advanced Landing Ground A-89)
- IATA: none; ICAO: EBBE

Summary
- Airport type: Military
- Operator: Belgian Air Force
- Location: Beauvechain, Wallonia, Belgium
- Built: 1936
- Elevation AMSL: 370 ft (110 m)
- Coordinates: 50°45′28″N 004°46′01″E

Map
- Location in Belgium

Runways
Direction	Length		Surface
Direction	m	ft	Surface
04L/22R	3,074	10,085	Asphalt/concrete
04R/22L	2,450	8,038	Asphalt/concrete
- Sources: Belgian AIP

Beauvechain Air Base (ICAO: EBBE) is a Belgian Air Force military airfield in Belgium, located 6 km (3 miles) south of Beauvechain in Walloon Brabant province, Wallonia, 32 km (20 miles) east-southeast of Brussels.

It is home to the 1st Wing, operating A109BA helicopters, and the Basic Flying Training School, operating SIAI Marchetti SF.260 trainer aircraft.

It is used as a base for the operational helicopter squadrons, and as a training center for pilots. Beauvechain also houses the Wing Meteo and the Air Force Band. It employs 1,100, therefore being the second employer of Walloon Brabant.

== History ==
Beauvechain Air Base was a pre-World War II Belgian Air Force military airfield established in 1936 as "Le Culot Airfield". It was captured during the Battle of Belgium by the invading German Wehrmacht on 10 May 1940, destroying several Hawker Hurricane and Gloster Gladiator aircraft stationed at the airfield.

=== German use during World War II ===
During the occupation of Belgium by Nazi Germany, the facility became a major Luftwaffe air base during the Battle of France. During the battle, two Junkers Ju 88A units Kampfgeschwader 3 and Kampfgeschwader 30 (KG 3; KG 30) supported the offensive, especially the crucial breakthrough at Sedan. Other elements supported the drive to the Swiss border, encircling the French forces on the Maginot Line. When KG 30 moved into France, KG 3 remained at Le Culot, taking part in the Battle of Britain. At the beginning of the battle KG 3 had a total of 108 Ju 88 bombers, of which 88 were combat ready. KG 3 operated during all phases of the battle. In March 1941, it left for bases in Poland in preparation for Operation Barbarossa, the invasion of the Soviet Union.

With KG 3 moved out, the Germans revamped Le Culot with two concrete runways, taxiways, concrete revetments, and a maintenance station including hangars, shops and barracks.

The airfield was placed back on operational status during December 1941 when Aufklärungsgruppe 22 (AKG 22), a Long-range reconnaissance unit arrived with Ju 88s. The unit operated primarily over the North Sea and North Atlantic spotting allied convoys and shipping. It was replaced in April 1942 by AKG 33, which remained until May when it moved to Bordeaux to operate over the Bay of Biscay and North Atlantic.

Le Culot did not host any operational units until November 1943, when Kampfgeschwader 6 (KG 6) arrived from Larissa, Greece with Ju 88s as part of Operation Steinbock, a late war German operation carried out by the Luftwaffe between January and May 1944 against targets in southern England, mainly in and around the London area during the night. kg 6 remained at the base until it moved to Prague. Operation Steinbock attacks from Le Culot continued with Ju 88s from Lehrgeschwader 1 (LG 1) and Kampfgeschwader 30 (KG 30) until the end of July 1944, the last large-scale aerial bombing operation against England. Afterwards only the V1 cruise missiles and V2 ballistic rockets were used for hitting the British Isles.

Le Culot Air Base was a frequent target of USAAF Ninth Air Force Martin B-26 Marauder medium bombers. Also, the Republic P-47 Thunderbolts of Ninth Air Force would be dispatched to perform fighter sweeps over the base after the Marauder raids, especially after Focke-Wulf Fw 190 fighters moved in. After the fighter sweep, the Thunderbolts would meet up with Eighth Air Force heavy bombers returning from Germany and provide fighter escort back to England. Le Culot was also attacked by Eighth Air Force Boeing B-17 Flying Fortress heavy bombers in early 1944, causing severe damage to both the airfield and station.

=== Allied use ===
After the German forces were removed from the Beauvechain area in early September 1944, No. 126 Wing RAF of No. 83 Group RAF - 2nd Tactical Air Force (Canadian Fighter Wing) utilized base from Sept.20th to Oct.1st to provide air cover for Arnhem and Nijmegen (Operation Market Garden tail end). This was designated B68 ALG Le Culot - until taken over by Americans at end of October and re-designated A89 ALG.

Combat engineers of the United States Army Air Forces IX Engineering Command 846th Engineer Aviation Regiment repaired the damaged airfield and applied numerous patches to the two concrete runways and taxiways of the field. The airfield was severely damaged from the Allied bombing attacks while in German hands as well as by the Germans as they withdrew, and it took nearly six weeks to make the airfield operationally ready for combat units. It was opened on 28 October, being designated as Advanced Landing Ground A-89 or "Le Culot Airfield".

The American Ninth Air Force used the base for several units from 22 October 1944 until closing the base in June 1946. Known units assigned were:

- 373d Fighter Group, 22 October 1944 – 11 March 1945 (P-47)
- 36th Fighter Group, 27 October 1944 – 26 March 1945 (P-47)
- 322d Bombardment Group, March 1945 – June 1945 (B-26)

After combat ended in May 1945, Le Culot was used as a relief distribution base, with the Allies flying in food, clothing and other needs, and using the base to distribute these supplies in Belgium and other occupied areas in the region. The airfield was returned to Belgian control in December 1946.

=== Postwar/current ===
After being returned to Belgian control, the base was totally rebuilt, as the war had destroyed the base almost completely.

The wartime Belgian Supermarine Spitfire flying squadrons created inside the RAF were relocated to Beauvechain, where they formed on 1 February 1948 as the 1st Fighter Wing, including four squadrons. Various units moved in and out of the base over the next 30 years.

The first F-16 Fighting Falcon arrived in Beauvechain in January 1979. The 1st Fighter Wing was disbanded on 4 March 1996 and its squadrons were relocated to Florennes Air Base and Kleine Brogel Air Base.

The 1st Wing was formed as a flight training unit when all training squadrons relocated from Goetsenhoven and Brustem to Beauvechain in 1996. The 1st Wing was disbanded as a training unit and recreated as a helicopter unit in September 2010.

Beauvechain is the home of the First Wing Historical Centre, a military museum which has a number of historic aircraft on display.

== See also ==
- Advanced Landing Ground
