= French war planning 1920–1940 =

Dyle–Breda plan/Breda variant
- Part of The Second World War
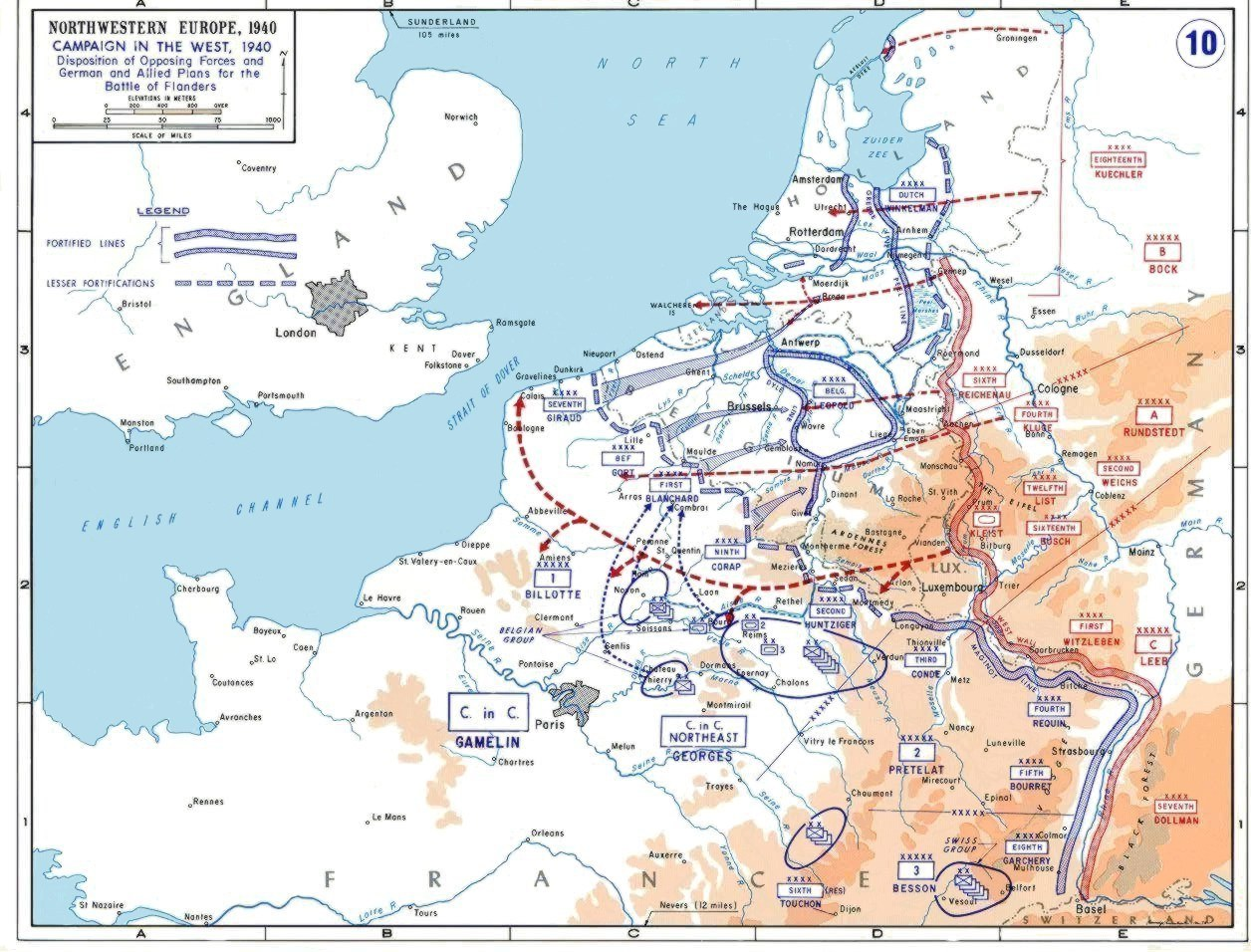
- Western Front campaign, 1940
- Operational scope: Strategic
- Location: South-west Netherlands, central Belgium, northern France; 50°51′00″N 04°21′00″E
- Planned: 1940
- Planned by: Maurice Gamelin
- Commanded by: Alphonse Georges
- Objective: Defence of the Netherlands, Belgium and France
- Date: 10 May 1940
- Executed by: French 1st Army Group; British Expeditionary Force; Belgian Army
- Outcome: Defeat

The Dyle plan or Plan D was the plan of the commander-in-chief of the French Army, Général d'armée Maurice Gamelin, to defeat a German attempt to invade France through Belgium. The Dyle (Dijle) river is 86 km (53 mi) long, from Houtain-le-Val through Flemish Brabant and Antwerp; Gamelin intended French, British and Belgian troops to halt a German invasion force along the line of the river. The Franco-Belgian Accord of 1920 had co-ordinated communication and fortification efforts of both armies. After the German Remilitarization of the Rhineland on 7 March 1936, the Belgian government abrogated the accord and substituted a policy of strict neutrality, now that the German Army (Heer) was on the German–Belgian border.

French doubts about the Belgian Army led to uncertainty about whether French troops could move fast enough into Belgium to avoid an encounter battle and fight a defensive battle from prepared positions. The Escaut plan/Plan E and Dyle plan/Plan D were devised for a forward defence in Belgium, along with a possible deployment on the French–Belgian border to Dunkirk. Gamelin chose the Escaut plan, then substituted Plan D for an advance to the line of the Dyle, which was 43–50 mi (70–80 km) shorter. Some officers at Grand Quartier Général (GQG, general headquarters of the French Army) doubted that the French Army could arrive before the Germans.

German dissatisfaction with Fall Gelb (Case Yellow), the campaign plan against France, Belgium and the Netherlands, increased over the winter of 1939–1940. On 10 January 1940, a German aircraft landed at Mechelen in Belgium, carrying plans for the invasion. The Mechelen Incident was a catalyst for the doubts about Fall Gelb to become overwhelming and led to the Manstein plan, a bold, almost reckless, gamble for an attack further south through the Ardennes. The attack on the Low Countries became a decoy to lure the Allied armies northwards, more easily to outflank them from the south.

Over the winter of 1939–1940, Gamelin altered Plan D with the Breda variant, an advance into the Netherlands to Breda in North Brabant. The Seventh Army, the most powerful element of the French strategic reserve, was added to the 1st Army Group close to the coast, to rush to the Scheldt Estuary and link with the Dutch Army at Tilburg or Breda. Some of the best divisions of the French army were moved north, when elite units of the German Army were being transferred south for the new version of Fall Gelb, an invasion through the Ardennes.

== Background ==
=== French defence policy ===
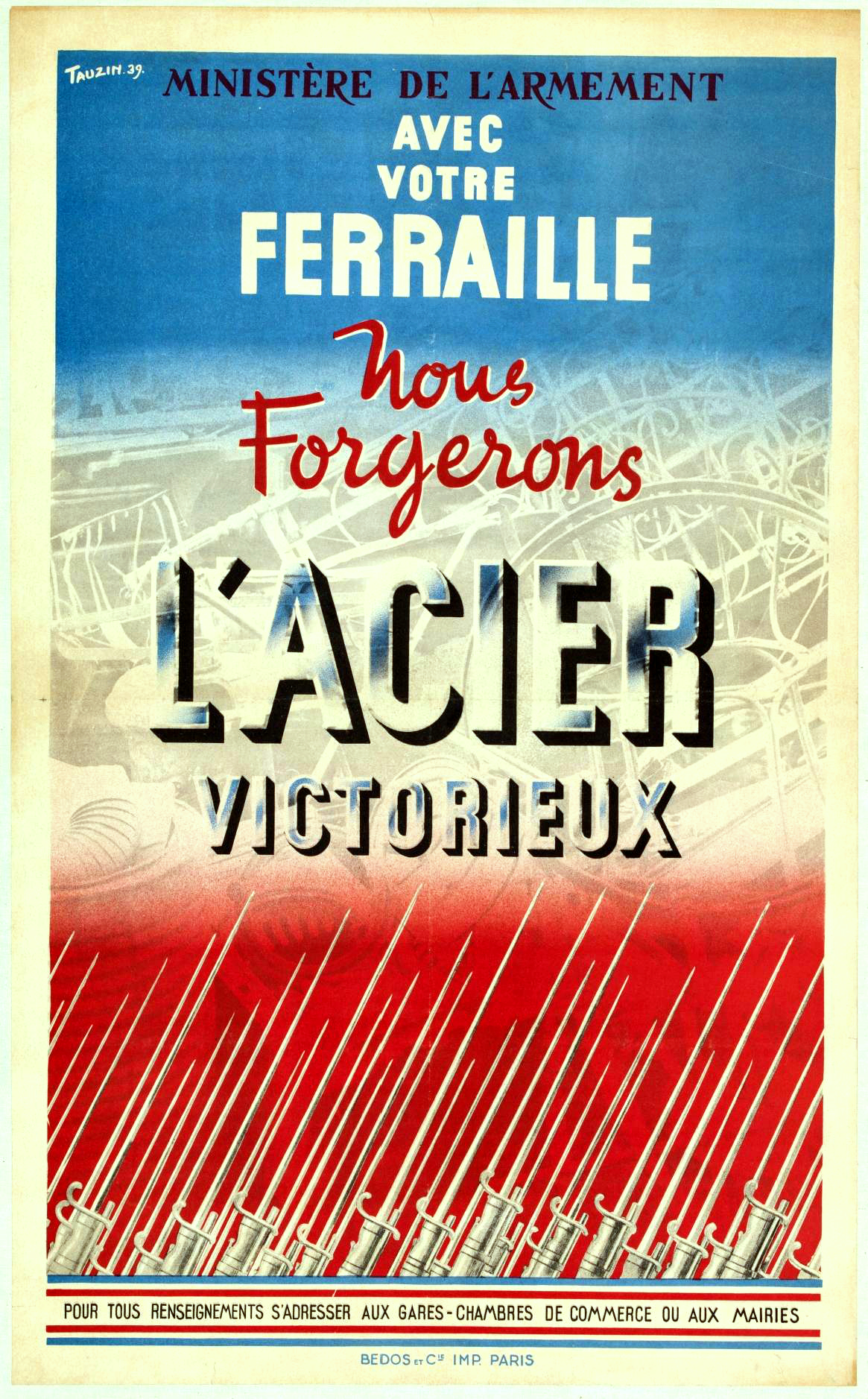
1939 poster from the Ministry of Armament, "With your scrap we shall forge the steel of victory!"

After the territorial changes in the Treaty of Versailles (28 June 1919) transferred the provinces of Alsace and Lorraine to France, natural resources, industry and population close to the frontier, vital for the prosecution of another war of exhaustion, meant that the French army would not be able to gain time by retreating into the interior as it had in 1914. By the 1930s, the importance of the two provinces and north-eastern France to the French economy had grown. The French Army was responsible for frontier protection under the Conseil supérieur de la guerre (CSG, Supreme War Council), which was revived on 23 January 1920.

By 1922, two schools of thought had emerged, one led by General Edmond Buat that advocated the building of continuous fortifications along the frontier for a relatively static defence and one supported by Marshal Ferdinand Foch and Marshal Philippe Pétain, which wanted fortified regions to be built as centres of resistance for offensive action. Armies would manoeuvre around the centres until the most favourable time and conditions for attack. By the end of 1922, majority opinion in the CSG favoured a system that could be used offensively and defensively.

=== Manpower ===
By 1918, French conscripts were receiving no more than three months' training and after the war, it was considered that the size of the army should be determined by the number of divisions needed for security. The number of professional soldiers and conscripts necessary was derived by multiplication and the quantity of men was more important than their education or training. In 1920, the CSG decided on 41 active divisions, plus five Algerian and three colonial divisions, with a mobilisation potential of 80 divisions. The government imposed a 32-division limit with 150,000 full-time soldiers but in 1926, the government set the size of the army at 20 active divisions, with 106,000 professional soldiers, to comprise a reservoir of trained men on which reservists could form a mobilised wartime army. Reducing the size of the active army allowed a reduction in the number of conscripts and the term of compulsory service from two years to one year by 1928. In 1928 a comprehensive series of laws had been passed for the recruitment and organisation of the army, which determined its peacetime nature; the cadre of professionals maintained the army ready for the mobilisation of a mass of reservists.

The French army expected that another war would be won by a mass army, even if it was full of short service and sketchily trained men; the period of twelve-month conscription lasted from 1928 until 1935. A force of one-year conscripts was accepted by the army, because a big, fairly well-trained army in wartime was considered more important than a highly trained, quick-responding and offensively-minded army in peacetime. From 220,000 to 230,000 men were trained each year, half being called up every six months, the previous group moving to the active army as the new men began training. The 106,000-man regular army was capable only of manning frontier defences, training recruits and providing planning staffs; when the garrison in the Rhineland returned, the army lost the capacity for independent or limited action in Europe without mobilisation. In the context of the later 1920s, the decline in the readiness of the standing army did not seem to be a disadvantage. By the time the one-year law affected numbers in 1932, there were 358,000 soldiers in metropolitan France, of whom 232,000 were sufficiently trained for operations. By 1933, there were 320,000 soldiers in mainland France, with 226,000 having had more than six months' training; the French army was only twice the size of the German Reichswehr, which comprised highly trained soldiers, because of the long term period of service imposed by the treaty of Versailles.

=== Belgium ===
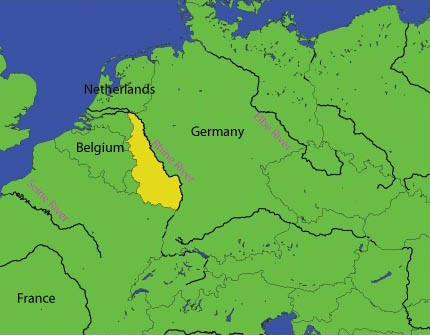
The Rhineland as defined by the Treaty of Versailles, part contiguous with the Belgian frontier.

In September 1920, the CSG made a strategic decision that the defence of the northern frontier must begin with a rush into Belgium. The French army never deviated from the belief that the loss of agricultural, mining and industrial resources in 1914 could never be repeated. In September, the Franco-Belgian Accord of 1920 was signed for military co-operation; if international tension increased, the Belgians would request assistance and the French would send an army to the Belgian–German border, making it the main line of French resistance to a German attack. As the policy was studied, it became clear that a force moving to the Belgian–German border would have to be mobile if it were to forestall the Germans for a defensive battle from prepared positions.

Motorised transport would be necessary to rush forward French troops, then ferry engineer stores to fortify their positions. The French army created mobile fortification parks stocked with engineer stores for fortification, ready to be moved by road and rail but if the Belgian army was overwhelmed, the French might be forced into an encounter battle and a war of movement in the central Belgian plain. French strategy was to avoid a decisive battle early on, after the disaster of the Battle of the Frontiers in 1914 but the necessity of avoiding a war on French soil meant that a forward move could not be avoided.

=== Maginot Line ===
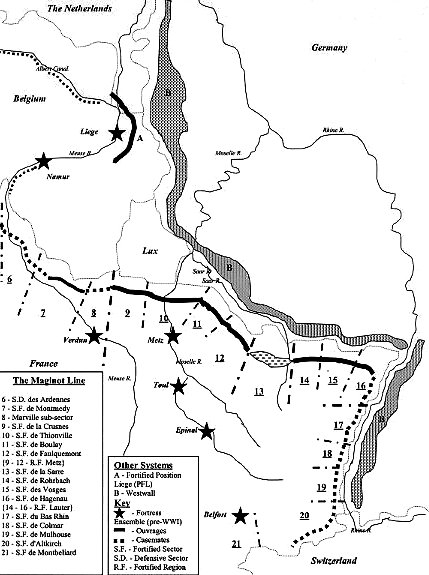
Map of the principal fortified section of the Maginot Line

Studies made by the General Staff in 1919 were reported to the CSG in 1920 and a commission of 1922, chaired by Marshal Joseph Joffre reported in December 1925, in favour of centres of resistance built in peacetime, not a continuous fortified front. From 17 December 1926 to 12 October 1927, the Frontier Defence Commission reported to the CSG that fortifications should be built from Metz to Thionville and Longwy, to protect the Moselle Valley and the mineral resources and industry of Lorraine. The area around the Lauter, the most north-eastern part of the common border with Germany, should be fortified as an obvious invasion route but there was no need to fortify the Rhine, because of the Vosges mountains further west and the small number of railways on the German side. Belfort was near the Swiss frontier and partly protected by the Rhine but there was an avenue of invasion to the west, which should be protected. The commission gave emphasis to defence against a surprise attack, with the limited objective of capturing the Metz and Lauter areas.

The commission recommended that priority be given to protecting the resources and industries of Lorraine that were vital for the French economy and would become more important for a war economy. The nature of fixed defences was debated during the 1920s, with advocates of the offensive use of fortifications, deep or shallow defences and centralised and decentralised designs. On 12 October 1927, the CSG adopted the system recommended by Pétain, of large and elaborately fortified defences from Metz to Thionville and Longwy, at Lauter and Belfort, on the north-east frontier, with covered infantry positions between the main fortifications. André Maginot, the Minister of War (1922–1924, 1929–1930 and 1931–1932) became the driving force for obtaining the money to fortify the north-eastern frontier, sufficient to resist a German invasion for three weeks, to give time for the French army to mobilise. Work began in 1929 on the Région Fortifiée de Metz (Metz Fortified Region) through the Moselle valley to the Nied at Teting-sur-Nied, then the Région Fortifiée de Lauter, east of Hagenau from Bitche to the Rhine, the extension of the Metz region to Longuyon and the Lauter river region from Bitche to the Sarre (Saar) at Wittring.

Requirements for the fortifications were natural cover, sites nearby for observation posts, the minimum of dead ground, a maximum arc of fire, ground suitable for anti-tank obstacles and infantry positions and ground on which paved roads could be built, to eliminate wheel marks. Maisons Fortes were to be built near the frontier as permanently garrisoned works, whose men would alert the army, blow bridges and erect roadblocks, for which materials were dumped. About 1.5–2 mi (2.4–3.2 km) back were concrete Avant-postes with permanent garrisons armed with 47 mm or 65 mm guns, intended to delay an attacker so that buried casemates and ouvrages (fortresses) further back could be manned. Artificial obstacles of 4 to 6 rows of upright railway line, 10 ft (3.0 m)-long set in concrete and of random depth and covered by barbed wire. A barbed wire obstruction 20 ft (6.1 m) further back covered a field of anti-tank mines overlooked by twin machine-guns and anti-tank guns in casemates. The casemates were distributed in series and were the only defensive works along the Rhine; on other stretches, casemates were interspersed with ouvrages, every 3–5 mi (4.8–8.0 km). Interval Troops of infantry, gunners, engineers and mechanised light cavalry with field artillery, could manoeuvre between the fortifications, advancing to defend casemate approaches to relieve outposts or retiring to protect fortress entrances; the troops provided continuity, depth and mobility to the static defences. (Note: The main fortifications were single- and double-casemates, dug into hills from 0.25–1.25 mi (0.40–2.01 km) apart, with firing chambers containing machine-guns, anti-tank guns to enfilade the anti-tank and anti-infantry obstacles further forward. An upper floor was roofed by 5–12 ft (1.5–3.7 m) of concrete and living quarters for 25–35 men were built below, with walls 2–5 ft (0.61–1.52 m) thick behind an earth covering; a trench 10 ft (3.0 m) deep surrounded by barbed wire and grenade-throwers protected the work. Power came from diesel engines and the largest forts (ouvrages) had 1,000–1,200 infantry, gunners and engineers.)

=== Ardennes ===
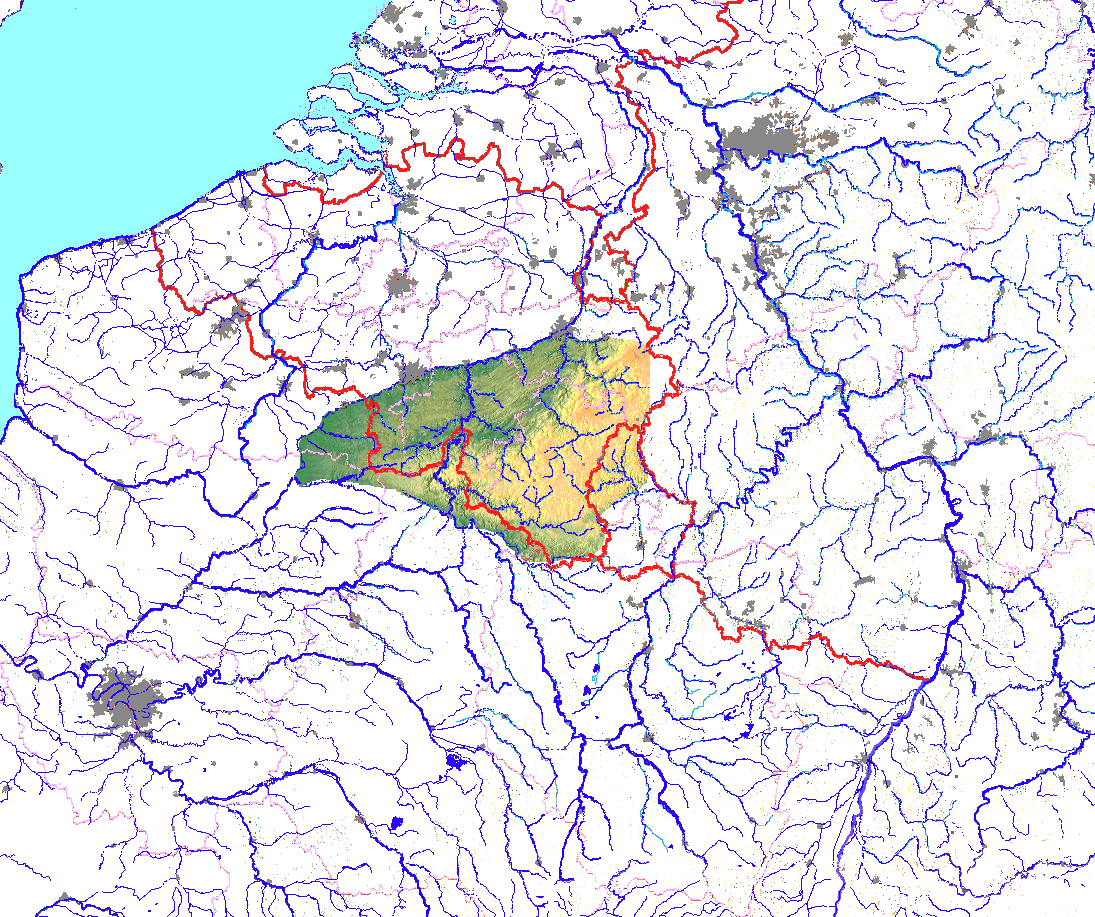
Map showing the Ardennes

The Ardennes was considered to be easily defended and in 1927 the Guillaumat Commission concluded that the few, narrow serpentine roads, through wooded hills could be blocked easily with felled trees, minefields and roadblocks. The swift advance of a large force, particularly a road-bound one, through natural and artificial obstacles, could be easily made slow and arduous. Once an invader was through the Ardennes, the depth and width of the river Meuse made it a considerable obstacle. The resources and equipment needed to use the Ardennes route would take so long that the French army expected to have ample time to send reinforcements.

In 1934 Pétain called the area "not dangerous" and in 1936 Gamelin and the Belgian chief of staff, General Charles Cumont, decided the Ardennes were not vulnerable if the French held the Arlon shoulder and the Belgians the opposite one at Liège. Compared to the terrain and resources behind the north-eastern border and the lack of defensible ground on the northern frontier, the connecting ground of the Ardennes was less vulnerable to attack. (It was expected that a German advance would take nine days to reach the Meuse but in 1940 it took under three days.)

=== Northern border ===
Course of the Maginot Line and the defences along the Belgian borders.

The CSG considered the defence of the frontier from Luxembourg to Dunkirk to be the most difficult and inseparable from the defence of the north-east border with Germany. Fortifying the north-eastern frontier would economise on troops, allowing a larger force to operate on the northern border with Belgium. In the north, the flat and open country on the Franco-Belgian border would need far more extensive fortification than the hill country of Alsace and Lorraine and the high water table would mean that defences would have to be built upwards rather than dug down. A fortified defence in depth would be impractical because the industrial conurbation of Lille, Tourcoing, Roubaix and Valenciennes and its railway communications, obstructed the construction of a prepared battlefield with barbed wire, trenches and tank traps. Along with the lack of geographical obstacles, there were many roads and railways straight to Paris. Fortifying the frontier might also create doubts about French intentions among the Belgians, when the Belgian route was the obvious avenue of invasion, pointing at Paris. From May 1920, the CSG considered Belgium the main route of a possible invasion, particularly as the fortification of the north-eastern frontier would deprive German planners of an alternative and force them into a version of the 1914 invasion.

== Prelude ==
=== Escaut plan/Plan E, 1939–1940 ===
On the French declaration of war on 3 September 1939, French military strategy had been settled, taking in analysis of geography, resources and manpower. The French army would defend on the right and advance into Belgium on the left, to fight forward of the French frontier. The extent of the forward move was dependent on events, which were complicated in 1936 by the Belgian repudiation of the accord of 1920. The Belgian declaration of neutrality made the Belgian government reluctant to co-operate openly with France but it did communicate information on Belgian defences. By May 1940, there had been an exchange of the general nature of French and Belgian defence plans but little co-ordination, especially against a German offensive, westwards through Luxembourg and the east of Belgium. The French expected Germany to breach Belgian neutrality first, thus providing a pretext for French intervention or for the Belgians to request support when an invasion was imminent. Most of the French mobile forces were assembled along the Belgian border, ready to make a quick move forward and take up defensive positions before the Germans arrived.

An early appeal for help might give the French time to reach the German–Belgian frontier but there were three feasible defensive lines further back. There was a practicable line from Givet, to Namur, across the Gembloux Gap (la trouée de Gembloux), Wavre, Louvain and along the Dyle river to Antwerp, later termed the Dyle plan or Plan D, which could be reached and was 43–50 mi (70–80 km) shorter than the alternatives. A second possibility was a line from the French border to Condé, Tournai, along the Escaut (Scheldt) to Ghent and thence to Zeebrugge on the North Sea coast, possibly further along the Scheldt (Escaut) to Antwerp, which became Escaut plan/Plan E. The third potential defensive line was along field defences along the French border from Luxembourg to Dunkirk. For the first fortnight of the war, Maurice Gamelin, General of the army and Commander-in-chief of the French Armed Forces, favoured Plan E because of the example of the fast German advances in Poland after the invasion of 1 September 1939. Gamelin and the other French commanders doubted that they could advance any further forward before the Germans arrived and in late September, Gamelin issued General Gaston Billotte, the commander of the 1st Army Group, a directive for

assuring the integrity of the national territory and defending without withdrawing the position of resistance organised along the frontier....

The 1st Army Group had permission to enter Belgium and deploy along the Escaut, according to Plan E. On 24 October, Gamelin directed that an advance beyond the Escaut could not succeed unless the French moved fast enough to forestall the Germans.

=== Allied intelligence ===
By October 1939, the Germans had prepared Fall Gelb (Case Yellow) for an offensive in the west over the Belgian plain. The intention was to inflict a huge defeat on the Allies and occupy as much of the Netherlands, Belgium and northern France as possible; to conduct an air war against Britain and to protect the Ruhr against an Allied invasion of Germany. Several times during the long, cold winter of 1939–1940, Hitler ordered the plan to be implemented, with several tip-offs reaching the Allies through agents and Ultra signals intelligence. A warning that the German offensive would begin on 12 November was received, with the main panzer effort to be made against the Low Countries (Belgium and the Netherlands) and the Allied forces were alerted. It was later discovered that Adolf Hitler, had ordered the Wehrmacht to a state of readiness on 5 November but cancelled it on 7 November. Several other German alerts eluded Allied military intelligence and Operation Weserübung the German invasion of Denmark and Norway took the Allies by surprise. An agent reported that the German invasion in the west was set for mid-December and was received from a Czech source in the Abwehr (German military intelligence); another Allied alert was called after reports that the attack would begin on 13 January. Hitler ordered the attack on 17 January and then postponed it again. French and British intelligence were certain that the Germans could begin an invasion quickly and that there would be little time after the first German move forward, to discover the time and the place.

=== Mechelen incident ===
On 10 January 1940 a German aircraft made a forced landing near Mechelen in Belgium. The aircraft carried an officer passenger with the Luftwaffe's plans for an offensive through central Belgium to the North Sea. The documents were seized by the Belgian authorities and passed on to Allied intelligence, but they were thought to be a plant. In the April full moon period, another Allied alert was called in case of an attack on the Low Countries or only the Netherlands, an offensive through the Low Countries, outflanking the Maginot Line from the north, an attack on the Maginot Line or an invasion through Switzerland. No contingency anticipated a German attack through the Ardennes. The Germans assumed that the captured documents had reinforced the Allied appreciation of their intentions, and on 30 January, some details of Aufmarschanweisung N°3, Fall Gelb were amended. On 24 February, the main German effort was moved south to the Ardennes. Twenty divisions (including seven panzer and three motorised) were transferred from Heeresgruppe B (Army Group B) opposite The Netherlands and Belgium to Heeresgruppe A (Army Group A) facing the Ardennes. French intelligence uncovered a transfer of German divisions from the Saar to the north of the Moselle but failed to detect the redeployment from the Dutch border to the Eiffel–Moselle area.

=== Dyle plan/Plan D, 1940 ===
By late 1939, the Belgians had improved the defences along the Albert Canal and increased the readiness of the army; Gamelin and GQG began to consider the possibility of advancing further than the Escaut. By November, GQG had decided that a defence along the Dyle Line was feasible, despite the doubts of General Alphonse Georges, the commander of the North-Eastern Front, about reaching the Dyle before the Germans. The British had been lukewarm about an advance into Belgium, but Gamelin talked them round, and on 9 November, the Dyle plan was adopted. On 17 November, a session of the Supreme War Council decided that it was essential to occupy the Dyle Line, and Gamelin issued a directive that day detailing a line from Givet to Namur, the Gembloux Gap, Wavre, Louvain and Antwerp. For the next four months, the Dutch and Belgian armies laboured over their defences, the British Expeditionary Force (BEF, General Lord Gort) expanded, and the French army received more equipment and training. (Note: Gamelin also considered a move towards Breda in the Netherlands. If the Allies prevented a German occupation of the Netherlands, the ten divisions of the Dutch army would join the Allied armies, North Sea communications would be protected and the Germans denied air bases for attacks on Britain.)

In May 1940, the 1st Army Group was responsible for the defence of France from the Channel coast to the west end of the Maginot Line. The Seventh Army (Général d'armée Henri Giraud), BEF, First Army (Général d'armée Georges Blanchard) and Ninth Army (Général d'armée André Corap) were ready to advance to the Dyle Line by pivoting on the right (southern) Second Army. (Note: It is a French convention to list military forces from left to right.) The Seventh Army would take over west of Antwerp, ready to move into the Netherlands, and the Belgians were expected to delay a German advance at the Albert Canal and then retire to the Dyle, from Antwerp to Louvain. On the Belgian right, the BEF was to defend about 12 mi (20 km) of the Dyle from Louvain to Wavre with nine divisions and the First Army on the right of the BEF was to hold 22 mi (35 km) with ten divisions, from Wavre across the Gembloux Gap to Namur. The gap from the Dyle to Namur north of the Sambre, with Maastricht and Mons on either side, had few natural obstacles and was a traditional route of invasion, leading straight to Paris.

The Ninth Army would take post south of Namur, along the Meuse to the left (northern) flank of the Second Army, which was the right (eastern) flank army of the 1st Army Group, holding the line from Pont à Bar 9.7 km (6 mi) west of Sedan to Longuyon. GQG considered that the Second and Ninth armies had the easiest task of the army group since they were dug in on the west bank of the Meuse on ground that was easily defended and behind the Ardennes and would have plenty of warning of a German attack in the centre of the French front. After the transfer of the Seventh Army to the 1st Army Group, seven divisions remained behind the Second and Ninth armies and other divisions could be moved from behind the Maginot Line. All but one division were either side of the junction of the two armies, GQG being more concerned about a possible German attack past the north end of the Maginot Line and then south-east through the Stenay Gap for which the divisions behind the Second Army were well placed.

==== Breda variant ====
If the Allies could control the Scheldt estuary, supplies could be transported to Antwerp by ship and contact established with the Dutch army along the river. On 8 November, Gamelin directed that a German invasion of the Netherlands must not be allowed to pass round the west of Antwerp by gaining the south bank of the Scheldt. The left flank of the 1st Army Group was reinforced by the Seventh Army, containing some of the best and most mobile French divisions, which moved from the general reserve by December. The role of the army was to occupy the south bank of the Scheldt, to be ready to move into Holland and protect the estuary, by holding the north bank along the Beveland Peninsula (now the Walcheren–Zuid-Beveland–Noord-Beveland peninsula) in the "Holland Hypothesis". On 12 March 1940, Gamelin discounted dissenting opinions at GQG and decided that the Seventh Army would advance as far as Breda, to link with the Dutch. Georges was told that the Seventh Army role on the left flank of the Dyle manoeuvre would be linked to it and Georges notified Billotte that if it were ordered to cross into the Netherlands, the left flank of the army group was to advance to Tilburg if possible and certainly to Breda. The Seventh Army was to take post between the Belgian and Dutch armies, by passing the Belgians along the Albert Canal and then turning east, a distance of 109 mi (175 km), against German armies only 56 mi (90 km) distant from Breda. On 16 April, Gamelin also made provision for a German invasion of only the Netherlands by changing the area to be reached by the Seventh Army. The Escaut plan was to be followed only if the Germans forestalled the French move into Belgium.

== Battle ==
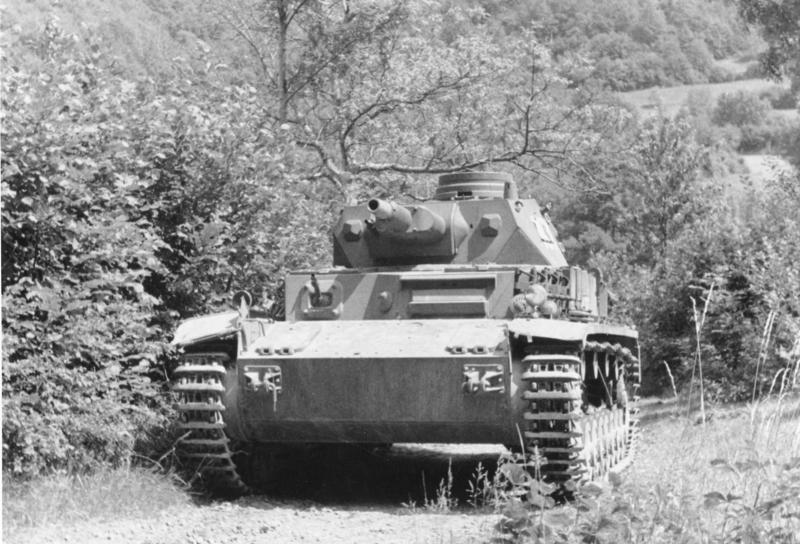
German Panzer IV (photographed on 22 June 1940)

From 1:00 a.m., GQG received information from Brussels and Luxembourg, that the German invasion was about to begin and at 4:35 a.m., the invasion of France and the Low Countries commenced. Gamelin was woken at 6:30 a.m. and ordered the Dyle plan to start. Around dawn on 10 May, German bombers attacked targets in the Netherlands and began to drop parachutists onto airfields. Dutch, French and British aircraft attacked the Luftwaffe on the ground and in the air but several airfields were captured. The French Seventh Army drove forward on the northern flank and advanced elements reached Breda on 11 May.

By this time, the Germans had captured the north-eastern frontier provinces of the Netherlands, were advancing on The Hague (Den Haag) and fighting in Rotterdam. The French found that the Moerdijk bridges had been captured by German paratroops, cutting the link between southern and northern Holland, forcing the Dutch Army to retire northwards towards Amsterdam and Rotterdam. The paratroopers held the bridges until Wehrmacht troops arrived. The French collided with the 9th Panzer Division and the advance of the 25th Motorised Infantry Division (25e Division d'Infanterie Motorisée) was stopped by German infantry, tanks and Junkers Ju 87 Stuka dive-bombers.

The 1e Division Légère Mécanisée (1st Mechanised Light Division) was forced to retreat as the French heavy tanks were still on trains south of Antwerp. The Breda variant had been thwarted in fewer than two days and on 12 May, Gamelin ordered the Seventh Army to cancel the plan and cover Antwerp, retiring from the Bergen op Zoom–Turnhout Canal line 20 mi (32 km) from Antwerp, to Lierre 10 mi (16 km) away. On 13 May, more German forces were landed at Den Haag and Rotterdam, the German army broke through the Dutch at Wageningen on the north side of the Waal and pushed the French Seventh Army back from Breda to Herentals and Bergen op Zoom, where they were met by Belgian troops retreating from Turnhout. By 14 May, much of the Netherlands had been overrun and the Seventh Army found that fighting in the close country among the canals of southern Holland and north-western Belgium proved costly against the German Combined arms tactics.

Next day, Dutch resistance continued in Zeeland as German troops advanced in South Beveland and Walcheren but the government surrendered at 11:00 a.m. Two divisions of the Seventh Army remained to hold Zeeland and two held Antwerp as the rest of the army retreated to the south. On 15 May, the rest of the Seventh Army retreated from South Beveland under attack from the Luftwaffe and the Belgian army prepared to retire through Antwerp to hold the Scheldt Estuary and a line south along the Willebrook Canal to Brussels. The Seventh Army kept three divisions on the south side of the Scheldt Estuary on 17 May and the Belgians began to retreat from Antwerp towards the Scheldt; Brussels and Mechelen fell to the Germans that evening.

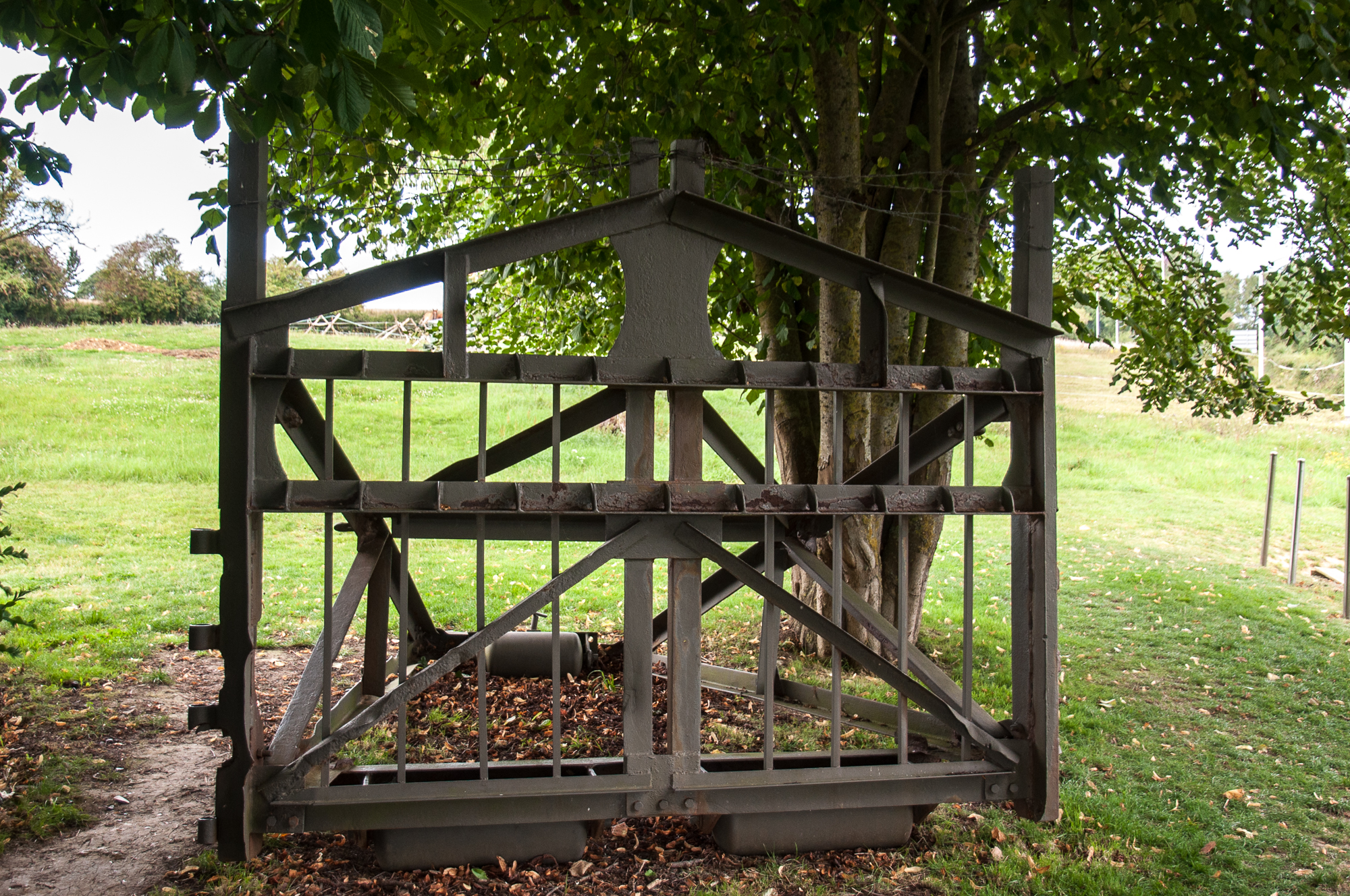
Cointet-element at St Côme du mont

In Belgium, the Albert Canal defence line was based on Fort Ében-Émael. German attacks began at dawn on 10 May, dive-bombers and paratroops attacking the fort. By noon on 11 May, the German glider troops on the roof of Eben-Emael, had forced the garrison to surrender and two bridges over the Maas (Meuse) at Vroenhoven and Veldwezelt near Maastricht were captured. The disaster forced the Belgian Army to retreat towards the line from Antwerp to Louvain on 12 May, far too soon for the French First Army to arrive and dig in.

The French Corps de Cavalerie had reached the Gembloux Gap on 11 May and officers reported that the area had been far less fortified by the Belgians than expected. Anti-tank defences had not been built and there were no trenches or concrete fortifications; there were some Cointet-elements (steel barriers) but none of the anti-tank mines supposed to protect them. Some of the Cointet-elements were so poorly sited that a French officer wondered if the Germans had been asked where to put them. Prioux tried to persuade Billotte and Georges to scrap the Dyle plan and revert to the Escaut plan but with the 1st Army Group on the move, Georges decided against changing the plan; Blanchard was ordered to accelerate the advance of the First Army to arrive on 14 May, a day early.

The Corps de Cavalerie made contact with the Germans at 1:00 p.m. and fought a delaying action against the XVI Panzer Corps in the Battle of Hannut (12–14 May). Hannut was the first tank-against-tank encounter of the campaign and the French Somua S35s proved superior to the German tanks in firepower and armour protection. The Corps de Cavalerie then withdrew behind the First Army, which had arrived at the Dyle Line. The corps had 105 tank casualties against 165 German tanks knocked out but the French left their damaged tanks behind; the Germans were able to repair 100 panzers. Belgian troops were retiring to the area between Louvain and Antwerp, filling the gap between the BEF and the Seventh Army; there was a lull along the Belgian army positions from Wijnegem to Lier and Louvain and the front held by the BEF. South of the BEF, the French First Army tried to dig in from Wavre to Gembloux and Namur but closer to the Belgian–French frontier to the south, the Germans got across the Maas (Meuse) at Houx and from Douzy to Vrigne-sur-Meuse in France.

On 15 May, the BEF counter-attacked at Louvain and the Germans attacked the First Army along the Dyle, causing the meeting engagement that Gamelin had tried to avoid. The First Army repulsed the XVI Panzer Corps during the Battle of Gembloux (14–15 May), which had followed the Battle of Hannut but GQG realised that the main German attack had come further south, through the Ardennes. The First Army began a retirement towards Charleroi, because the French success in Belgium was contributing to the disaster on the Meuse at Sedan and on 16 May, Blanchard was ordered to retreat to the French border. The British also began to retreat to the Escaut and the First Army was pushed back closer to the Charleroi–Brussels Canal. Next day, parts of the BEF began to retreat towards the Dender river as the British reorganised to face the threat on their right flank against the Germans who had broken through south of the First Army. The First Army retreated to a line from Ath, southwards to Lens to link with the remainder of the Ninth Army at Mons; only exiguous forces remained between Maubeuge and Attigny. Allied forces in Belgium continued the retreat on 18 May to the Escaut and towards the French border further south. The Germans followed up the Allied retreat on Sunday 19 May but made a much greater effort in the south from the Meuse, along the Somme river valley, towards the Channel coast. Parts of the Seventh Army began to assemble from Péronne along the Somme and Ailette rivers, across the Oise to Coucy-le-Chateau.

=== Ardennes ===
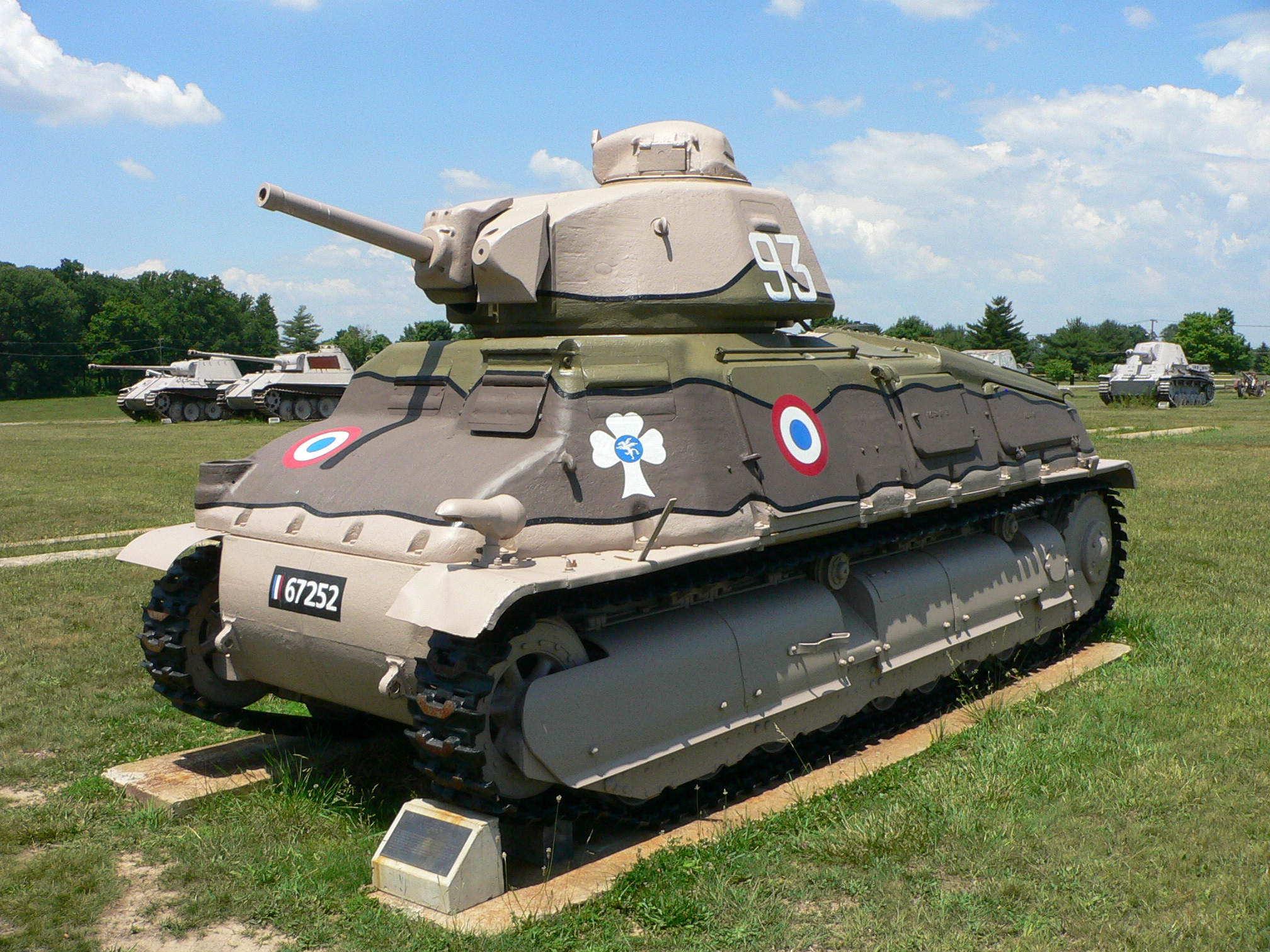
2005 photograph of a French SOMUA S35

German troops were flown to the Belgian Ardennes to capture road junctions and other German troops advanced into Luxembourg as five panzer divisions of Panzergruppe von Kleist advanced through the Ardennes. XIX Panzer Corps with three panzer divisions on the southern flank towards Sedan against the Second Army and the XLI Panzer Corps with two panzer divisions on the northern flank, towards Monthermé against the Ninth Army. (Note: Panzergruppe von Kleist had to move 134,000 men, 1,222 tanks and 378 vehicles through the Ardennes, creating the greatest traffic jam in Europe.) The XV Corps moved through the upper Ardennes with two panzer divisions towards Dinant as a flank guard against a counter-attack from the north. From 10 to 11 May, the XIX Panzer Corps engaged the two cavalry divisions of the Second Army, surprised them with a far larger force than expected and forced the French back. The Ninth Army to the north had also sent its two cavalry divisions forward, which were withdrawn on 12 May before they met German troops. Corap needed the cavalry divisions to reinforce the defences on the Meuse, because some of the infantry had not arrived. The most advanced German units reached the Meuse in the afternoon but the local French commanders thought that they were far ahead of the main body and would wait before trying to cross the Meuse.

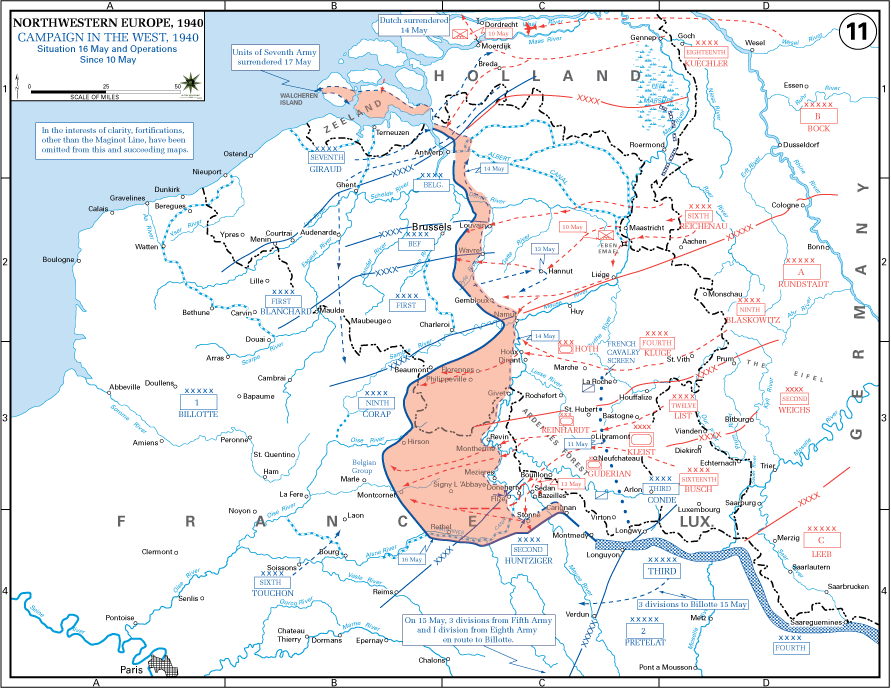
German advances, 10–16 May 1940

From 10 May, Allied bombers had been sent to raid northern Belgium to delay the German advance while the First Army moved up; attacks on the bridges at Maastricht had been costly failures, 135 RAF day bombers being reduced to 72 operational aircraft by 12 May. Georges changed air force priority from the First to the Second Army on 12 May but Billotte only diverted a third of the air effort. Georges also began to reinforce the Second Army by ordering the 3e Division Cuirassée (DCr, reserve armoured division) and five other divisions from the general reserve but with no urgency. The reinforcements moved as transport arrived from 11 to 13 May and were positioned to stop a German wheel to the south-east, against the rear of the Maginot Line. Despite the precautions taken against a German attack through the Ardennes, Georges and Gamelin remained more concerned about events in Belgium and on 13 May, when the Germans were across the Meuse at three points, GQG reported that it was too soon to predict the main German attack. At 7:00 a.m. on 13 May, the Luftwaffe began bombing the French defences around Sedan and continued for eight hours with about 1,000 aircraft, the biggest air attack in history.

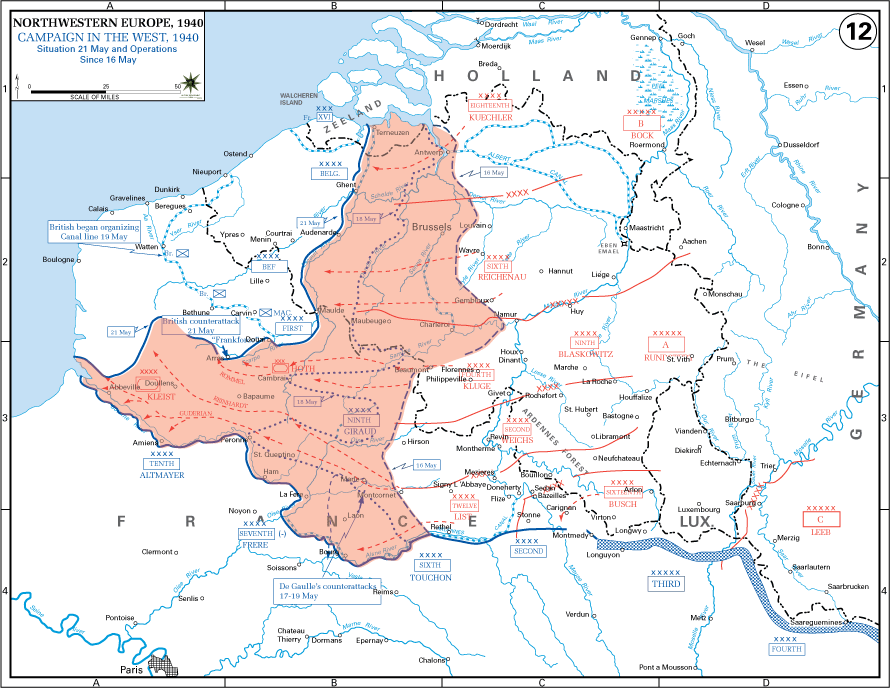
The German advance up to 21 May 1940

Little material damage was done to the Second Army but morale collapsed. In the French 55e Division at Sedan, some troops began to straggle to the rear; in the evening panic spread through the division. German troops attacked across the river at 3:00 p.m. and had gained three footholds on the west bank by nightfall. The French and the RAF managed to fly 152 bomber and 250 fighter sorties on the Sedan bridges on 14 May but only in formations of 10–20 aircraft. The attackers suffered a loss of 11 per cent, the RAF losing 30 of 71 aircraft and the French being reduced to sending obsolete bombers to attack in the afternoon, also with many losses. The 1e DCr, which had been intended to form part of the First Army reserve, was sent to Charleroi at the north side of the German salient on 10 May. Billotte was still unsure of the main German effort and hesitated to direct it to the Ninth Army until 14 May; the order took until the afternoon to arrive and the march was obstructed by refugees on the roads. When the 4e division d'infanterie nord-africaine (DINA, North African Infantry Division) counter-attacked that day, 1e DCr was still struggling forward and was caught refuelling by the 7th Panzer Division.

The 1e DCr knocked out about 100 panzers but was defeated in detail and ceased to exist as a division. The Ninth Army had been bypassed on both flanks and was ordered to retreat from the Meuse to a line from Charleroi to Rethel. The French held on to the Meuse about 5 mi (8.0 km) south of Namur but the German crossings of the Meuse further south from Dinant to Stenay continued with a swift advance past Mézières. On the south side of the German salient, on the right flank of the Second Army, it took until 15 May for the 3e DCr to attack at Stonne and again the attacks were piecemeal, lasting for several days but having only local effect. On 16 May, the Germans reached Hirson and pushed beyond Montcornet towards Laon, with little opposition to the advances westwards. The 1st Army Group was ordered to retreat from the Dyle Line, to avoid being trapped by the German breakthrough against the Second and Ninth armies. A defensive line was to be created from Maubeuge along the Sambre and Oise but German troops got across the Sambre at Landrecies and the Oise at several points on 18 May and by evening had reached St Quentin and advanced towards Cambrai, which fell on 19 May, followed by Amiens on 20 May. The Germans reached Abbeville on the Channel coast and closed on Montreuil and Boulogne, cutting off the northern armies.

== Aftermath ==
=== Analysis ===
By choosing the Dyle plan and imposing the Breda variant, Gamelin completed the evolution of army planning for the defence of France that began in 1920. Staff studies of the Breda variant caused some senior French generals to question the plan; Georges requested that the Seventh Army be replaced by two divisions and returned to the General Reserve and warned against sending the bulk of the French mobile forces against an attack on the northern flank that was a diversion for a German attack through the centre. Doughty wrote that Gamelin gained confidence in the capacity of the Allied armies, adopting a grand strategy of dubious value over the objections of some of the most senior French generals. For control of the Scheldt Estuary and the possibility of adding ten Dutch divisions to the Allied order of battle, Gamelin committed the best divisions of the General Reserve, leaving little to confront a German surprise. Gamelin imposed the Breda variant unilaterally, without consultation with the governments of Belgium and the Netherlands, which refused to make detailed arrangements for joint military action, unless invaded.

Gamelin was an officer who had risen through the French military hierarchy with a reputation for caution, yet he took a great gamble with the Dyle plan, which was not inherently reckless until the Breda variant. Doughty wrote that had the Germans been aware of the French plan, it would have greatly relieved them of apprehensions about their huge gamble in the Ardennes. Some of the best French divisions were wasted on the Breda variant, leaving few reserves from the Rhine to the Channel, the best divisions on the flanks, leaving France vulnerable to an attack through the centre. Georges was responsible for the placement of the divisions behind the 1st Army Group but Gamelin devised the Breda variant and forced it on some reluctant subordinates. The Dyle plan was laid down in thick document volumes for each headquarters, Prioux complaining of "enormous dossiers...full of corrections, additions, annexes, appendices, etc". Motorised units in the Seventh and First armies had orders for vehicle speeds, distances to be maintained and the formalities to be observed with the Belgian authorities. Had the divisions followed their instructions, the rapid deployment to the Dyle Line would have been reduced to 10 mi (16 km) per day.

=== Hannut ===
At the Battle of Hannut, the 2nd and 3rd DLM of the Corps de Cavalerie with 239 Hotchkiss light tanks and 176 Somua S35s had faced the 3rd Panzer Division with 280 tanks and the 4th Panzer Division with 343 tanks. The German units had only 73 Panzer III and 52 Panzer IV, while the French also had 90 Panhard 178 armoured cars, carrying 25 mm SA 35 anti-tank guns, capable of penetrating any German panzer. The 37 mm gun carried by the Panzer III was ineffective against the French tanks and the 75 mm KwK 37 of the Panzer IV could only penetrate a Somua at close-range. By fighting on the defensive, the French tanks also had the advantage of hiding in villages and engaging from cover. A lack of operational radios was a tactical disadvantage and a report from Panzer Regiment 35 called the French "leaderless, aimless, poorly-led and tactically inferior". The French still managed to inflict a considerable number of tank casualties on the Germans at Hannut (and later at Gembloux), the 4th Panzer Division being reduced to 137 operational tanks on 16 May with only four Panzer IV, a reduction of 45–50 per cent. The 3rd Panzer Division lost 20–25 per cent and despite the lightly damaged tanks being quickly repaired, the fighting power of the XVI Panzer Corps was substantially reduced.

The Battle of Hannut was a French tactical success, the stand of the Corps de Cavalerie providing time for the rest of the First Army to dig on the Dyle Line by the fifth day of operations (14 May); the German attack on the Dyle Line could not be organised in any strength until the sixth day (15 May). At the operational level of war, that the Battle of Hannut had been fought at all was a big success for the German decoy operation in central Belgium, which made the French victory irrelevant in the context of the campaign. The Corps de Cavalerie, with its organisation and equipment, would have been invaluable for a counter-attack against the German divisions over the Meuse at Sedan. When local French counter-attacks at Sedan failed on 14 May, Gamelin contemplated ordering the Corps de Cavalerie to counter-attack southwards but the XVI Panzer Corps and the Luftwaffe had inflicted such losses that the corps was incapable of such a manoeuvre. With no forces available against the penetration at Sedan, the XVI Panzer Corps was no longer needed for the feint in Belgium and was transferred to Heeresgruppe A (Army Group A) on 18 May.

German territorial losses after the Treaty of Versailles

Map showing the Escaut and Dyle lines

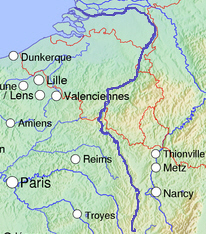
Map showing the course of the Meuse

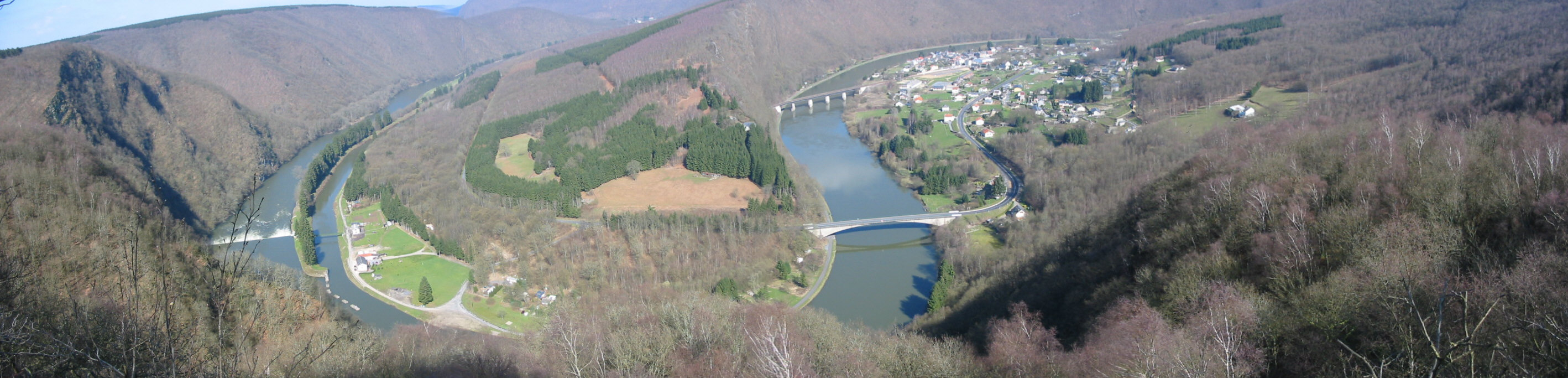
View of the Meuse in the French Ardennes

Relief map showing the Escaut/Scheldt river

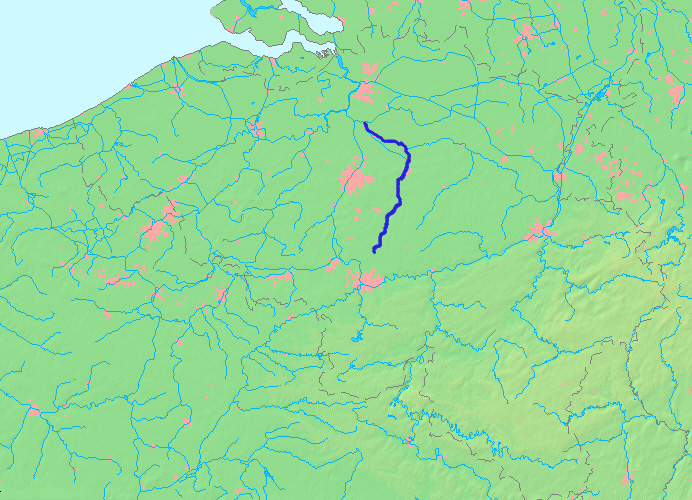
Diagram of the course of the Dyle (Dijle) river

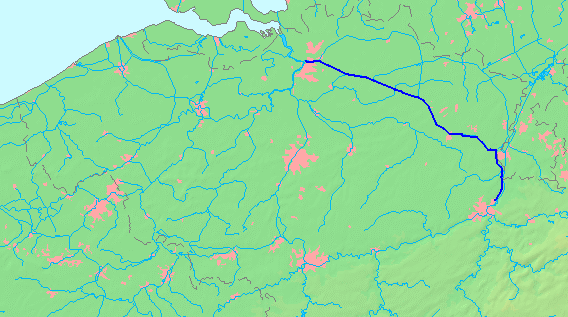
Diagram of the course of the Albert Canal

Map of the Netherlands, showing Breda in North Brabant
