= Devèze Line =

Belgian interwar fortified line

- Ligne Devèze
- Part of Belgian eastern frontier defences
- Wallonia, eastern Belgium; Near Arlon, Bastogne, Vielsalm, Henri-Chapelle in Belgium
- Belgian fortifications before the Second World War, including the Devèze Line

Site information
- Type: Forward defensive line
- Owner: Formerly Belgian state; many works later sold or abandoned
- Controlled by: Belgian Army
- Condition: Mostly abandoned; numerous remains survive

Site history
- Built: 1933–1935
- Built by: Belgian Army
- In use: 1933–1940
- Materials: Reinforced concrete
- Battles/wars: Battle of Belgium, Battle of France

Garrison information
- Garrison: Chasseurs Ardennais; Border Cyclists
- Occupants: Usually three or four men per shelter

The Devèze Line (French: Ligne Devèze), also known as the Devèze Wall (French: Mur Devèze), was a dispersed Belgian system of small reinforced concrete blockhouses built between 1933 and 1935 near the country's eastern frontier. The line was named unofficially after Albert Devèze, Belgium's minister of national defense, who promoted the construction programme.

Unlike the large forts of the Fortified Position of Liège and the Fortified Position of Namur, the Devèze Line consisted of small, standardised, single-room blockhouses intended for local delaying actions by mobile units. The works were grouped into local centres of resistance, mainly in what are now the provinces of Liège and Luxembourg. The blockhouses, commonly known as abris Devèze (lit. 'Devèze shelters'), were intended to delay a possible German invasion and to support Belgian forward defense in the Ardennes, Belgian Lorraine, and the region between the Vesdre and the Meuse.

The defensive line emerged from a contested Belgian defense policy of the early 1930s. Devèze favoured resistance close to the frontier while awaiting possible French support, but many officers preferred defense in depth behind the Meuse and the principal fortified positions. After Belgium moved toward renewed neutrality in 1936, the forward-defense concept lost official support. By the time of the German invasion on 10 May 1940, most Devèze blockhouses were not manned, although several were involved in local delaying actions, notably at Martelange and Chabrehez.

== Background ==
The decision to construct the Devèze Line formed part of a wider interwar dispute among Belgian politicians and army officers over whether Belgium should defend its eastern frontier or withdraw to stronger positions farther west, between the Meuse and the coast. Belgian defense planning in the interwar period was shaped by the memory of the German invasion of 1914 and the country's exposed eastern frontier.

As minister of national defense, Albert Devèze supported a policy often described as the "integral defence of the territory" (défense intégrale du territoire). In this concept, Belgian frontier regions were not to be abandoned immediately and key routes in southern Belgium would be protected. In the event of an invasion, forward troops would be deployed in the frontier zone and use obstacles, demolitions, and prepared blockhouses to delay the enemy and give the main Belgian and Allied forces time to react. Under the Franco-Belgian military arrangements of the 1920s, Belgian planners expected that French forces might assist Belgium in the event of a German attack.

Devèze's programme was approved by the Council of Ministers on 11 October 1933. It called for strong resistance north of the Vesdre, the construction of four forts on the Herve plateau, an advanced line to stop motorised enemy elements, and, south of the Vesdre, sufficient defense to allow Allied reinforcements to arrive through demolition lines, obstruction lines, light blockhouses and the creation of the Chasseurs Ardennais and the Border Cyclist units.

== Construction ==
Blockhouses of the Devèze Line (Belgium): ■ existing blockhouse or remains · ■ restored/interpreted blockhouse · ✖ destroyed blockhouse · ● unconfirmed location

The blockhouses were built between 1933 and 1935. The line was never intended to form a continuous barrier. Instead, it consisted of a network of small centres of resistance adapted to local topography. The works were normally sited to command roads, bridges, valleys, railway lines, village approaches, high ground and other likely routes of penetration, but they were not always arranged to provide mutual supporting fire from their embrasures.

The works north of the Amblève formed a forward screen for the Fortified Position of Liège and were held by units of the Border Cyclists, which were equipped with T-13 tank destroyers. Those south of the Amblève were defended by the Chasseurs Ardennais, a light infantry formation created specifically for operations in the Ardennes and based in detachments at Arlon, Bastogne, and Vielsalm.

Estimates of the total number of works vary by source. Some authors give about 375, while a more detailed account gives 388, of which 322 were south of the Amblève and 66 were north of it, supported by the Fortified Position of Liège. In the Liège sector, the blockhouses were organised into nine centres comprising 66 shelters: Beusdael (3), Hombourg (14), Henri-Chapelle (12), Grünhault (3), Dolhain (12), Jalhay (6), Hockai (2), Malmedy (6), and Stavelot (8).

The blockhouse system was supplemented by a series of anti-tank strongpoints in Érezée, La Roche, Baraque de Fraiture, Saint-Hubert, Neufchâteau, Recogne and Barrière de Champion. A first line of 172 blockhouses was established along the frontier, stretching from Stavelot to Arlon, via Houffalize and Bastogne, and supported by the Salm, Upper Eastern Ourthe, and Sûre rivers. The fortified centres of Arlon and Bastogne comprised 28 and 29 blockhouses, respectively. A total of 44 blockhouses defended key road junctions. Additional works at Habay-la-Neuve (6 blockhouses), Vance (3), Neufchâteau (13), and a line from Amberloup to Recogne (14) completed the defense system, which cost 6 million Belgian francs.

== Design ==
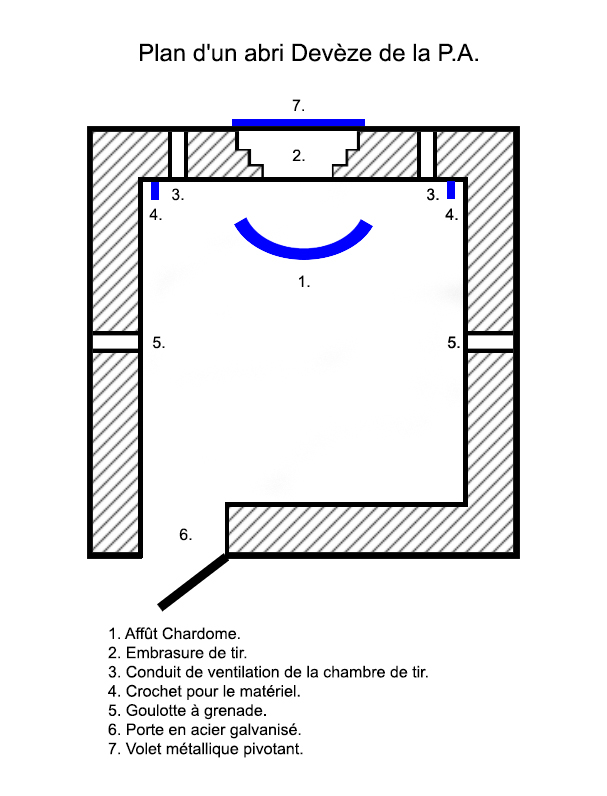
Plan of a Devèze blockhouse of model A.

A typical Devèze blockhouse was a small cubical casemate of reinforced concrete, without an observation hatch, known as an abri de flanquement (lit. 'flanking shelter'). Most consisted of a single firing chamber designed for a crew of three or four men, typically a corporal or a sergeant and two soldiers. The usual dimensions were approximately 3.25 m (10.7 ft) by 3.30 m (10.8 ft), with concrete walls about 40 to 60 cm (16 to 24 in) thick.

The firing chamber normally had a single embrasure, closed by a metal shutter, through which a machine gun or light machine gun could be fired. The floor included fittings for a "Chardome" mounting, which allowed weapons such as the Maxim 08/15 and the Belgian FM Mle 30 to be used efficiently and removed quickly. Ventilation ducts protected by metal grilles were installed in the firing face. The roof was made of corrugated steel sheets supported by a transverse beam and covered by a concrete slab. Access was provided by a metal door placed either opposite the firing embrasure or in a lateral face, depending on the local layout. Some blockhouses also had grenade chutes for Mills bombs in the side walls. Their small size, limited armament and lack of independent facilities reflected their intended tactical role: they were delaying positions rather than self-sufficient forts capable of prolonged resistance.

The Devèze Line was supplemented by numerous anti-tank shelters, known as abris de contre-irruption (lit. 'counter-incursion shelters'), built beside bridges, major road junctions and village centres. They typically measured 8.50 m (27.9 ft) by 6.65 m (21.8 ft), with walls 1.30 m (4.3 ft) thick. They were equipped with two embrasures and an observation cupola. The armament was more substantial, including a 47 mm anti-tank gun, a heavy machine gun, a machine gun, defensive grenades, a fan, and an acetylene searchlight. Some were connected by telephone, while others had coloured flares intended to request covering fire from the artillery of the fortified positions. The garrison consisted of a sous-officier, two corporals, and eight soldiers. They also provided direct support to the Fortified Position of Liège.

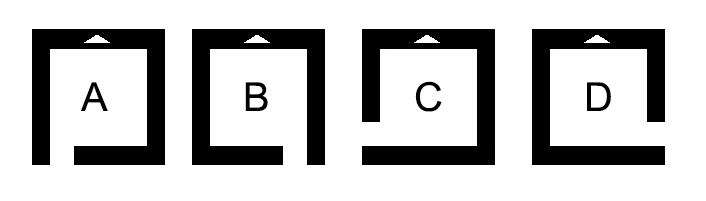
Different models of Devèze blockhouse for the forward position.

== Strategic reassessment and use in 1940 ==
The Devèze Line was closely tied to Belgian defense doctrine of the early 1930s, but that doctrine changed radically in October 1936 when King Leopold III announced that Belgium would remain neutral in the event of another war in Europe as part of what he termed an Independence Policy (Politique d'Indépendance). To this end, the Belgian government sought to move away from alliances by leaving the Locarno system, renouncing the defense pact with France signed in 1920, and receiving a guarantee of neutrality from Nazi Germany in 1937.

The effective end of the Franco-Belgian military agreement and the remilitarisation of the Rhineland shifted planning away from Devèze's frontier-defense concept. By early 1937, Belgian defensive planning placed greater emphasis on defense in depth, including the Albert Canal, the Meuse, and the fortified positions of Liège and Namur, while the Chasseurs Ardennais were assigned a covering role between the fortified positions of Liège and Namur. As a result, the Devèze blockhouses became increasingly marginal to the main Belgian defense plan. Many were neglected or left unmanned.

When Germany invaded Belgium on 10 May 1940 during the Battle of Belgium, most of the blockhouses were not manned as a consequence of the broader strategic shift away from Devèze's earlier frontier-defense concept. Nevertheless, some blockhouses were involved in the first hours of the German offensive. Fighting took place at Martelange and Chabrehez. At Chabrehez, the Chasseurs Ardennais resisted elements of the German 7th Panzer Division, then commanded by Erwin Rommel. The action delayed the German advance locally, although it did not alter the outcome of the German advance through the Ardennes toward the Meuse.

== Surviving remains and commemoration ==
After the Second World War, many Devèze blockhouses were abandoned, sold by the Belgian state, buried, adapted for agricultural use, or simply left to deteriorate. Their reinforced-concrete construction meant that many survived, often in woodland, fields, at road junctions or near former village approaches.

The surviving blockhouses form visible elements of military heritage in Wallonia. Several blockhouses have been restored or interpreted by local authorities, tourism bodies, veterans' associations, or volunteers. Examples include Fortin Boggess near Assenois, associated with the relief of the besieged Bastogne in December 1944; a restored blockhouse at Trois-Ponts; a Circuit des fortins at Houffalize; the blockhouses in the Parc du Châtelet at Habay and the memorial near the Chabrehez blockhouses commemorating the Chasseurs Ardennais killed on 10 May 1940.

== Gallery ==
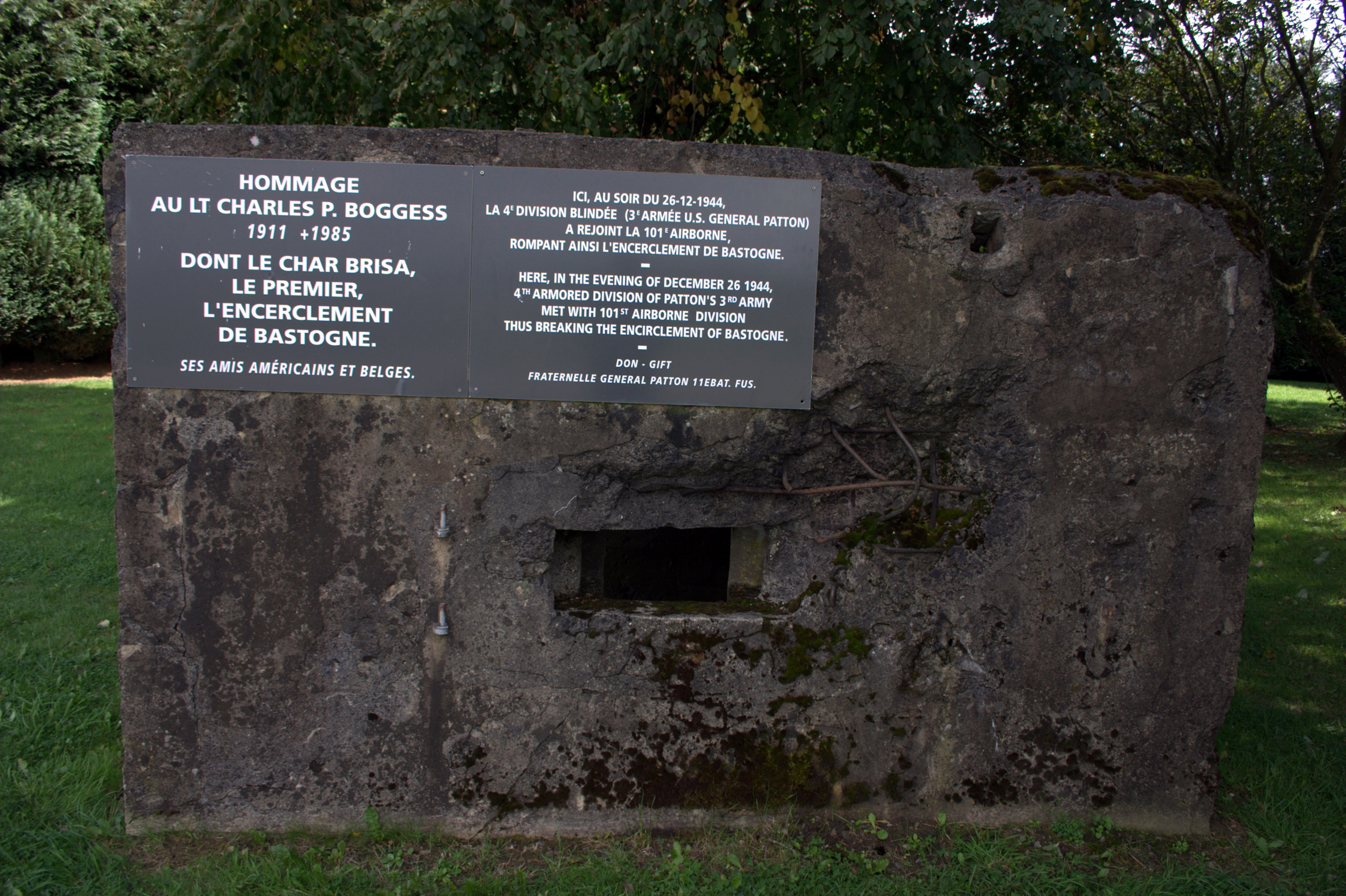
Bunker near Assenois where Cobra King linked up with the 101st Airborne during the Battle of the Bulge.

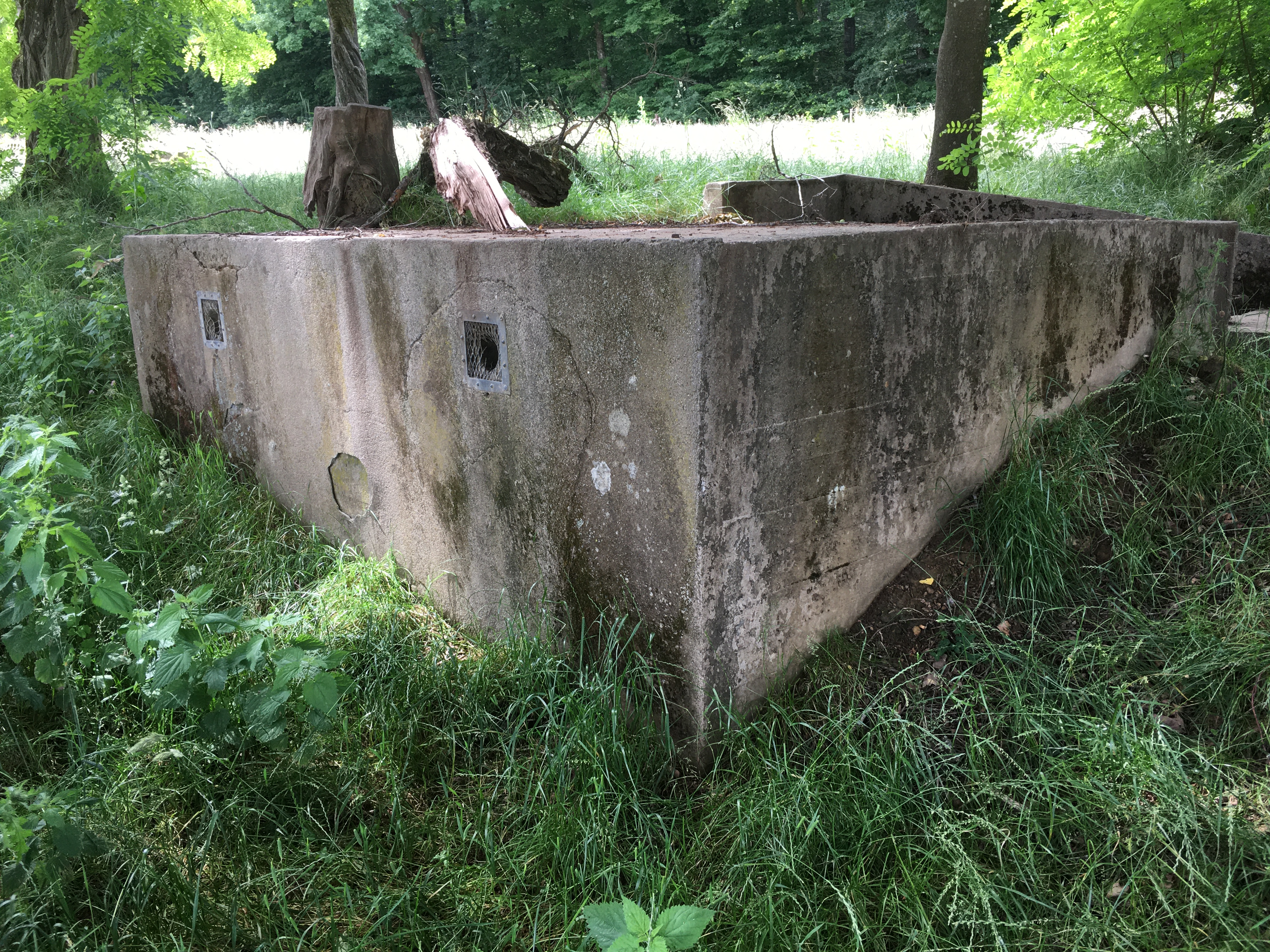
A surviving Devèze shelter in woodland.

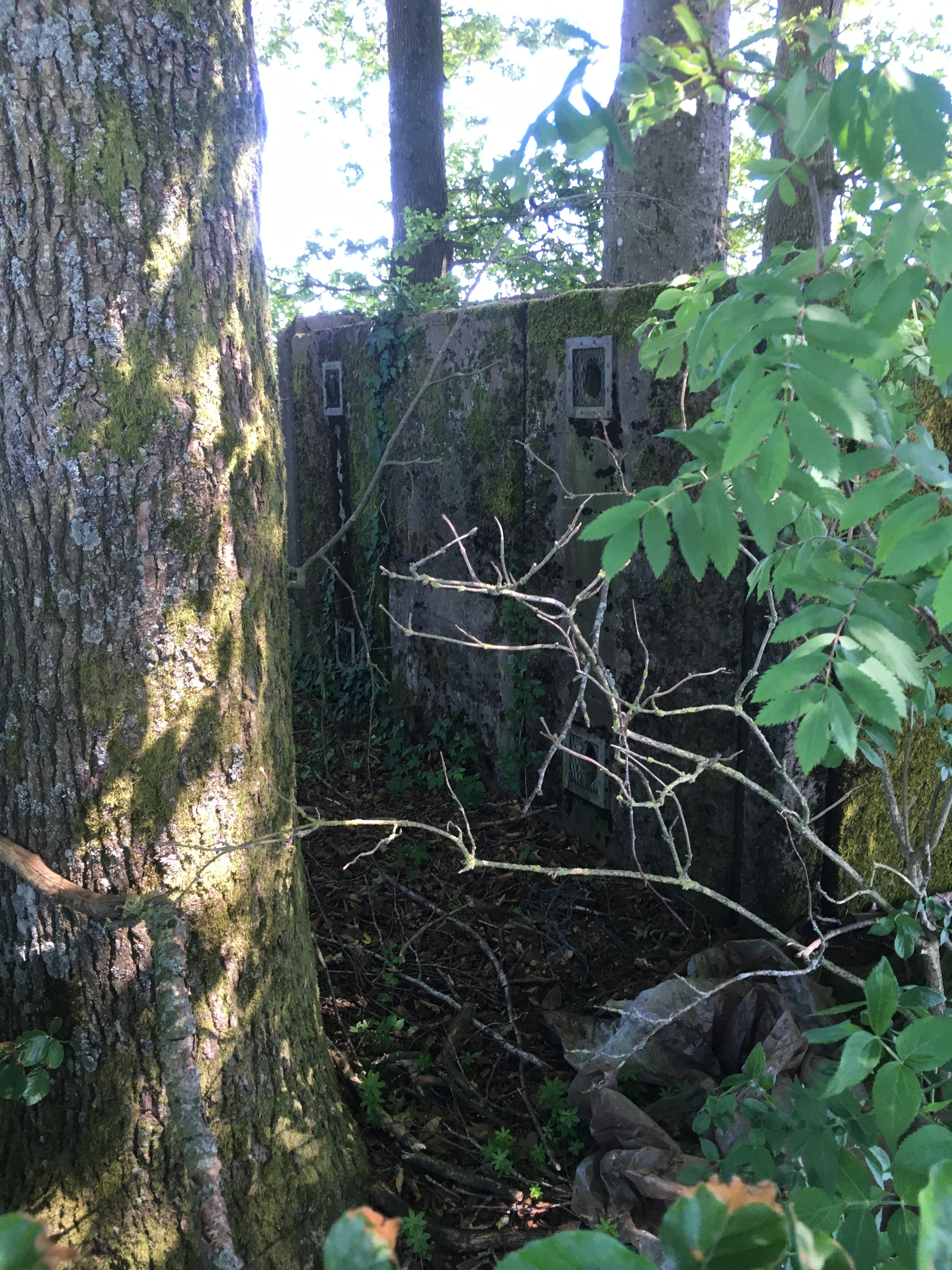
Shelter in woodland near Arlon.

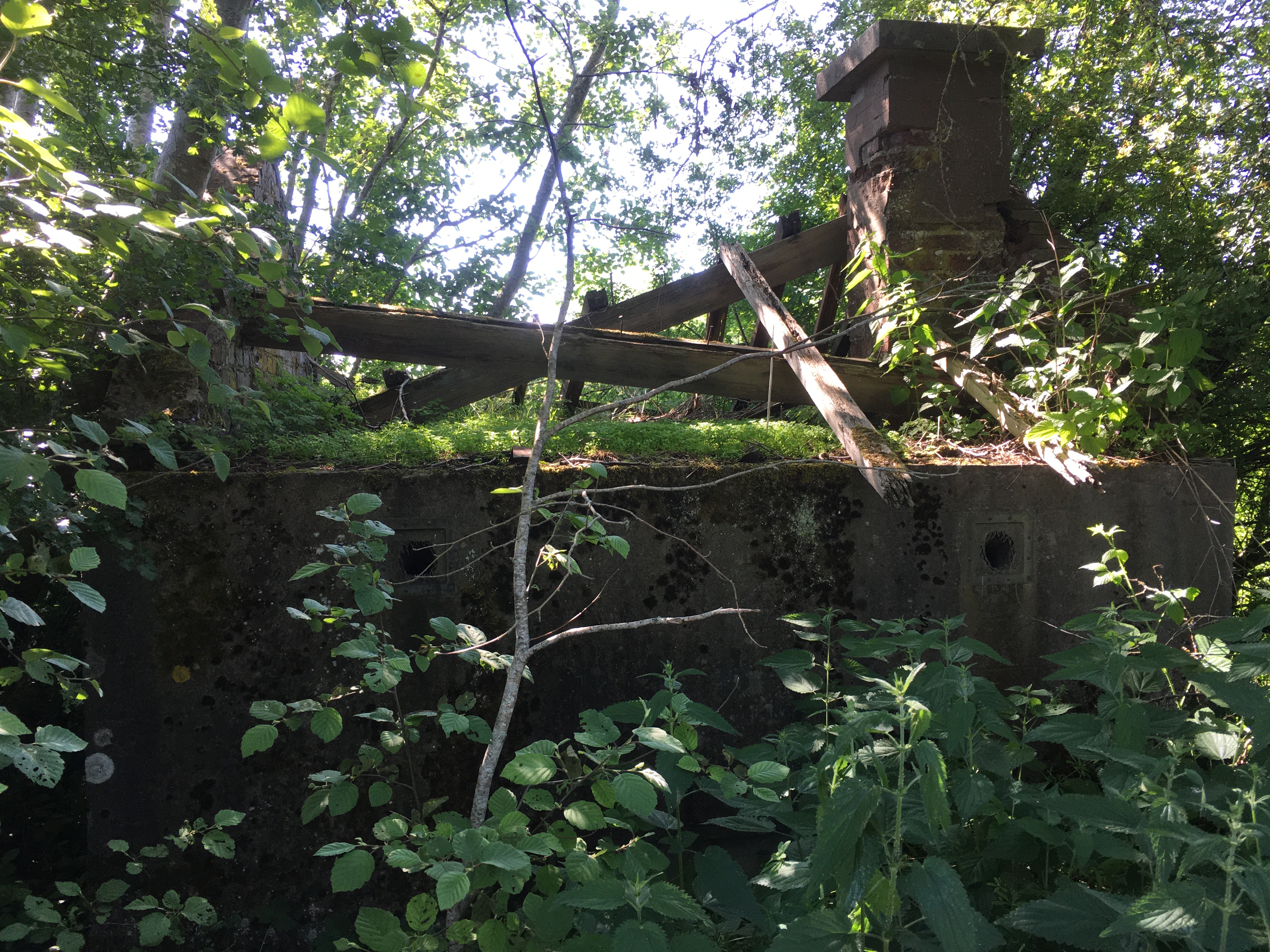
Shelter near Arlon with a deteriorated roof.

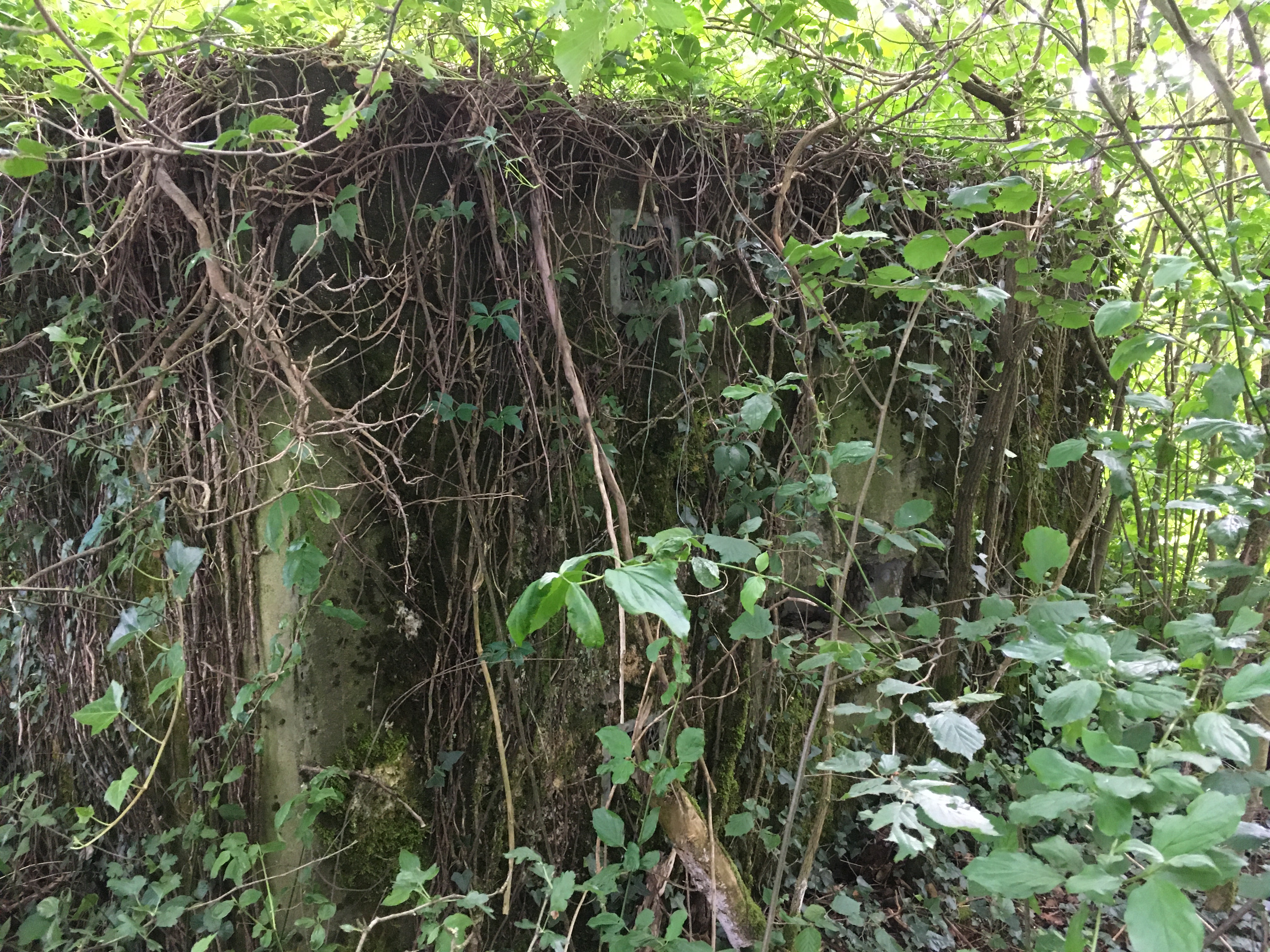
Shelter covered by vegetation.

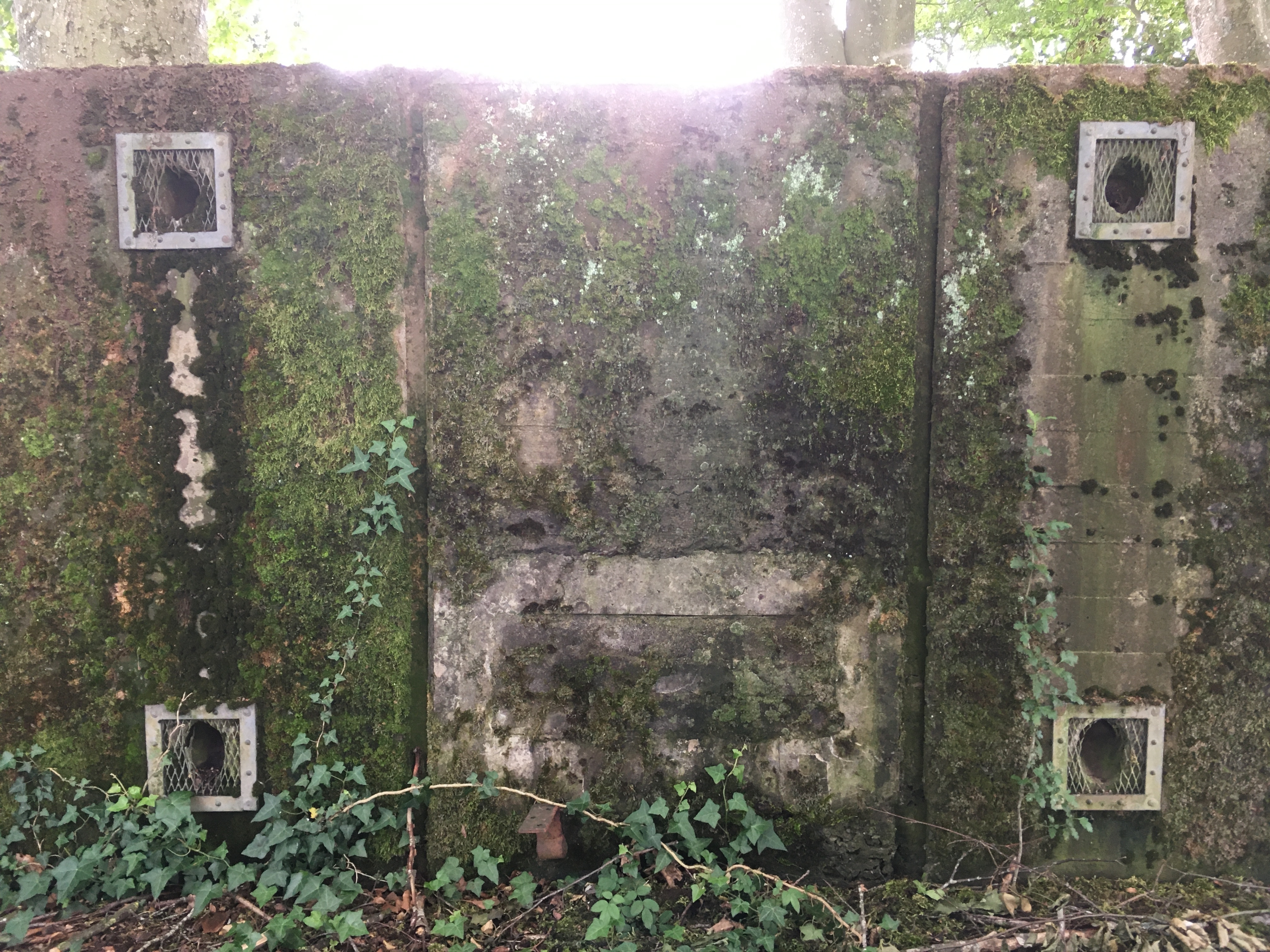
Front face of a shelter with its embrasure sealed off.

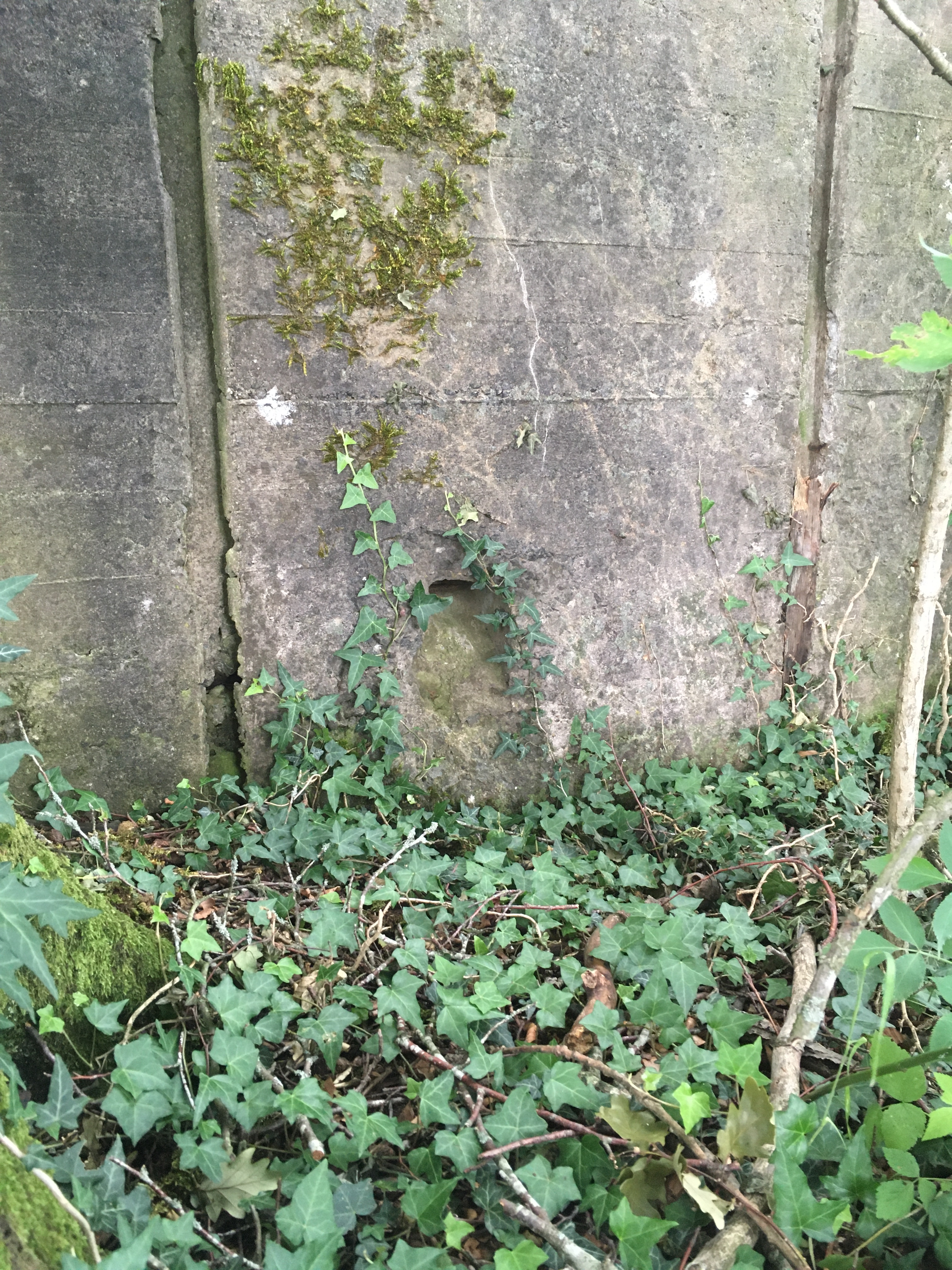
Lateral face with a grenade chute.

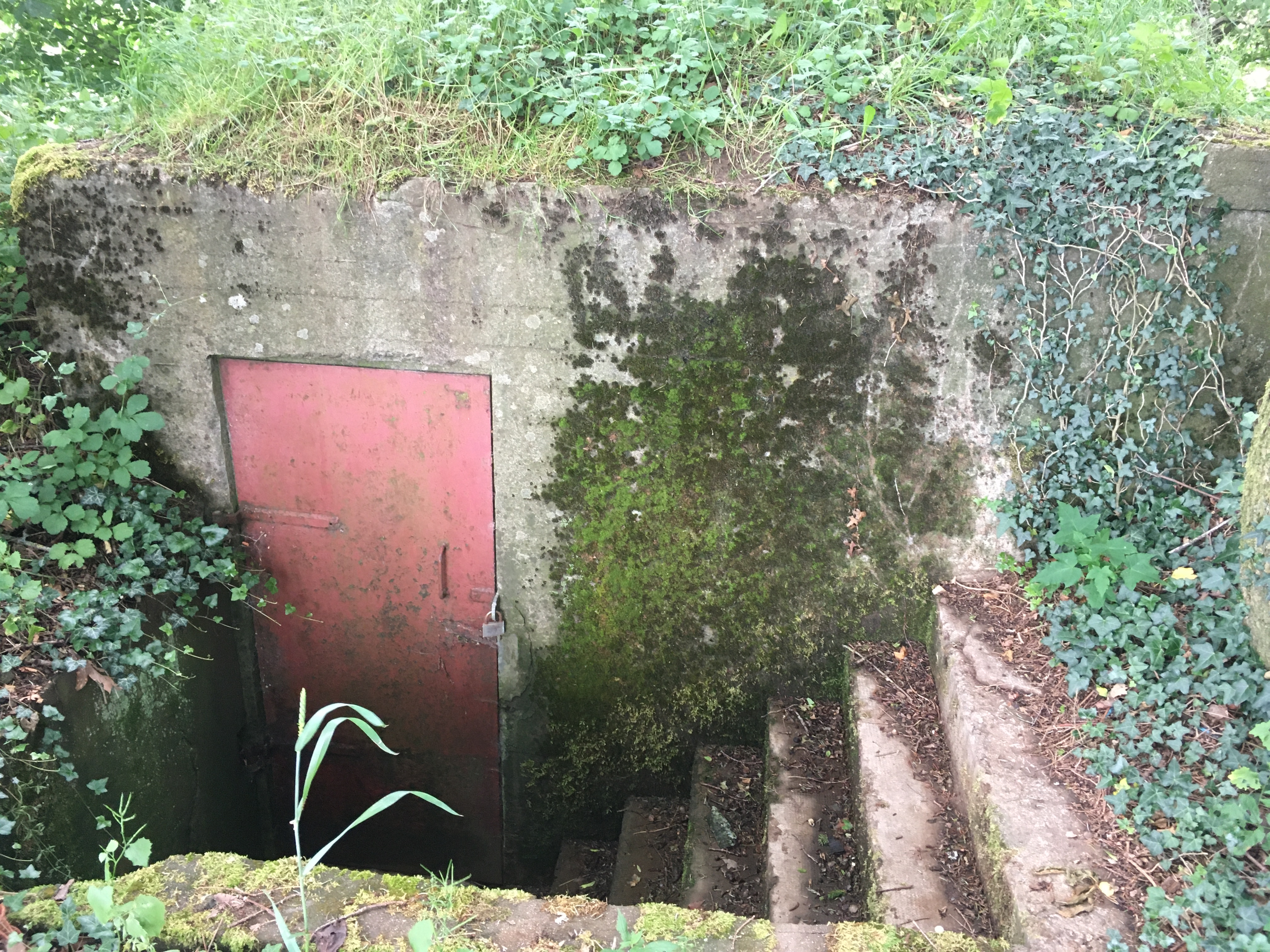
Metal access door to the firing chamber.

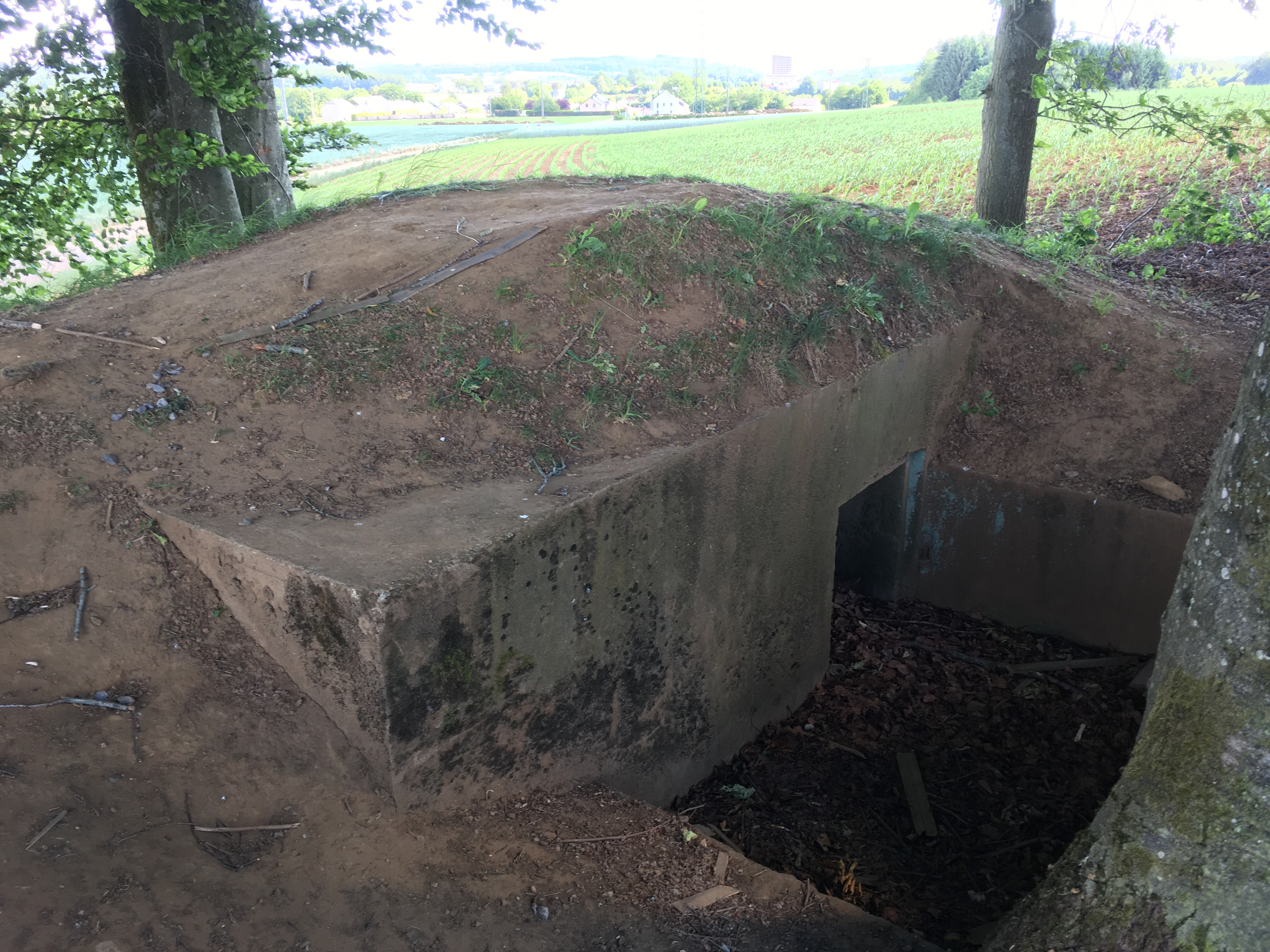
Partly earth-covered shelter near Arlon.

== See also ==
- German invasion of Belgium (1940)
- KW Line
- Maginot Line
- Schuster Line

== Bibliography ==
- Alexandre, André (July–September 1988). "Les Cyclistes-frontière, 10 mai 1940. Premiers à faire face". Bulletin du Centre Liégeois d'Histoire et d'Archéologie Militaires (in French). 3 (11).
- Alexandre, André (April–June 1988). "Les Chasseurs Ardennais". Bulletin du Centre Liégeois d'Histoire et d'Archéologie Militaires (in French). 3 (10).
- Belgium Ministry of Foreign Affairs (1941). "Appendix 4: German Declaration of October 13th, 1937". Belgium: The Official Account of What Happened, 1939–40. London: Evans Brothers.
- Beuken, R. (2022). "Le Lieutenant Cyrille Jacquemin et les Cyclistes-Frontière, de leur création à l'après-guerre". Les Nouvelles Notices Visétoises (in French) (163): 41–60.
- Bikar, André (December 1975). "Les ouvrages de fortification belges en 1940: Les abris des Ardennes". Revue belge d'histoire militaire (in French). XXI (4). Brussels: Musée royal de l'armée: 361–415. ISSN 0035-0877.
- CegeSoma (2020). "Devèze Albert". Belgium WWII (in French). CegeSoma/Archives de l'État.
- Caton, Paul Emile (1969). 1939–1940: une guerre perdue en quatre jours (in French). Blainville-sur-Mer: L'amitié par le livre.
- Chantraine, S. (2020). "Les Cyclistes-Frontière de Visé les 10 et 11 mai 1940". VIGILO (in French).
- Champagne, Jacques-Pierre; Muller, Bernard (2019). Les fortins Devèze d'Arlon: le centre de résistance frontière, 1933–1940 (in French). Arlon: Demdel. ISBN 978-2-87549-303-3.
- Colignon, Alain (2020). "Position fortifiée de Liège". Belgium WWII (in French). CegeSoma/Archives de l'État.
- Epstein, Jonathan A. (2014). Belgium's Dilemma: The Formation of Belgian Defense Policy, 1932–1940. Leiden: Brill. ISBN 978-90-04-26973-6.
- Hautecler, Georges (1955). "Le combat des Chasseurs Ardennais: Bodange le 10 mai 1940". Fraternelle royale des Chasseurs Ardennais (in French).
- Hautecler, Georges (1957). Le Combat de Chabrehez, 10 mai 1940: Chasseurs Ardennais contre Rommel. L'armée belge dans les deux guerres mondiales (in French). Vol. 2. Brussels: Ministère de la Défense nationale.
- Hurard, Yves (27 May 2011). "L'ancien abri de contre-irruption". L'Avenir (in French).
- Kaufmann, Joseph E.; Kaufmann, Hanna W. (1997). Maginot Imitations: Major Fortifications of Germany and Neighboring Countries. Westport, Connecticut: Praeger. ISBN 978-0-275-95720-9.
- Laurent, Pierre Henri (1969). "The Reversal of Belgian Foreign Policy, 1936–1937". The Review of Politics. 31 (3): 370–384. doi:10.1017/S003467050001038X.
- Mary, Jean-Yves (2010). Le corridor des Panzers. Vol. 1: Über die Maas, par-delà la Meuse, 10–15 mai 1940 (in French). Bayeux: Heimdal. ISBN 978-2-84048-270-3.
- P, L. (2020). "Un bunker oublié, caché". L'Avenir (in French).
- Polet, Julien (2020). "Les abris Devèze". Luxembourg belge (in French).
- Ry-Ponet (2026). "Poste Permanent N°9B des Piedroux". Ry-Ponet, un paysage à préserver (in French).
- Vanwelkenhuyzen, Jean (2007). Le gâchis des années 30: 1933–1937 (in French). Brussels: Racine/Lannoo. ISBN 978-2-87386-408-8.
- Vaesen, J. (2011). Amersfoort, Herman; Klinkert, Wim (eds.). "Between Passéisme and Modernisation? The Case of the Belgian Fortification System, 1926–1940". Small Powers in the Age of Total War, 1900–1940. Brill: 221–250. doi:10.1163/ej.9789004203211.i-372.70. ISBN 978-90-04-20433-1.
- Vernier, Franck (July 1992). "Les abris de la position fortifiée de Liège en mai 1940 (Abris PFL 3/4)". Bulletin du Centre Liégeois d'Histoire et d'Archéologie Militaires (in French). 5 (2).
- Wanty, Émile (1961). "Le problème de la défense des Ardennes en 1940". Revue d'Histoire de la Deuxième Guerre mondiale (in French) (42). Presses Universitaires de France.
- Westhof, Thibaut (2026a). "Le fortin N° 3 (Ermitage)". Houff'Archive (in French).
- Westhof, Thibaut (2026b). "Les fortins d'Albert Devèze". Houff'Archive (in French).
- Wegnez, Anne-Marie (1972). "La défense de la Belgique à la frontière: l'avis d'une population directement menacée". Belgisch Tijdschrift voor Nieuwste Geschiedenis (in French). 3 (3–4): 241–269.
