= Chasseurs Ardennais =

Infantry formation of the Belgian Army

Battalion of Chasseurs Ardennais
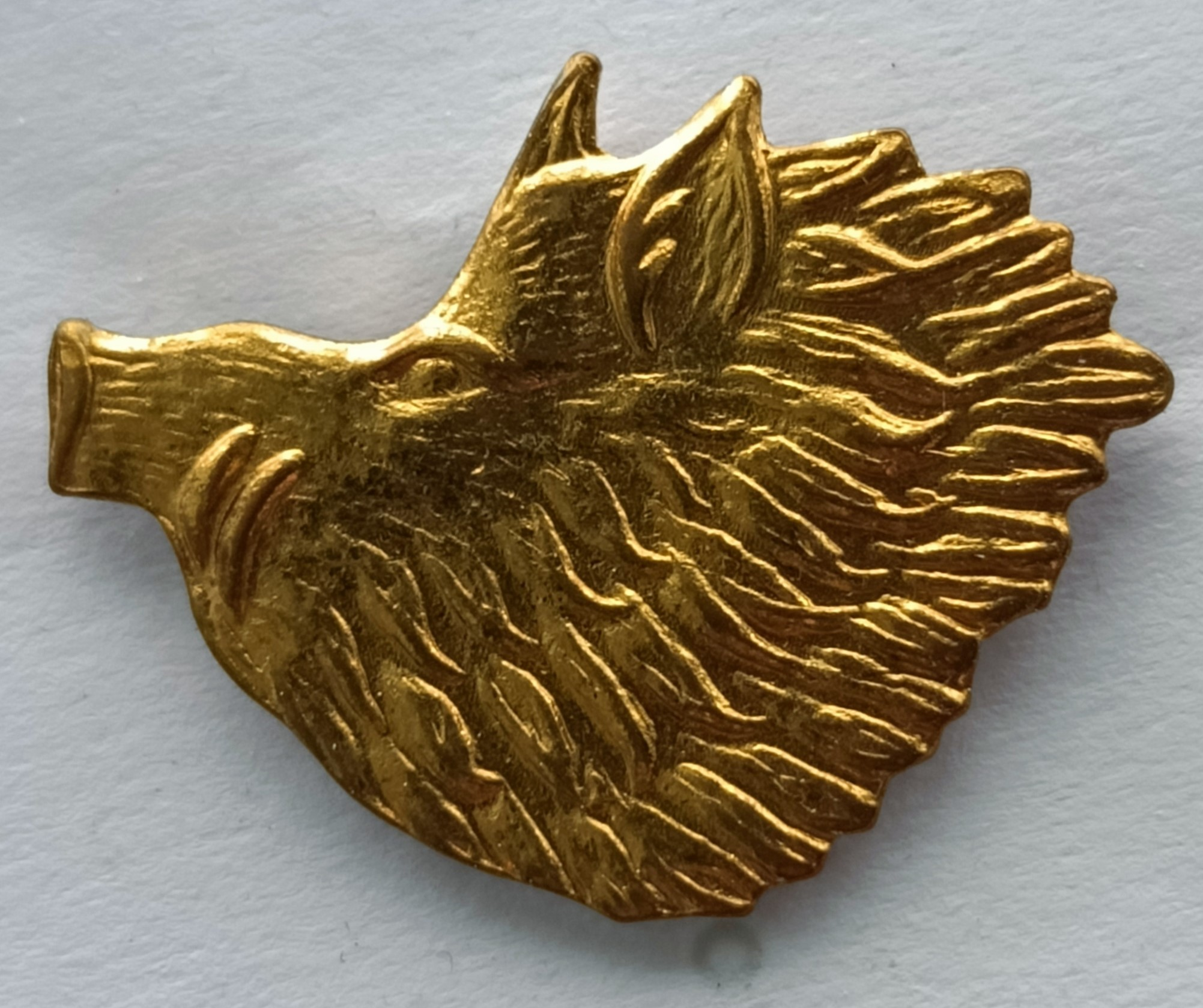
- Cap badge depicting the head of a wild boar
- Active: 1830 – 1933 (as 10th Line Regiment); 1933 – present
- Country: Belgium
- Branch: Belgian Army
- Type: Infantry
- Part of: Motorized Brigade
- Garrison/HQ: Marche-en-Famenne
- Mottos: Résiste et Mords! (lit. 'Resist and bite!')
- Colors
- March: Marche des Chasseurs ardennais
- Engagements: World War II; Congo Crisis; Afghanistan War

The Bataillon de Chasseurs Ardennais (lit. 'Battalion of Ardennes Hunters', or more figuratively, 'Ardennes Light Infantry', (Note: The French term chasseur (lit. 'hunter') has been widely used to denote light or mounted infantry formations.) officially abbreviated as ChA) is an infantry formation in the Belgian Army of the Belgian Armed Forces. Originally formed in 1933 to ensure the defense of Belgium's Luxembourg Province including the natural region of the Ardennes and particularly noted for its role during the German invasion of 1940, the unit currently serves as a mechanized infantry formation and forms part of the Motorized Brigade.

The Chasseurs ardennais were first formed as a light infantry unit in 1933 from the existing 10th Line Regiment to defend the largely rural region south of the fortified positions of Namur and Liège. Considered a high-value élite unit, it was formed largely of volunteers from the region and was allocated more modern equipment than other units of the Belgian Army. After Belgium's return to neutrality in 1936, the role of the Chasseurs ardennais shifted and the formation expanded significantly. It eventually consisted of two army divisions complete with artillery and mobile units.

At the time of the German invasion of Belgium in May 1940, the Chasseurs ardennais proved more successful in combat than many other units and fought a number of successful small-scale actions against the German Army before the capitulation of the Belgian Army. After the war, the military traditions of the Chasseurs ardennais were revived in 1946. The formation formed part of the Belgian Forces in Germany and subsequently participated in a range of international peacekeeping and NATO missions. It was reduced to its current strength in 2011.

After its inception, the Chasseurs ardennais has adopted a distinctive green basque-style beret and insignia depicting a wild boar.

== History ==
=== Creation and early history, 1933–1936 ===
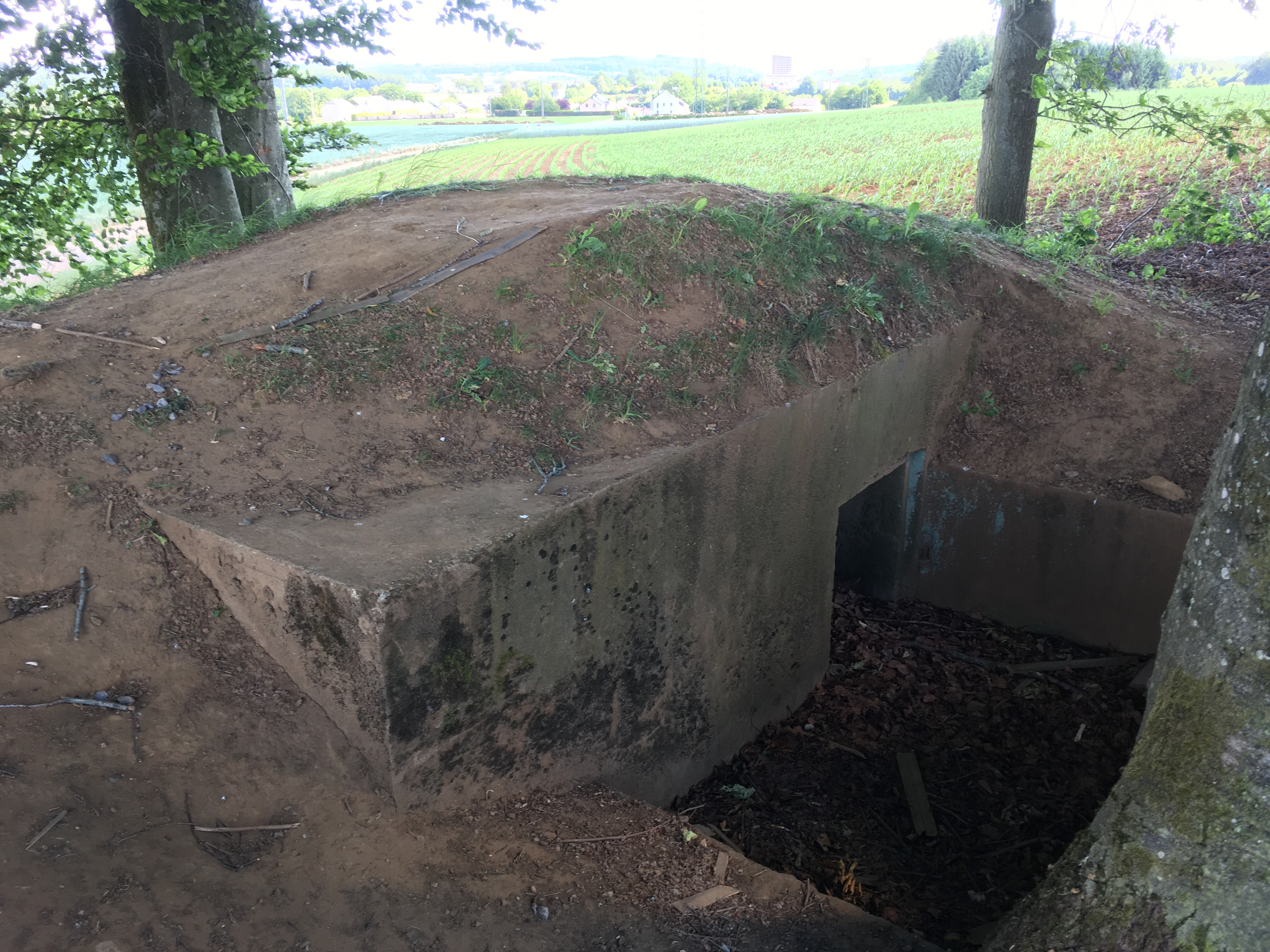
A modern view of a concrete shelter in the Ligne Devèze near Arlon along the south-eastern border with Germany and Luxembourg created as part of the policy for the "integral defense of the territory" before its abandonment in 1936.

Belgian military planners had long been aware of the particular vulnerability of the Province of Luxembourg in the south-east which was situated in a relatively undefended region south of the Fortified Position of Namur and the Fortified Position of Liège. Albert Devèze, Liberal Minister of Defence from 1932 to 1936, demanded the creation of a new élite light infantry unit in the Belgian Army to protect the frontier in the region as part of his plan for the "integral defence of the territory" (défense intégrale du territoire) in the context of the ongoing military alliance with France. Similar ideas about the importance of frontier defence had circulated for several decades previously. The idea was partly inspired by the France's Chasseurs alpins and Italy's Alpini. Devèze's policy was criticised by some at the time, including General Émile Galet, for diluting the strength of the Belgian Army across the entire length of the country's eastern frontier and therefore making it impossible to concentrating the army's strength effectively in any one place.

On the initiative of Devèze and General Albert Hellebaut, the existing 10th Line Regiment (10^{e} Régiment de Ligne) based at Arlon was renamed the Regiment of Chasseurs ardennais (Régiment de Chasseurs ardennais, abbreviated to ChA) by royal decree on 10 March 1933. The new unit would be composed largely of volunteers rather than conscripts. Although the idea of a distinctive uniform was rejected, the Chasseurs adopted a distinctive green Basque-style beret in the style of the Chasseurs alpins. At the time, they were the only unit in the Belgian Army to wear a beret. At the same time, a series of 375 pillboxes were built along the Belgian frontier for the Chasseurs ardennais to defend as part of the so-called Ligne Devèze. As a replacement for the 10th Line Regiment, the 14th Line Regiment was created in June 1934.

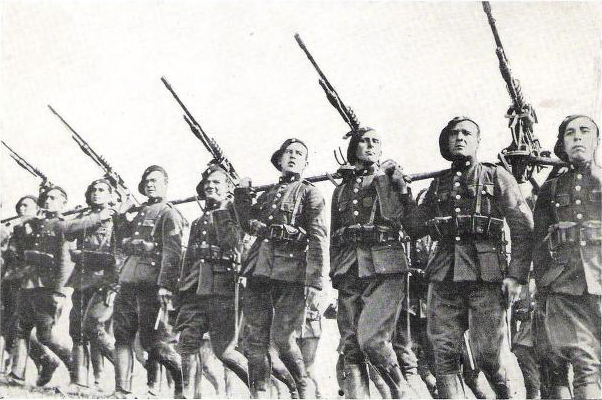
Chasseurs ardennais pictured in the interwar years, wearing the units' distinctive green berets, carrying Hotchkiss machine guns

After its foundation, the Chasseurs ardennais underwent a significant period of organisational change and expansion. The original regiment was replaced by three separate battalions of Chasseurs ardennais in August 1934 which were intended to form part of three "mixed groups" based at Arlon, Vielsalm, and Bastogne, where they would be supported by recently formed and highly mobile Frontier Cyclists Units (Unités cyclistes frontière) as well as supporting artillery formations. These latter units were absorbed into the new Artillery Group of the Chasseurs Ardennais (Groupe d’Artillerie des Chasseurs ardennais) in September 1934. The three mixed groups and the artillery group were, in turn, merged into a single "Corps of Chasseurs ardennais" (Corps des Chasseurs ardennais) in November 1934 based in Arlon and later Namur.

=== Belgian neutrality and expansion, 1936–1940 ===
After the end of Belgium's alliance with France in 1936 and its return to neutrality, the idea of frontier defence was abandoned as militarily impractical. The Chasseurs ardennais were briefly threatened with disbandment. Their new role in the event of a German invasion was to launch delaying actions whilst withdrawing to the other side of the Meuse river. Otherwise, the Chasseurs ardennais remained largely unchanged and continued to expand. The "mixed groups" were renamed "regiments" and the corps upgraded to division-status between March and July 1937. The artillery group, in turn, was expanded and became the Regiment of Artillery of the Chasseurs Ardennais (Régiment d'Artillerie des Chasseurs ardennais) in September 1938. Following the mobilization of the Belgian Army in late 1939 this division comprised 35,000 men, and a second division of three more regiments was created. The 1st Division was commanded at the outbreak of war by General Victor Descamps; the 2nd Division by General François Ley.

From its inception, the Chasseurs ardennais received an unusually large portion in receiving modern equipment. These included the new Mauser Model 1935 rifle and FN Model 1930 machine gun. By 1938, each regiment had 16 T-13 tank destroyers and three T-15 light tanks.

=== Second World War, 1940 ===
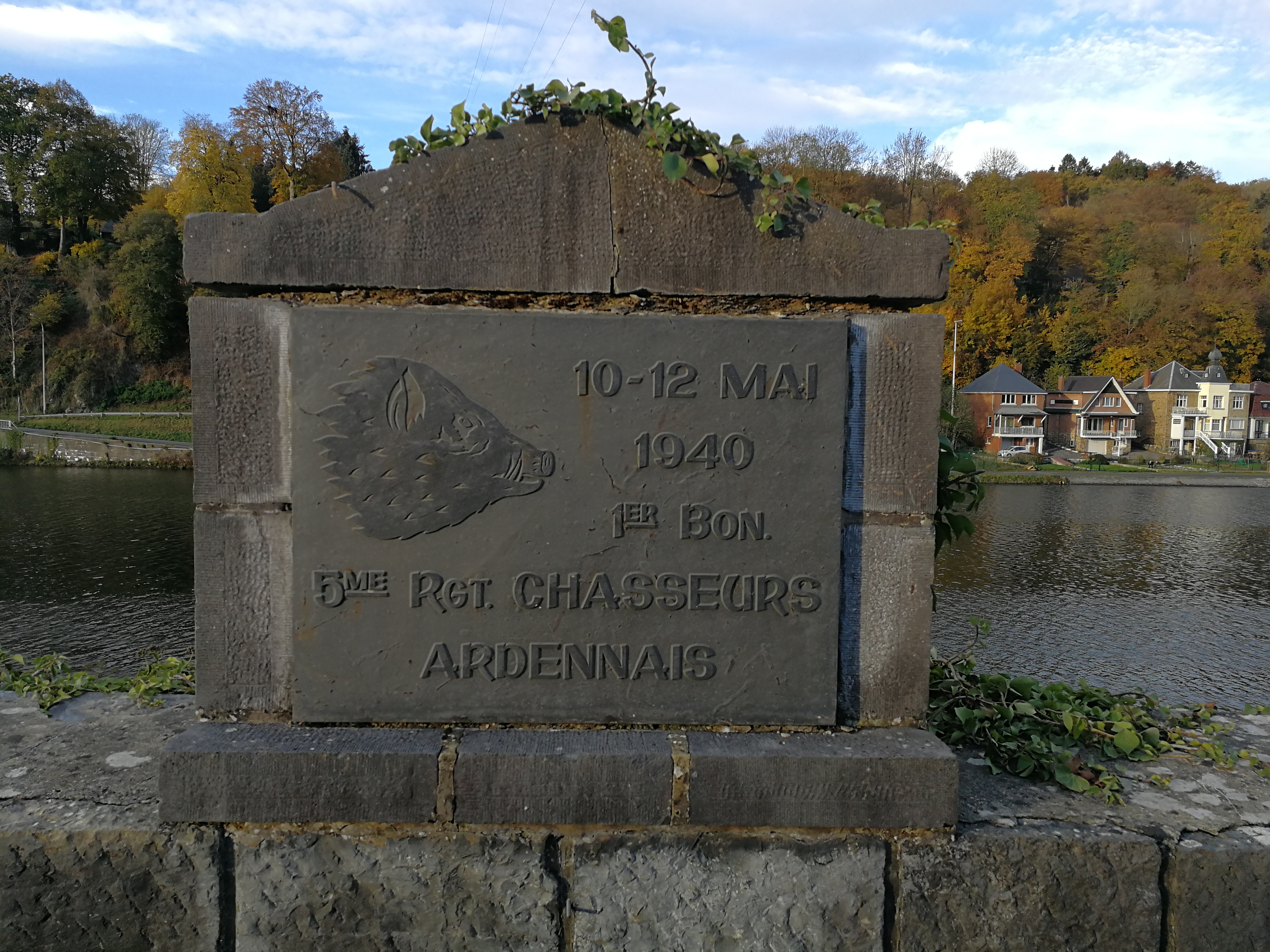
Monument commemorating the resistance by the 5th Regiment of Chasseurs ardennais at the bridge over the Meuse river at Yvoir (Province of Namur) on 10-12 May 1940

The German invasion of Belgium began in the early morning on 10 May 1940. Attacking with the benefit of surprise, the initial phase of the attack included the deployment of parachute units at Nives and Léglise in Belgian Luxembourg (Operation Niwi) to aid the main ground offensive. Consequently, lines of communications between the Belgian command with the local headquarters at Neufchâteau were disrupted and a number of Chasseurs ardennais units posted at the frontier did not receive the order to withdraw. An individual company of the 1st ChA resisted the main attacks from the 1st Panzer Division with considerable success at Bodange on the Sauer river throughout much of the first day of the invasion. Another company from the 3rd ChA similarly resisted the 7th Panzer Division at Chabrehez.

As the Belgian Army withdrew across the Meuse river on 10-11 May 1940, it proved impossible to establish a viable defensive position. The 1st Chasseurs Ardennais Division regrouped north of Namur and suffered heavy losses to German aerial attacks at Belgrade and Temploux suffering several hundred casualties. The two divisions were ordered to withdraw to the Leie (Lys) river in Flanders. Chasseurs ardennais units successfully held the front at Gottem, Deinze and Vinkt during the ensuing Battle of the Lys (24–28 May 1940) before the ultimate capitulation of the Belgian Army on 28 May 1940. The success of their resistance at Deinze and Vinkt provoked reprisal attacks against local civilians by the German 225th Infantry Division in the Vinkt massacre. As the historian Alain Colignon notes, the Chasseurs ardennais were "about the last to have maintained their cohesion and "fighting spirit"" and performed significantly better than other Belgian infantry units in combat.

=== Postwar history, 1945–present ===
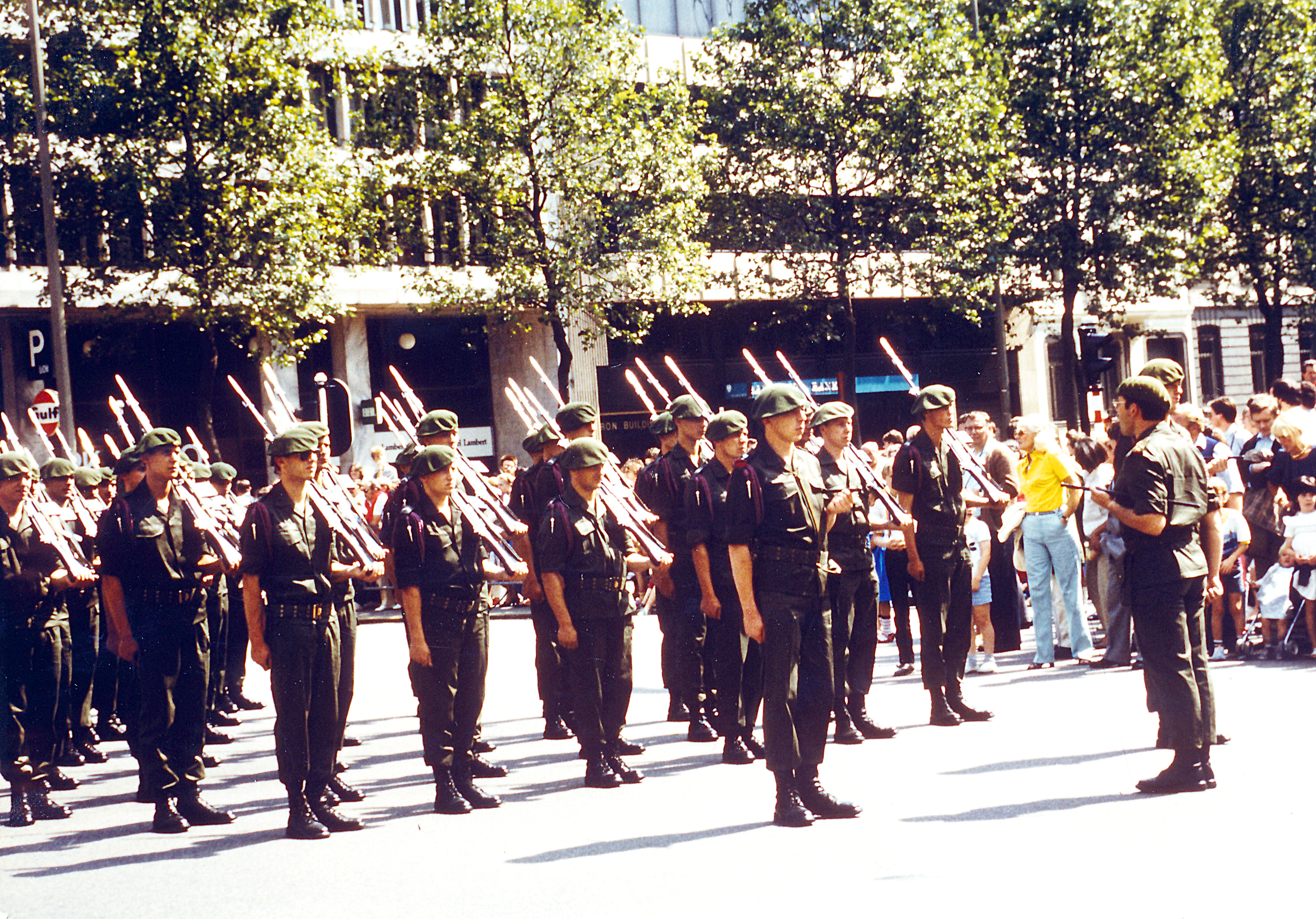
A detachment of the Regiment of Chasseurs Ardennais mustering ahead of the Belgian National Day parade on 21 July 1989 in Brussels.

After the Liberation of Belgium in 1944, the Belgian Army was gradually reformed and a number of newly-recruited units were sent for training in Northern Ireland in the final months of the conflict. A number of former members of the Chasseurs ardennais had been recruited into the 1st Battalion of the newly founded 4th "Steenstraete" Infantry Brigade which returned to Belgium in November 1945 and was later deployed as part of the Belgian Army of Occupation to participate in the Allied occupation of Germany. As part of the reorganisation of Belgian unit traditions, this battalion became the Battalion of Chasseurs Ardennais (Bataillon des Chasseurs Ardennais) in March 1946 and subsequently the 1st Battalion of Chasseurs ardennais, assuming the traditions of the earlier 1st Regiment. The green beret was reinstated in February 1947. Five further battalions were later also re-established.

In subsequent years, Chasseurs ardennais units were deployed to the Belgian Congo and Ruanda-Urundi at the time of decolonisation. It also participated in peacekeeping operations with the United Nations Protection Force (UNIPROFOR) and later Kosovo Force (KFOR) in the former Yugoslavia at the time of the Yugoslav wars. As part of the cuts to defense spending after the Cold War, the regiment was reduced to battalion-strength in 2011. It consisted of 415 men in 2015. Elements from the Chasseurs ardennais served as part of the International Security Assistance Force (ISAF) in the Afghanistan War.

== Battle honours ==
Manneken Pis in Brussels dressed in the costume of a Chasseur Ardennais in 2010

The unit's flag carries the following citations, some of which were inherited from the 10th Line Regiment:

- Namur
- Termonde
- Yser
- Esen
- Kortemark
- Ardennes
- La Dendre 1940
- Vinkt

Saint Hubertus is the patron saint of the unit.

== Uniform and insignia ==
The Chasseurs ardennais have, since their inception, worn a distinctive light green Basque-style beret. This is larger than the berets subsequently adopted by other units of the Belgian Army in the post-war period. The cap badge depicts the head of a wild boar which are found in the Ardennes region.

== Organisation ==
The Chasseurs Ardennais Battalion comprises:

- HQ staff
- 1st company
- 2nd company
- 3rd company
- service company
