= Frontier Cyclists =

Part of the Belgian Army from 1934 to 1940

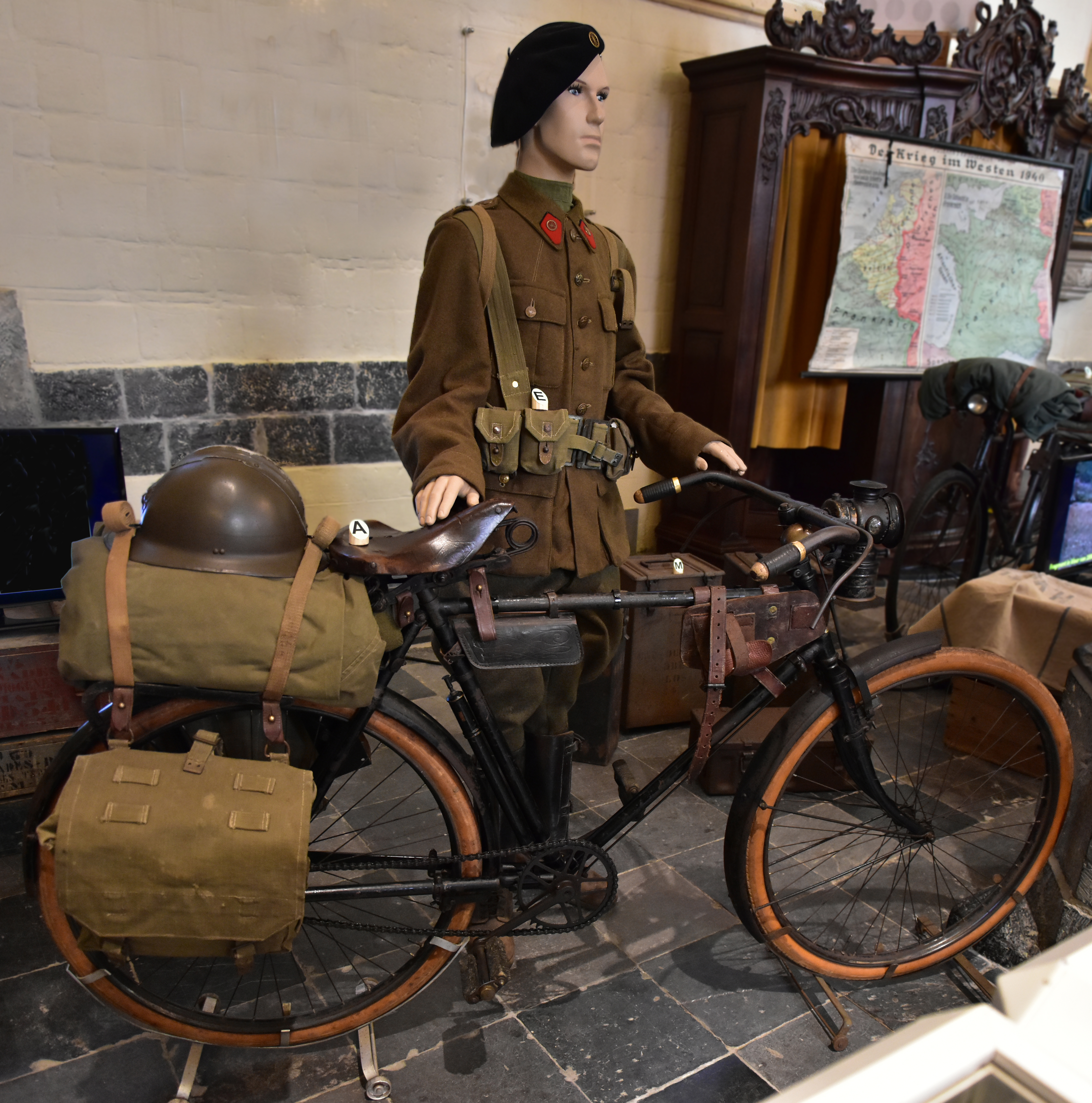
Museum display of the uniform and equipment of the Frontier Cyclists at the time of the German invasion of Belgium in May 1940.

The Frontier Cyclists (French: Cyclistes-frontière; Dutch: Grenswielrijders, officially abbreviated as CyFr) were bicycle infantry who served as part of the Belgian Army from 1934 to 1940.

A number of independent Units of Frontier Cyclists (Unités Cyclistes-frontière) were formed in 1934 in order to guard the advanced frontier posts along the country's eastern frontiers in the provinces of Limburg, Liège, and Luxembourg. As part of a reorganisation in October 1937, these units were brought together as part of a single Regiment of Frontier Cyclists (Régiment Cyclistes-frontière, Regiment Grenswielrijders) still spread over the same territory. At the time of its formation, it was intended that the units should be formed from professional soldiers rather than conscripts. Its personnel wore a distinctive royal blue Basque-style beret.

Following the mobilisation of the Belgian Army after the German invasion of Poland, the Frontier Cyclists Regiment was expanded and split into two separate regiments in March 1940, namely the 1st Frontier Cyclist Regiment (1er régiment de cyclistes-frontière) and 2nd Frontier Cyclist Regiment (2e régiment de cyclistes-frontière). An independent battalion was also retained in Limburg. The formations were issued with some T-13 tank destroyers.

After the German invasion of Belgium, the Frontier Cyclists participated in the retreat and were notably involved in the fighting at the Willebroek Canal in May 1940.

After the war, the Frontier Cyclists were not revived as part of the reformation of the Belgian Army. The regimental traditions of the two units were passed, respectively, onto the 1st and 4th Battalions of Heavy Tanks (Bataillon de Tanks Lourds) formed in 1951 and 1952.

== See also ==
- Chasseurs ardennais
