= Teting-sur-Nied =

- Commune
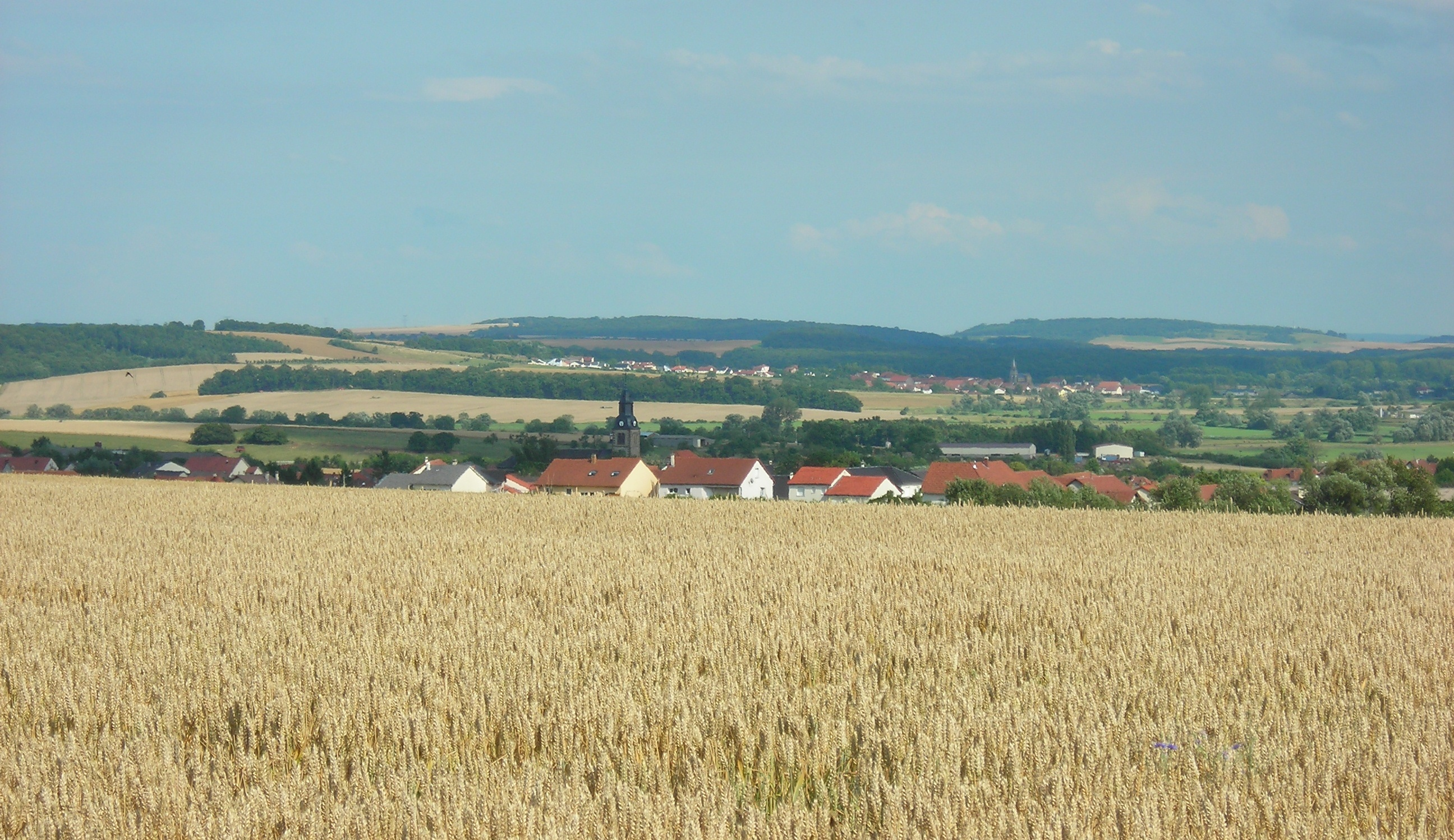
- A general view of Teting-sur-Nied

- Coat of arms
- Location of Teting-sur-Nied
- Location within France Location within Grand Est
- Coordinates: 49°03′28″N 6°39′51″E
- Country: France
- Region: Grand Est
- Department: Moselle
- Arrondissement: Forbach-Boulay-Moselle
- Canton: Faulquemont
- Intercommunality: CC District urbain de Faulquemont

Government
  - Mayor (2020–2026): Guy Jacques
- Area^{1}: 9.83 km^{2} (3.80 sq mi)
- Highest elevation: 357 m (1,171 ft)
- Lowest elevation: 245 m (804 ft)
- Population (2023): 1,258
  - Density: 128/km^{2} (331/sq mi)
- Time zone: UTC+01:00 (CET)
  - Summer (DST): UTC+02:00 (CEST)
- INSEE/Postal code: 57668 /57385
- ^{1} French Land Register data, which excludes lakes, ponds, glaciers > 1 km^{2} (0.386 sq mi or 247 acres) and river estuaries.

Teting-sur-Nied (French pronunciation: [tetɛ̃ syʁ nje], literally Teting on Nied; German: Tetingen) is a commune in the Moselle department in Grand Est in north-eastern France.

== See also ==
- Communes of the Moselle department
