= Franco-Belgian Accord of 1920 =

1920 defense pact between France and Belgium

The Franco-Belgian Military Accord of 1920 (French: Accord militaire franco-belge de 1920) was a collective defense pact signed between France and Belgium in September 1920. The Accord was cancelled in 1936 as Belgium returned to pursuing a policy of neutrality, which it would continue until being invaded by Germany early in the Second World War.

== Background ==
After the experience of the German invasion of the country in 1914, Belgian governments after World War I were anxious to secure a defensive alliance against a possible future threat from Weimar Germany. However, the government were anxious that Belgium should not become a mere protectorate of France and was reluctant to risk being dragged into a war by an ally attempting to enforce terms of the 1919 Treaty of Versailles.

France was keen to secure Belgian involvement in the League of Nations' 15-year occupation of the Rhineland. It was also conscious of the potential strategic benefit of strengthening its regional alliance in a future war with Germany. For similar reasons, the French also around the same time entered into the Franco-Polish alliance (1921) and Franco-Czechoslovak alliance (1924).

== Agreement ==
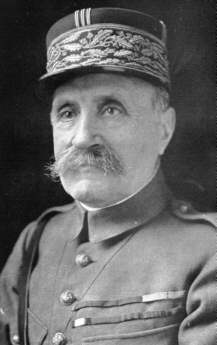
Ferdinand Foch, the French chief negotiator

The pact was negotiated in April 1920 and signed on 7 September. Ferdinand Foch was the chief negotiator for the French, though he failed to gain a union of French and Belgian armies and agreements over mobilization which he sought. Though British participation was requested, it was rejected by the government.

The first article outlined an agreement including both French and Belgian soldiers in the occupation of the Rhineland. It also stated, that in the event of German rearmament, both countries would mobilise their reserves. The second article discussed greater integration of frontier defenses, while the third article announced greater co-operation between General Staffs.

== Perception ==
The agreement was initially met with general approval in Belgium. However support for the pact was split down regional lines with the Walloon population favoring closer military ties with France unlike the Flemish population which was opposed what they perceived as rising French influence in the country.

Most modern historians regard the treaty, together with other French military alliances of the period, as failures, because they failed to create a strong alliance network that was capable of preventing the projection of German power in the late 1930s.

== End of the treaty ==
The treaty was formally abrogated by Belgium in 1936, with King Leopold III announcing in a speech to the country's Council of Ministers on 14 October that the country must keep itself "outside the quarrels of our neighbours"; the government returned to pursuing a policy of neutrality. The Belgian government preferred the construction of fortifications such as the Devèze Line; and gaining assurances of neutrality from surrounding countries, including Nazi Germany; to risking entanglement in another war through an alliance structure.
