= Structure of the Belgian Armed Forces =

This article represents the structure of the Belgian Armed Forces as of October 2025:

== Chief of Defence ==
The Belgian Armed Forces are headed by the Chief of Defence with the rank of General, who is assisted by a Vice-Chief of Staff and three Assistant Chief of Staff (ACOS) with the rank of Lieutenant General. Six general directorates headed by Major Generals manage the bureaucratic aspects of the Belgian Armed Forces.

- Chief of Defence
  - Vice-Chief of Defence
    - Policy & Governance Support Cluster (Gv Spt)
    - Staff Department Strategy (ACOS Strat)
  - Staff Department Operations and Training (ACOS Ops & Trg)
  - Staff Department Intelligence and Security (ACOS IS)
  - Defense Inspector General
  - General Directorate Health & Well-being (DG H&WB)
  - General Directorate Legal Support (DG Jur)
  - General Directorate Strategic Communication (DG StratCom)
  - General Directorate Budget and Finances (DG BF)
  - General Directorate Material Resources (DG MR)
  - General Directorate Human Resources (DG HR)
  - Belgian Army
  - Belgian Air Force
  - Belgian Navy
  - Belgian Medical Service
  - Belgian Cyber Force

=== Belgian Army ===
The Belgian Army (French: Force Terrestre Dutch: Landmacht) is commanded by a Major general and has the following organization:

- Belgian Army headquarters in Evere

==== 1st Brigade ====
The 1st Brigade is the Belgian land formation assigned to NATO.

- Medium Brigade, in Leopoldsburg
  - 1 × headquarters and services company, in Leopoldsburg (carrying the traditions of the 8th/9th Regiment of the Line)
  - Jagers te Paard (Intelligence, Surveillance, Target Acquisition, and Reconnaissance ISTAR), in Heverlee (will move to Marche-en-Famenne)
    - 1 × headquarters and services squadron, 2 × reconnaissance squadrons, 1 × radar and ground sensors squadron, 1 × training squadron
  - 2/4 Lansiers, in Leopoldsburg (reactivated on 2 September 2025)
    - 1 × headquarters and services squadron, 3 × cavalry reconnaissance squadrons with Piranha IIIC and Dingo 2 vehicles (will be replaced in 2028 by EBRC Jaguars), 1 × reconnaissance and intervention squadron (which will be equipped with Véhicule blindé d'aide à l'engagement (VBAE))
  - Bataljon Bevrijding – 5 Linie, in Leopoldsburg
    - 1 × headquarters and services company, 3 × infantry companies with Piranha IIIC wheeled armoured fighting vehicles (will be replaced by VBMR Griffons), 1 × combat support company
  - Carabiniers Prins Boudewijn – Grenadiers, in Lombardsijde
    - 1 × headquarters and services company, 3 × infantry companies with Piranha IIIC wheeled armoured fighting vehicles (will be replaced by VBMR Griffons), 1 × combat support company
  - Artillery Battalion, in Brasschaat
    - 1 × headquarters and services battery, 2 × field artillery batteries with 8 × CAESAR NG self-propelled howitzers, 1 × mortar battery with 12 × VBMR Griffon MEPAC mortar carriers, 1 × unmanned aerial systems battery with loitering munitions, 1 × short-range air defense battery with counter-unmanned aerial systems and very short range air defense (VSHORAD) systems, 1 × fire coordination battery with joint terminal attack controller (JTAC) teams, C2 elements, artillery radars and sensors
  - 11th Engineer Battalion, in Burcht
    - 1 × headquarters and services company, 4 × combat engineer companies, 1× general support company
  - 18th Logistic Battalion, in Leopoldsburg (one company scheduled to move to Lombardsijde, while the rest will transfer to a new base at Schendelbeke near Geraardsbergen)
    - 1 × headquarters and services company, 1 × supply company, 1 × transport company, 1 × maintenance company
  - 10th Communication and Information Systems (CIS) Group, in Leopoldsburg
  - Reconnaissance Squadron, with VBMR-L Serval vehicles (which will be replaced by Véhicule blindé d'aide à l'engagement (VBAE))
  - Multi-sensor Intelligence Support Squadron, with VBMR-L Serval vehicles, radars and Integrator tactical drones
  - Tactical Drones Squadron, with VBMR-L Serval vehicles and armed drones
  - Military Police Company (detached from the Military Police Group), with LMV and VBMR-L Serval vehicles
  - Civil-Military Engagement and PsyOps Group (detached from the Civil-Military Engagement Group), with LMV and VBMR-L Serval vehicles

==== 7th Brigade ====
The 7th Brigade was reactivated on 6 February 2026 in Marche-en-Famenne.

- 7th Brigade, in Marche-en-Famenne
  - Unmanned Aerial Systems Battalion, with loitering munitions and armed tactical drones (will be formed by 2028)
  - 1^{er}/3^{e} Lanciers, in Marche-en-Famenne
    - 1 × headquarters and services squadron, 3 × cavalry reconnaissance squadrons with Piranha IIIC and Dingo 2 vehicles (will be replaced in 2028 by EBRC Jaguars), 1 × reconnaissance and intervention squadron (which will be equipped with Véhicule blindé d'aide à l'engagement (VBAE))
  - 12^{e} de ligne Prince Léopold – 13^{e} de ligne, in Spa
    - 1 × headquarters and services company, 3 × infantry companies with Dingo 2 infantry mobility vehicles (will be replaced by VBMR Griffons)
  - Chasseurs Ardennais, in Marche-en-Famenne
    - 1 × headquarters and services company, 3 × infantry companies with Dingo 2 infantry mobility vehicles (will be replaced by VBMR Griffons)
  - Artillery Battalion, in Marche-en-Famenne (will be formed by 2030)
    - 1 × headquarters and services battery, 1 × field artillery battery with 8 × CAESAR NG self-propelled howitzers, 1 × mortar battery with 12 × VBMR Griffon MEPAC mortar carriers, 1 × unmanned aerial systems battery with loitering munitions, 1 × short-range air defense battery with counter-unmanned aerial systems and very short range air defense (VSHORAD) systems, 1 × fire coordination battery with joint terminal attack controller (JTAC) teams, C2 elements, artillery radars and sensors
  - 4th Engineer Battalion, in Amay
    - 1 × headquarters and services company, Light Combat Engineers Company, Combat Engineers Company, Construction Company, CBRN-defense Company
  - 4th Logistic Battalion, in Marche-en-Famenne
    - 1 × headquarters and services company, 1 × supply company, 1 × transport company, 1 × maintenance company
  - 4th Communication and Information Systems Group, in Marche-en-Famenne
  - Military Police Company (detached from the Military Police Group), with LMV and VBMR-L Serval vehicles
  - Civil-Military Engagement and PsyOps Group (detached from the Civil-Military Engagement Group), with LMV and VBMR-L Serval vehicles

==== Special Operations Regiment ====
The Special Operations Regiment combines the Belgian paratroopers, special operations and special forces units. All units of the regiment are airborne qualified.

- Special Operations Regiment, in Heverlee
  - Headquarters and Services Company, in Heverlee (carrying the traditions of the 4th Commando Battalion)
  - Special Forces Group, in Heverlee
  - 2nd Commando Battalion, in Flawinne
    - Headquarters and Services Company, 12th, 13th, and 16th commando companies
  - 3rd Paratroopers Battalion, in Tielen
    - Headquarters and Services Company, 17th, 21st and 22nd paratrooper companies
  - 6th Communication and Information Systems Group, in Peutie
  - Commando Training Center, in Marche-les-Dames
  - Paratroopers Training Center, at Schaffen Air Base

==== Joint and General Support Land ====
- Joint and General Support Land
  - Bataillon des Guides – Chasseurs luxembourgeois (Bn G/ChL), in Arlon (being formed)
    - 1 × headquarters and services squadron, 2 × Belgian cavalry reconnaissance squadrons, 2 × Luxembourgish cavalry reconnaissance squadrons in Sanem in Luxembourg (will be equipped with EBRC Jaguar, VBMR Griffon and VBMR-L Serval vehicles)
  - Bridge Engineer Battalion, (to be formed after 2028)
  - Explosive Ordnance Disposal Battalion, in Oud-Heverlee
  - 8th Logistic Battalion (Reception, Staging and Onward Movement), in Charleroi
  - 29th Logistic Battalion (National Support Element), in Grobbendonk
  - Transport Battalion, (to be formed after 2028)
  - Movement Control Group, in Peutie
  - Civil-Military Engagement Group, in Heverlee and Nieuwpoort (Civil-military co-operation & psychological warfare unit)
  - Military Police Group, in Evere
    - Alpha Detachment, in Evere covers the province of Flemish Brabant and the city of Brussels
    - Bravo Detachment, in Nivelles covers the provinces of Walloon Brabant, Hainaut and Namur
    - Charlie Detachment, in Marche-en-Famenne covers the provinces of Liege and Luxembourg
    - Delta Detachment, in Leopoldsburg covers the provinces of Limburg and Antwerp
    - Echo Detachment, in Lombardsijde covers the provinces of West Flanders and East Flanders
  - Field Accommodation Unit, at Beauvechain Air Base (a company-sized unit tasked with building military camps for out of area operations)

==== Training and Education Land ====
- Training and Education Land
  - Belgian Army Competence Center, in Leopoldsburg
    - Competence Center - Engineer Department, in Namur
    - Competence Center - Maneuver Department, in Stockem
  - Training Camp Elsenborn, in Bütgenbach
  - Training Camp Lagland, in Arlon
  - Training Camp Beverlo, near Leopoldsburg
  - Training Camp Marche, near Marche-en-Famenne

=== Belgian Air Force ===
The Belgian Air Force (French: Force Aérienne, Dutch: Luchtmacht) is commanded by a Major general and has the following organization:

- Belgian Air Force Command, in Evere
  - Air Traffic Control Center, in Semmerzake
  - Control and Reporting Center, at Beauvechain Air Base, reports to NATO's Integrated Air Defence System CAOC Uedem in Germany
  - Belgian Air Force Competence Center, at Beauvechain Air Base
    - Basic Flying Training School, at Beauvechain Air Base
      - 5th Squadron, with SF.260D/M+ trainers
      - 9th Squadron, with SF.260D/M+ trainers
      - Military Glider Center, with L21B Super Cub and a variety of gliders
    - Joint K-9 Unit, in Oud-Heverlee
  - 2nd Squadron, at Florennes Air Base with four (later 6) MQ-9B SkyGuardian unmanned aerial vehicles
  - Aviation Safety Directorate, at Beauvechain Air Base

==== 1st Wing ====
The 1st Wing operates all helicopters, with the exception of the NH90 NFH helicopters supporting the Belgian Navy.

- 1st Wing, at Beauvechain Air Base
  - Flying Group
    - 15th Squadron (Operational Conversion and Training Unit), with AW109BA Hirundo helicopters (to be replaced with H145M helicopters)
    - 17th Squadron, with AW109BA Hirundo helicopters (to be replaced with H145M helicopters)
    - 18th Squadron, (Squadron's NH90 TTH helicopters retired in September 2025)
    - 40th Squadron, at Koksijde Air Base with NH90 NFH helicopters
    - Operations Squadron
      - Air Traffic Control, Bird Control Unit, Fire Department, Meteorological Department, Wing Operations
  - Maintenance Group
    - Aircraft Maintenance Squadron
    - Flight Line and Armament Squadron
    - Electronics and Communications Squadron
    - Transport and Logistic Support Squadron
  - Defence and Support Group
    - Force Protection Squadron
    - Security Squadron
    - Support Squadron

==== 2nd Tactical Wing ====
The 2nd Tactical Wing is one of two Belgian Air Force fighter wings and operates F-16AM Falcon fighters, which are being replaced by F-35A Lightning II.

- 2nd Tactical Wing, at Florennes Air Base
  - Flying Group
    - 1st Squadron, with F-35A Lightning II
    - 350th Squadron, with F-16AM Falcon (will receive F-35A Lightning II in 2026)
    - Operations Squadron
      - Air Traffic Control, Bird Control Unit, Fire Department, Meteorological Department, Wing Operations
  - Maintenance Group
    - Aircraft Maintenance Squadron
    - Flight Line and Armament Squadron
    - Electronics and Communications Squadron
    - Transport and Logistic Support Squadron
  - Defence and Support Group
    - Force Protection Squadron
    - Security Squadron
    - Support Squadron

==== 10th Tactical Wing ====
The 10th Tactical Wing is one of two Belgian Air Force fighter wings and operates F-16AM/BM Falcon fighters, which will be replaced by F-35A Lightning II from 2023. As part of NATO's nuclear sharing the US Air Force's 701st Munitions Support Squadron, 52nd Fighter Wing stores B61 tactical nuclear weapons at Kleine Brogel for use with Belgian F-16AM Falcon.

- 10th Tactical Wing, at Kleine Brogel Air Base
  - Flying Group
    - 31st Squadron (Nuclear strike), with F-16AM Falcon (will receive F-35A Lightning II in 2027)
    - 349th Squadron, with F-16AM Falcon (will receive F-35A Lightning II in 2027)
    - Operational Conversion Unit, with F-16BM Falcon (will disband after the introduction of the F-35A Lightning II)
    - Operations Squadron
      - Air Traffic Control, Bird Control Unit, Fire Department, Meteorological Department, Wing Operations
  - Maintenance Group
    - Aircraft Maintenance Squadron
    - Flight Line and Armament Squadron
    - Electronics and Communications Squadron
    - Transport and Logistic Support Squadron
  - Defence and Support Group
    - Force Protection Squadron
    - Security Squadron
    - Support Squadron

==== 15th Air Transport Wing ====
15th Air Transport Wing operates the tactical and strategic airlift aircraft of the Belgian Armed Forces. Additionally it provides VIP transport services to the Belgian government.

- 15th Air Transport Wing, at Melsbroek Air Base
  - Flying Group
    - 20th Squadron (Tactical airlift), with 8 × A400M Atlas, one A400M is owned and partially operated by the Luxembourg Air Wing
    - 21st Squadron (VIP transport), with 2 × Falcon 7X aircraft
    - Training and Conversion Unit
    - Operations Squadron
      - Air Traffic Control, Bird Control Unit, Fire Department, Meteorological Department, Wing Operations
  - Maintenance Group
    - Aircraft Maintenance Squadron
    - Flight Line and Armament Squadron
    - Electronics and Communications Squadron
    - Transport and Logistic Support Squadron
  - Defence and Support Group
    - Force Protection Squadron
    - Security Squadron
    - Support Squadron

==== Meteorological Wing ====
The Meteorological Wing provides meteorological services to the Belgian Armed Forces and operates 10 remotely operated weather stations across Belgium.

- Meteorological Wing, at Beauvechain Air Base
  - Military Meteorological Forecasting Center
  - Meteorological School
  - Maintenance Workshop
  - Meteorological Telecommunications Unit

=== Belgian Navy ===
The Belgian Navy (Dutch: Marine French: Marine) is commanded by a Divisional admiral. The Belgian Navy's ships fall operationally under the joint Belgian-Dutch Maritime Headquarters Benelux in Den Helder, which is commanded by the Dutch Admiral Benelux. The commander of the Belgian Navy doubles as Deputy Admiral Benelux.

==== Maritime Headquarters Benelux ====
- Maritime Headquarters Benelux, in Den Helder
  - Operations Directorate
  - Operational Support Directorate
    - Karel Doorman-class frigate Maintenance - Royal Dutch Navy
    - Tripartite-class minehunter Maintenance - Belgian Navy

==== Belgian Navy Operational Command ====
- Belgian Navy Operational Command, in Zeebrugge
  - Navy Competence Center, in Bruges
  - Navy Logistics Center, in Zeebrugge
  - Naval Base Zeebrugge, in Zeebrugge
    - Karel Doorman-class frigates F930 Leopold I, and F931 Louise-Marie
    - Tripartite-class minehunters M916 Bellis, M917 Crocus, M921 Lobelia, and M924 Primula
    - Castor-class patrol vessels P901 Castor and P902 Pollux
    - Schoolschip A958 Zenobe Gramme

=== Belgian Medical Service ===
The Belgian Medical Service (French: Service Médical Dutch: Medische Dienst) is commanded by a Major General and has the following organization:

- Belgian Medical Service, in Evere
  - Belgian Medical Service Competence Center, in Neder-Over-Heembeek
  - Queen Astrid Military Hospital, in Neder-Over-Heembeek
  - 14th Medical Battalion, in Peutie and Lombardsijde
    - Headquarters and Services Company, 3 × medical companies (one company supports the Belgian Air Force, one company supports the Navy, and one airborne qualified company supports the Special Operations Regiment)
  - 23rd Medical Battalion, in Leopoldsburg and Marche-en-Famenne
    - Headquarters and Services Company, 3 × medical companies (supporting the Motorized Brigade)
  - 5th Medical Supplies and Distribution Element, in Nivelles

== Armed Forces organization graphic ==
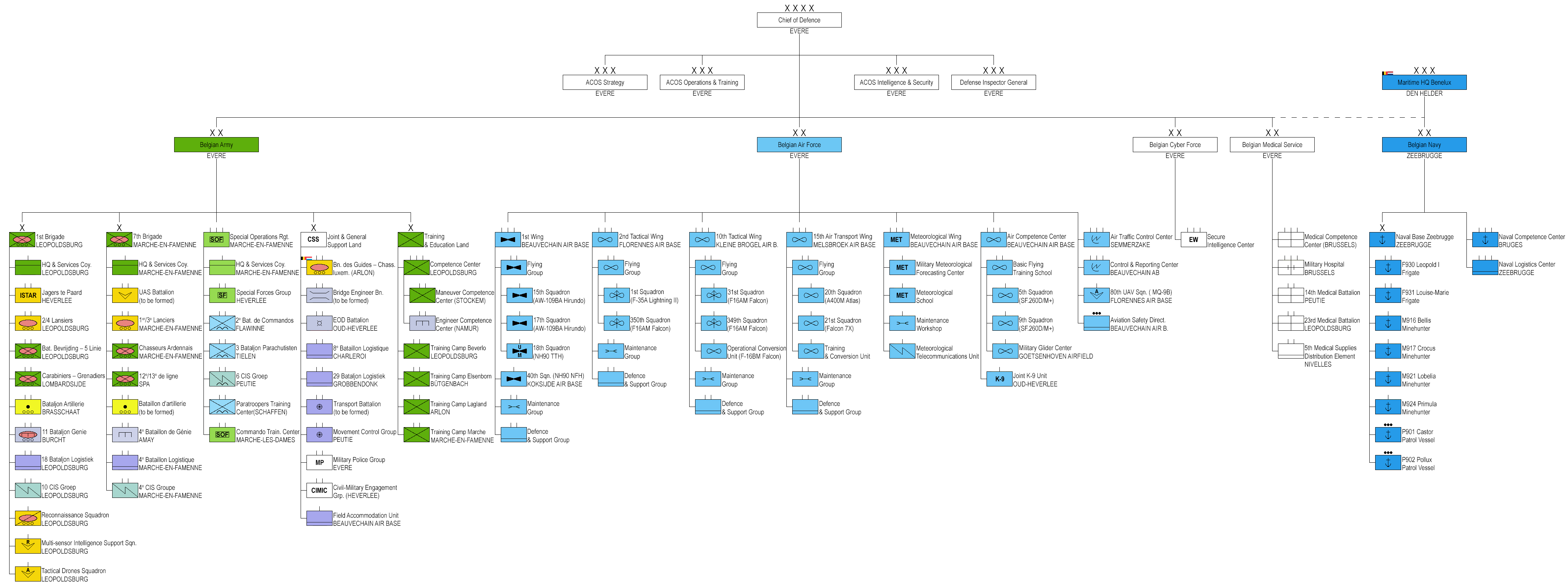
Belgian Armed Forces organization 2025-2028 (click to enlarge)

== Geographic distribution of operational units ==
Belgian Armed Forces locations 2020

Belgian Army: Reconnaissance Infantry Commandos/ Paratroopers Special Forces Artillery Engineers CIS Logistics Military Police

Belgian Air Force: Fighter bases Helicopter bases Other units

Belgian Medical Service: Medical units
