= List of active units of the Belgian Army =

This is a list of military units and formations currently active in the Belgian Army with effect from February 2026 when the military was reorganised in four main operational entities under the 2025 Strategic Vision published by the De Wever government.

The current head of the Belgian Army is Major-General Gert Van Goethem.

Some of the units in the Belgian Army, such as the 12/13th Line Battalion, have names consisting of multiple elements. This is the result of a series of amalgamations that took place over the years. For example, the 12/13th Line Battalion was created in 1993 as a result of the merger of the 12th "Prince Leopold" Line Regiment and the 13th Line Regiment.

== 1st Brigade ==
The 1st Brigade is a brigade consisting of Dutch-speaking or bilingual units which is headquartered at Leopoldsburg.

It consists of:

- Liberation/5th Line Battalion
- Prince Baudouin Carabiniers/Grenadiers Battalion
- 2/4 Lancers
- 11th Engineer Battalion
- 10th Group CIS
- 18th Logistics Battalion
- Battalion of Horse Chasseurs
- Artillery Battalion

== 7th Brigade ==
Insignia of the 7th Brigade

The 7th Brigade consists of French-speaking units and is based at Marche-en-Famenne.

It consists of:

- Battalion of Chasseurs Ardennais
- 12/13th Line Battalion
- 1/3 Lanciers
- 4th Engineer Battalion
- 4th Group CIS
- 4th Logistics Battalion
- 2nd Artillery Battalion

== Special Operations Regiment ==
The Special Operations Regiment (SO Regt) is a special forces and rapid reaction force.

It consists of two separate parts:

- Special Forces Group (SF Gp)
- Para-Commandos:
  - 2nd Commando Battalion
  - 3rd Parachute Battalion
  - 6th Group CIS

== Sustainment and Enablement Regiment ==
The Sustainment and Enablement Regiment (SE Regt) includes ancillary units such as bomb disposal and military police formations.

== Competence Centre for the Land Forces ==
The Competence Centre for the Land Forces (Centre de Compétence de la Force Terrestre, CC Army) consists of the military schools and training camps.
