= 1st Fusilier Battalion =

- 1ste Bataljon Fuseliers | 1^{er} Bataillon Fusiliers
- Shoulder insignia of the 1st Fusilier Battalion
- Active: 10 June 2026 – present
- Country: Belgium
- Type: Infantry
- Role: Home guard
- Size: 350–400
- Garrison/HQ: Amay
- Mottos: Custodes Patriae (Guardians of the Fatherland)

Commanders
- Current commander: Lieutenant-Colonel Michel Paquay

The 1st Fusilier Battalion (Dutch: 1ste Bataljon Fuseliers; French: 1^{er} Bataillon Fusiliers) is a unit of the Belgian Army's Territorial Reserve. The Belgian Ministry of Defence chose the name fusiliers, referring to the Belgian Fusilier Battalions of 1944–1945, thus deliberately drawing on an important chapter in Belgian military history.

== Formation ==
It was established in Peutie on June 10, 2026. It was created to train reservists for military duties on Belgian territory as part of the country's year-of-military-service programme.

The battalion is responsible for Flemish Brabant, Walloon Brabant and the Brussels-Capital Region. Its headquarters is temporarily located in Amay. It is part of a planned structure of 5 Territorial Reserve battalions covering all of Belgium. Following the 1st Battalion, there will be battalions for Antwerp and Limburg, Luxembourg, Namur and the other Flemish provinces. Each of the 5 battalions should ultimately have 2 companies in each province.

The Defence Minister Theo Francken hailed the unit as "a historic step forward in rebuilding a territorial reserve that will make our country stronger, more resilient and safer."

== Role ==
The Territorial Reserve supports domestic security and protects critical infrastructure, transport routes, and logistical operations. It also supports the movement of NATO forces through Belgium and helps relieve active military units so they can focus on operations abroad.

The reserve operates exclusively on Belgian territory and remains under Belgian national command. In times of crisis, its personnel may also help maintain essential services and support civil authorities.

== Organisation and training ==
The planned organisation includes companies based in Berlaar, Peutie and Amay. Each company has roughly 125 recruits and the battalion's initial training programme is supported by three existing units, respectively: the 11th Engineer Battalion in Burcht, the Jagers te Paard Battalion in Heverlee and the 4th Engineer Battalion.

Training takes place as part of Belgium's year-of-military-service programme and includes basic and specialist military instruction, exercises and operational preparation. Other activities may include surveillance missions, operational support and ceremonial duties such as standing guard at the Royal Palace.

The new year of military service began on September 1, 2026. It will start with a week of administrative induction, followed by 10 weeks of basic training, 4 weeks of specialist training and an operational phase comprising exercises and mission preparation.

== Motto ==
The new unit's motto is "Custodes Patriae" (Guardians of the Fatherland), and its shoulder insignia bears the words: Protect. Enable. Defend.

== Sources ==
- fbb (2026-06-12). "Coup d'envoi de la reconstruction de la Réserve Territoriale : création du premier bataillon de Fusiliers" [The re-establishment of the Territorial Reserve gets underway: formation of the 1st Fusiliers battalion]. francken.belgium.be (in French).
- Verhavert, Stefanie (2026-06-13). "Avec le 1er Bataillon Fusiliers, la nouvelle réserve territoriale voit le jour" [With the 1st Fusiliers Battalion, the new Territorial Reserve is established]. mil.be (in French).
