= 51st Logistics Battalion (Belgium) =

- Country: Belgium
- Branch: Land Component
- Type: Logistics
- Garrison/HQ: Sijsele

The 51st Logistics Battalion (Dutch: 51 Bataljon Logistiek) is a logistics battalion in the Land Component of the Belgian Armed Forces.
