= 10th Group CIS =

10th Group Communication and Information Systems
- Active: 10 July 2003
- Country: Belgium
- Branch: Belgian Army
- Type: Signals
- Part of: Motorized Brigade
- Garrison/HQ: Leopoldsburg

The 10th Group Communication and Information Systems is a military communications unit in the Belgian Army of the Belgian Armed Forces. The 10th Group CIS operates and maintains secure communications and information systems at strategic, operational and tactical level, and their Regional Support and Service Center provides technical support to other units in its area of operation.

The 10th Group CIS was established in 2003 and supported the Medium Brigade in accordance with the Transformation Plan of the Belgian Army. On November 22, 2018, the Medium Brigade was restructured into the Motorized Brigade and incorporates both the 10th Groups CIS and its sister unit 4th Group CIS.

== Sources ==
- De Gemotoriseerde Brigade Evolution of the Motorized Brigade, retrieved October 23, 2023.
- Strada Lex Kamer van Volksvertegenwoordiger snr 50-342 Krijgsmacht Chamber of Representatives, Question and Answer No 0342 on network management, data communication and support by the CIS Groups RSSC's in 2003, retrieved 24 October 2023.
- Opendeur Motorized Brigade Leopoldsburg, list with units Moterized Brigade, retrieved October 23, 2023.
- Gemotoriseerde Brigade ziet het levenslicht, establishment Motorized Brigade on 22 November 2018, (archived) retrieved July 15, 2019.
- Belgische Kamer van Volksvertegenwoordigers QRVA 19698-19699 Questions Belgian Chamber of Representatives - Management Network and data communication systems by CIS, page 60-61, retrieved October 24, 2023.
- 4 Groep CIS traint interoperabiliteit, Capacité Motorisée (CaMo) training with French Army signals units, retrieved October 23, 2023.
