= Belgian Senate Committee on Foreign Relations and Defence =

The Committee on Foreign Relations and Defence (Dutch: Commissie voor de Buitenlandse Betrekkingen en de Landsverdediging, French: Commission des Relations extérieures et de la Défense) is a standing committee of the Belgian Senate. It is responsible for all matters related to the foreign affairs and the defence of Belgium. Because the Federal Government submits bills regarding the approval of international and bilateral treaties and agreements to the Senate first, before they move on to the Chamber of Representatives, an important part of the committee's work consists in examining these bills. Between 2003 and 2007, not less than 217 treaties were adopted.
