= 18th Logistics Battalion (Belgium) =

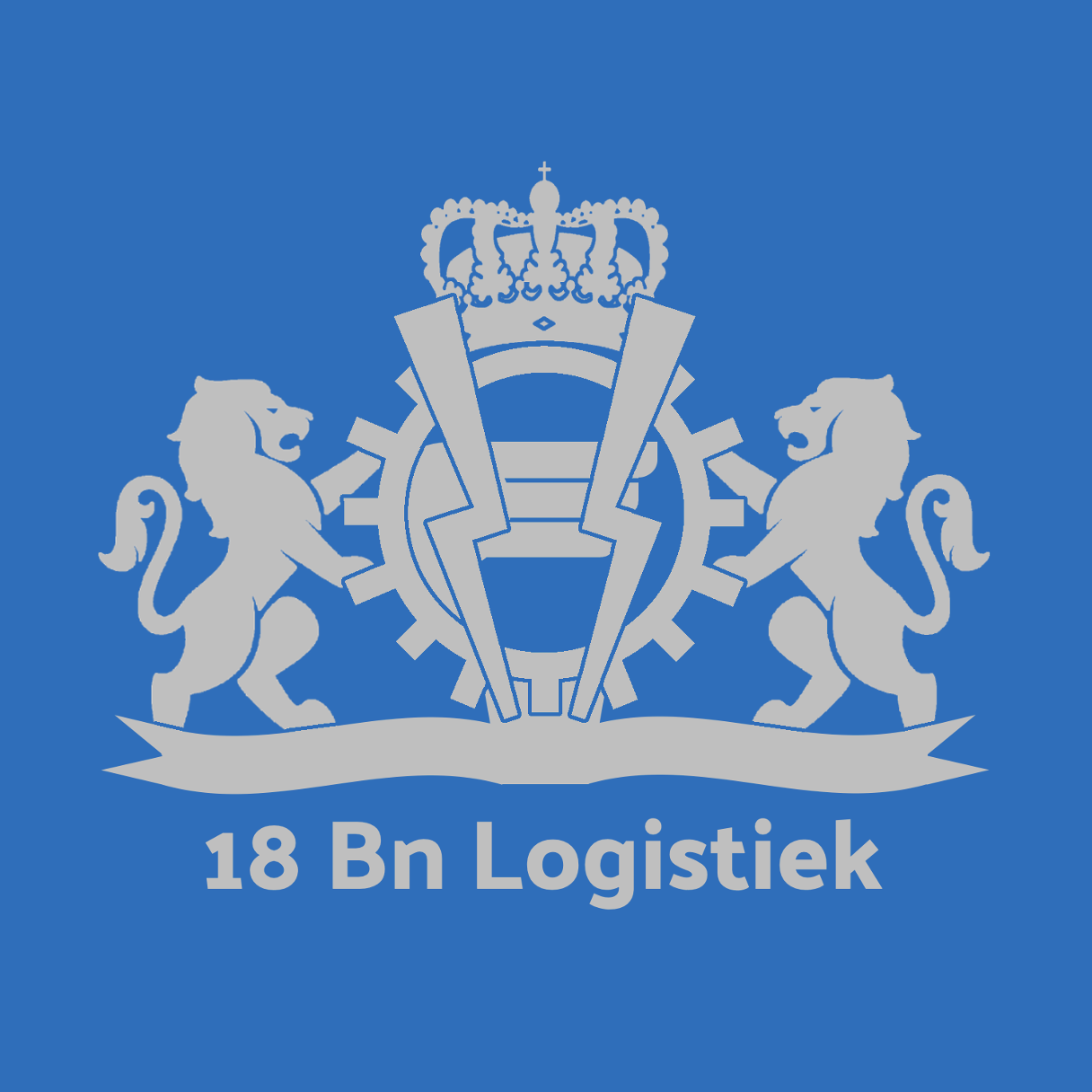
- Country: Belgium
- Branch: Belgian Army
- Type: Logistics
- Part of: Motorized Brigade
- Garrison/HQ: Leopoldsburg

The 18th Logistics Battalion (Dutch: 18 Bataljon Logistiek) is a logistics battalion in the Belgian Army of the Belgian Armed Forces.

== History ==
The Battalion was established before 1965 and was based in Leopoldsburg. In 1972, Halle became the battalion's partner city, and Halle's sister city was Werl (West Germany). Because of this partnership, the battalion was stationed in Werl. They remained there until 27 September 1994.

== Subdivision ==
The Battalion is divided into six companies:

- Staff and Services Company: this is the nerve centre of the Battalion.
- 1st Equipment Company: this company is responsible for the maintenance and repair of vehicles and weapons.
- Supply and Transport Company: this company is responsible for supplying and transporting equipment.
- 1st Mess Company: this company ensures that all personnel stationed in Leopoldsburg are provided with food.
- 95th Company in Lombardsijde
- 202nd Company in Heverlee: this company is still in its start-up phase.

== Assignments ==
The 18th Logistics Battalion is responsible for supplying all units of the Belgian Army with food, fuel, ammunition, equipment and spare parts.
