= Meteorological Wing =

- Active: 1947
- Country: Belgium
- Branch: Belgian Air Force
- Garrison/HQ: Beauvechain

Commanders
- Current commander: Lieutenant Colonel Jos Leten (20.11.2014 - )

The Meteorological Wing (Dutch: Meteorologische Wing, French: Wing Météorologique) is a wing in the Belgian Air Force of the Belgian Armed Forces. It is responsible for providing meteorological information and training.

== Organisation ==
The Meteorological Wing is organised into three groups:

- the management
- the Exploitation Group Meteo, an operational group consisting of a military weather forecasting centre, meteorological antennae spread across the Belgian territory, a school squadron and a meteo applications squadron.
- the Support Group Meteo, a support group consisting of a technical and logistical squadron and an ICT squadron.
