= Leopoldsburg War Cemetery =

Commonwealth military cemetery in Belgium

- Commonwealth War Graves Commission
- For World War II
- Established: 1946
- Location: 51°6′45″N 5°16′6″E near Leopoldsburg, Limburg, Belgium
- Total burials: 800
- Unknowns: 17

Burials by nation
- United Kingdom: 709 Canada: 31; Poland: 27; Australia: 8 Netherlands: 4 New Zealand: 3 South Africa: 1

Burials by war
- World War II

The Leopoldsburg War Cemetery is a Second World War military cemetery of Commonwealth servicemen located in Leopoldsburg, in the province of Limburg, Belgium. The cemetery is maintained by the Commonwealth War Graves Commission (CWGC).

The cemetery contains 800 burials of the Second World War, of which 783 are identified and 17 are unidentified. The majority of those buried died during the liberation of Belgium and the subsequent Allied advance into the Netherlands and Germany in 1944–45.

== See also ==
- Commonwealth War Graves Commission
