= Motorized Brigade (Belgium) =

Military unit of the Belgian Army

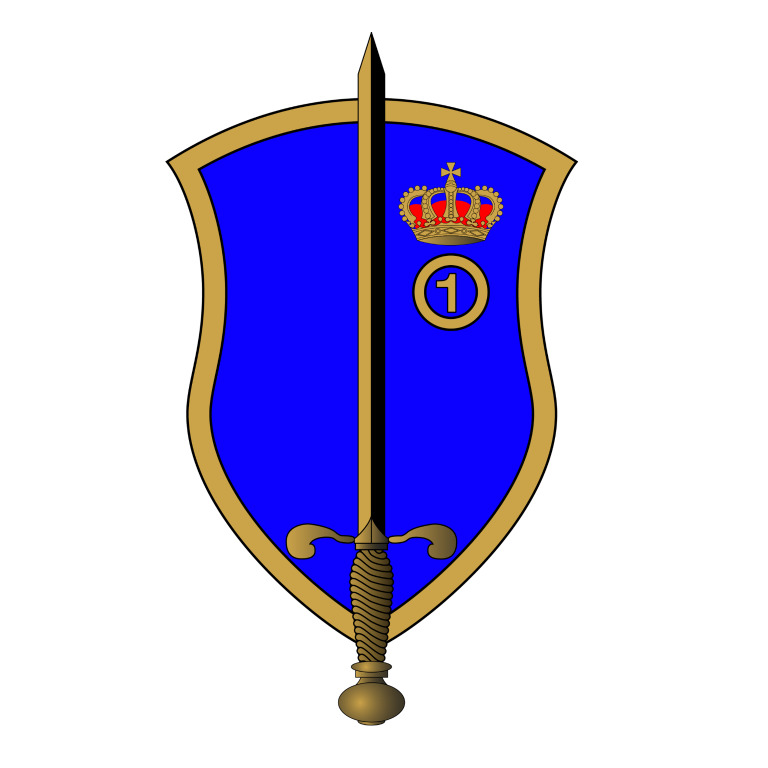
- Active: 22 November 2018–3 February 2026
- Country: Belgium
- Branch: Belgian Army
- Size: 7,500
- Motto: Together Strong

Commanders
- Colonel: Jean-Louis Crucifix (2018-2019)
- Colonel: Jacky Cabo (2019-2021)
- Colonel: Lieven Geeraert (2021-2023)
- Colonel: Claudio Madile (2023-present)

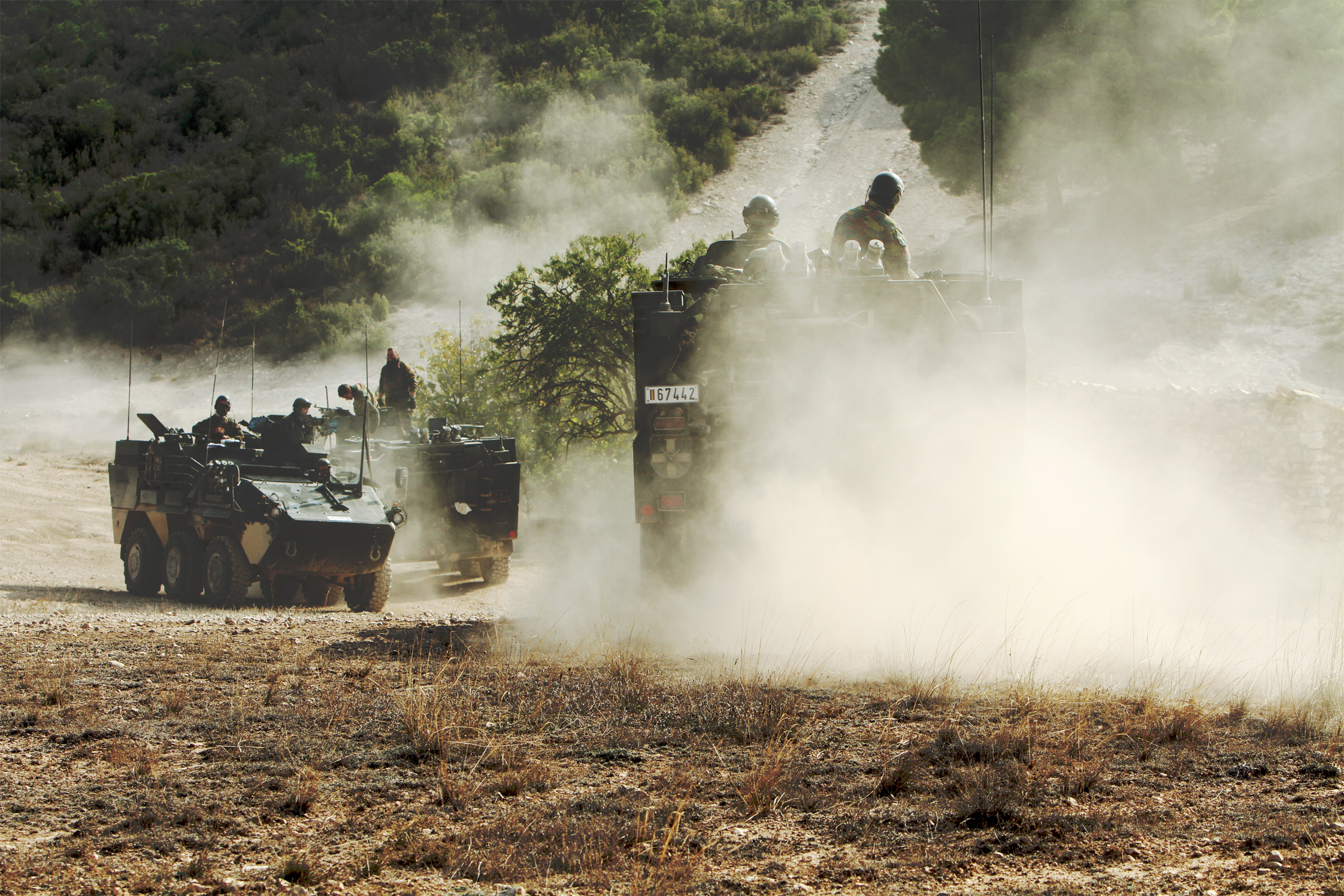
Reconnaissance troops from the motorised brigade during an exercise.

The Motorised Brigade (Dutch: De Gemotoriseerde Brigade, French: Brigade Motorisée) was a brigade of the Army of the Belgian Armed Forces.

The unit was established on 22 November 2018 as the successor of the Medium Brigade.

On 3 February 2026 the Motorized Brigade was split into the 1st Brigade and the 7th Brigade. The 1st Brigade contains the Dutch-speaking units and the bilingual Jagers te Paard Battalion. The 7th Brigade contains the French-speaking units.

The headquarters was located in Leopoldsburg and Marche-en-Famenne.

== Structure ==
Motorised Brigade key locations
- Motorised Brigade, in Leopoldsburg
  - Headquarters and Staff Company, carrying the traditions of the 8th/9th Regiment of the Line, in Leopoldsburg
- Combat units:
  - 1/3rd Lancers Battalion, in Marche-en-Famenne with Piranha IIIC and ATF Dingo 2 wheeled, armoured vehicles (to be replaced by VBMR Griffons)
  - Battalion Carabiniers "Prins Boudewijn" - Grenadiers, in Leopoldsburg with Piranha IIIC and ATF Dingo 2 wheeled, armoured vehicles (to be replaced by VBMR Griffons)
  - Battalion "Bevrijding" - 5th of the Line, in Leopoldsburg with Piranha IIIC and ATF Dingo 2 wheeled, armoured vehicles (to be replaced by VBMR Griffons)
  - Battalion "Chasseurs Ardennais", in Marche-en-Famenne with Piranha IIIC and ATF Dingo 2 wheeled, armoured vehicles (to be replaced by VBMR Griffons)
  - Battalion 12th of the Line "Prince Léopold" - 13th of the Line, in Spa (Light infantry)
- Combat support units:
  - Artillery Battalion, in Brasschaat
    - Mortar Battery, with 120 mm mortars
    - Howitzer Battery, with LG1 105 mm howitzers
  - 4th Engineer Battalion, in Amay
  - 11th Engineer Battalion, in Zwijndrecht
  - Jagers te Paard Battalion (ISTAR), in Heverlee with Pandur I reconnaissance vehicles.
- Combat service support units:
  - 4th Communication and Information Systems Group, in Marche-en-Famenne
  - 10th Communication and Information Systems Group, in Leopoldsburg
  - 4th Logistics Battalion, in Marche-en-Famenne
  - 18th Logistics Battalion, in Leopoldsburg
- Training units:
  - Training Camp Beverlo, near Leopoldsburg
  - Training Camp Marche, near Marche-en-Famenne
