= 29th Logistics Battalion (Belgium) =

- Active: January 1, 1971
- Country: Belgium
- Branch: Belgian Army
- Type: Logistics
- Garrison/HQ: Grobbendonk
- Motto: Vis Unita Fortior(United Strength is Stronger)

The 29th Logistics Battalion (Dutch: 29 Bataljon Logistiek) is a logistics battalion in the Belgian Army of the Belgian Armed Forces. tasked with the storage and distribution of ammunition, fuel, Stores and providing maintenance and disposal services for the Belgian Armed Forces. Its command headquarters was located in Tounai from 1995 to 2002, before moving to its current garrison in Grobbendonk.

== Organisation ==
29th Logistics Battalion comprises:

- HQ staff
- 10 Fuel and Heavy Transport company
- 101 Supply and Service company
- 230 Equipment company
- 260 Ammunition company
