= 8th Logistics Battalion (Belgium) =

- 8th Transmission Battalion
- Active: ? - 22 Dec 2010; 2026 - present
- Country: Belgium
- Branch: Belgian Army
- Type: Logistics
- Garrison/HQ: Namur

The 8th Logistics Battalion (French: 8 Bataillon Logistique) was a logistics battalion of the Belgian Army. Originally based in Tournai the battalion moved to Belgrade in Namur in 2002. In 2009 the battalion deployed to Afghanistan.

On 22 December 2010, the battalion and its companies were disbanded. In 2024 it was announced that the battalion would be reformed and based in Charleroi, where the Belgian Defence Ministry is building a new base for the battalion and the 1^{er}/3^{e} Lanciers currently stationed in Marche-en-Famenne.
