= 11th Engineer Battalion (Belgium) =

- Active: 1948 Creation
- Country: Belgium
- Branch: Belgian Army
- Type: Engineer
- Part of: Motorized Brigade
- Garrison/HQ: Zwijndrecht, Belgium
- Mottos: Per ignem et aquam (Through fire and water)

The 11th Engineer Battalion (Dutch: 11 Bataljon Genie) is an engineer battalion in the Motorized Brigade of the Belgian Armed Forces. The soldiers of the 11th Engineer Battalion have diverse combat capabilities, specialized in underwater missions and reconnaissance for amphibious warfare operations. Some soldiers of the battalion are also trained as the members of the Para-Commando Brigade and can be employed to support the 2nd Commando and 3rd Paratrooper battalions of Special Operations Regiment.

== Organisation ==
The 11th Engineer Battalion includes:

- HQ staff
- construction company
- light combat engineers company
- combat engineers company
- service company

Note: Unlike the 4th Engineer Battalion, it does not have a CBRN company (Chemical, biological, radiological, and nuclear defense).

== Deployments ==
The 11th Engineer Battalion has deployed to Estonia in 2019 and to Lithuania and Romania in 2025. It deployed to assist civilian authorities during the 2021 European floods.
