= Bataljon Carabiniers Prins Boudewijn–Grenadiers =

Carabiniers Prins Boudewijn - Grenadiers Battalion
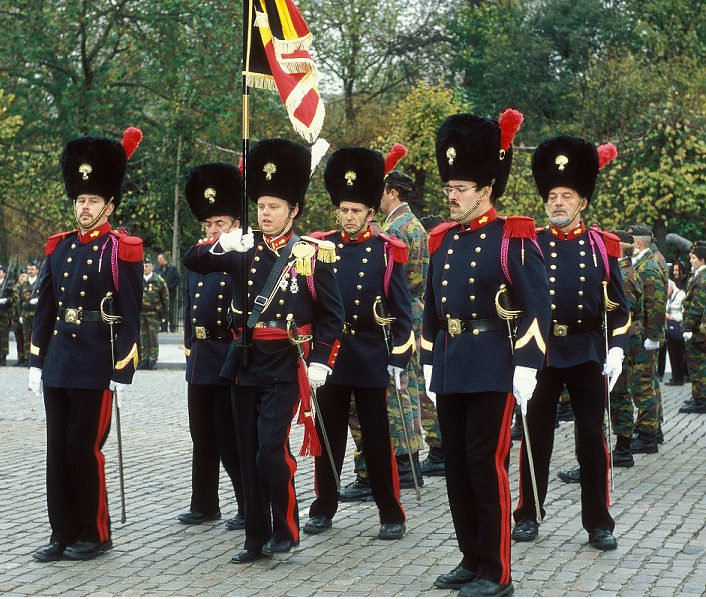
- Ceremonial uniform with bearskins. Grenadier full dress as worn until 1914 and now retained as tenue tradition.
- Active: 27 June 1992
- Country: Belgium
- Branch: Belgian Army
- Type: Infantry
- Role: motorized infantry
- Part of: Motorized Brigade
- Garrison/HQ: Lombardsijde
- Mottos: Parvi sed Magni (small but great) and eens Grenadier steeds Grenadier (once a Grenadier always a Grenadier)
- Battle honours: Veldtocht 1914 - 1918; Antwerpen; IJzer; Tervate; Steenstraat; Westrozebeke; Passendale; Rumbeke; Slag van Belgie 1940

The Bataljon Carabiniers Prins Boudewijn–Grenadiers is an infantry battalion in the Belgian Army of the Belgian Armed Forces. It is a part of the Motorized Brigade and is a Dutch-speaking unit.

== History ==
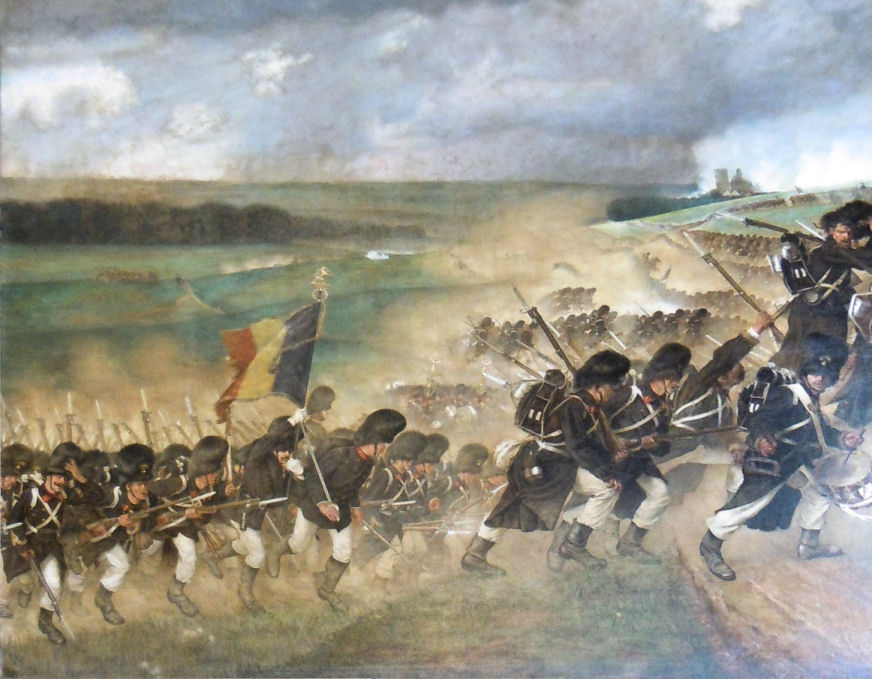
the Attack of Scherpenheuvel (peacetime maneuvers 1894) by Edwin Ganz. Collection of the Regiment Grenadiers-Caserne Prince Albert

=== Carabiniers ===
The 1st Rifles Regiment was formed on 27 September 1830 during the Belgian Revolution. They were equipped with carbines and received the title of Regiment of Carabiniers in 1850. On 21 July 1930 King Albert I decided that the regiment would bear the title of Regiment Carabiniers Prince Baudouin, in honour of his late brother (not to be confused with the king of the same name) who served within its ranks.

=== Grenadier Regiment ===
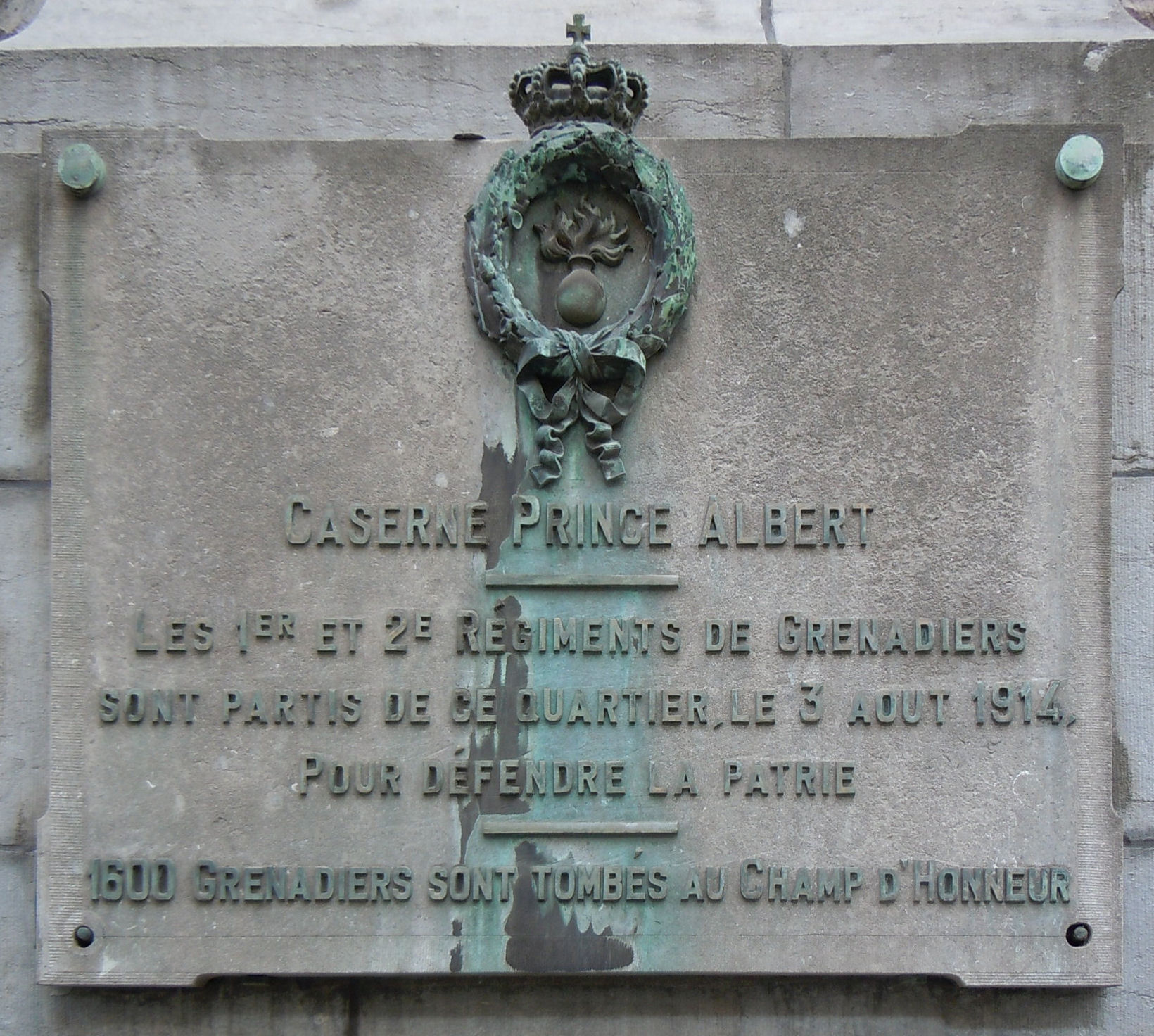
Monument to the 1,600 Belgian grenadiers killed in action during World War I

The Grenadier Regiment was founded on 8 May 1837 by King Leopold I. Originally designated as the Regiment of Grenadiers and Voltigeurs, it was created by bringing together the elite companies of each of the twelve regiments of line infantry then in existence. The new unit consisted of four battalions; two of grenadiers and two of voltigeurs. Renamed as the Elite Regiment a year later the unit finally received the designation of Grenadier Regiment by royal command on 5 March 1850.

The new regiment was stationed in the Caserne Prince Albert, in Brussels near the Royal Palace. Today only the monument to the fallen Grenadiers remains of it. In the Hall of Grenadiers the memorabilia and the portraits of the Royal Officers are still kept.

=== Carabiniers Prins Boudewijn – Grenadiers ===
As a result of cuts to the army after the Cold War, the Regiment Carabiniers Prins Boudewijn was amalgamated with the 1st Grenadier Regiment on 27 June 1992 in order to form the new Regiment Carabiniers Prins Boudewijn – Grenadiers. The unit retained its role of mechanised infantry and was stationed in Leopoldsburg. They take part in missions abroad and still have important ceremonial duties. In 2025 the unit moved to Lombardsijde.

Today there are approximately 600 Grenadiers of whom 6 are women.

=== Royal officers ===
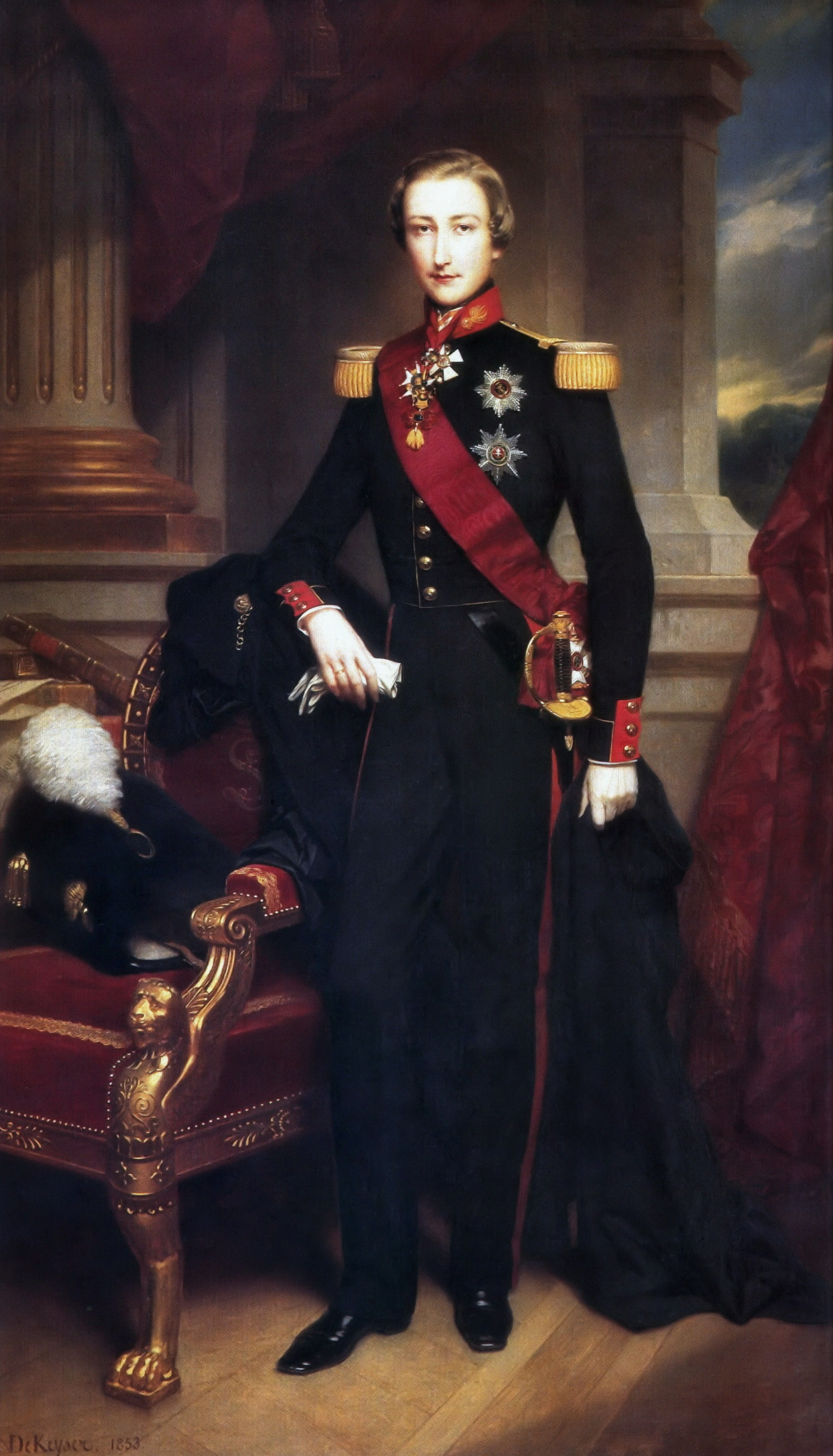
The Duke of Brabant, Leopold II as Grenadier wearing a bearskin.

Historically, the regiment had the distinction of having members of the royal family and nobility within its ranks, including:

- King Leopold II
- Prince Baudouin
- King Albert I
- King Leopold III

Today Prince Amedeo of Belgium, Archduke of Austria-Este is officer of the Second Regiment of Grenadiers. Other important officers included Francis Dhanis .

=== Battle honours ===
The following honours are displayed on the regiment's standard, they are embroidered in gold on the Belgian Colours. The current Standard was presented to the Regiment by King Albert II in 1994:

- Campaign 1914-1918
- Antwerpen
- IJzer
- Tervaete
- Steenstraete
- Westrozebeke
- Passendale
- Rumbeke
- Battle of Belgium 1940

== Ceremonial duties ==
The regiment provides the Guard of Honour at the following ceremonies:

- the Annual Service for Prince Baudouin, Church of Laeken,
- the Annual Service at the Royal Palace, presentation of the Kings Colours, 15 November,
- 11 November Armistice Day.

The grenadiers/carabiniers also provided Guards of Honour at the following occasions:

- Wedding of the Duke of Brabant (1999),
- State Funeral of Prince Boudouin,
- State Funerals of Queen Elisabeth and Queen Astrid,
- State Funeral of King Leopold III,
- Solemn and Royal Funeral of Queen Fabiola (2014).

== Organisation ==
Carabiniers Prins Boudewijn – Grenadiers Battalion comprises:

- HQ staff
- 1st Company
- 2nd Company
- 3rd Company
- service Company

== Lineage ==
Lineage
1st Regiment of Carabiniers	Regiment of Carabiniers	Regiment Karabiniers Prins Boudewijn	Regiment Carabiniers Prins Boudewijn – Grenadiers
1st Regiment of Grenadiers			Regiment Carabiniers Prins Boudewijn – Grenadiers

== Sources ==
- "Regiment Carabiniers Prins Boudewijn - Grenadiers" (in Dutch). Defence Belgium.
- "Regiment Carabiniers Prins Boudewijn - Grenadiers" (in French). Defence Belgium.
