= Belgian Cyber Force =

Branch of the Belgian Armed Forces

- Cybermacht (Dutch); Force cyber (French)
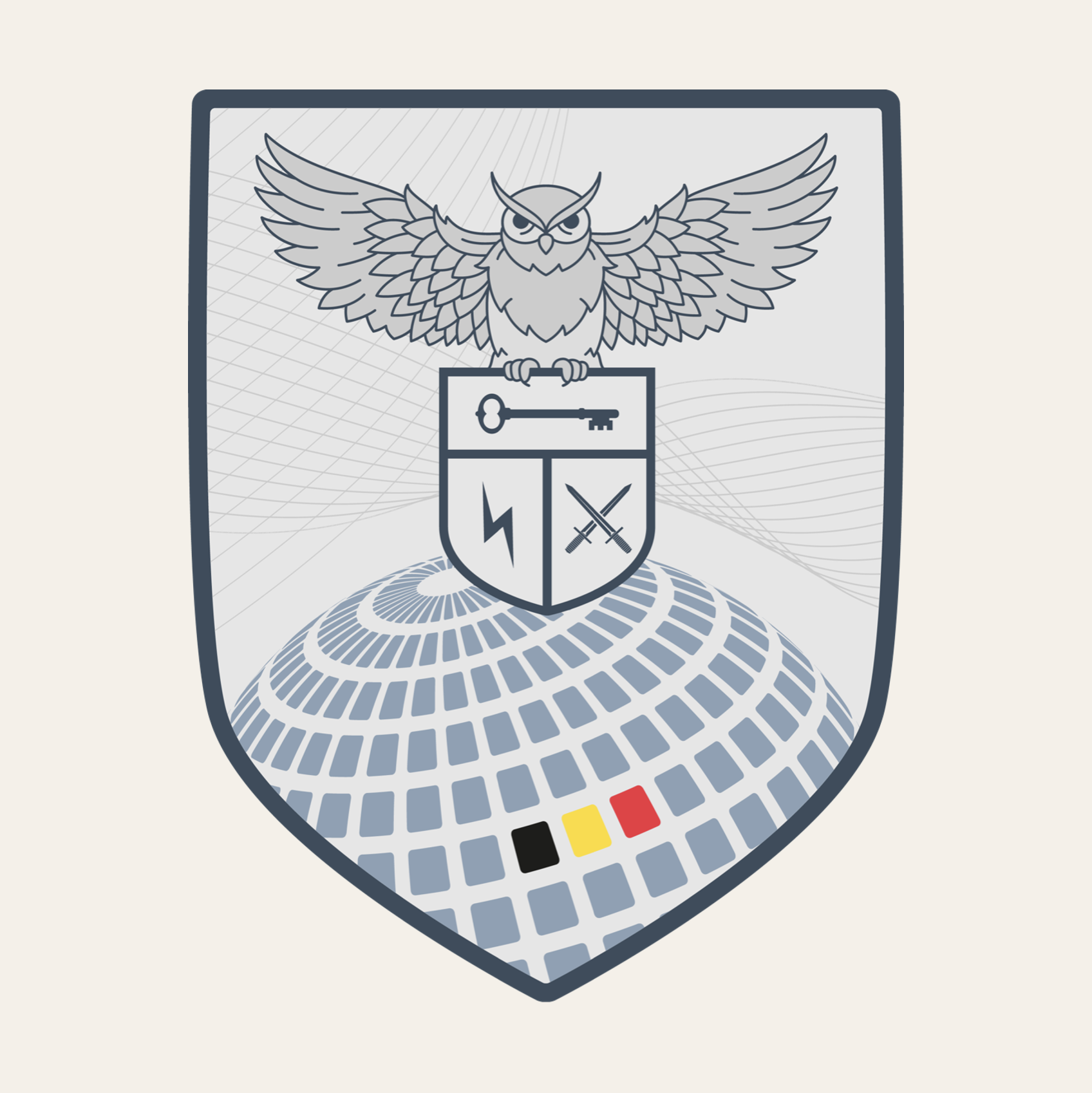
- Insignia of the Belgian Cyber Force
- Active: 19 October 2022–present
- Country: Belgium
- Allegiance: King of the Belgians
- Part of: Belgian Armed Forces

Commanders
- Commander: General-major Pierre Ciparisse

The Belgian Cyber Force (Dutch: Cybermacht, French: Force cyber) is one of the five branches of the Belgian Armed Forces. It was created in 2022 under the name of Cyber Command, at the suggestion of Admiral Michel Hofman. The branch received its current name on 21 July 2025.

The primary mission of the branch is to secure the cyber space used by the rest of the armed forces and also to gather information and conduct operations. As of February 2026, the personnel of the branch was 32% civilian. As Cyber Command, the branch was commanded by Major General Michel Van Strythem.
