= 4th Logistics Battalion =

- Country: Belgium
- Branch: Belgian Army
- Type: Logistics
- Part of: Motorized Brigade
- Garrison/HQ: Marche-en-Famenne

The 4th Logistics Battalion (French: 4 Bataillon Logistique) is a logistics battalion in the Belgian Army of the Belgian Armed Forces.

The battalion has played a role in NATO Enhanced Forward Presence in Lithuania.

In May 2020, during the COVID-19 epidemic in Belgium, the battalion was deployed to stock and distribute medical supplies, including personal protective equipment.
