= Artillery Battalion (Belgium) =

- Active: 2010 – present
- Country: Belgium
- Branch: Belgian Army
- Type: Artillery
- Size: 450 soldiers (as of 2019)
- Part of: Motorized Brigade.
- Garrison/HQ: Brasschaat, Belgium
- Motto: Regis ultima ratio ("The King's last argument")
- Mascot: Goat -Modest XI
- Equipment: 120 RT Mortar, LG1 Mark II Howitzer

The Artillery Battalion (Dutch: Bataljon Artillerie) is the only artillery battalion in the Motorized Brigade of the Belgian Armed Forces.

It was created in 2010 by merging all artillery units that remained in the Belgian military. It upholds the traditions of the disbanded 2nd Field Artillery Regiment. The battalion is based in Brasschaat and consists of a Mortar battery, operating 120mm mortars and a howitzer battery, operating 14 LG1 105 mm (4.1 in) howitzers. A third battery, which operated Mistral surface-to-air missiles and based in Lombardsijde, was disbanded without replacement on 31 December 2017.

On 23 December 2018 it came under command and provides fire support to the Motorized Brigade. The battalion supports the other motorized brigade units with observations (employing forward air controllers) and artillery fire. In total, it consists of more than 450 soldiers. 10% of the battalion soldiers are also trained Paracommando and can be employed to support the 2nd Commando and 3rd Paratrooper battalions of Special Operations Regiment. In the near future a battery of long range 155mm artillery is to be created. It was also announced in 2020 that a battery of air-defense artillery was to be reactivated before 2030.

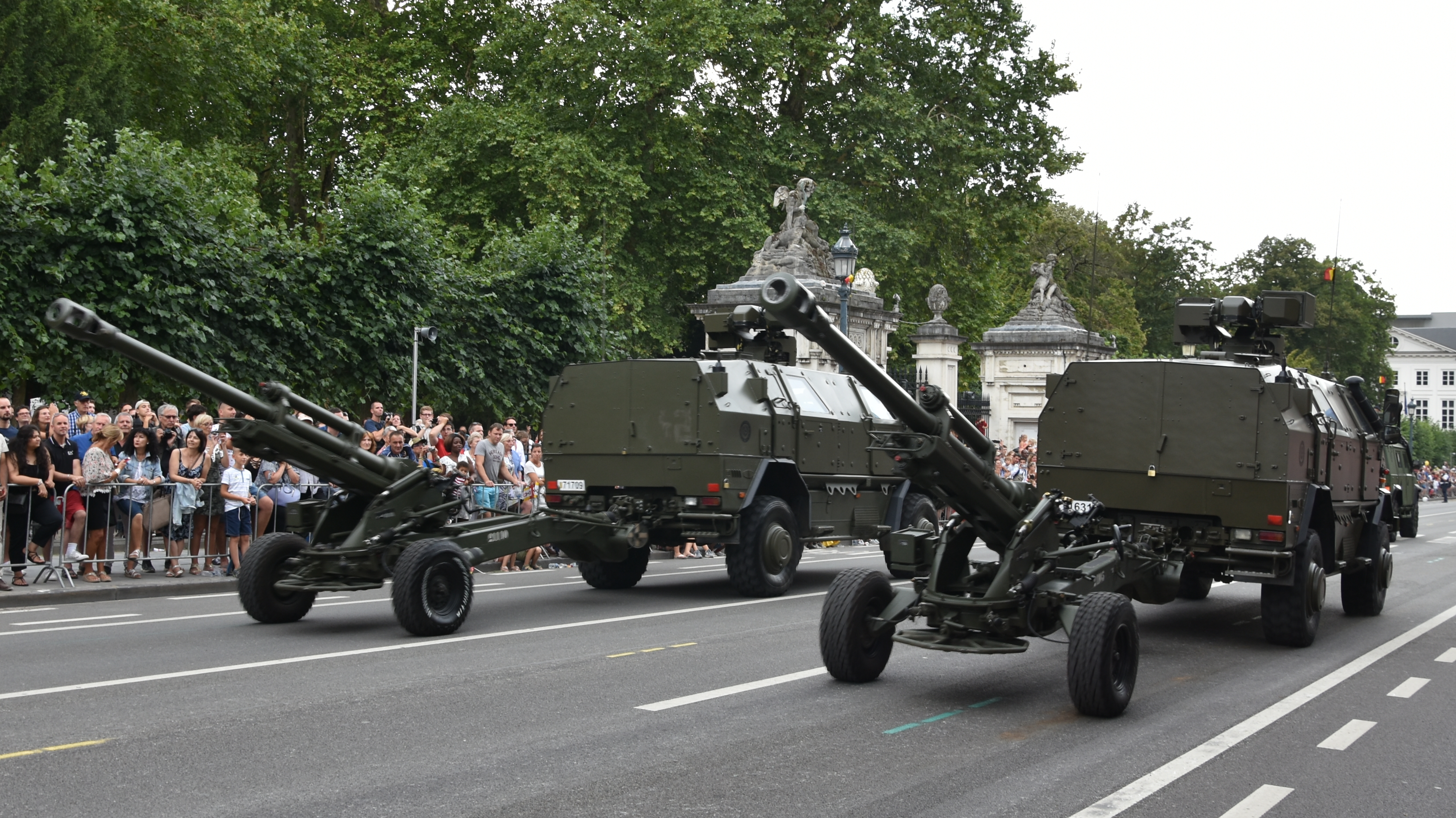
105 mm (4.1 in) howitzers of the Artillery Battalion

Soldiers of the Belgian Artillery Battalion loading a 105mm LG1 during Trident Juncture 2018.

== Organisation ==
The Artillery Battalion comprises:

- HQ staff
- Joint Fires Observer (Land Air Integration) Battery
- Mortar Battery
- Howitzer Battery
- Service Battery
