= Belgian Army =

- Landmacht (Dutch); Force Terrestre (French)
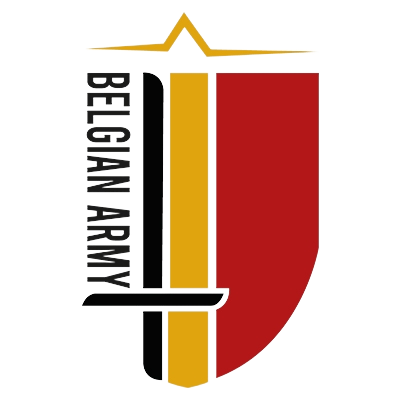
- Founded: 1830; 196 years ago
- Country: Belgium
- Type: Army
- Role: Land warfare
- Size: 9,427 active personnel 2,120 reservists
- Part of: Belgian Armed Forces

Commanders
- Commander: Major-General Jean-Pol Baugnée

Insignia
- Identification symbol

The Belgian Army (Dutch: Landmacht, French: Force Terrestre) is the land branch of the Belgian Armed Forces. The King of the Belgians is the commander in chief. The current chief of staff of the Belgian Army is Major-General Jean-Pol Baugnée.

Dating back to Belgium's establishment in 1830, the Belgian Army is the oldest service branch of the Belgian Armed Forces, and is also the largest of the four branches, with approximately 10,000 active military personnel and over 2,000 reservists as of 2022.

The 1st Fusilier Battalion is the most recently created unit of the Belgian Army.

== History ==
=== Early history ===
The Belgian Army was established in 1830 after Belgium gained independence from the Netherlands after the Belgian Revolution. It was initially expected that as neutral buffer state with borders guaranteed by France, Britain, and Prussia, Belgium could avoid the need for an expensive permanent military, relying instead on the part-time militia of the existing Garde Civique (Civil Guard); however, the need of a regular full-time army was soon acknowledged, and the Belgian Army was promptly established.

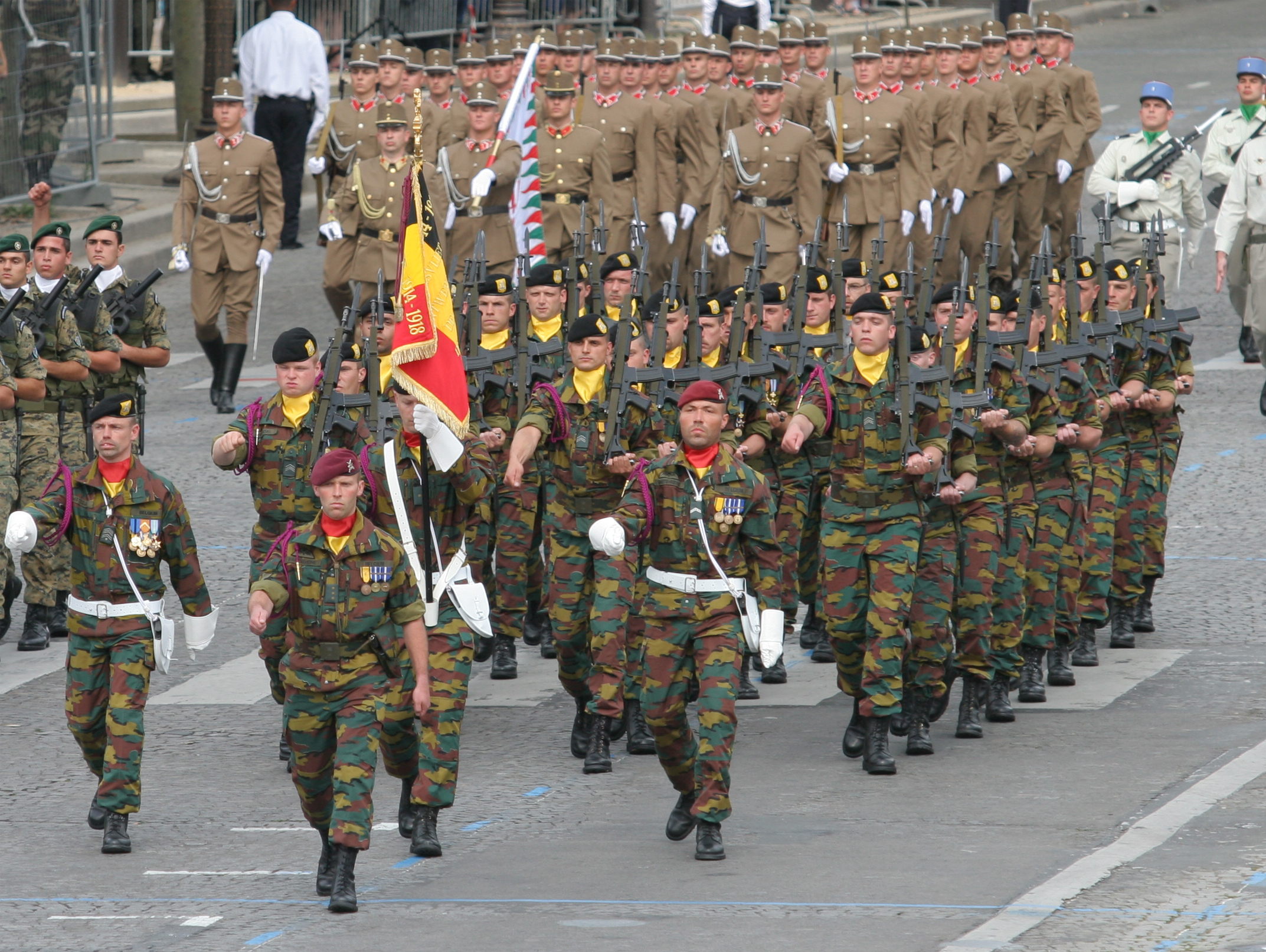
A detachment of the 2nd/4th Regiment Mounted Rifles at the 2007 Bastille Day Military Parade

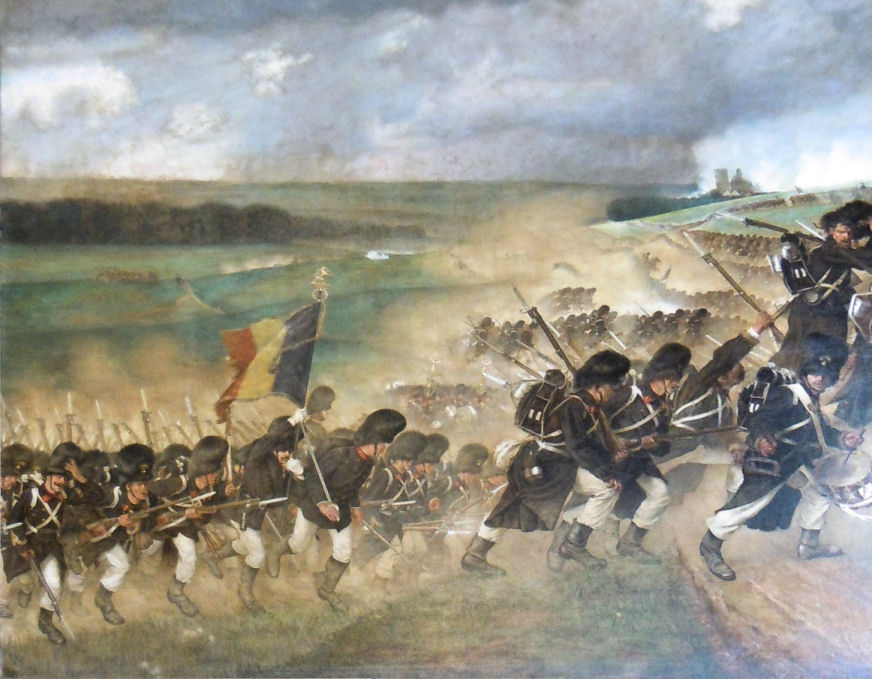
A regiment of grenadiers on maneuvers in 1894

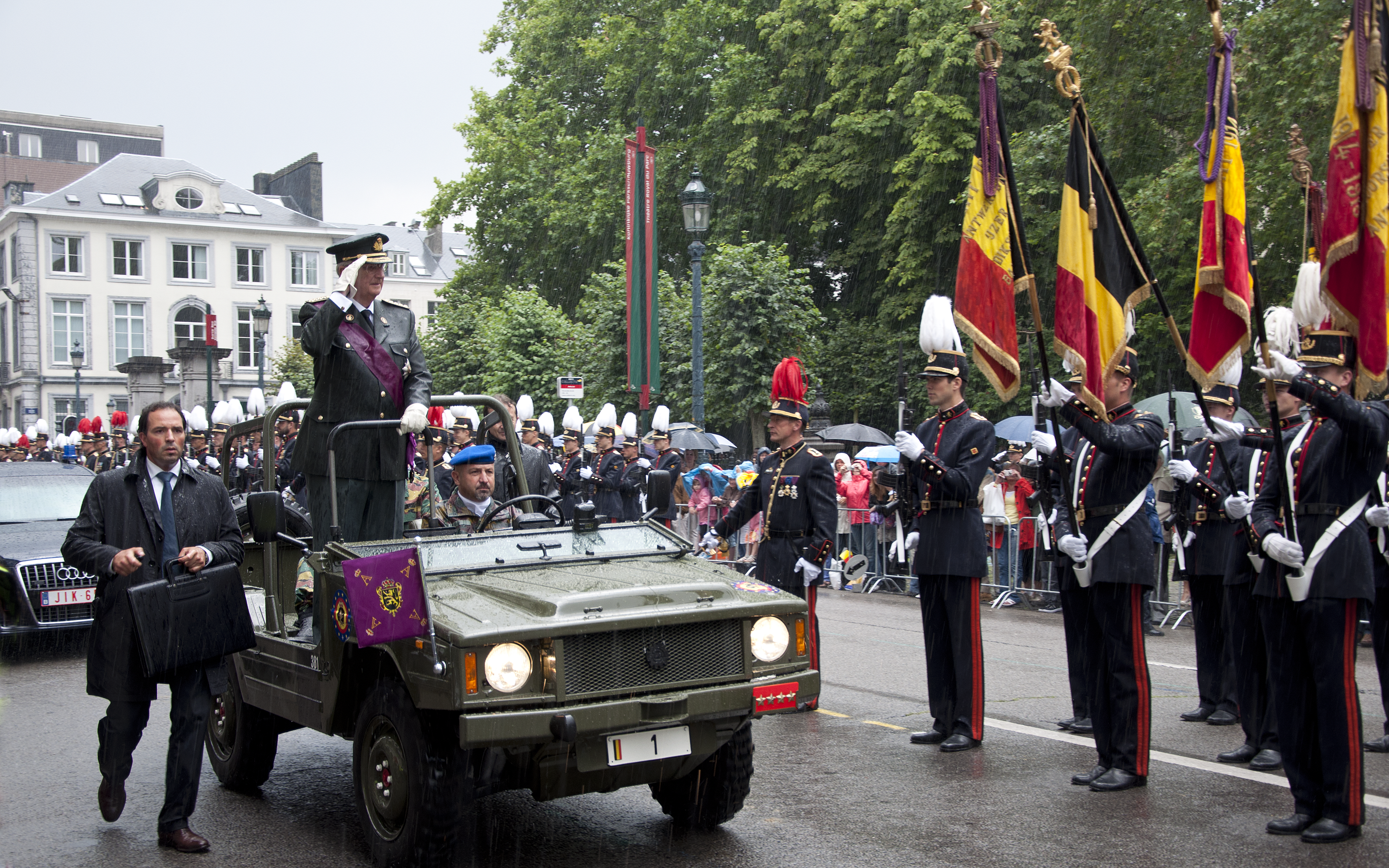
King Albert II with members of the armed forces

According to the Law of August 1837, the Belgian Army was to consist of:

==== Infantry ====
- 14 line infantry regiments (3 active battalions, 1 reserve battalion and 1 company at each regiment's depot)
- 3 Jäger regiments (3 active battalions, 1 reserve battalion and 1 company at each regiment's depot)
- 1 grenadier regiment (3 active battalions, 1 reserve battalion and 1 company the regiment's depot)
- 1 carabinier regiment (4 active battalions, 2 reserve battalions and 1 company the regiment's depot))
- 2 companies settled
- 1 disciplinary body
- 1 military school for the children of servicemen

Note: A battalion (864 men) consisted of four companies of 216 men

==== Cavalry ====
- 4 lancer regiments (4 active squadrons and one reinforcement squadron in each regiment)
- 4 guides regiments (4 active squadrons and one reinforcement squadron in each regiment)
- 2 chasseur regiments (4 active squadrons and one reinforcement squadron in each regiment)

Note: A squadron had approximately 130 horses

==== Artillery ====
- 4 regiments of artillery (10 batteries in each regiment)
- 3 regiments of fortress artillery or siege artillery (16 batteries, 1 battery and 1 spare battery at each regiment's depot)
- 1 pontoon company
- 1 company of artificers
- 1 company of gunsmiths
- 1 company of artillery workers

Note: A battery had 6 guns

==== Engineering ====
- 1 Engineer Regiment (3 active battalions and one depot battalion)
- 1 railway company
- 1 field telegraph company
- 1 telegraph company
- 1 pontoon room company
- 1 workers company

==== Train ====
- 7 train companies

=== First World War ===
A major reorganisation of the army had been authorised by the government in 1912, providing for a total army of 350,000 men by 1926: 150,000 in the field forces, 130,000 in fortress garrisons and 70,000 reserves and auxiliaries. At the outbreak of war this reorganisation was nowhere near complete and only 117,000 men could be mobilised for the field forces, with the other branches equally deficient.

The Commander-in-Chief was King Albert I, with Lieutenant-General Chevalier Antonin de Selliers de Moranville as the Chief of the General Staff from 25 May 1914 until 6 September 1914 when a Royal Decree abolished the function of Chief of Staff of the army. In this way the King secured his control of the command.

- 1st Division (Lieutenant-General Baix) – around Ghent.
- 2nd Division (Lieutenant-General Dossin) – Antwerp.
- 3rd Division (Lieutenant-General Leman) – around Liège.
- 4th Division (Lieutenant-General Michel) – Namur and Charleroi.
- 5th Division (Lieutenant-General Ruwet) – around Mons.
- 6th Division (Lieutenant-General Lantonnois van Rode) – Brussels.
- Cavalry Division (Lieutenant-General de Witte) – Brussels.

In addition, there were garrisons at Antwerp, Liège and Namur, each placed under the command of the local divisional commander.

Each division contained three mixed brigades (of two infantry regiments and one artillery regiment), one cavalry regiment, and one artillery regiment, as well as various support units. Each infantry regiment contained three battalions, with one regiment in each brigade having a machine-gun company of six guns. An artillery regiment had three batteries of four guns.

The nominal strength of a division varied from 25,500 to 32,000 all ranks, with a total strength of eighteen infantry battalions, a cavalry regiment, eighteen machine-guns, and forty-eight guns. Two divisions (the 2nd and 6th) each had an additional artillery regiment, for a total of sixty guns.

The Cavalry Division had two brigades of two regiments each, three horse artillery batteries, and a cyclist battalion, along with support units; it had a total strength of 4,500 all ranks with 12 guns, and was, in effect, little more than a reinforced brigade.

=== Second World War ===
In 1940, the King of Belgium was the commander in chief of the Belgian Army which had a mobilised strength of 610,000 troops. The army was composed of seven infantry corps and one cavalry corps. The corps were as follows:

- I Corps with the 4th and 7th Infantry Divisions
- II Corps with the 6th and 9th Infantry Divisions
- III Corps with the 2nd and 3rd Infantry Divisions
- IV Corps with the 12th, 15th, and 18th Infantry Divisions
- V Corps with the 13th and 17th Infantry Divisions
- VI Corps with the 5th and 10th Infantry Divisions
- VII Corps with the 2nd Chasseurs Ardennais Division and 8th Infantry Division
- Cavalry Corps with the 2nd Cavalry Division and 1st and 14th Infantry Divisions
- Groupement Keyaerts with the 1st Chasseurs Ardennais Division and 1st Cavalry Division
- Army Reserve with the 11th and 16th Infantry Division

Each army corps had its own headquarters staff, medical and logistic support units, engineers and signal troops and corps-level artillery support.

Each infantry division had a divisional staff, reconnaissance unit, medical and logistic support units, engineers and signal troops. Active and first tier reserve divisions had two additional antitank companies. Infantry regiments numbered approximately 3,000 troops. Each active and first tier reserve regiment had 108 light machine guns, 52 heavy machine guns, 8 mortars and 12 antitank guns.

Within the Free Belgian Forces that were formed in Great Britain during the occupation of Belgium between 1940 and 1945, there was a land force formation, the 1st Belgian Infantry Brigade. An additional three divisions were raised and trained in Northern Ireland, but the war ended before they could see action. However, they joined the initial Belgian occupation force in Germany, I Belgian Corps, whose headquarters moved to Luedenscheid in October 1946. Of the 75,000 troops that found themselves in Germany on 8 May 1945, the vast majority had been recruited after the liberation of Belgium.

There was also a bicycle infantry formation known as the Frontier Cyclists.

=== Korean War ===
During the Korean War, Belgium provided combat troops for South Korea and became part of the United Nations Forces.

=== Cold War ===
During the Cold War, Belgium provided the I Belgian Corps (HQ Haelen Kaserne, Junkersdorf, Lindenthal (Cologne)), consisting of the 1st Infantry Division in Liège and 16th Mechanised Division in Neheim-Hüsten, to NATO's Northern Army Group for the defence of West Germany. There were also two reserve brigades (10th Mechanised Brigade, Limbourg, and the 12th Motorised Brigade, Liège), slightly bigger than the four active brigades, which were intended as reinforcements for the two divisions. Interior forces comprised the Para-Commando Regiment in Heverlee, three national defence light infantry battalions (5th Chasseurs Ardennais, 3rd Carabiniers-cyclists, and 4th Carabiniers-cyclists), four engineer battalions, and nine provincial regiments with two to five light infantry battalions each. (Isby and Kamps, 1985, 64, 72)

After the end of the Cold War, forces were reduced. Initial planning in 1991 called for a Belgian-led corps with 2 or 4 Belgian brigades, a German brigade, and possibly a U.S. brigade. However, by 1992 this plan was looking unlikely, and in 1993 a single Belgian division with two brigades became part of the Eurocorps.

== Organization ==
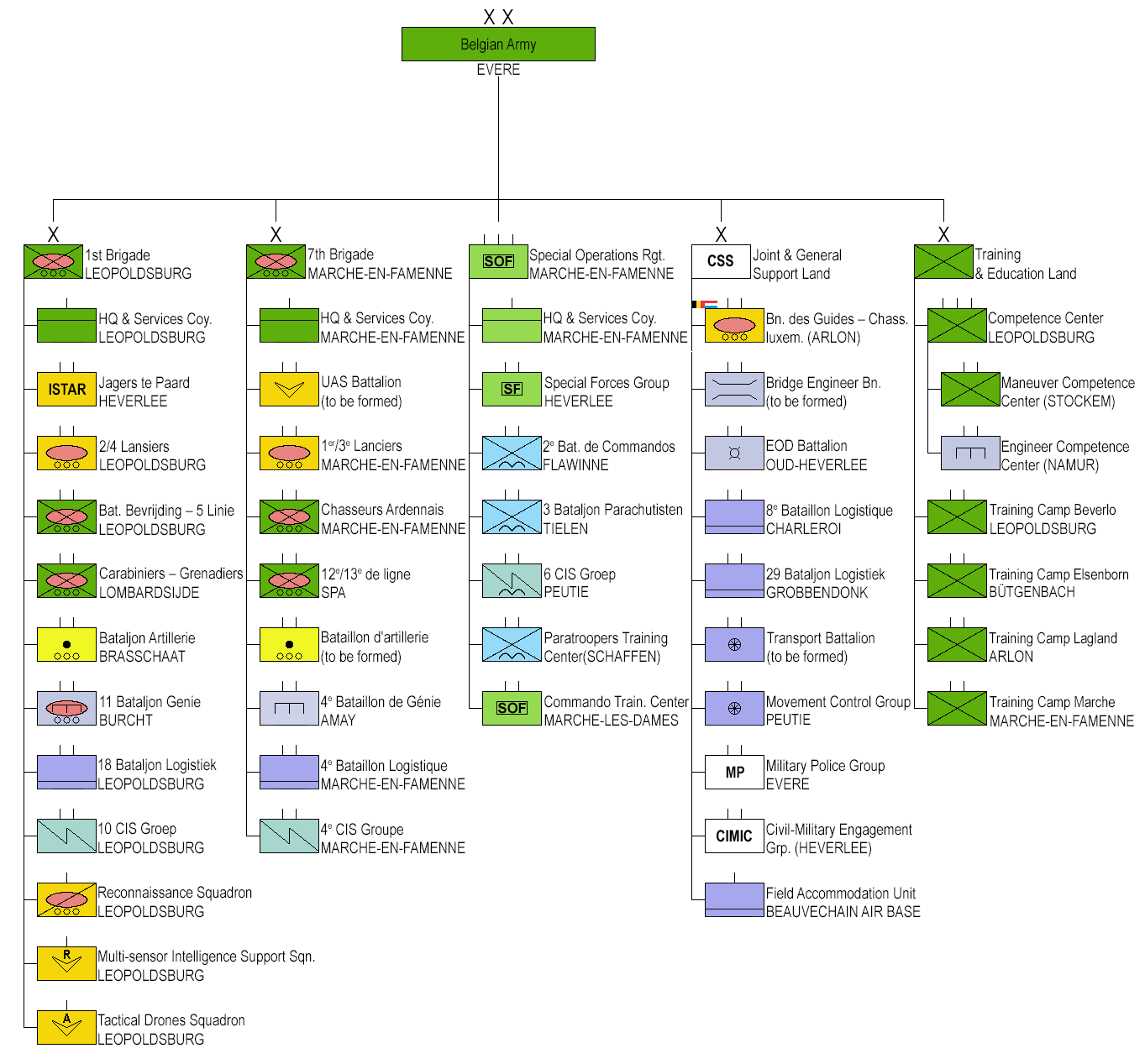
Belgian Army organization 2025–2028

Belgian Army – brigade locations

The Belgian Army is organised as 1st Brigade, 7th Brigade and 1st Special Operations Regiment. In total, the Belgian Army consists of almost 10,000 active military personnel. To enhance organizational efficiency, the Belgian Army reformed on 3 February 2026 a dedicated brigade for each of Belgium's major linguistic communities. The structure and composition of these brigades is as follows:

- 1st Brigade, in Leopoldsburg
  - Brigade Headquarters - 8/9e Linie, in Leopoldsburg
  - Jagers te Paard Battalion, in Heverlee — bilingual ISTAR (Intelligence, Surveillance, Target Acquisition, and Reconnaissance) unit
  - 2/4e Lansiers, in Leopoldsburg (reactivated on 2 September 2025)
  - Bataljon Bevrijding – 5e Linie, in Leopoldsburg
  - Carabiniers Prins Boudewijn – Grenadiers, in Lombardsijde
  - Artillery Battalion, in Brasschaat
  - 11th Engineer Battalion, in Burcht
  - 18th Logistic Battalion, in Leopoldsburg
  - 10th Communication and Information Systems (CIS) Group, in Leopoldsburg
- 7th Brigade, in Marche-en-Famenne
  - Brigade Headquarters - 2^{e} Chasseurs à Pied, in Marche-en-Famenne
  - Unmanned Aerial Systems Battalion, with loitering munitions and armed tactical drones (to be formed by 2028)
  - 1^{er}/3^{e} Lanciers, in Marche-en-Famenne
  - Chasseurs Ardennais, in Marche-en-Famenne
  - 12^{e}/13^{e} de ligne, in Spa
  - Artillery Battalion, in Marche-en-Famenne (to be formed by 2030)
  - 4th Engineer Battalion, in Amay
  - 4th Communication and Information Systems Group, in Marche-en-Famenne
  - 4th Logistic Battalion, in Marche-en-Famenne

Other units of the Belgian Army:

- Special Operations Regiment, in Heverlee
  - Special Forces Group, in Heverlee
  - 2nd Commando Battalion, in Flawinne
  - 3rd Paratroopers Battalion, in Tielen
  - 6th CIS Group, in Peutie
  - 210th Para-commando Logistics Company (to be reactivated)
- Training and Education Land
  - Infantry, Cavalry, and Engineering Training Centers
  - Training camps at Lombardsijde, Elsenborn, Lagland, Marche-en-Famenne, Leopoldsburg, and Brasschaat.
  - Training for Special Operations Forces at Marche-les-Dames and Schaffen, which fall under the SOR.
- Joint and General Support Land
  - Bataillon des Guides – Chasseurs luxembourgeois, in Arlon with personnel from Belgium and Luxembourg (being formed)
  - Bridge Engineer Battalion (to be formed)
  - Explosive Ordnance Disposal (EOD) Battalion
  - 8th Logistics Battalions
  - 29th Logistics Battalions
  - Transport Battalion (to be formed)
  - Movement Control Group
  - Military Police Group
  - Civil-Military Engagement Group
  - Field Accommodation Unit (FAU)

Some of the regiments in the Belgian Army, such as the 12/13th Battalion of the Line, have names consisting of multiple elements. This is the result of a series of amalgamations that took place over the years. The 12/13th Battalion was created in 1993 as a result of the merger of the 12th Regiment of the Line Prince Leopold and the 13th Regiment of the Line.

=== Ranks ===
==== Officer ranks ====
The rank insignia of commissioned officers.

NATO code	OF-10	OF-9	OF-8	OF-7	OF-6	OF-5	OF-4	OF-3		OF-2	OF-1
Belgian Land Component
Belgian Land Component		Generaal	Luitenant-generaal	Generaal-majoor	Brigadegeneraal	Kolonel	Luitenant-kolonel	Majoor	Kapitein-commandant	Kapitein	Luitenant	Onderluitenant
Belgian Land Component		Général	Lieutenant général	Général-major	Général de Brigade	Colonel	Lieutenant-colonel	Major	Capitaine-commandant	Capitaine	Lieutenant	Sous-lieutenant
Belgian Land Component		General	Generalleutnant	Generalmajor	Brigadegeneral	Oberst	Oberstleutnant	Major	Stabshauptmann	Hauptmann	Leutnant	Unterleutnant

==== Other ranks ====
The rank insignia of non-commissioned officers and enlisted personnel.

NATO code	OR-9		OR-8	OR-7	OR-6		OR-5	OR-4		OR-3	OR-2	OR-1
Belgian Land Component
Belgian Land Component	Adjudant-majoor	Adjudant-chef	Adjudant	1ste sergeant-majoor	1ste sergeant-chef	1ste sergeant	Sergeant	1ste korporaal-chef	Korporaal-chef	Korporaal	1ste soldaat	Soldaat
Belgian Land Component	Adjudant-major	Adjudant-chef	Adjudant	1e sergent-major	1e sergent-chef	1e sergent	Sergent	1e caporal-chef	Caporal-chef	Caporal	1 soldat	Soldat
Belgian Land Component	Majoradjutant	Chefadjudant	Adjudant	1er Sergeant major	1er Sergeant chef	1er Sergeant	Sergeant	1er Korporal chef	Korporal chef	Korporal	1er soldat	Soldat

== Equipment ==
The Belgian Army went through a major re-equipment programme for most of its vehicles. The aim was to phase out all tracked vehicles in favour of wheeled vehicles. As of 2010, the tank units were to be disbanded or amalgamated with the Armored Infantry (two infantry companies and one tank squadron per battalion). Forty Leopard 1 tanks were to be sold. As of 2013, only some M113 variants (Radar, recovery, command posts, and driving school vehicles) and Leopard variants (Recovery, AVLB, Pionier, driving tanks) will remain in service.

The Leopard 1A5 tank was retired on 10 September 2014. 56 of the tanks were sold, about 24 will stay as historic monuments or serve as a museum pieces; the rest will be phased out or used for target practice. In 2008 a sale of 43 Leopard 1A5(BE) to Lebanon was concluded, but as of 2018 was not finalized due to "the absence of licensing for export from Germany."

In the strategical defense vision report of the Belgian government, it was stated that by 2030 the Belgian Army will invest in new modern equipment such as weapons, vehicles, communication assets, body armor and more.
