= 4th Group CIS =

4th Group Communication and Information Systems
- Country: Belgium
- Branch: Belgian Army
- Type: Signals
- Part of: Motorized Brigade
- Garrison/HQ: Marche-en-Famenne

Commanders
- Commander: Major Marc Segers

The 4th Group Communication and Information Systems is a military communications unit in the Belgian Army of the Belgian Armed Forces. It forms part of the Motorized Brigade. In April 2024 Marche-en-Famenne became the formal sponsor of the group.
