= 4th Engineer Battalion (Belgium) =

- Active: 1913
- Country: Belgium
- Branch: Belgian Army
- Type: Engineer
- Part of: Motorized Brigade
- Garrison/HQ: Amay

The 4th Engineer Battalion (French: 4 Bataillon du Génie) is an engineer battalion in the Belgian Army of the Belgian Armed Forces.

== Organisation ==
The 4th Engineer Battalion comprises:

- Staff
- HQ
- 315th General Support company : CBRN, construction & fighting divers
- 14th combat engineers company
- 67th combat engineers company
