= Jagers te Paard Battalion =

Jager te Paard Battalion
- Active: 4 July 2011
- Country: Belgium
- Branch: Belgian Army
- Type: Reconnaissance, exploration and observation
- Size: 675 personnel
- Part of: 1st Brigade
- Garrison/HQ: Kwartier Cdt de Hemptinne, Heverlee, Belgium
- Motto: zien zonder gezien te worden (see without being seen)

The Jagers te Paard Battalion (Dutch: Battjon Jagers te Paard) (French: Bataillon de chasseurs à cheval) is a reconnaissance battalion in the Motorized Brigade of the Belgian Armed Forces. Jagers te Paard translates into English as Hunters on Horses, the lineage of the current battalion came into existence in 2011 with the linking of the 1st Jagers te Paard with 2nd Jagers te Paard/4th Chasseurs à Cheval when re-rolled in to its current role as an Intelligence, Surveillance, Reconnaissance & Target Acquisition (ISTAR) battalion supporting the Motorized Brigade.

== Recent History ==
As part of recent anti-Semitic attacks on international Jewish communities (specifically the March 22, 2026 Hatzola arson attack on four Hatzalah ambulances in Britain), the battalion has been deployed to guard "Jewish sites" against potential attacks by extremists.

== Organisation ==
Jagers te Paard Battalion

- HQ staff and Support Squadron
- A Reconnaissance Squadron
- B Reconnaissance Squadron
- C Radar and Ground Sensors Squadron
- D Training Squadron

A and B Squadrons' each have a Voltigeurs platoon for dismounted reconnaissance, C Squadron can be integrated/interface with 80th UAV Squadron, employing their sensor and analysis capabilities from the Belgian Air Force.
