= Leopoldsburg =

Leopoldsburg: Bourg-Léopold (French)
- Municipality
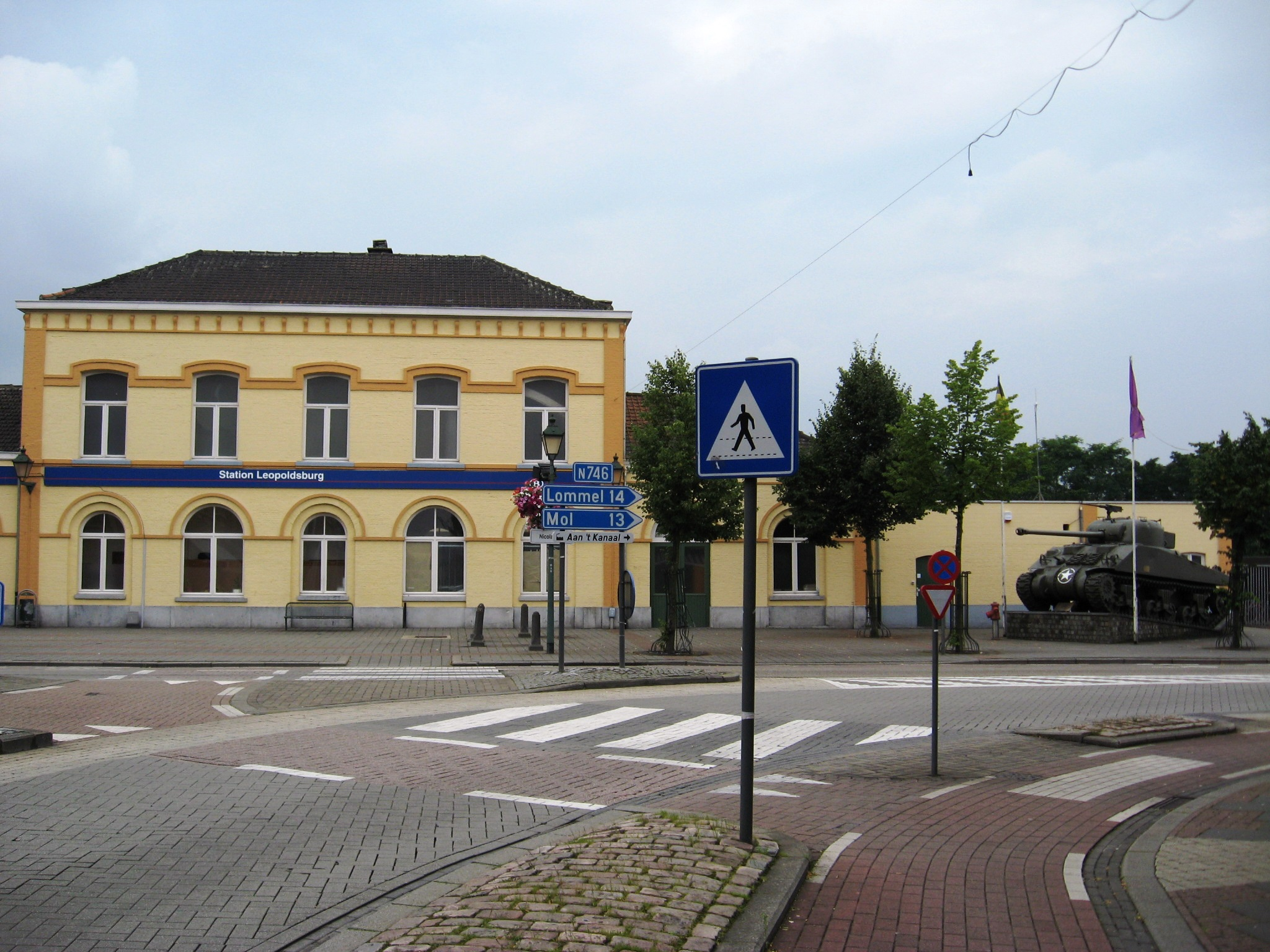

- Flag Coat of arms

- Location of Leopoldsburg in Limburg
- Interactive map of Leopoldsburg
- Location in Belgium
- Coordinates: 51°07′09″N 05°15′39″E
- Country: Belgium
- Community: Flemish Community
- Region: Flemish Region
- Province: Limburg
- Arrondissement: Hasselt

Government
  - Mayor: Wouter Beke (CD&V)
  - Governing parties: Vooruit, CD&V

Area
  - Total: 22.6 km^{2} (8.7 sq mi)

Population (2018-01-01)
  - Total: 15,625
  - Density: 691/km^{2} (1,790/sq mi)
- Postal codes: 3970, 3971
- NIS code: 71034
- Area codes: 011

Leopoldsburg (Dutch: [ˈleːjoːpɔltsˌbʏr(ə)x]; French: Bourg-Léopold [buʁ leɔpɔl]; Limburgish: Leopolsbörch) is a municipality located in the Belgian province of Limburg. On January 1, 2006, Leopoldsburg had a total population of 14,403. The total area is 22.49 km^{2} (8.68 sq mi) which gives a population density of 640 inhabitants per square kilometre (1,700 inhabitants/mi^{2}). It is situated near the important military base at Beverloo Camp. The municipality consists of the following sub-municipalities: Leopoldsburg proper and Heppen.

== History ==
The town saw heavy fighting in September 1944 during Operation Market-Garden. Every year, these things are remembered by the town during remembrance engagements next to local highschools and hospitals. All combatants and civilian casualties are remembered.

William Cavendish, Marquess of Hartington, British politician and Army officer, was shot and killed in Heppen on 9 September 1944 by a sniper whilst leading a company trying to capture the town from troops of the Waffen-SS. He is buried at the Leopoldsburg War Cemetery. Cavendish was the husband of Kathleen "Kick" Kennedy, sister of U.S. President John F. Kennedy.

== See also ==
- Limburg Shotguns, an American Football team from Leopoldsburg
