= Belgian Armed Forces =

Combined military forces of Belgium

- Belgische Defensie (Dutch); La Défense belge (French); Belgische Streitkräfte (German)
- Emblem of the Belgian Armed Forces
- Motto: Unity makes Strength; Dutch: eendracht maakt macht French: L'union fait la Force; German: Einigkeit macht stark
- Founded: 1830; 196 years ago
- Service branches: Belgian Army; Belgian Air Force; Belgian Navy; Belgian Medical Service; Belgian Cyber Force
- Headquarters: Evere

Leadership
- King: Philippe
- Prime Minister: Bart De Wever
- Minister of Defence: Theo Francken
- Chief of Defence: General Frederik Vansina

Personnel
- Conscription: Suspended since 1992
- Active personnel: 26,389 military personnel (2025)
- Reserve personnel: ~6,600 (2023)
- Deployed personnel: less than 1,000 (2023)

Expenditure
- Budget: 12.8 billion € (2025)
- Percent of GDP: 2 % (2025)

Industry
- Domestic suppliers: FN Herstal; John Cockerill; SABCA; SONACA; Thales Belgium; KNDS Belgium; Scioteq; OIP Sensor Systems; Exail Robotics Belgium; Safran Aero Boosters
- Foreign suppliers: European Union; France; NATO; Switzerland; United States

Related articles
- Ranks: Belgian military ranks

The Belgian Armed Forces are the combined national military forces of Belgium. The King of the Belgians is the commander-in-chief of the Armed Forces. The Belgian Armed Forces was established after Belgium became independent in October 1830. Since then, the Belgian armed forces have fought in World War I, World War II, the Cold War (Korean War and the Belgian occupation of the Federal Republic of Germany), Kosovo, Rwanda, Somalia and Afghanistan. The Armed Forces comprise five branches: the Belgian Army, the Belgian Air Force, the Belgian Navy, the Belgian Medical Service and the Belgian Cyber Force.

== History ==
=== Establishment ===
When Belgium broke away from the Netherlands in 1830 it was initially expected that a neutral buffer state, with its borders guaranteed by France, Britain and Prussia, could avoid the need for an expensive permanent military force, relying instead on the part-time militia of the existing Garde Civique (Civil Guard). The need for a regular army was however soon acknowledged. The basis for recruitment was one of selective conscription under which exemptions could be purchased by obtaining substitutes. In practice this meant that only about a quarter of each year's eligible intake actually served, with the burden falling on the poorer classes.

=== Early history ===
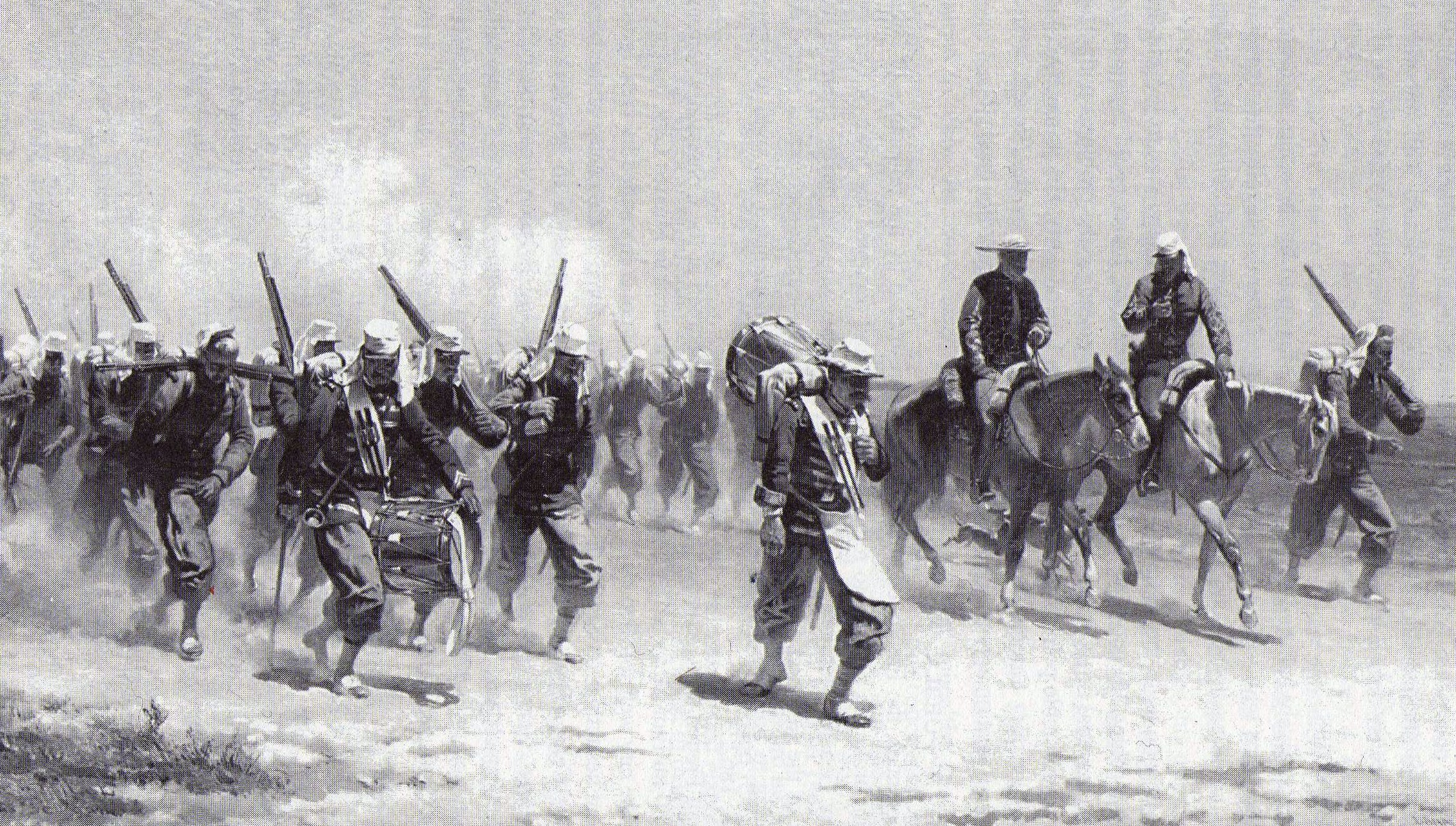
Soldiers of the Corps Expeditionnaire Belge during the Franco-Mexican War

As part of the national policy of even-handed neutrality, the 19th century Belgian Army was deployed as an essentially defensive force in fortifications facing the Dutch, German and French borders. Mobilisation plans simply required reservists to report to their depots, without arrangements being made in advance for deployment in a particular direction or against a particular enemy. Recruitment difficulties caused the army to remain below its intended strength of 20,000 men, although new legislation in 1868 tightened the basis for conscription. The Franco-Prussian War of 1870 required full mobilisation for nearly a year, a process which showed up serious training and structural weaknesses. The presence of Belgian forces in strength along the country's borders, supported by intelligence provided by the Belgian civil security service, did however ensure that the combat at no time spilled over into Belgian territory.

As late as the 1890s the Belgian Army still retained a system of selective service, at a time when most European states were moving to a principle of universal obligation, according to the Prussian model. In Belgium conscripts were selected through the drawing of ballots, but individuals could escape service by paying for substitutes. This system favored the well-off and had been discarded elsewhere as inefficient and unpatriotic. For those conscripted the terms of service required eight years in the regular army (of which part might be spent on "unlimited leave"), followed by five years as a reservist. Various categories of volunteer enjoyed such privileges as being able to specify their branch of service, bounties and higher pay.

The Papal Army based in Rome included from 1860 a battalion-sized unit known as the Tirailleurs Franco-Belges (Franco-Belgian Sharpshooters). Recruited amongst volunteers from both countries, this became the Pontifical Zouaves in 1861 and fought as an allied force on the French side in 1871 during the Franco-Prussian War.

In 1864 a Corps Expeditionnaire Belge (Belgian Expeditionary Corps) was raised for service in Mexico. Originally intended to serve as the Guard of the Belgian-born Empress Charlotte this 1,500 strong force was largely drawn from volunteers seconded from the Belgian Army. Known popularly as the Belgian Legion, it saw active service in Mexico as part of the Imperial forces, before returning to Belgium for disbandment in March 1867.

From 1885 the Force Publique was established as the military garrison and police force in the Congo Free State, a separate state under the direct rule of King Leopold II. Initially led by a variety of European mercenaries, this colonial force was subsequently officered by Belgian regulars after the 1908 annexation of the Free State by Belgium as the colony of the Belgian Congo.

From December 1904 a small detachment of Belgian troops was permanently based in China as the "Guard of the Belgian Legation in Beijing".

Reforms undertaken in the early years of the 20th century included the abolition in 1909 of the system of drawing lots for the selection of the annual intake of conscripts. In 1913, compulsory and universal military service for men was established in Belgium. While this enabled actual peacetime strength to be increased to 33,000 men (increased to 120,500 on mobilisation), this was only sufficient to provide a basis for the creation of seven under-strength divisions (one of cavalry) plus artillery and fortress troops. The Belgian military was also affected by political and popular reliance on the supposedly certain protection of the country's internationally guaranteed neutrality. In the words of the historian Barbara W. Tuchman "the army was considered superfluous and slightly absurd". Training and discipline were slack, equipment inadequate and even field uniforms for active service were old fashioned and impractical.

Although improvements in the Belgian Army had been uneven during the 19th and early 20th centuries, one area of successful reform had been that of increasing the professionalism of the officer corps. The Royal Military Academy had been established in 1834, to be followed by the Ecole d'Application for technical training, and the Ecole de Guerre for staff training in 1868. The Belgian Army pioneered the practice of training a corps of finance, personnel and general administration specialist officers instead of leaving such functions to civil servants without military experience or inadequately prepared line officers. There was however a serious shortage of trained officers in the rapidly expanding army of 1913.

=== Army in 1914 ===
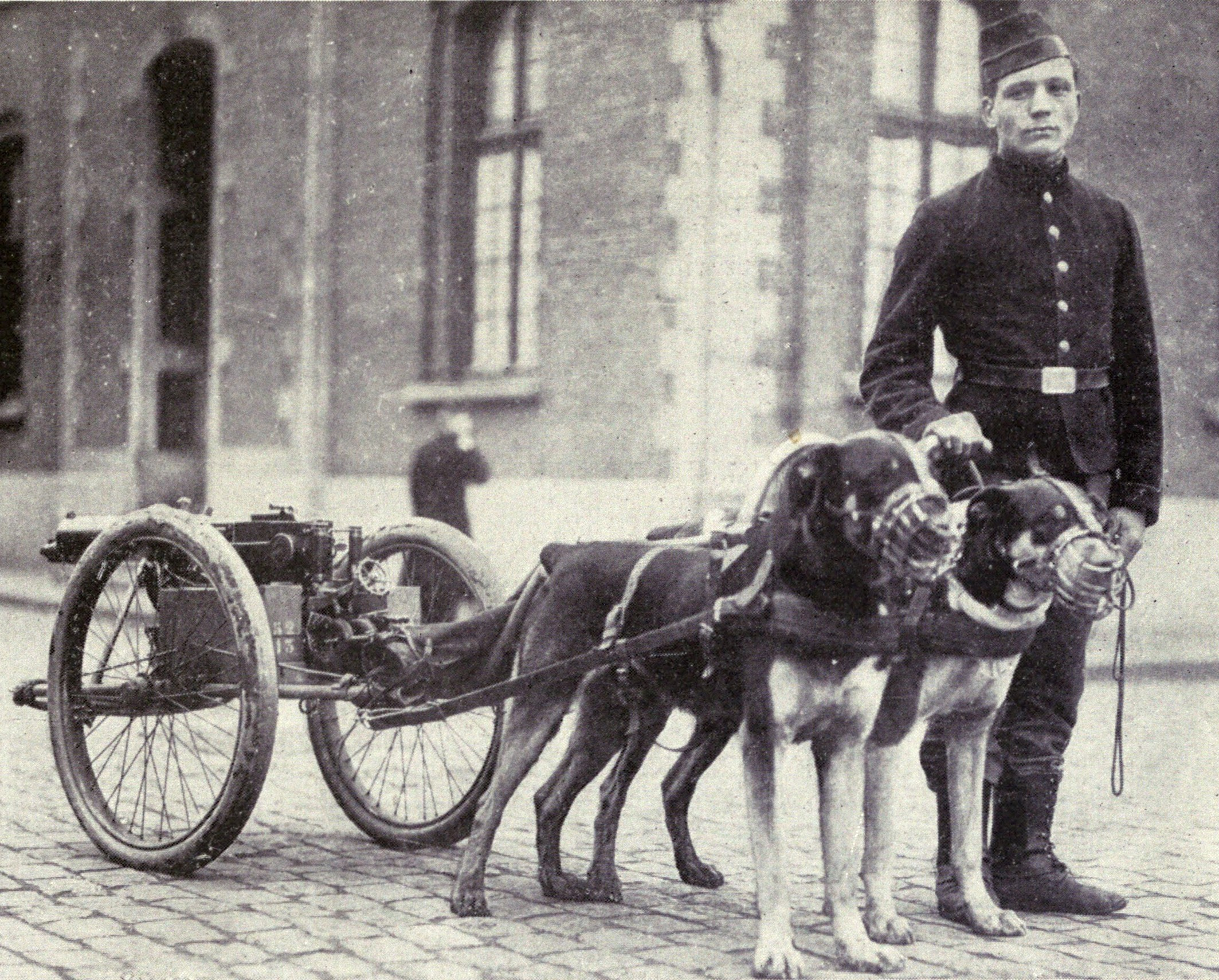
A Belgian machine gun team, 1914

On the eve of World War I, the Belgian Army comprised 19 infantry regiments (line, Chasseurs à pied, Grenadier and Carabinier), 10 cavalry (Guides, Lancers and Chasseurs à cheval) and 8 artillery (mounted, field and fortress). Support forces included engineers, gendarmerie, fortress troops, train and civil guards. The seven divisions of the Field Army were intended to provide a mobile force while the 65,000 fortress troops provided garrisons for the substantial forts constructed around Antwerp, Liège and Namur. These fortifications had been built in several stages beginning in 1859, though a number were still incompleted in 1914. While well-designed and built by 19th century standards, these fixed defences with their sunken artillery turrets had been rendered obsolete by recent advances in heavy siege artillery howitzers.

=== World War I ===
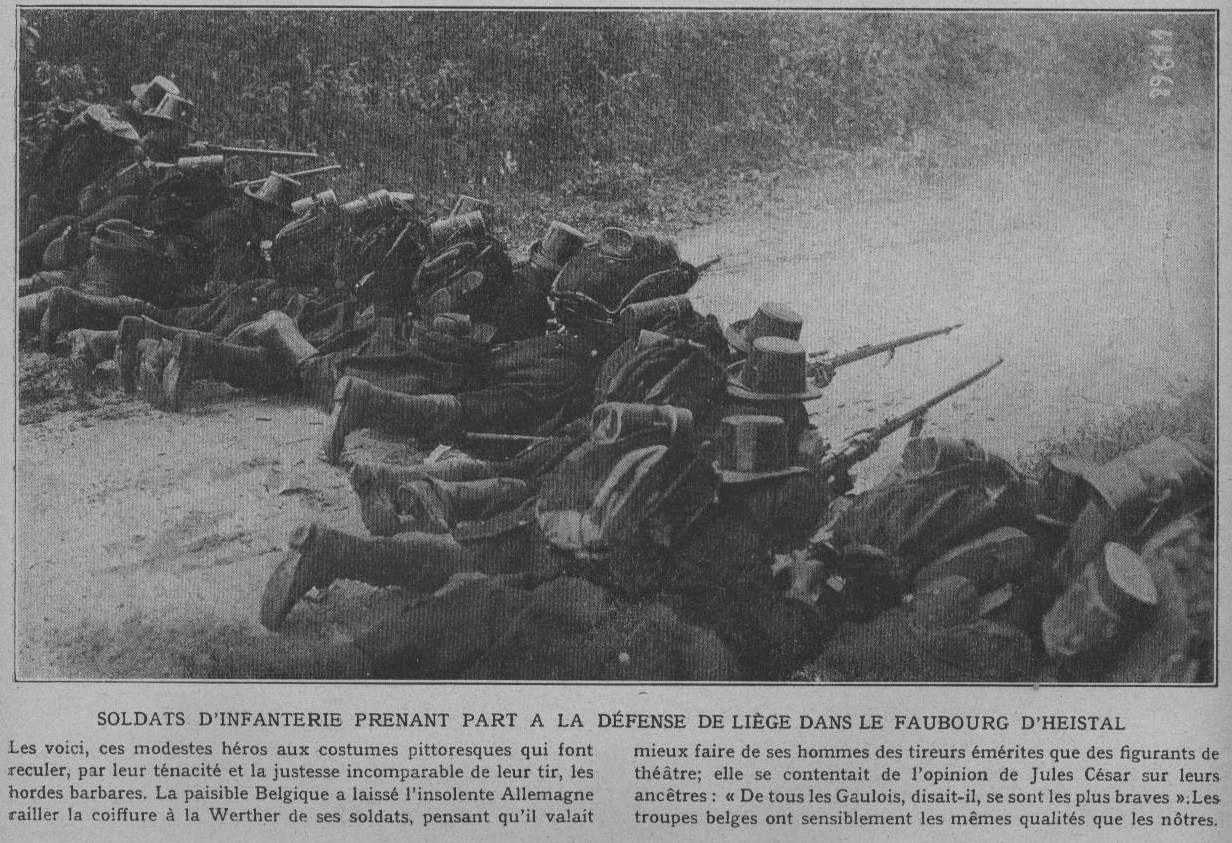
Belgian carabiniers defending Liège in August 1914

At the start of World War I in August 1914, the Belgian armed forces were being restructured, due to this measure and the rapid occupation of Belgium only 20% of men were mobilised and incorporated into the armed forces. Ultimately, 350,000 men were incorporated into the Belgian armed forces, although one third of these did not participate directly in combat.

Invaded by surprise by the Imperial German Army, which was approximately 600,000 men strong, the small, ill-equipped, 117,000-strong Belgian army succeeded, for ten days, in holding the German army in front of Liège in 1914. They fought between the emplaced forts in the area and with their support. This strategy was based on the Napoleonic concept of fighting the advance force and preventing a portion of the enemy forces joining the main body. At the time, the authorities and the public celebrated a determined Belgian resistance that the Germans did not expect.

For four years, under the command of King Albert I, the Belgian army guarded the important sector of the Allied left wing between Nieuwpoort, on the coast, and Ypres with the help of the forces of the Entente but did not participate in any of the major Allied offensives, which were deemed unnecessarily expensive in terms of cost and manpower by the King of the Belgians.

In 1916, a body of Belgian armoured cars were moved from the IJzer front to help the Russian Empire. The force found itself alongside an identical body sent by the British on the Eastern Front.

In Africa a company-sized unit of Belgian colonial troops participated in the occupation of the German colony of Togoland, The Force Publique subsequently played a major role in the East African Campaign against German forces in German East Africa, providing over 12,000 askaris under Belgian officers for the Allied offensive of February 1916. The most significant Belgian action was the capture of Tabora in September 1916, by a force under the command of General Charles Tombeur.

In Belgium, after four years of war, as of 26 May 1918, the army had 166,000 men of which 141,974 were combatants, forming twelve infantry divisions and one cavalry division. It had 129 aircraft and 952 guns of all calibres. From September, the Belgian army was involved in the Allied offensive until the final victory of 11 November 1918.

=== Between the Wars ===
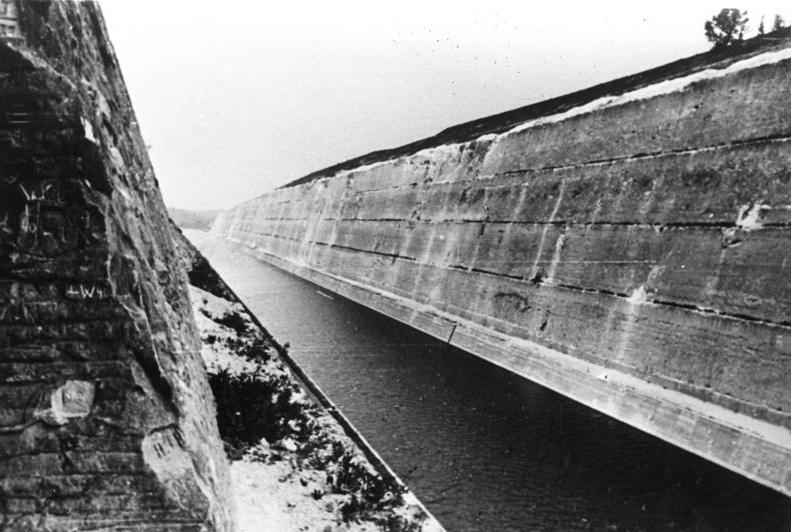
Fort Eben-Emael was part of the Fortified Position of Liège and was completed in 1935.

After the Armistice with Germany of 1918, the Belgian government sought to retain the strategy of 1914. Little effort was made to acquire tanks and aircraft for the Belgian armed forces, while instead the Government strengthened the fortifications of Liège and Antwerp. This was despite the fact that during World War I the forts had proved ineffective despite strong support from artillery and infantry. Until 1936, Belgium remained allied to France and the United Kingdom.

The Belgian Army underwent a series of reductions from 12 divisions in 1923 to only four after 1926. The rank and file consisted almost entirely of conscripts serving full-time for only 13 months, before entering the reserves.

=== World War II ===
On 1 September 1939, when the Wehrmacht invaded Poland, King Leopold III of Belgium ordered a general mobilisation, in which 600,000 Belgians were mobilised. Despite warnings from the French and British governments, the King refused an alliance. Belgium was invaded, defeated, and occupied in an 18 Days' Campaign after 10 May 1940. Later, 163 Belgian troops were rescued during the Dunkirk evacuation, and Belgium's new navy, the Corps de Marine, only reformed in 1939, also participated.

After the defeat in 1940, significant numbers of Belgian soldiers and civilians escaped to Britain to join the Belgian forces in exile. The Belgian government, under Hubert Pierlot, evacuated to London where it remained until the liberation in 1944.

Belgian soldiers formed the 1st Belgian Infantry Brigade (which also included an artillery battery of soldiers from Luxembourg) more often known as the Brigade Piron after its commanding officer, Jean-Baptiste Piron. The Brigade Piron was involved in the Normandy Invasion and the battles in France and the Netherlands until liberation.

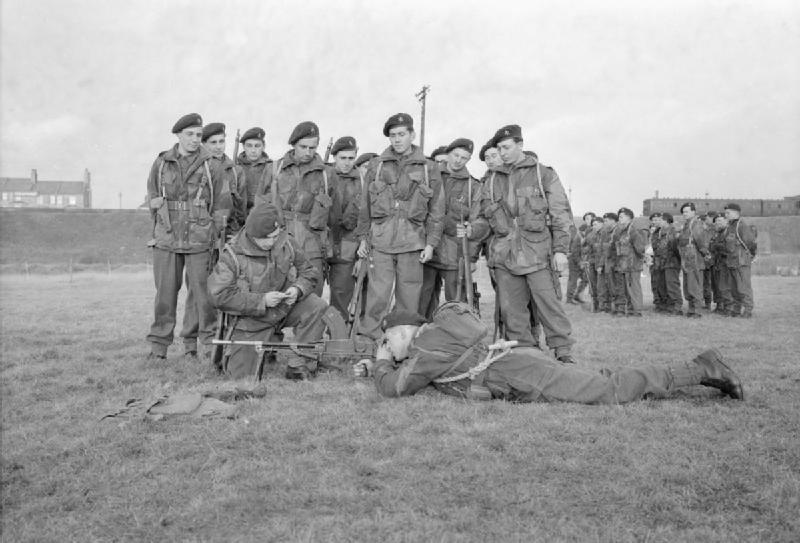
Belgian commandos training in Britain, 1945

Belgians also served in British special forces units during the war, forming a troop of No.10 Commando which was involved in the Italian Campaign and Landings on Walcheren. The British 5th Special Air Service (SAS) was entirely made up of Belgians.

Two Belgian fighter units, the 349th and 350th Squadrons, were formed in the Royal Air Force, with over 400 pilots. The 350th Squadron alone claimed over 50 "kills" between its formation in November 1941 and the end of the war.

Two corvettes and a group of minesweepers were also operated by the Belgians during the Battle of the Atlantic, numbering some 350 men by 1943. Most military Belgian vessels of the Belgian navy were interned in Spain, except for the patrol craft P16, which managed to escape to the United Kingdom, where it became HMS Kernot.

The Force Publique also participated in the East African Campaign and were instrumental to forcing the Italian surrender in Abyssinia.

Belgium in World War II
Strength of primary military organizations
Military Organization	Period	Total personnel over time
1940 Army	May–June 1940	600,000–650,000
Free Belgian Forces	1940–1944	ca. 8,000
Belgian Army 1944–1945	June 1944 – May 1945	ca. 100,000
SS volunteers	April 1941 – May 1945	ca. 15,000
SS figures from Kenneth Estes A European Anabasis.

=== Post-1945 ===
The harsh lessons of World War II made collective security a priority for Belgian foreign policy. In March 1948 Belgium signed the Treaty of Brussels, and then joined NATO in 1948. However the integration of the armed forces into NATO did not begin until after the Korean War, to which Belgium (in co-operation with Luxembourg) sent a detachment known as the Belgian Volunteer Corps for Korea. Later Belgium contributed a corps to NATO's Northern Army Group. Defence expenditure grew along with the force size. In 1948 the army was 75,000 strong which grew to 150,000 by 1952. A major defence review in 1952 set a target of three active and two reserve divisions, a 400-aircraft air force and a fifteen-ship navy. Forty anti-aircraft defence battalions were created, linked with radar and a centralised command-and-control system.

As a safeguard against Belgium being invaded again, two major bases, Kitona and Kamina, were established in the Belgian Congo. They were almost viewed as a 'national redoubt,' permitting the survival and rebuilding of forces if Belgium were again invaded.

Following a change in government in 1954 conscript service was reduced to 18 months. The Belgian Army gained nuclear capability in the 1950s with Honest John missiles initially and then with nuclear-capable tube artillery. It also adopted the U.S. Pentomic organization, but then switched to a triangular division structure by the early 1960s. Just after independence in the Congo, a Metropolitan Command (Cometro) was active to control the Belgian forces there.

From October 1993 to March 1996, Belgium participated in UNAMIR, a UN Peacekeeping mission meant to end the Rwandan genocide. While protecting the Rwandan prime minister, 10 soldiers from the 2nd Commando Battalion were tortured and executed by the Rwandan Presidential Guard. Rwandan Major Bernard Ntuyahaga was later convicted for the murders in 2007.

=== 21st Century ===
- 2001 – now: QRA (Benelux airspace)
- 2003, March – 2004, 2 December: SFOR (part of NATO Peacekeepers) (Bosnia and Herzegovina)
- 2004, 30 March – now: Baltic Air Policing (part of NATO QRA) (Estonia, Latvia, Lithuania)
- 2004, 7 August – 2014: ISAF (part of NATO) (Afghanistan: Hamid Karzai International Airport, Mazar-I-Sharif, Kunduz, Kandahar Ahmad Shah Baba International Airport)
- 2006, 30 August – 2014, December: UNIFIL (as UN Peacekeepers and deminers) (South Lebanon: Israel–Lebanon border)
- 2008, February – 2009, 15 March: EUFOR Chad/CAR (Chad, Central African Republic)
- 2010, 30 June–present: MONUSCO (continuation of MONUC) (as UN Peacekeepers) (Democratic Republic of the Congo: Kinshasa, France: Brest)
- 2011, 21 March – 2011, 31 March: Operation Odyssey Dawn (part of NATO) (Libya, Greece: Araxos Air Base)
- 2013–2023: MINUSMA (as UN Peacekeepers) (Mali: Bamako, Gao, Germany: Potsdam)
- 2013–present: EUTM (Mali)
- 2014–present: Operation Desert Falcon (part of Operation Inherent Resolve) (Iraq: Bagdhad, Erbil, Syria, Kuwait, United States: Tampa, Germany: Ramstein EPEI, United Arab Emirates: Al Dhafra)
- 2014, 10 August–present: Operation Atalanta (part of EU NAVFOR) (Gulf of Aden, Somalian Coast, Arabian Sea, Indian Ocean)
- 2015, 7 January–present: Operation Vigilant Guardian (Belgium)
  - As a result of the increased threat of terrorism after the shooting at the Charlie Hebdo newspaper's offices in Paris, France. The Belgian Armed Forces initiated Operation Vigilant Guardian, meant to assist the police with securing high-profile targets in major Belgian cities. After the attacks on 22 March 2016, this military protection was expanded to include soft targets in the public space, allocating 2000 army personnel for deployment. Currently, 550 service members remain deployed for public safety.
- 2015–2021: Resolute Support Mission (continuation of ISAF) (part of NATO) (Afghanistan)
- 2016–present: Cooperation with Tunisia for training, force protection and demining. (Tunisia)
- 2017–present: Operation New Nero (Niger, Sahel region, Northern Benin: port of Cotonou, CPADD)
- 2020, February–present: European-Led Maritime Awareness in the Strait of Hormuz (EMASOH) (Persian Gulf, Strait of Hormuz, Abu Dhabi)
- 2021: Operation Sea Guardian (part of NATO) (United Kingdom: Northwood OHQ)
- 2021: Operation Irini (part of EU NAVFOR MED)
- 2021: Nato Training Mission Iraq (part of NATO)

== Structure ==
Since July 2024 the Belgian Armed Forces are structured as follows:

- Belgian Army (Force Terrestre / Landmacht)
- Belgian Air Force (Force Aérienne / Luchtmacht)
- Belgian Navy (Marine)
- Belgian Medical Service (Service Médicale / Medische dienst)
- Belgian Cyber Force (Force Cyber / Cybermacht)

Special Operations Command or SOCOM, does not have direct command over special operations, but is an intermediary center for coordination and communication of special operations between the armed forces components. The command provides advice and expertise and is also tasked with acquisition and distributions of equipment for SOF units. SOCOM is managed by ACOS Readiness and Operations.

Currently, SOCOM is responsible for setting up the new Composite Special Operations Command Center or C-SOCC. This new command center is an international project between Special Operations units of Belgium, The Netherlands and Denmark.

The Belgian Army, Air Force, Medical Services, and Cyber Force all use the same military ranks. The Navy's ranks are unique in the Belgian Armed Forces.

=== Belgian Military Bases ===
==== Flanders ====
===== Army Bases =====
- Brasschaat – Bataljon Artillerie (Artillery Battalion) – 450 soldiers
- Burcht – 11e Bataljon Genie (Engineering Battalion) – 580 soldiers
- Gavere – 17e Compagnie van het 3e Bataljon Parachutisten (Paratrooper Company) – 120 soldiers
- Grobbendonk – 29ste Bataljon Logistiek (Logistics Battalion) – 500 soldiers
- Leopoldsburg – Hoofdkwartier Gemotoriseerde Brigade (Mechanized Brigade HQ) – ~2,000 soldiers
- Lombardsijde – Artillerie- en Infanteriebasis (Artillery and Infantry Base) – 430 soldiers, expanding to 1,200
- Tielen – 3rd Paratroopers Battalion – ~500 soldiers

===== Air Force Bases =====
- Kleine-Brogel – 10e Tactische Wing (Tactical Wing) – 1,300 soldiers
- Koksijde – 40ste Smaldeel (Helicopter Unit) – 250 soldiers
- Melsbroek – 15e Air Transport Wing – ~1,000 soldiers

===== Navy Bases =====
- Zeebrugge – Marinebasis (Main Naval Base) – 1,000–1,500 soldiers
- Oostende – Mijnenbestrijdingsschool EGUERMIN (Mine Warfare School, future Navy Academy) – 100, expanding to 500

===== Special Facilities =====
- Evere – Hoofdkwartier Defensie (Defense HQ) – Up to 4,000 personnel
- Peutie – Special Operations Regiment & Logistic Base – 1,170 soldiers
- Meerdaal – Hoofdkwartier DOVO (Explosive Ordnance Disposal) – 200 personnel
- Poelkapelle – DOVO-kazerne (Explosive Ordnance Disposal Base) – 120 soldiers
- Schaffen – Paratrooper Training Center – 190 soldiers
- Sint-Truiden (Saffraanberg) – Koninklijke School voor Onderofficieren (Royal Non-Commissioned Officer School) – Up to 1,500 students
- Koninklijke Militaire School (Brussels) – Officer Training School – Several hundred students
- Neder-over-Heembeek – Militair Hospitaal (Military Hospital) – 700 personnel

==== Wallonia ====
===== Army Bases =====
- Amay – 4e Bataljon Genie (Engineering Battalion) – 600 soldiers
- Bertrix – 260ste Compagnie Munitie (Munitions Storage) – Limited personnel
- Doornik – Belgian Defense Logistic School – 240 soldiers
- Elsenborn – Trainingskamp voor zware wapens (Heavy Weapons Training Camp) – 150 soldiers
- Flawinne – 2e Bataljon Commando’s (Commando Battalion) – 650 soldiers
- Marche-en-Famenne – Regiment Ardense Jagers, 1/3 Lansiers en 4e Logistiek Bataljon – 2,050 soldiers

===== Air Force Bases =====
- Bevekom (Beauvechain) – 1ste Wing (Helicopter and Training Base) – 1,300 soldiers
- Florennes – 2e Tactische Wing (Tactical Wing with F-16s and Drones) – 1,125 soldiers

=== Belgian Army ===
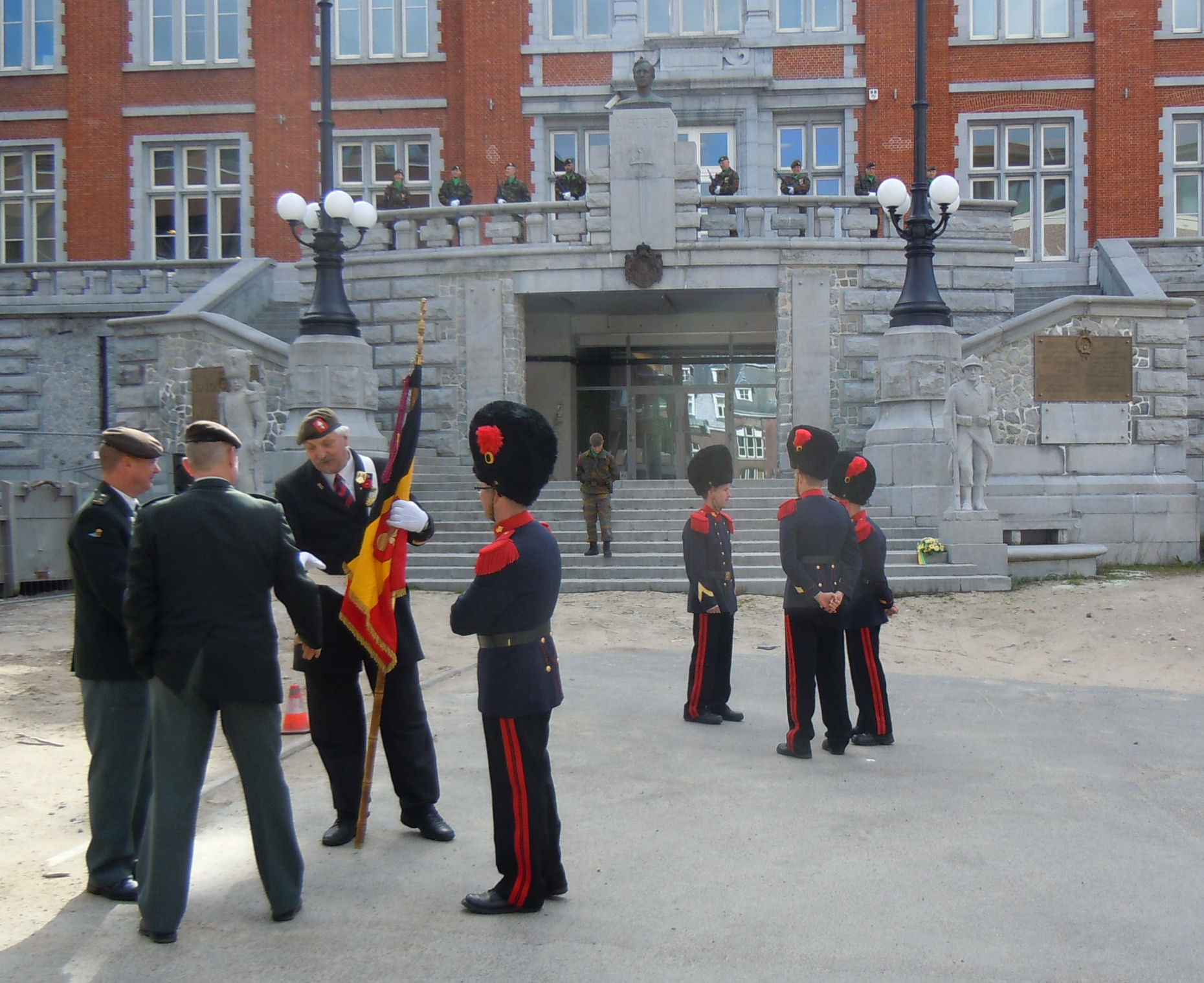
Belgian grenadiers at a memorial service

The Belgian Army is the ground arm of the Belgian Armed Forces. The Army Commander is Major-General Pierre Gérard.(since 18 October 2019). The Army consists of one staff (COMOPSLAND), one motorized brigade, one special operations regiment supported by an artillery battalion, two engineer battalions and a reconnaissance (ISTAR) battalion. It is also supported by three logistical units, three telecommunication units, four training camps and a center for the training of ground troops.

The Army has around 10,000 troops (as of 2023) and trained for foreign operations in a multinational environment. Around 7500 of them are part of the Motorized Brigade (Belgium) and ~1500 part of Special Operations Regiment (Belgium) and around ~1000 are part of other branches such as military police, Explosive Removal and Destruction Service (DOVO) and more.

=== Belgian Air Force ===
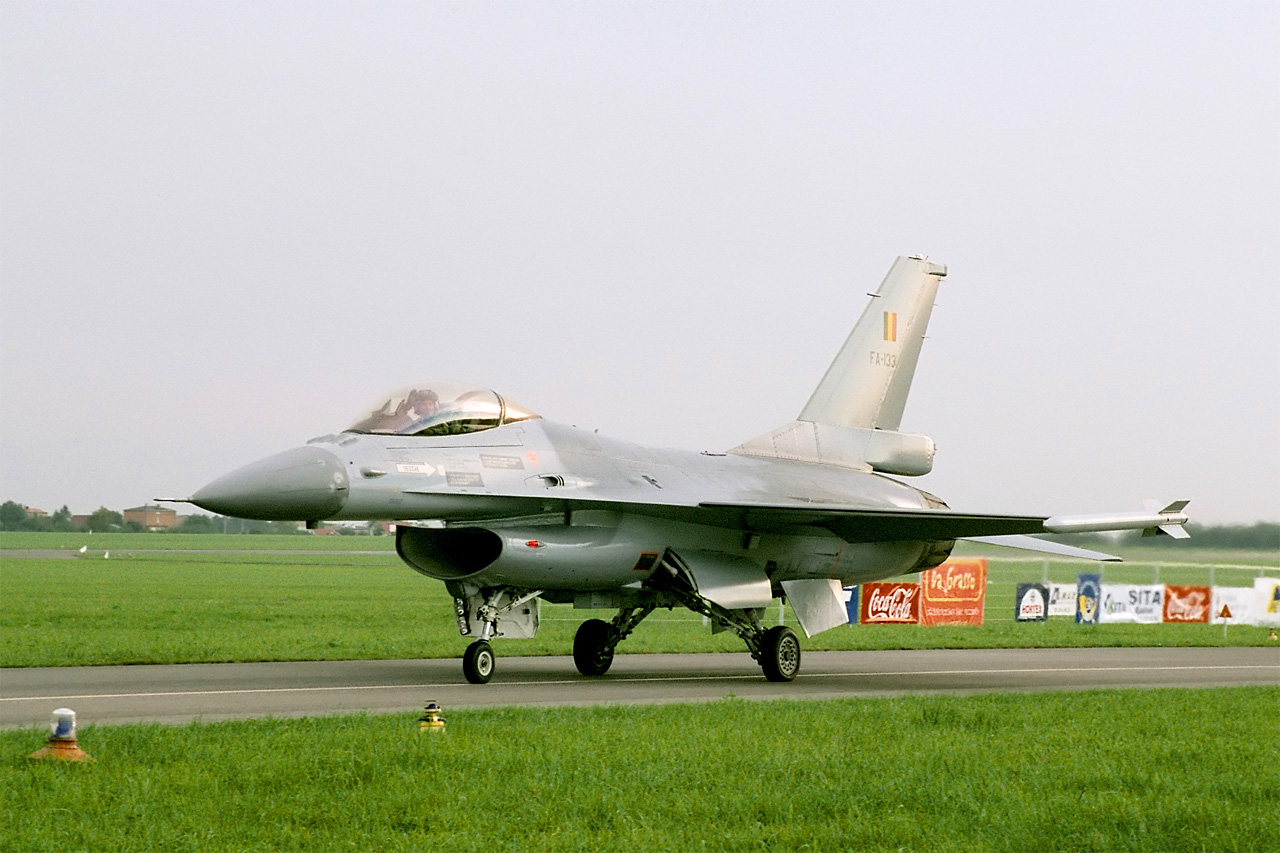
An F-16 jet of the Belgian Air Force

The Belgian Air Force is the air arm of the Belgian Armed Forces. The history of the Belgian Air Force began in 1910 when the Minister of War, General Hellebout, decided after his first flight to acquire aeroplanes. On 5 May 1911 a Farman type 1910 was delivered, followed by a second on 24 May and two other in August of the same year.

The air force consists of two fighter aircraft wings, the 2nd Tactical Wing in Florennes operating the F-16 Fighting Falcon and the 10th Tactical Wing in Kleine Brogel also operating the F-16 Fighting Falcon. The air force also has the 15th Air Transport Wing in Melsbroek operating Airbus A400M Atlas modern transport aircraft. The 15th Wing also operates a small fleet of troop transport and VIP aircraft. The fourth and final wing, the 1st Wing in Beauvechain operates training aircraft and helicopters (A-109 helicopters). The air force also has a unit (80 UAV Squadron) flying the MQ-9B SkyGuardian UAV. Aside from these flying units, the air force is supported by several support units, such as an air traffic control center, an air defense center (Control and Reporting Center), a meteorological wing and an aviation safety directorate.

=== Belgian Navy ===
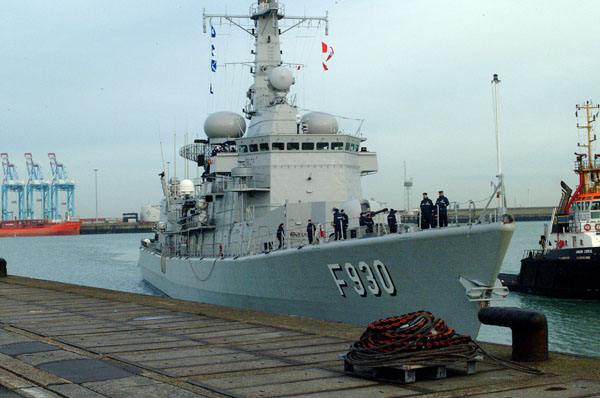
Leopold I, a frigate of the Belgian Navy

The Belgian Navy is the naval arm of the Belgian Armed Forces. It currently has 1,200 personnel and 10 vessels. The Navy Commander is Rear Admiral Jan De Beurme, since 28 September 2020. Current vessels are:

Frigates:

- BNS F930 Leopold I
- BNS F931 Louise-Marie

Minesweepers:

- BNS M916 Bellis
- BNS M917 Crocus
- BNS M921 Lobelia
- BNS M923 Narcis
- BNS M924 Primula

Patrol Boats:

- BNS P901 Castor
- BNS P902 Pollux

Auxiliary Vessels:

- BNS A958 Zenobe Gramme (training ship)

=== Belgian Medical Service ===
The Medical Services is commanded by a Major General and is composed of 1,700 active personnel. Providing medical support to all personnel of the Belgium Armed forces, it consists of a Military Hospital and 2 Medical Battalions as well as a Medical Supply Unit.

=== Intelligence ===
A Belgian military intelligence service was founded on 1 April 1915. The Belgian General Information and Security Service, known as ADIV (Dutch) or SGRS (French) and part of the organisational chart of Belgian Defence as ACOS-IS (Assistant Chief of Staff Intelligence and Security) provides security intelligence for the Armed Forces as well as strategic intelligence for the Belgian government. Its focus is on counterespionage.

The Jagers te Paard Battalion (ISTAR) also conducts military intelligence with a tactical goal of preparing and supporting operations abroad.

== Belgian Royal family in the Belgian Armed Forces ==
Member	Belgian Army	Belgian Air Force	Belgian Navy	Belgian Medical Service
The King	General	General	Admiral	
The Archduchess of Austria-Este				Colonel (2003)
Crown princess Elisabeth	Onderluitenant (2023)			
Prince Gabriel	Officier (2026)			
Prince Laurent			Captain (2004); Fr : Capitaine de Vaisseau; Nl : Kapitein-ter-zee	
Prince Amedeo	Second Lieutenant (2007)			
Prince Joachim			Ensign 2nd Class (2011)	

== See also ==
- List of Belgian military decorations
- Belgian United Nations Command – the Belgian detachment sent to the Korean War of 1950–53
