= Special Forces Group (Belgium) =

Special forces unit in the Belgian Armed Forces

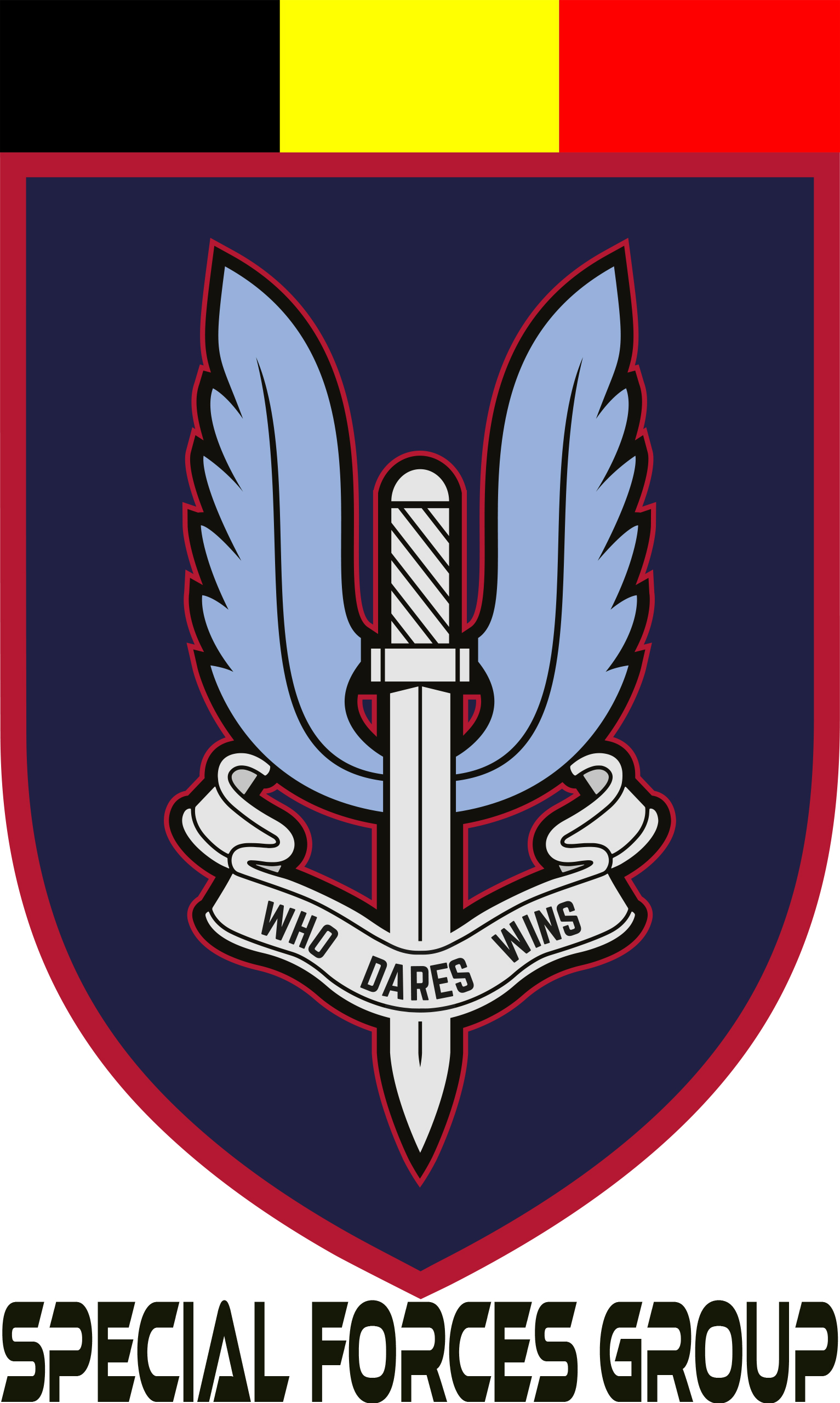
- Special Forces Group badge (identical to that of its British Second World War-era ancestor the 5th Special Air Service)
- Founded: 1993–present
- Country: Belgium
- Allegiance: Special Operations Regiment
- Branch: Belgian Land Component
- Type: Special Mission Unit
- Garrison/HQ: Heverlee
- Mottos: "Far Ahead"; "Who Dares Wins"

Commanders
- Commanding Officer: Lieutenant Colonel Christophe Comhair

The Special Forces Group - 5SAS is a special mission unit of the Belgian Army and the Tier 1 unit of the Special Operations Regiment.

Members of the Special Forces Group - 5SAS are selected from all the branches of the Belgian Armed Forces. Candidates must have at least 3 years of military experience to join the Special Forces Group.

== History ==
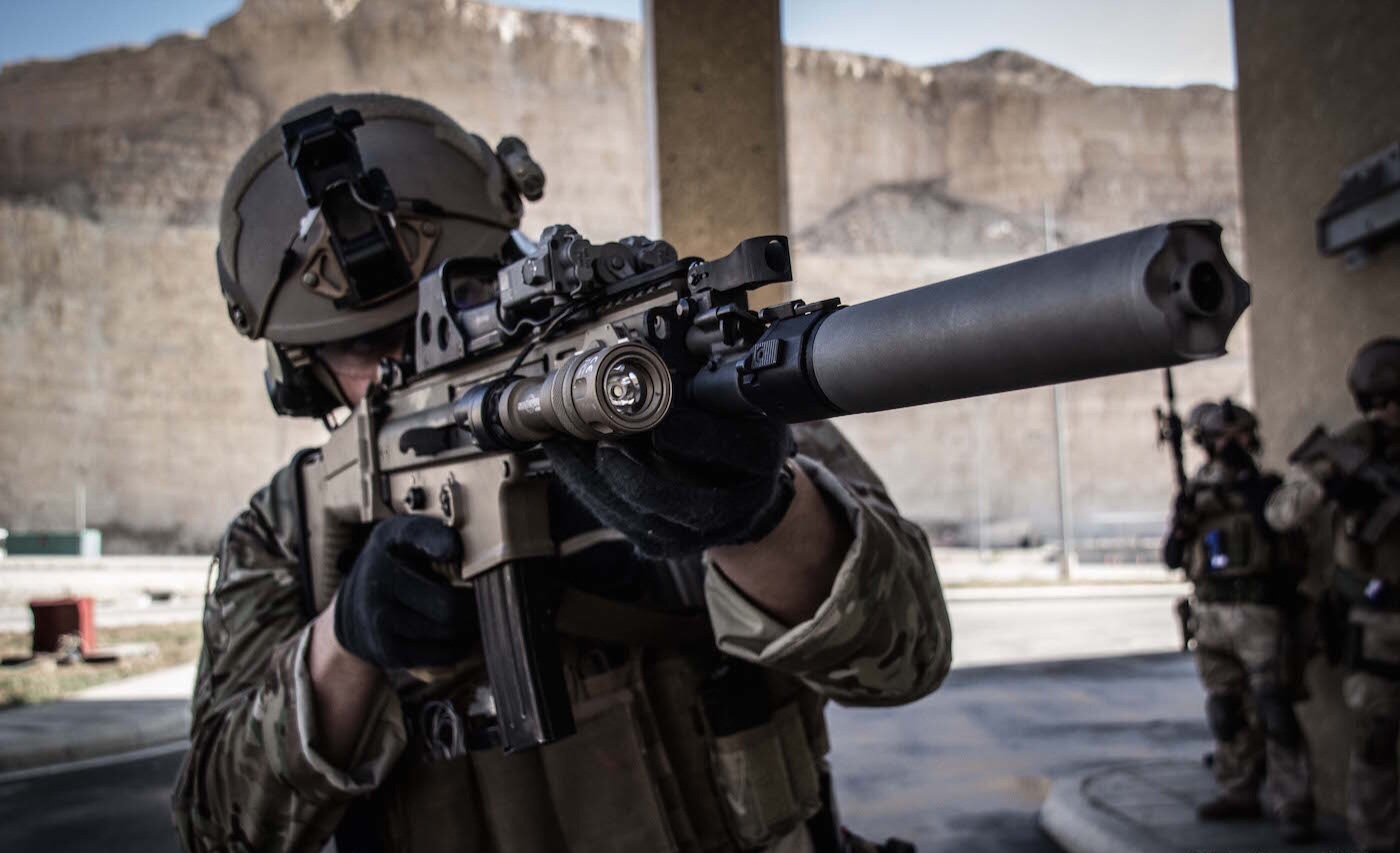
Belgian Special Forces Group operator with the SCAR rifle in Jordan, Nov. 2014

In January 1942, the first Belgian parachutists were trained at RAF Ringway, Manchester, England. The same year, the Belgian Independent Parachute Company was established and commanded by Captain E. Blondeel. Later, the unit was incorporated into the Special Air Service Brigade and became the 5th Special Air Service (known as the Belgian SAS squadron). The SAS squadron was active during World War II until enemy operations ceased. They carried out several operations using the parachute regiment and armored jeeps. Thereafter, the unit also took part in counter-intelligence operations. On 21 September 1945, 5th SAS was transferred from the British Army to the newly reformed Belgian Army. Renamed the Regiment Parachutistes SAS, they served independently as a highly mobile airborne unit until 1952, when the regiment joined with the Commando Regiment to form a battalion of the Para-commando Regiment.

From 1952 on, the traditions of the 5th SAS were continued by 1st Paratroopers Battalion (1 PARA) of the Para-commando Regiment. In 1955, the ESR-SOE (Eléments Spéciaux de Recherche-Speciale Opsporings Elementen), translated as the Special Detection Unit, was created and included operators from all divisions of the Army. The unit was part of the 1st Belgian Corps, commanded by Captain J. BYL, and succeeded by Major R. Tagnon.

In 1961, the ESR-SOE was officially established with R. Tagnon as the first Corps commander. In 1964, under the command of P. Crèvecoeur, the unit changed its name. It became the first Company ESR-GVP (Equipes Spéciales de Reconnaissance-Gespecialiseerde VerkenningsPloegen), translated as the Specialized Reconnaissance Teams. The company was made up of team members from the Army and a Para-Commando detachment. They worked in conjunction with all the divisions as well as the I Corps (Belgium). The unit consisted of 16 teams of 4 operators and support members, for a total of about 120 men, and served in a stay-behind role. The unit was stationed in Weiden, then in Euskirchen, and finally in Spich until it was disbanded in 1994.

In 1994, the detachment LRRP (Long Range Reconnaissance Patrol) was established following the tradition of the 1st Company ESR-GVP. The LRRP was dependent on the Para-Commando brigade and was stationed in Heverlee until it was disbanded in 2000.

In April 2000, the Special Forces Group was established from the 3rd Regiment Lanciers Parachutistes and was moved to Flawinne. In February 2003, the Special Forces Group became an independent unit when the 3rd Regiment of Lanciers was disbanded. In 2011, amid defense cuts and the reorganization of the Belgian Armed Forces, 1 PARA was disbanded after 59 years of continuous service. In December 2011, the unit's banner, flag, insignia, and traditions were officially handed over to the Special Forces Group (SFG) to carry on the lineage of the 5th SAS and 1 Para. In 2012, the SFG moved to new barracks in Heverlee and became part of the Light Brigade.

On 3 July 2018, the Light Brigade disbanded, and the Special Operations Regiment (SOR) was inaugurated. The SOR consists of the following units: Special Forces Group (SFG), 2nd Commando Battalion (2 Codo), 3rd Paratroopers Battalion (3 PARA), Commando Training Centre (CE Cdo), Parachutist Training Centre (CE Para), and the 6th Group Communication and Information Systems (6 Gp CIS).

Since summer 2026, the members of the Special Forces Group - 5SAS bring back the SAS tradition in wearing the SAS shoulder title over their Dress Uniform to enforce identity and traditions.

== Organisation ==
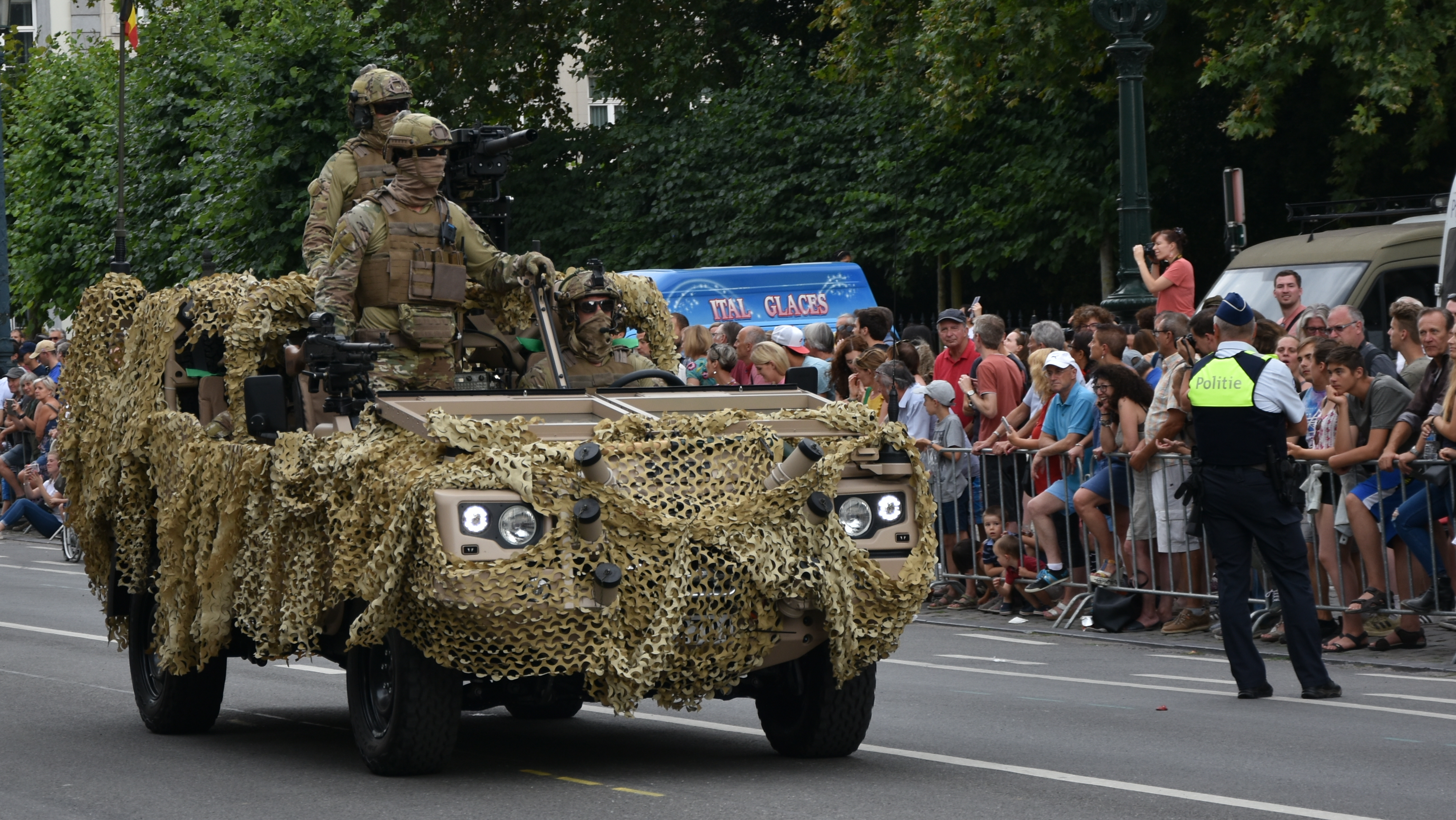
Jankel Fox Rapid Response Vehicles (RRV) of the Special Forces Group during a parade in 2018 in Brussels

The Special Forces Group - 5SAS Comprises;

- HQ staff
- Support staff and service's detachment with:
  - intelligence cell
  - communications cell
  - medical cell
  - logistics cell
- Operational detachment with:
  - training / instructional cell
  - 4 Air operations teams (HALO airborne / heliborne)
  - 2 Amphibious operations teams (Rebreather diver, watercraft, and advanced Amphibious capabilities)
  - 4 Land operations teams (Mobility, advanced mountain capabilities)

Note: A Team consists of a Team Officer, a Senior NCO (2IC), and 8 Operators.

== Training ==
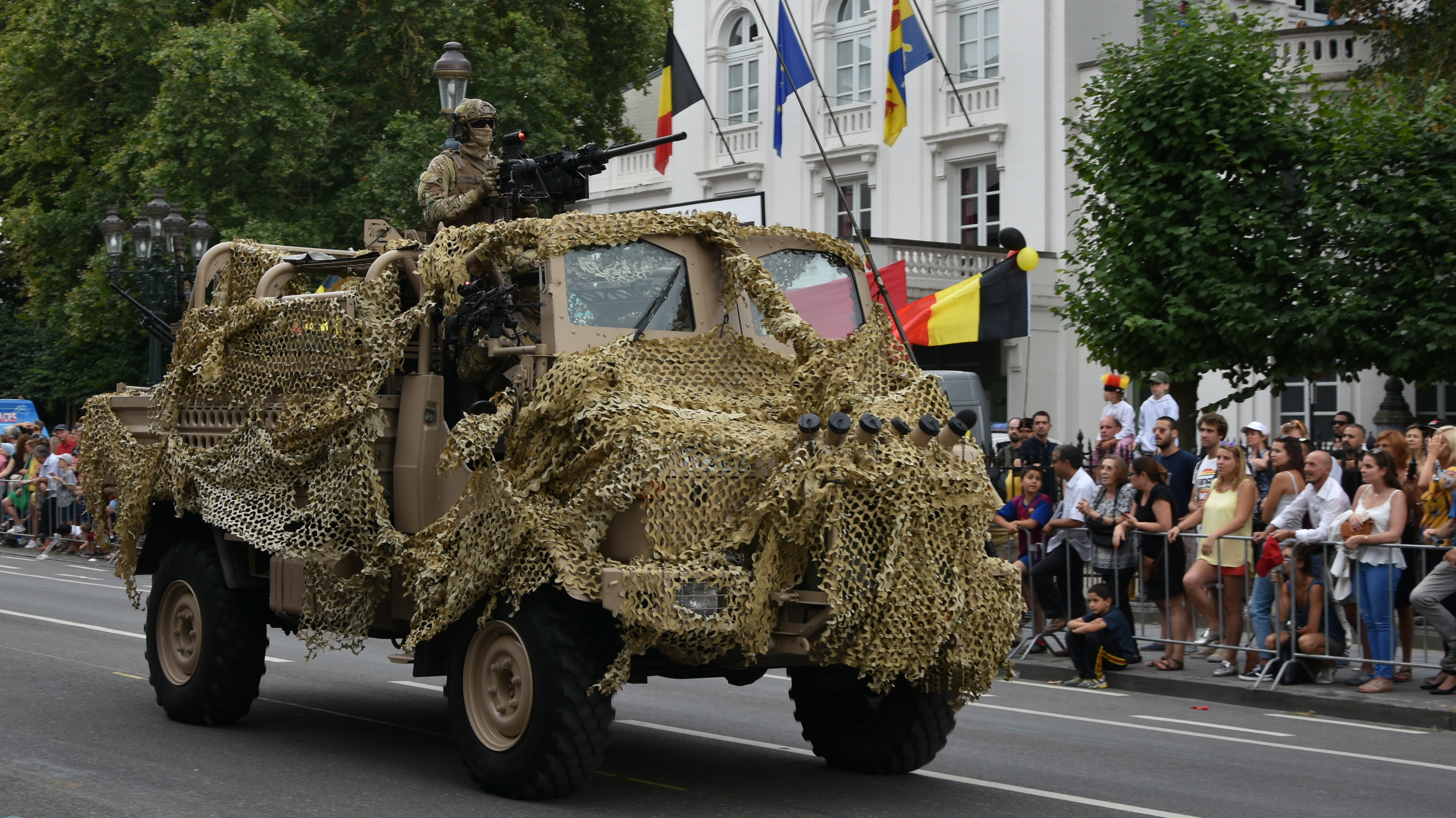
Unimog 1,9T 4×4 Jacam of the Special Forces Group during a parade in 2018 in Brussels

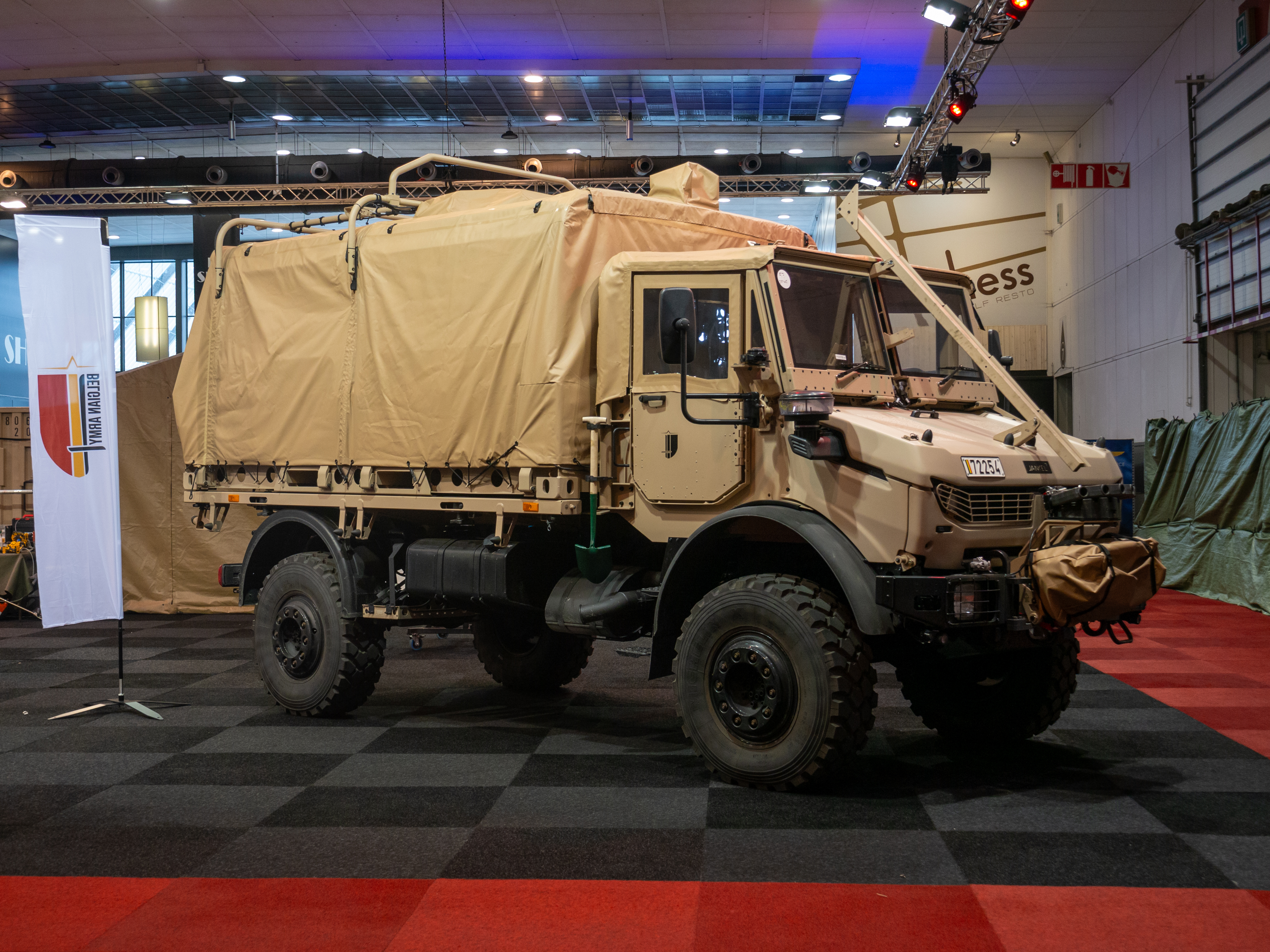
A Mercedes-Benz Unimog based 2022 model of Jankel LTTV in 2024 Brussels Auto Show

Qualification as a Special Forces Group operator consists of four parts: The selection phase (Pre-stage); the Qualification course (Stage); a complementary education course; a functional course.

=== Selection phase ===
The selection phase includes a selection week during which candidates are tested on their physical condition, map-reading ability, general military knowledge, and shooting techniques. A psychological evaluation is also performed. This is followed by a one-week specialized training program that focuses on reaching the basic level necessary to begin the actual stage. While many topics are covered, map reading and shooting techniques are emphasized. Finally, there is a one-week 'Identification of Military material' (IM) course.

=== Basic training ===
The extensive training program is physically and mentally challenging, lasting approximately 6 months. Aside from technical skills and military knowledge, candidates must meet high standards regarding initiative and motivation. During this phase, candidates are taught the basic skills necessary to survive hostile environments. The basic training consists of 3 phases: Orientation, Technical, and Tactical, each lasting about 2 months. After completing basic training, candidates may be called operators, although certification is not awarded until the end of the evaluation phase. The Orientation phase is physically intense and mainly an individual period. The emphasis during this phase is on map reading and independent work. The orientation phase is concluded with the 'Tenderfeet', an individual map reading exercise of more than 100 km within 48 hours.

Some of the areas covered during this phase are:

- Navigation and orientation
- Recognition and identification of military materials
- Specific Special Forces Tactics
- Shooting skills, supported by Blackbook (Peeters Cédric), in Brussels
- Survival skills
- Transmission/IT
- Physical training with the emphasis on endurance and resistance
- Medical techniques
- Close combat

The Technical phase is when the basic skills of an SF operator are taught. Some of the skills covered are:

- Radio equipment and procedures
- Amphibious insertion techniques
- Advanced shooting techniques
- Advanced combat medical techniques and procedures
- Military theory and tactics

The tactical phase consists of realistic exercises in which all aspects of possible missions are confronted. During this phase, candidates are exposed to severe mental and physical stress. This period is considered the actual stage or Q-course. The future operator learns to work behind enemy lines while being pursued by an opposing force (OPFOR). This phase emphasizes team dynamics; all candidates are evaluated in each function within the team.

The criteria:

All candidates must achieve 80% proficiency on all tests to complete each phase. Failure to meet these standards will result in sanctions or elimination. Honesty and loyalty are important requirements. Therefore, any candidate who is caught cheating will be returned to the unit and is barred from ever enrolling for candidacy. A candidate who must stop for medical reasons may enroll the following year, but a committee within the SFG determines the stage at which he may re-enter.

=== Complementary education ===
This phase lasts 12 months. During this phase, operators are given advanced training courses in areas such as High Altitude free fall (HA), Aidman, SOFAFR (Special Operations Forces Advanced First Responder), Détachement d'Agents de Sécurité (DAS), Special Forces Advanced Urban Combat (SFAUC), TSE/TEO (Tactical site Exploitation), TACP (Tactical Air Controller Party), Landing Point Commander, etc. Candidates who have not completed the Commando A and Para A qualification must do so to function as a Special Forces operator.

The Commando A Qualification Takes place in the commando-training center (CE Cdo) in Marche Les Dames in the province of Namur. During the 4-week program, candidates are trained in rock, amphibious, and commando techniques to cope with difficult terrain and circumstances, day and night.

The Para A Qualification It is given at the Para training center (CE Para) in Schaffen, near Diest. The four-week program consists of one week of ground training and three weeks of static line jumping from both balloons and airplanes (automatic opening).

Free-fall High Altitude (HA) This 5-week program takes place in Schaffen at the Para training center (CE Para). Basic free-fall skills are learned during the first two weeks. Over the last three weeks, candidates have learned to jump at night using the equipment used during tactical deployments. These jumps are executed from a maximal height of 12,000 feet. After successful completion of this training program, the candidates receive their Special Forces Operator certification. From that moment on, they were absorbed into an existing operational team and may be deployed on missions. This is the beginning of the functional training. Depending on the insertion specialty, operators are given advanced training and courses. New operators are assigned specialized roles within the teams (sniper, communications specialist, medic, or breacher).

=== Functional training ===
Free fall Very High Altitude (VHA): This is a 3-week course and requires completion of the HA course. This program takes place at the Para training center (CE Para) in Schaffen. This course specializes in parachute infiltration. These jumps are executed from a maximum altitude of 30,000 feet while wearing oxygen masks.

Combat Diver: This 5- to 8-month training program takes place in Zeebrugge at the diving school of the Belgian Navy. Here, candidates learn to dive using compressed air, non-autonomous diving, rebreathers with pure oxygen, and nitrogen-oxygen mix.

Instructor or Assistant Instructor Commando (O/HuO Cdo): This is an 8-week training program given at the Commando training center (CECdo). It consists of a 4-week course and a 4-week training program in which candidates learn to make installations using ropes and cables to cross vertical, horizontal, and wet obstacles. Candidates are also taught how to quickly and safely install many types of installations, such as climbing ropes, rope ladders, ferries, and death rides. They are also trained in evacuating injured individuals in rocky, difficult terrain.

Lead Climber: This 5-week training program teaches candidates to independently negotiate mountainous terrain on rocks, snow, and ice. They are trained to make trails to support combat units and to assist with crossings. They are technical advisors on missions in mountainous environments. Three weeks of training take place at the Commando training center (CE Cdo), and two weeks at Chamonix, France.

Training as an Operator of the Special Forces is an ongoing process. Operators are always involved in maintaining their skills and developing new ones. This is a fundamental part of an operator's life.

In real situations, the Special Forces have to perform reconnaissance and surveillance missions in small groups deep into enemy territory, conduct small-scale offensive actions to arrest or free people, or sabotage or impound materials. They are also trained to gain intelligence disguised as civilians.

== Capabilities ==
=== Ground mobility capabilities ===
Basic capabilities for all operators regardless of insertion specialty: Capable of navigating and operating on foot as well as on vehicles in all kinds of terrain (desert, jungle, arctic, mountains). Vehicles: SFG operators have the skills, knowledge, and training necessary for operating diverse vehicles. Tactical procedures for mobilization and combat situations are routinely practiced.

- Tactical combat vehicles capable of traversing difficult terrain, with relatively large firepower, and heavy load-bearing capacity can be advantageous during SR (Special Reconnaissance) missions. These attributes allow operators to be relatively independent in possible deployment areas.
- Specialized armored vehicles used to provide security to VIPs and VVIPs in high-risk territories require the use of specific adapted procedures. Operating in civilian environments presents unique challenges to team members. These types of assignments are possible during DAS (Détachement d'Agence de sécurité), i.e., bodyguarding missions, as well as during CPT (Close Protection Team) missions.
- Training to become a DAS agent requires successful completion of a specialized driving course. Some of the skills covered in this program include offensive and defensive driving, off-road driving, and drift and braking techniques.

Mountain:

- Infiltration and exfiltration in mountainous terrains in summer as well as in winter conditions. This requires experience and knowledge in orientation, meteorology, and mountaineering. This type of environment, with often harsh winter conditions, requires training with specialized equipment, as well as tactical skills and knowledge of the communication possibilities and limitations specific to mountain terrain. Traversing on skis during the night with heavy loads is not unusual for an SF operator.
- Execution of SR, MA, and DA missions as described in the main tasks of the unit. These missions must be executed regardless of terrain and weather conditions. Every team member must earn a commando badge from the Commando Training Center located in Marche-les-Dames. With this as a base, extra training in rock climbing, rappelling, and traversing over difficult terrain in tactical situations is essential.
- Tactical Urban Climbing (TUC) is a specialized training program where the advanced skills necessary for climbing and rappelling on buildings are learned.

Advanced Mountain capabilities Only for members of a Mountain team:

- Execution of missions in high altitudes where extensive technical knowledge and training are required. All team members are trained as commando instructors, and each team has at least two lead climbers with knowledge of meteorology, avalanches, orientation, technical equipment, rope techniques, and ice climbing. These skills make it possible to access remote areas. A high level of skiing is essential for mobility and deployment in high altitudes. To achieve and maintain this, each year these members spent several weeks in the mountains.

Mountain team members can be deployed as reinforcements or technical support to other teams during missions, training, and exercises in mountainous or TUC situations. The mountain team members have access to various courses abroad, such as skiing courses in AUT and FRA, as well as summer and winter rescue courses.

=== Air insertion and extraction capabilities ===
Basic Air insertion and extraction capabilities for all operators regardless of insertion specialty:

- Rotary wing (Helicopter): Fast-rope, spy-rig, rappel, and touch-and-go are the most common means of insertion for Special Operations Forces. Helicopters offer many advantages. They can be used in many weather conditions, in limited landing zones, and for CASEVAC (Casualty Evacuation); they are highly maneuverable and can provide extra firepower.
- Fixed wing, fast landing attack.
- Static line parachuting up to 1,000 feet.
- Free-fall: (up to 15,000 ft), both HAHO (High Altitude – High Opening) and HALO (High Altitude – Low Opening). This insertion method offers tactical advantages by providing a large action radius and flexibility.

Advanced Air Insertion Only for members of an air team: The members of an air team are rigorously trained in parachute navigation, precision landings, and tactical jumps, as well as helicopter handling.

- Very High Altitude free fall (VHA): approximately 25000 ft; Requires an additional medical profile because the crew and the jumpers rely on special equipment to provide oxygen during the flight. This type of deployment, from thin air, has distinct tactical advantages. The high dropping altitude enables operators to infiltrate long distances very discreetly.

=== Amphibious capabilities ===
Basic amphibious capabilities for all operators, regardless of insertion specialty: During the Q course, all candidates are taught basic surface-water maneuvering skills. The exercises are designed, using tactical scenarios, to develop the SF candidates' skills in using specialized equipment, procedures, and techniques. Operational team members typically develop these skills:

- River crossing: Crossing streams and/or rivers using only what is at hand.
- Surface infiltration: Swimming over long distances using flippers, diving masks, snorkels, and neoprene suits. Sensitive equipment can be taken along in watertight bags.
- Kayak: Light and collapsible kayaks for tactical infiltration over long distances.
- Semi-rigid rubber boats: Allow rapid movement over long distances and allow teams to navigate against tides.
- RHIB (Rigid-Hulled Inflatable Boat): high-performance and high-capacity boats that allow very fast movement for anti-piracy, boarding, anti-drug operations, and Maritime Interdiction Operations.

Advanced amphibious capabilities: Only for members of a Sea team: Sea teams are trained as combat divers and can be deployed as such. The 8-month diving course teaches diving techniques, including compressed-air, non-autonomous, oxy, and nitrox mixes. Deployment of combat divers:

- Tactical diving using a rebreather. This technique allows a team to maneuver undetected for reconnaissance and sabotage missions.
- Divers can be deployed to support other teams by carrying out beach, harbor, and close target reconnaissances, providing security as well as supporting boarding operations where non-sea team members perform amphibious activities.
- Underwater tasks (e.g., sabotage, demolition).

== The primary tasks of the unit ==
Special operations are military activities conducted by specially designated, organized, selected, trained, and equipped forces using unconventional techniques and modes of employment. These activities may be conducted across the full range of military activities to achieve their objective. Politico-military considerations may require discreet or covert techniques and the acceptance of a degree of political, military, or physical risk not associated with conventional operations. (MC437/2)

=== Special Reconnaissance (SR) ===
SR is an activity conducted by SOF to support the collection of a commander's Priority Intelligence Requirements (PIR) by employing unique capabilities. These activities may vary widely, from traditional 'eyes on target' surveillance in high-risk environments to other actions that may include, but are not limited to: human intelligence (HUMINT) collection, close target reconnaissance, or the employment of ISR assets.

=== Direct Action (DA) ===
DA is a precise offensive operation conducted by SOF, limited in scope and duration, to seize, destroy, disrupt, capture, exploit, recover, or damage high-value or high-payoff targets. DA differs from conventional offensive actions in the level of risk, techniques employed, and the degree of precision utilized to achieve a specific effect.

=== Military assistance (MA) ===
MA is a broad range of activities that support and influence critical friendly assets through training, advising, mentoring, or conducting combined operations. The range of MA is thus considerable and includes, but is not limited to, capability-building of friendly security forces, engagement with local, regional, and national leadership or organizations, and civic actions that support and influence the local population. SOF conducts MA within its field of expertise.

== Weapons ==
- FN SCAR-L CQC, assault rifle caliber: 5.56×45mm NATO
- FN SCAR-H CQC, battle rifle caliber: 7.62×51mm NATO
- FN Five-seveN, semi-automatic pistol caliber: 5.7×28mm
- FN Minimi, light machine gun caliber: 5.56×45mm NATO and 7.62×51mm NATO
- FN MAG, medium machine gun caliber: 7.62×51mm NATO, being replaced by FN Minimi in 7.62×51mm NATO
- FN P90 TR, submachine gun caliber: 5.7×28mm
- FN SLP MK I Tactical, shotgun caliber: 12-gauge
- FN SCAR-H TPR, marksman rifle caliber: 7.62×51mm NATO
- Accuracy International AXMC, sniper rifle caliber: .338 Lapua Magnum
- Barrett M107A1, anti-material rifle caliber: 12.7×99mm NATO
- Browning M2HB QCB, heavy machine gun caliber: 12.7×99mm NATO, mounted on Jankel FOX RRV and Unimog 1.9T 4×4 JACAM
- Heckler & Koch GMG, automatic grenade launcher, caliber: 40×46mm NATO, mounted on Jankel FOFOX RRV and Unimog 1.9T 4×4 JACAM
