= Para Commandos =

Para Commandos are military units whose members are both paratroopers and commandos

Examples include:

- Parachute Commando Regiments (Algeria)
- Para Commando Brigade (Bangladesh)
  - 1st Para-Commando Battalion
  - 2nd Para-Commando Battalion
- Special Operations Regiment (Belgium)
  - 2nd Commando (Paracommando) Battalion
  - 3rd Paratroopers (Paracommando) Battalion
- Para-Commando Battalion (Cambodia) (Historical)
- Para Commandos (India)
- Kopassus (Indonesia), including Group 1 Para Commandos and Group 2 Para Commandos
- Kopasgat Indonesia. Indonesian Air Forces both Paratrooper and Commandos, referred as Parakomando
- Special Operations Command parachute team (United States), also called the Para-Commandos
- Afghan Commando Forces, also referred to as Para-Commandos.
