= Special Operations Regiment (Belgium) =

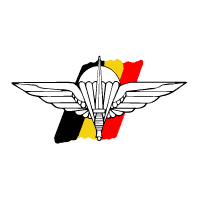
- Founded: 1952; 3 July 2018 (current form)
- Country: Belgium
- Branch: Belgian Land Component
- Type: Special operations
- Size: 1,500 soldiers
- Headquarters: Heverlee, Belgium
- Mottos: "Far ahead", "Who Dares Wins"
- Colors

Commanders
- Current commander: Colonel Linotte Frédéric

Insignia
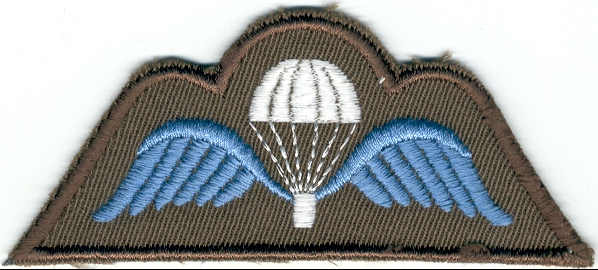
- Parachute Qualification Brevet

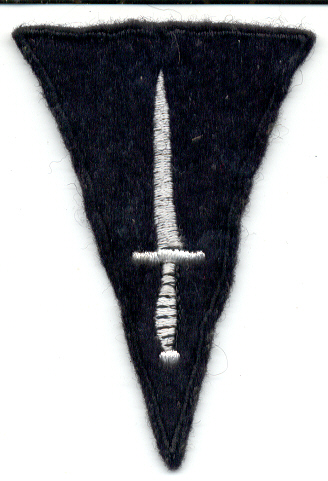
- Commando Qualification Brevet

The Special Operations Regiment is a special operations force of the Belgian Army of the Belgian Armed Forces. Its headquarters is located in Heverlee. It was known as the Light Brigade until 3 July 2018 when it was renamed and transformed into its current form.

== History ==
During the Second World War, parachutist and commando units were founded in Great Britain. In January 1942 the first Belgian parachutists were trained at RAF Ringway, Manchester, England, to serve in the No. 10 (Inter-Allied) Commando. The same year, the Belgian Independent Parachute Company was established and commanded by Captain Eddy Blondeel.

Later, the unit was incorporated into Britain's Special Air Service Brigade and became the 5th Special Air Service (known as the Belgian SAS squadron). The SAS squadron was active during World War II until enemy activities were discontinued. They performed several operations using the parachute regiment and armoured jeeps. Thereafter, the unit also took part in counter-intelligence operations.

On 21 September 1945 5th SAS was transferred from the British Army to the newly reformed Belgian Army. Renamed as the Regiment of Parachutists SAS, they served independently as a highly mobile airborne unit until 1952. That year, the parachutist and commando units were brought together to form the Para Commando Regiment. Later, an antitank company, a field artillery battery and a reconnaissance squadron were added to the regiment.

In 1991, the regiment became the Para-Commando Brigade by adding new support units. In 2003, the Para Commando units (1st Paratroopers Battalion, 3rd Paratroopers Battalion, 2nd Commando Battalion) together with the 12/13th Battalion of the Line formed the new Light Brigade. It was stationed in Marche-en-Famenne.

On 3 July 2018 the Light Brigade was transformed into the Special Operations Regiment and its headquarter moved to Heverlee. The regiment consists of the two remaining Para-commando battalions (3rd Para, 2nd Commando), the Special Forces Group, the 6th Group CIS, the training centre for parachutists and the training centre for commandos. The 12/13th Battalion of the Line was transferred to the Motorized Brigade.

The Para-commando battalions work closely with the Belgian Air Force's 15th Air Transport Wing, who operate the Lockheed C-130 Hercules transport aircraft.

== Organisation ==
Special Operations Regiment locations
- Special Operations Regiment, in Marche-en-Famenne.
  - Headquarters and Staff Company, carrying the traditions of the 4th Commando Battalion, in Heverlee
  - Special Forces Group, carrying the traditions of the 1st Paratroopers Battalion, in Heverlee
  - 2nd Commando Battalion, in Flawinne
  - 3rd Paratroopers Battalion, in Tielen
  - 6th Communication and Information Systems Group, in Peutie
  - Paratroopers Training Centre, at Schaffen Air Base
  - Commando Training Centre, in Marche-les-Dames

== Other units with Para Commandos ==
Other units personnel from the Belgian Armed Forces that support the 2nd Commando Battalion and 3rd Paratrooper Battalion, who as well as their primary trade have to complete the Para commandos "A" certificate training and in so doing, earn their Parachutists and Commando Brevets. Some of these units are currently in the process of being integrated into the new SOR (Special Operations Regiment) structure and as such will no longer be dependent upon the non-paracommando HQ of their former unit.

- Artillery Battalion selected members of:
  - Joint Fires Observer (Land Air Integration) battery;
  - Mortar battery (Qualified members of both batteries wear a Sherwood green beret with Artillery badge).
- 11th Engineer Battalion
  - Light combat engineers company (68th Company) (wear a Sherwood green beret with Engineers badge)
- 14th Medical Battalion of the Belgian Medical Service
  - Medical (Special Operations Regiment) company (wear a maroon beret with unique Para Commando Medical badge)
- Logistics (Maintenance / Repair, Transportation and Supply) personnel attached to units within or support the Special Operations Regiment (wear a Sherwood green beret with special operations regiments badge).
