= Para-Commando Brigade =

Paracommando Regiment (1952–1991) Paracommando Brigade (1991–2003) Light Brigade (2003–2018) Special Operations Regiment (2018–present)
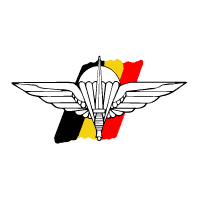
- Belgian SOR Logo
- Active: 1952–present
- Country: Belgium
- Branch: Belgian Land Component
- Type: Special operations forces
- Part of: Brigade
- Garrison/HQ: Heverlee
- Colors
- Engagements: Congo Crisis 1960; Operation Red Dragon/Black Dragon; Battle of Kolwezi; UNOSOM I UNITAF; UNOSOM II; UNAMIR; KFOR; ISAF

Commanders
- Current commander: Colonel Tom Bilo

The Para-Commando Brigade was a special force brigade of the Belgian Army, consisting of two paracommando battalions, the Special Forces Group and a support unit of the Communication & Information Systems Group. In 2003, its name was changed to the Light Brigade. On 3 July 2018, the Light Brigade was renamed and transformed into the Special Operations Regiment.

== History ==
During the Second World War, parachutist and commando units were founded in Great Britain. In 1942, the first Belgian commandos started training to serve in the No. 10 (Inter-Allied) Commando. Also that year, some Belgian soldiers underwent parachute training. These paras served in the Belgian 5th Special Air Service which was under the command of the famous Eddy Blondeel. Both units executed numerous raids and important missions.

In 1952, these parachutist and commando units were brought together in a Para-Commando Regiment. Later, an antitank company, a field artillery battery and a reconnaissance squadron were added. In November 1991, the Para-Commando Regiment became a brigade by adding new support units. By 2003, the Para Commando Brigade was disbanded.

In 2003, The Para-Commando units (1st Parachute Battalion, 3rd Parachute Battalion and 2nd Commando Battalion) formed the new 'Light Brigade'.

In 2018, the Light Brigade was transformed into the Special Operations Regiment. The regiment consists of the two remaining Para-Commando battalions (3Para, 2Commando), the Special Forces Group (Belgium), a support unit of the Communication & Information Systems Group, the training centre for Parachutists and the training centre for Commandos. The 12/13th Battalion of the Line was transferred to the Motorized Brigade (Belgium).

The Paracommando battalions work closely with the Belgian Air Force's 15th Transportation Wing, who operate the Lockheed C-130 Hercules transport aircraft.

== Operations in Africa ==
From 1953, the commandos participated actively in the "African period" with numerous detachments destined for the base at Kamina (BAKA) in the Belgian Congo. After the riots of January 4, 1959, the 2nd Commando Battalion was dispatched urgently to Léopoldville where it was stationed for about a month. A cadre party and other elements later formed the 4th Commando Bataillon which was stationed at Kitona in Bas-Congo.

=== Congo ===
The regiment saw repeated action during the Congo Crisis of the 1960s. In July 1960, 3,000 para-commandos and five independent reserve companies intervened in a number of Congolese cities to facilitate the evacuation of Europeans and the disarmament of Armee Nationale Congolaise mutineers.

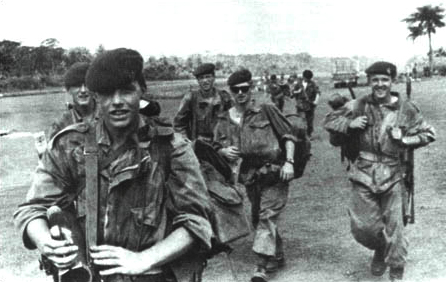
Paracommando's of the 1st Parachute Battalion in action during Operation Dragon Rouge

The Simba Rebellion began in 1964 in the Kivu and Orientale regions of the Congo. In August 1964, Congolese government forces were making general headway against the rebels. Sensing defeat, rebel forces took hostages from the local white population. Several hundred were taken to Stanleyville and closely guarded in the Victoria Hotel. Congolese authorities turned to the Belgian and the United States governments for assistance. After failed negotiations, the Belgians responded by sending a task-force led by Colonel Charles Laurent, airlifted by five C-130s provided by the U.S. 322nd Airlift Division.

On 24 November 1964, with the operation Dragon Rouge, five US Air Force C-130 transports dropped 350 paratroopers of the Para-Commando Regiment onto the airfield at Stanleyville. Once the paratroopers had secured the airfield and cleared the runway, they made their way to the Victoria Hotel. The Simbas were prevented from killing all but some 80 of the hostages. Over the next two days over 1,800 American and Europeans, and 400 Congolese were evacuated.

The regiment later saw action at Kolwezi during Shaba II in 1978, where they evacuated about 2,000 expats and took part in the Battle of Kolwezi to liberate the city from rebels. They also evacuated European citizens during Operation Blue Beam in September 1991, and during Operation Green Stream in March 1997.

=== Somalia ===
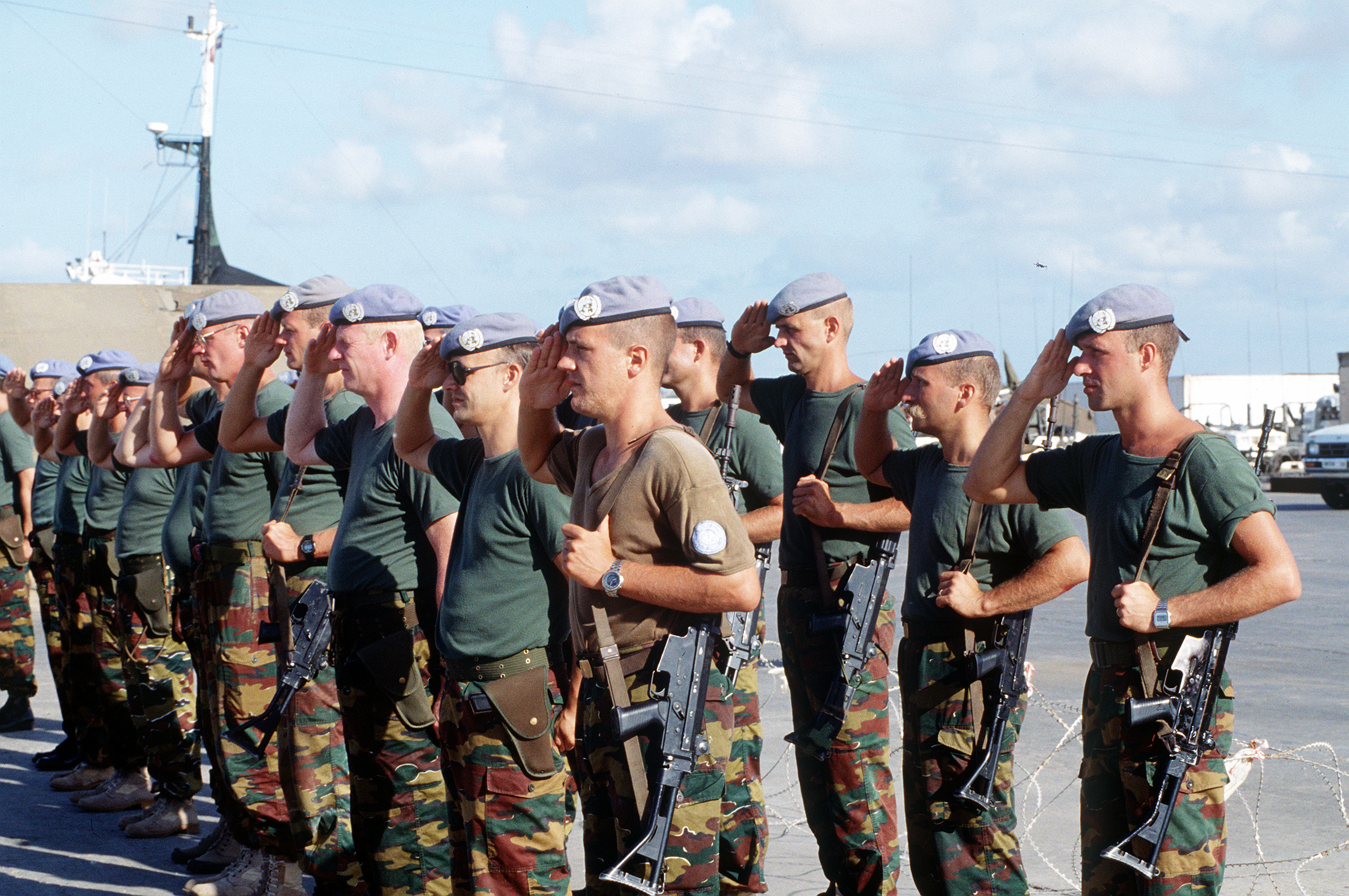
Paracommando's In Somalia in 1993

From 1992 to 1993, all three battalions were deployed to Somalia as part of UNITAF (1st Battalion), UNOSOM I (2nd Battalion) and UNOSOM II (3rd Battalion).

== Other operations ==
In late November, 1985, around 1,000 Paracommandos comprising six companies of the 2nd Commando and 3rd Parachute Battalions were deployed to man static and mobile security posts around government buildings in Brussels, amidst a then-ongoing terrorist campaign by the Far-left Communist Combatant Cells (this being during a relatively violent period of militant and criminal activity in Belgian history; Les Années de plomb). The group had raided a Belgian Army barracks and stolen battle rifles, wounded a soldier, killed two firemen and wounded 13 civilians in a series of attacks. Concerns also arose due to an upcoming visit by US President Ronald Reagan.

Elements of the 3rd Para Battalion were deployed to Iran in 1991 to help Kurdish refugees fleeing from Iraq following the Gulf War.

Elements of the Brigade have also been deployed to Kosovo as part of KFOR (since 1999) and to Afghanistan as part of ISAF (since 2002).

== Reformation 2003 ==
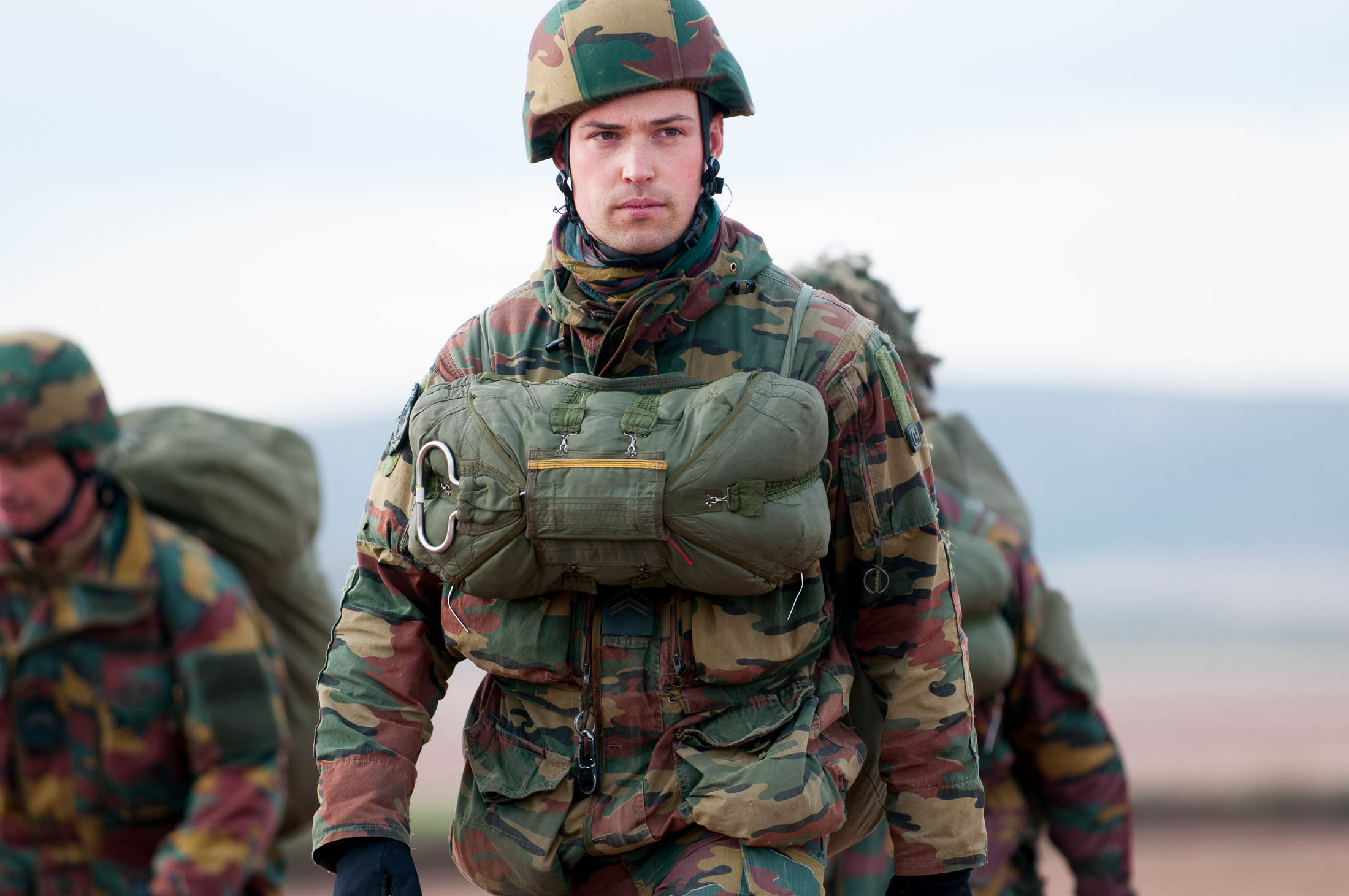
Paracommandos of 2nd Commando Battalion, during an airborne operation at Trident Juncture 2015

Previously known as Paracommando Brigade, the Light Brigade had grouped all personnel into three airborne infantry battalions, except for the independent support units that are typically part of a brigade structure. These support units were re-attached to regular battalions, but retained some airborne capacity. The Light Brigade had its headquarters in Heverlee. The three remaining airborne infantry battalions were located as follows:

- 1 Paratroop Battalion in Diest (disbanded on 1 July 2011 and its two companies distributed between the other two battalions)
- 2nd Commando Battalion in Flawinne
- 3rd Parachute Battalion in Tielen

The 2nd and 3rd battalion currently exist within the Light Brigade. Although these battalions refer to themselves as either commando or paratroopers, recruits have received the same training and perform the same duties. Individual battalion traditions cause units to have different designators, beret colours and insignia. 2nd Commando Battalion wear green berets in reference to their connection to the 4th (Belgian) Troop of No.10 Commando. 3rd Parachute Battalion wear maroon berets.

== Reformation 2018 ==
On 3 July 2018, the Light Brigade was renamed and transformed into the Special Operations Regiment.
