= Para-Commando Anti-tank Company =

Paracommando ATk Company
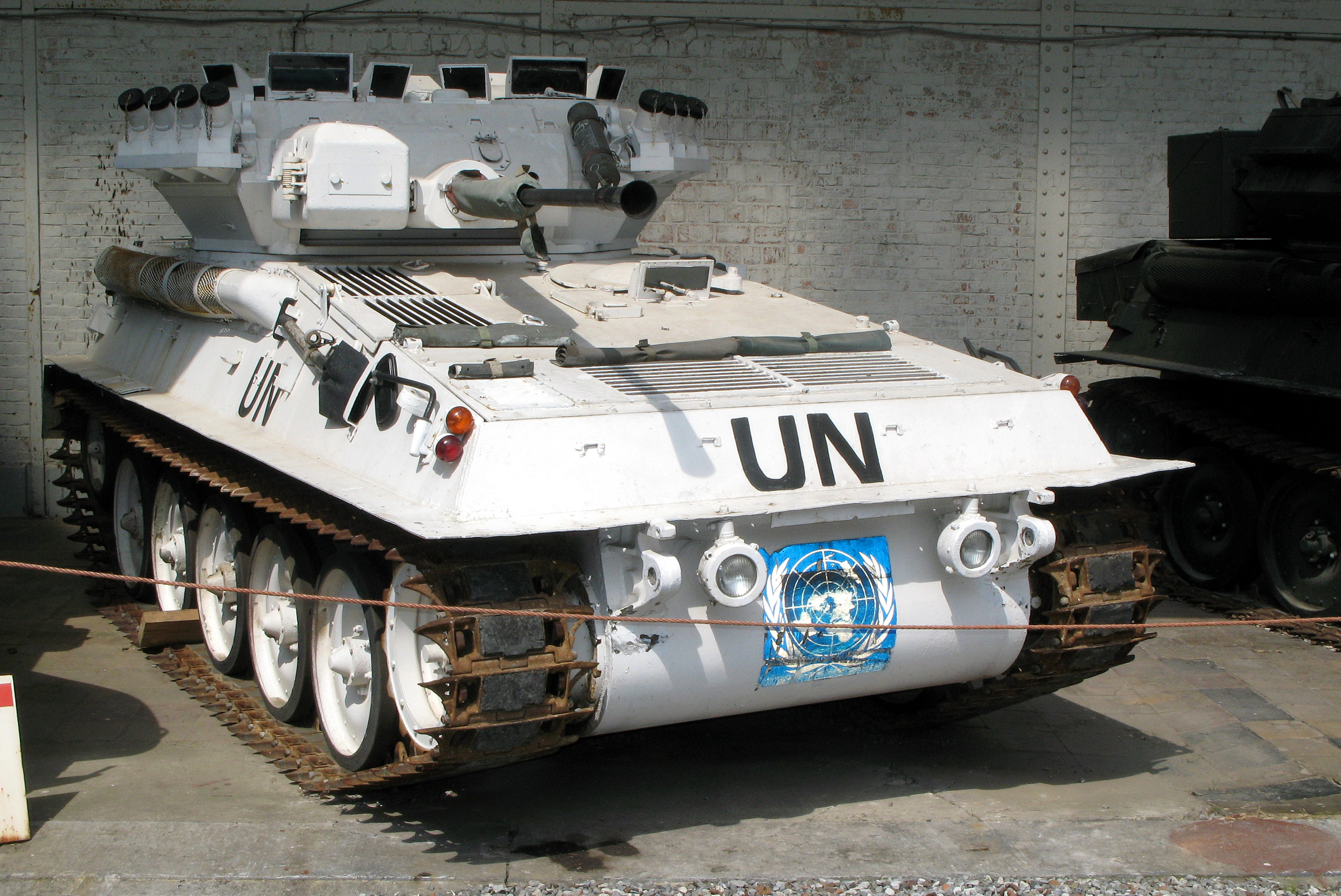
- A CVR(T) Scorpion of the ATk Company in the UN colours used in Somalia.
- Active: 1963-1994
- Country: Belgium
- Branch: Land Component
- Type: Airborne anti-tank forces
- Size: Company
- Part of: Para-Commando Brigade
- Garrison/HQ: Flawinne

The Para-commando Anti-Tank Company (French: Compagnie Antitank Para-Commando, Dutch: Antitankcompagnie Paracommando), usually shortened to ATk Company was an airborne anti-tank forces company of the Belgian Army and part of the Para-Commando Brigade, which specialized in airborne operations, anti-tank warfare, artillery observer, combat patrol, long-range penetration, maneuver warfare, patrolling, and special reconnaissance. In 1994, it was merged with the 3rd Lancers Squadron to form the 3rd Parachute Lancers Regiment.

== Formation ==
The ATk Company was formed on March 1, 1963, in the barracks of 2nd Commando Battalion at Flawinne. The company was initially equipped with French-made ENTAC missiles mounted on Jeeps, but in 1979 received new MILAN missiles.

- A Staff of the Company
- THREE Platoons, A, B & C with:
  - TWO sections with each:
    - TWO gun posts on Jeeps:
      - (Non-commissioned) officer
      - Guner
      - Supplier

== Operations ==
=== Somalia ===
As part of the UNOSOM II mission in Somalia, the ATk Company, equipped with CVR(T) Scorpion tanks, played a significant role in the mission's success. As a United Nations mission, all vehicles were painted white with the Belgian tricolor on the side. The ATk Company was based in the region of Jilib for the duration of its mission from 4 August 1993 to 24 December 1993.

== Disbandment ==
Only one month after returning from Operation Silver Back in Rwanda, the Paracommando ATk Company was amalgamated with the 3rd Squadron of Parachute Lancers to form the 3rd Parachute Lancers Regiment on May 27, 1994. This move was made as part of the restructuring of the Paracommando Regiment to Paracommando Brigade.
