= 4th Commando Battalion (Belgium) =

4th Commando Battalion (1959–1962) 4th (Reserve) Commando Battalion (c. 1970–1979)
- Active: 1959–62 c. 1970–79
- Country: Belgium
- Branch: Belgian Land Component
- Type: Commando
- Size: Battalion
- Part of: Para-Commando Brigade
- Garrison/HQ: Kitona, Belgian Congo (1959–60); Kisenyi, Rwanda-Urundi (1960–62)
- Engagements: Congo Crisis

The 4th Commando Battalion (French: 4e Bataillon Commando, Dutch: 4de Bataljon Commando) was a one of four airborne forces battalion unit of the Belgian Land Component and part of the Para-Commando Brigade. It is based in the Belgian colonies of Congo and Rwanda-Urundi between 1959 until its disbandment in 1962, following the independence of Belgium's last African colony. In the 1970s, the unit was revived as 4th (Reserve) Commando Battalion before it was finally disbanded in 1979.

== Background ==
In 1959, the 2nd Commando Battalion had been deployed to the Belgian Congo to deal try to maintain order in the months leading up to independence. However, it soon became clear that these forces would not be sufficient. Realising this, the 4th Commando Battalion was formed, from 2nd Commando Battalion officers and hastily trained conscripts.

4th Commando Battalion was created by Royal Decree (N.7397) by King Baudoin on 23 October 1959. The standard was presented to the unit on 1 April 1960.

== Operations in Congo and Rwanda-Urundi ==
4th Commando Battalion was established in the Congolese town of Kitona in Bas-Congo. In April 1960, it was transferred to Rwanda-Urundi.

In Rwanda-Urundi, the 4th Commando Battalion was instrumental in keeping peace between the Hutu and Tutsi populations. Antipathy between these two groups had been growing since 1957, though would finally culminate in the Rwandan genocide of 1994.

From their base in Rwanda-Burundi, the battalion was also mobilized for operations in nearby towns in the Congo. In July 1960, the unit was sent to Goma to seize the airfield and one company was parachuted into Bunia to free hostages. Three Belgians were killed in this operation. In January 1961, a company of the battalion repelled an attack by the Congolese National Army on the town of Goma, losing one soldier.

On the independence of Rwanda and Burundi, there was no longer possible to maintain an elite unit in Africa, and 4th Commando Battalion was though surplus to requirements. It was disbanded on 1 October 1962.

== 4th (Reserve) Commando Battalion ==
In the early 1970s, the 4th Commando Battalion was reactivated, comprising trained, reserve soldiers previously incorporated into other Para-Commando units.

The Headquarters of the Special Operations Regiment, based in Marche-en-Famenne until 2018, created in January 2011, maintains the traditions and standard of the 4th Commando Battalion, which were previously held by the Commando Training Centre.
