= 5th Special Air Service =

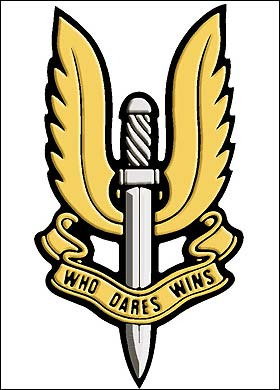
- Crest and Cap Badge of the 5th Special Air Service
- Active: February 1941 – 21 September 1945
- Country: Belgium
- Type: Special forces
- Size: One squadron (until early 1945); One regiment (from March 1945)
- Part of: Free Belgian Forces
- Garrison/HQ: Malvern Wells; Loudon Castle Camp; Tervuren
- Motto: Who Dares Wins
- March: Quick: Marche des Parachutistes Belges; Slow: Lili Marlene
- Battle honours: Normandy – Belgium – Ardennes – Emden – Oldenburg; Fourragère of the Leopold Order; Fourragère of the French Croix de Guerre 1939–1945

Commanders
- Notable commanders: Lieutenant Colonel Eddy Blondeel

The 5th Special Air Service (5th SAS) was a Belgian special forces unit during World War II, made up entirely of Belgian volunteers. It saw action as part of the British SAS Brigade in Normandy, Northern France, Belgium, the Netherlands, and Germany. It was the first Allied unit to set foot on Belgian soil, and the first to cross the Siegfried Line, albeit accidentally.

== History ==
A Belgian Independent Parachute Company was officially founded at Malvern Wells (Worcestershire) on 8 May 1942 by Henri Rolin, the then-Belgian undersecretary for defence. It comprised the following:

- A Company, 2nd Battalion Belgian Fusiliers, a Battalion mainly made up of Belgian volunteers from South and North America organised after January 1941, who moved to Great Britain in June 1941. The entire company volunteered in February 1942 to train as an Independent Parachute Company under Lt. Freddy Limbosch as Chief Instructor.
- A platoon of the 1st Battalion Belgian Fusiliers with some qualified parachutists (since January 1942).
- Volunteers from other Belgian Forces units who had escaped occupied Belgium via France, Spain and Gibraltar.

The newly formed Company continued to train as an Independent Parachute Company, making extensive use of the schools and training facilities offered by the British (the first Parachutists wings worn by Belgians were earned at Ringway parachute school in early 1942).

The unit was attached for 3 months to the 8th Parachute Battalion of the 6th Airborne Division in 1943, then spent a month in intensive training in December 1943 at the Allied Training Centre Inverlochy Castle (Fort William), and finally in February 1944, at Loudon Castle Camp, near Galston (Ayrshire), joining the Special Air Service (S.A.S.) Brigade.

Like all military units and formations, the men came from all walks of life. The volunteers included a former world cycling champion, lawyers, farmers, labourers, lumberjacks, a circus acrobat, a professional wrestler and three barons. The commanding officer was a qualified engineer and dentist. The men who volunteered came from across the world to fight Nazis. Not all of them could even speak the same language. Some spoke French, some Dutch and others only English. These differences of upbringing, class, lifestyle and even language might have seemed problematic, but esprit de corps developed within the unit.

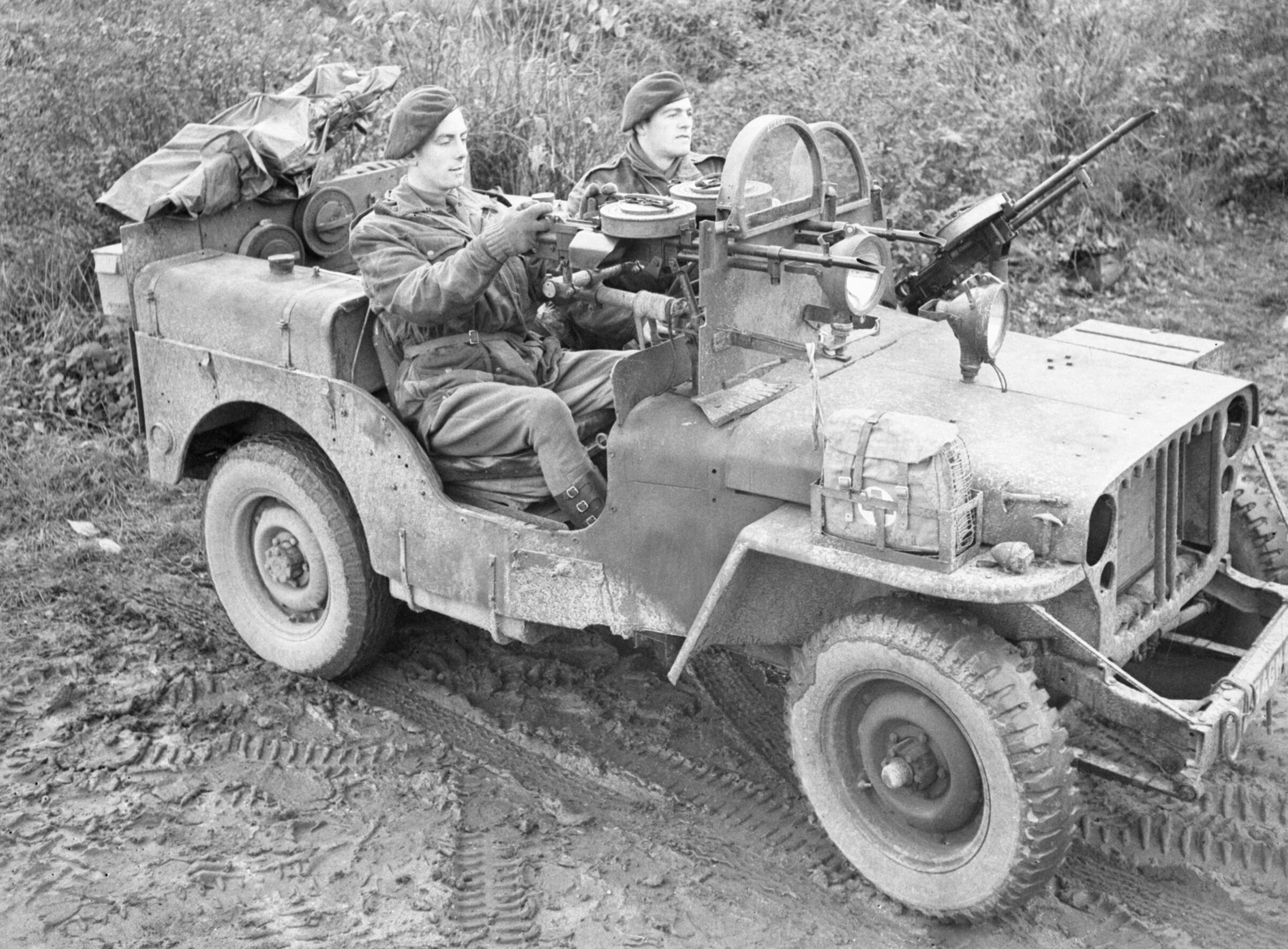
A SAS-modified and armed jeep, like those used by the 5th SAS towards the end of the war

The Belgian SAS parachutists' role during the Second World War was primarily sabotage, intelligence, and reconnaissance. The men saw their first action in late July 1944 in France. During the Ardennes offensive, the unit was regrouped and equipped with armoured jeeps. As a reconnaissance squadron, they executed security and reconnaissance missions in support of the 6th British Airborne Division. They did so during the Battle of Bure. In 1945, they were used for counter-intelligence work that involved the location and arrest of top-ranking Nazis and war criminals.

In the beginning of April 1945, the Belgian SAS Squadron consisted of three reconnaissance squads that deployed in the north of the Netherlands and in Germany. After the capitulation of Nazi Germany on 8 May 1945, the Belgian SAS participated in 'Counter Intelligence' missions in Germany and Denmark.

At the end of the war, the Belgian SAS Regiment was the first Allied unit to set foot in Belgium and Germany, and the only Belgian unit permanently on active deployment between July 1944 and May 1945. They took part in the capture of Admiral Doenitz and the government he now led in Flensburg, the German Foreign Minister Ribbentrop, and other senior Nazis.

== Insignia ==
SAS pattern parachute wings.

- The cap badge is a downward pointing flaming sword worked in cloth of a Crusader shield. It was designed by Corporal Robert Tait, MM and Bar, following the usual British Army practice of holding a competition to design the cap badge for a new unit. The competition was held after the close of Operation Crusader. The motto is Who Dares, Wins. The first commanding officer, David Stirling, approved it, but disallowed the proposed wording 'Descend to Defend' or 'Strike and Destroy'. The sword depicted is the Sword of Damocles
- The Maroon beret.
- The SAS pattern parachute wings were designed by Lieutenant Jock Lewes and based on the basic British Army design approved in 1940, but modified to reflect the Middle East origins of the new unit by the substitution of the stylised sacred ibis wings of Isis of Egyptian iconography depicted in the décor of Shepheard's Hotel in Cairo.

== Disbandment ==
On 21 September 1945, 5th SAS was transferred from the British Army to the newly re-formed Belgian Army. Renamed the 1st Regiment of Parachutists, they served independently as a mobile airborne unit until 1952, when the regiment joined with the Commando Regiment to form a battalion of the Para-Commando Brigade. From 1952 on the traditions of 5th SAS were continued by 1st Parachute Battalion (1 PARA) of the Para-Commando Brigade.

Amid defence cuts and reorganisation of the Belgian army, 1 PARA was disbanded in 2011 after 59 years of continuous service. In December 2010, the unit's banner, flag and insignia were officially handed over to the newly formed Special Forces Group (SFG).

The last veteran of 5th Special Air Service was Jaak Daemen from Leopoldsburg, who died in August 2022, aged 97.

== See also ==
- Belgium in World War II
- German occupation of Belgium during World War II
- List of SAS operations

== Bibliography ==
- Thomas, Nigel (1991). Foreign Volunteers of the Allied Forces, 1939–45. London: Osprey. ISBN 1-85532-136-X.
- Regner, Jules; Lefèvre, André; De Pierpont, Guy (1977). De geschiedenis van de Belgische regimenten parachutisten -- S.A.S. commando's en para-commando's. Brussels: G.O. & C. OCLC 71734205.
