= Blondeel =

Blondeel may refer to:

- Lancelot Blondeel (1498-1561), painter
- Eddy Blondeel, a Belgian SAS officer
