= 6th Group CIS =

Belgian Army communications unit (2002–)

6th Group Communication and Information Systems
- Active: 6 September 2002
- Country: Belgium
- Branch: Belgian Army
- Type: Special operations forces
- Part of: Special Operations Regiment
- Garrison/HQ: Vilvoorde
- Motto: Latin: Servio et Adjuvo

The 6th Group Communication and Information Systems (6 Gp CIS) is the communication and information systems unit of the Belgian Special Operations Regiment, providing CIS support to the regiment's operations and training. Based at Peutie, it traces its lineage to the 6th Transmission Company formed in Aachen in 1951 as part of the 6th Armoured Division. The present unit was formed in 2002 and integrated into the Special Operations Regiment in 2018.

== History ==
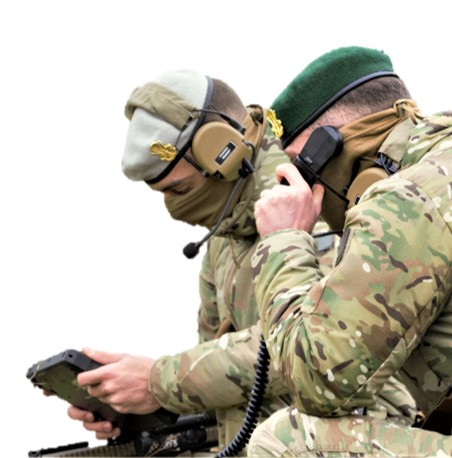
Special Operations Communicators

The origins of Belgium's military communications units date back to the First World War. In 1913, the fortified positions of Liège and Namur each received a telegraph company, marking the beginning of organised army signalling. At mobilisation in August 1914, a telegraph company was created for the fortified position of Antwerp, and eight telegraph sections were established for the Grand Quartier Général, (General Headquarter) the cavalry division and each of the six army divisions.

After the First World War, all transmission troops were grouped in one transmission regiment which counted 20,000 men in 1940. In 1939, with the reorganisation on the eve of World War II, the regiment of transmission troops was split into different units. 6 TTr was attached to the 6th Infantry Division.

After the Second World War, on May 21, 1951, the 6th Coy TTr saw the light of day in Aachen as a part of the 6th Armoured Division (The division was re-formed in May 1951 in the UK and later assigned to the British Army of the Rhine (BAOR)). Having been relocated several times in Germany - Belgian Forces in Germany (Aachen (May 1951 - September 1951 Tabora Kazerne), Bensberg (September 1951 - April 1960 Kwartier Diksmuide), Arnsberg (April 1960 - March 1969 Kwartier Reigersvliet) and finally Ludenscheid (March 1969 - July 1994 Kwartier De Leie)), the Coy finally becomes a battalion in December 1960. On March 9, 1962, the unit received its colors out of the hands of his Majesty King Baudouin of Belgium.

Consecutive reorganizations led to a redeploy to the Peutie's barracks in 1994, where the unit is merged with the Belgian signaling school to become the operational Coy there.

On Sep 6th, 2002 this Coy was split off from the school to form the nucleus of the unit as we know it today: the 6 Gp CIS. In the following years, the unit was reinforced with personnel from the 2nd Gp CIS and the 5th Gp CIS. The 6 Group Communication and Information Systems was integrated into the Special Operations Regiment in 2018. Its main role is to provide cyberwarfare and military communications support for operations, training, and special reconnaissance. It also supports Command and Control (C2) across the regiment.

== Coat of arms ==
The 6 Gp CIS, formerly 6 TTr, has kept in its coat of arms the pioneer's breastplate as a memento of the time that the Signaling-troops were still a part of the Engineer Corps. The azure and white background, inherited from the British Royal Corps of Signals, and the lightning in the breastplate refers to the Signaling arm.

The crossed lances with Belgian pennants, the Royal crown and the colors on the edges of the coat of arms, red and white, remember the attachment to the 6 Armoured Division since this division had inherited the traditions of the cavalry units. The motto ‘Servio et Adjuvo’ means: ‘I serve and I help’ and points at the mission the unit fulfills towards its command.

== Insignia ==
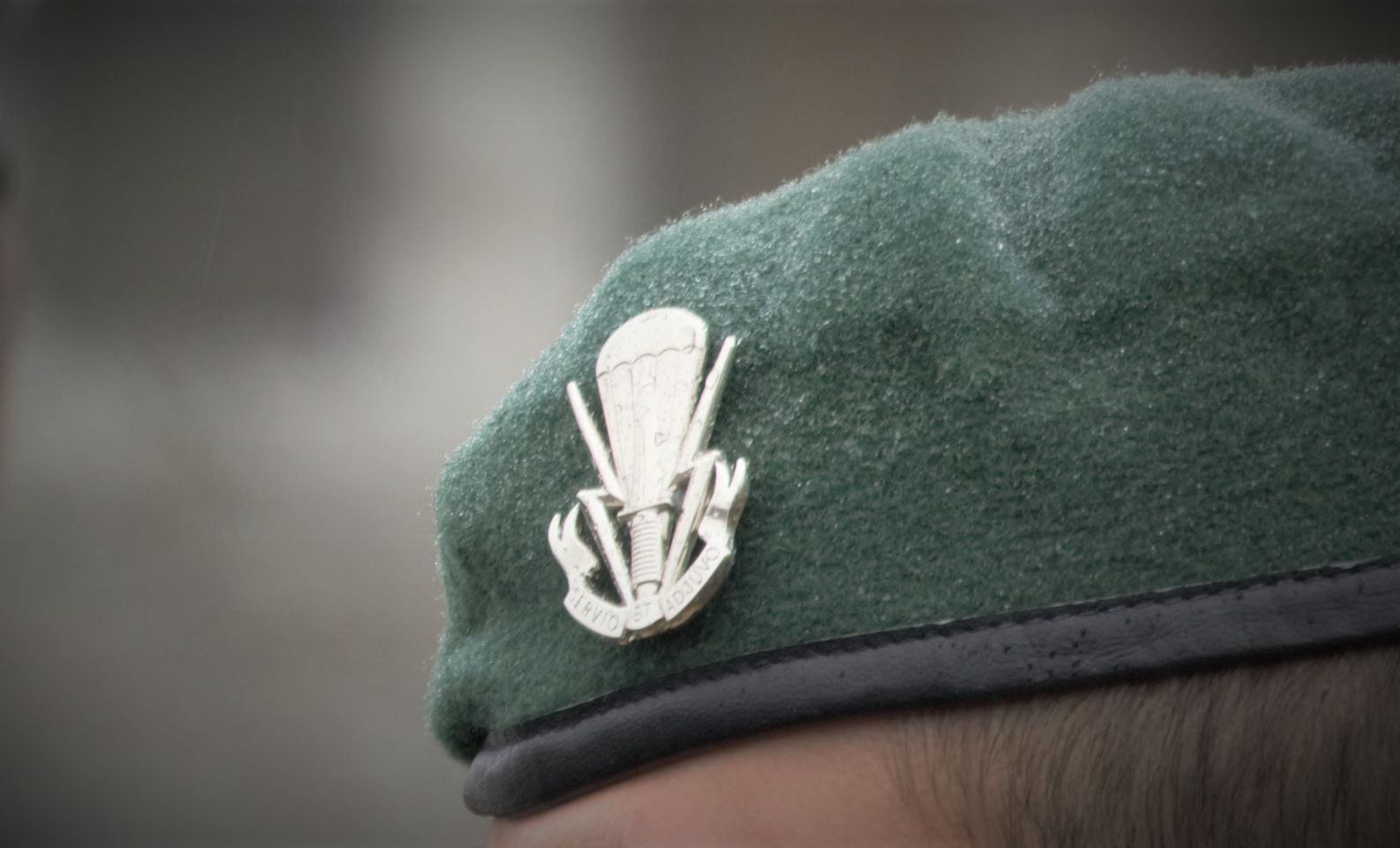
Green beret with insignia 6 Gp CIS

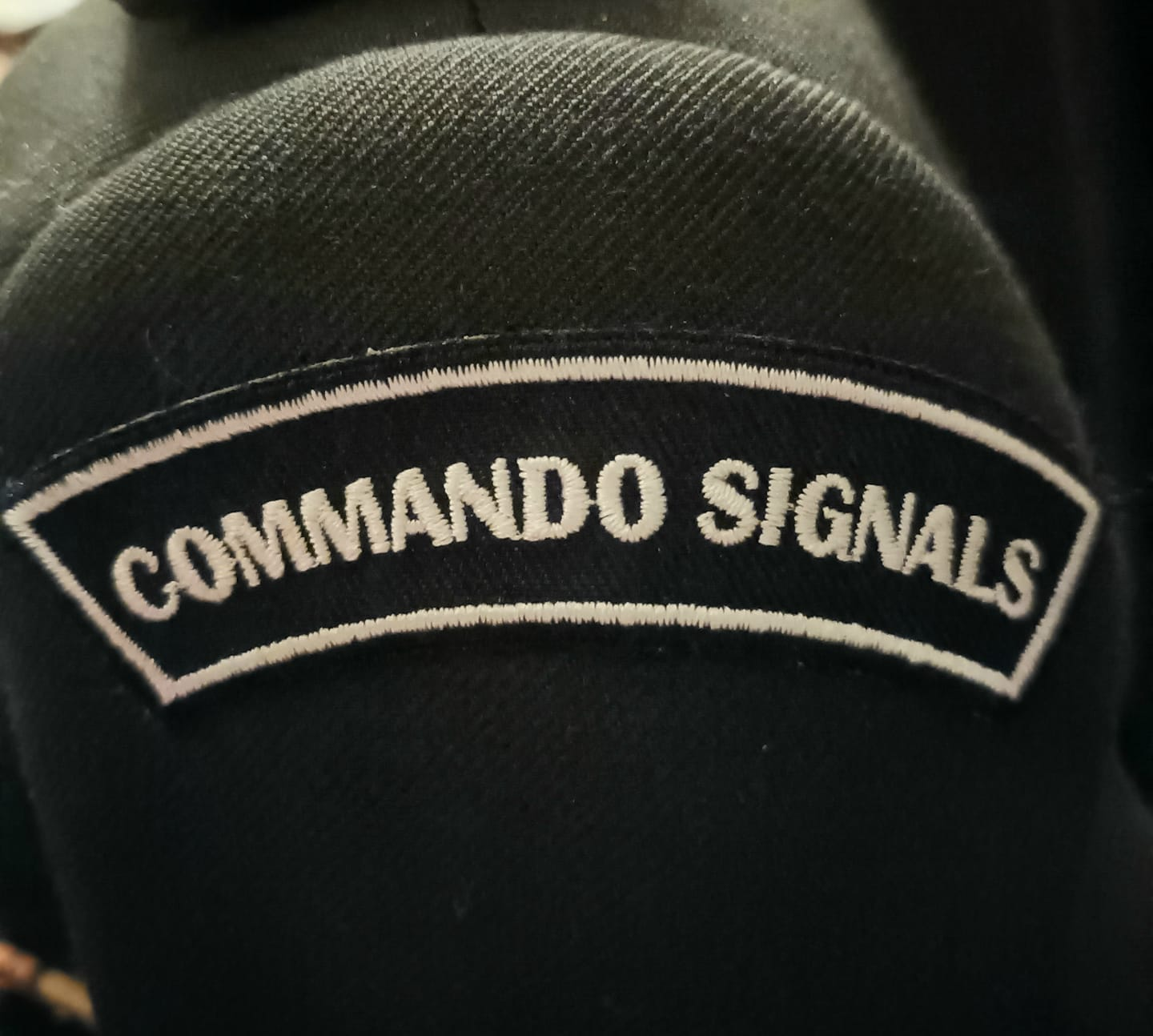

As of January 26, 2023, personnel of 6 Gp CIS wear a beret insignia referring to the CIS community and the paracommando world. The paracommando personnel of the unit wear the green beret, as 6 Gp CIS is historically linked to the 4th Troop of the Nr 10 Inter-Allied Commando. Additionally, all 6 Gp CIS personnel wear the COMMANDO SIGNALS badge on the shoulder and the paracommando pins on their service dress as a sign of integration into the Special Operations Regiment.

== Colors ==
The colors bear the following honorable mentions:

- ‘Veldtocht 1914-1918’ (Campaign 1914-1918 (German invasion of Belgium)): awarded to all units of the land forces participating in the 1914-1918 campaign.
- ‘Yzer-Vlaanderen 1918’ (Yzer-Flanders 1918 (Battle of the Yser)): to commemorate the individual courage and the tireless dedication displayed by the telegraphists and the radiotelegraphists when setting up and maintaining the communications lines on the Flanders and Yzer battlefields in the 1914-1918 period.
- ‘Slag van Belgie 1940’ (Battle of Belgium 1940): During the May 1940 campaign, all the units belonging to the Signaling Regiment displayed so much stamina, complete dedication and infinite courage whilst fulfilling their heavy, all too often hidden and unfamiliar, duties. It is thanks to their technical and military qualities that even in the harshest of times command could be conducted in a normal way.

This Fourragère in the colors of the ‘Oorlogskruis 1914-1918’ (Cross of War 1914-1918) with red and green accents is granted to units who have received two honorable mentions. Every member of such a unit shall wear a fourragère in the colors of the Cross of War (Croix de Guerre). The fourragère should not be confused with an Aiguillette or a Lanyard.

== Sources ==
- "Les communications durant la Première Guerre mondiale". 2014–18 (in French). 6 April 2018.
