= 1st Paratroopers Battalion (Belgium) =

1st Paratroopers Regiment (1946-1951) 1st Paratroopers Battalion (1951-2011)
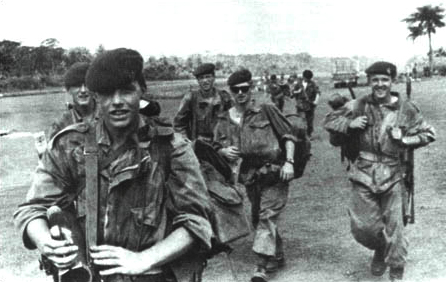
- Soldiers of the 1st Paratroopers Battalion in action during Operation Dragon Rouge.
- Active: 1946-2011
- Country: Belgium
- Branch: Belgian Land Component
- Type: Airborne forces
- Size: Battalion
- Part of: Paracommando Brigade
- Garrison/HQ: Diest
- Motto(s): Who Dares Wins
- Colors
- March: March of the Belgian Parachutists

Commanders
- Notable commanders: Major Eddy Blondeel

Insignia
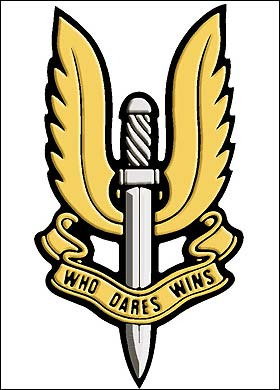
- Cap badge

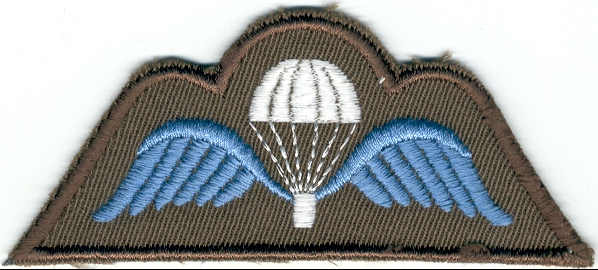
- Paratrooper Qualification Brevet

The 1st Paratroopers Battalion (French: 1^{er} Bataillon Parachutiste, Dutch: 1 Bataljon Parachutisten) or 1 PARA was a one of four airborne forces battalion unit of the Belgian Army and part of the Para-Commando Brigade from 1946 to 2011. Its regimental traditions, including its badge and motto, were heavily influenced by the experience of many of its personnel in Belgian SAS during the Second World War. The battalion was disbanded on 1 July 2011.

== Special Air Service ==
Many personnel who had served in the Belgian 5th Special Air Service (5th SAS) during the Second World War chose to re-enlist in the army following the war. These included the first commander of the unit, Eddy Blondeel, who had served in France and the Ardennes during the war.

== Major Operations ==
=== Congo Crisis ===
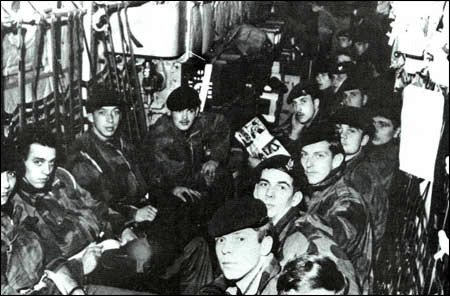
Soldiers from 1st Paratroopers Battalion in C-130s before jumping on Simi-Simi Airport during Dragon Rouge, November 1964

During political instability in the former Belgian colony of the Republic of Congo, soldiers from the 1st Paratroopers Battalion (with an attached company from the 2nd Commando Battalion and elements of the 3rd Paratroopers Battalion) were sent to capture the airfield at Stanleyville. In November 1964, 299 Belgian paratroopers, under Colonel Charles Laurent jumped on Simi-Simi Airport from USAF C-130 aircraft.

After securing the airfield, the paratroopers made their way to the Victoria Hotel, where several hundred (mostly Belgian) civilians were being held by Simba rebels. Though 60 civilians were killed, Belgian paratroopers were still able to evacuate 1,800 Europeans and Americans, as well as 400 Congolese during the operation.

=== Rwandan Genocide ===
In the period leading up the Rwandan genocide, soldiers from 1st Paratroopers Battalion formed the Belgian contingent of the United Nations force in the country, known as UNAMIR which was commanded by the Canadian Brigadier-General Roméo Dallaire, from 1993. UNAMIR was tasked with maintaining the precarious balance between the Hutu-backed Rwandan government and the Tutsi rebels, known as the Rwandan Patriotic Front. As the former colonial power, Belgian forces made up the brunt of UNAMIR (around 400 men), but it also included soldiers from Ghana, Tunisia, Bangladesh, and Canada.

In March 1994, the 1st Paratroopers Battalion handed over to the 2nd Commando Battalion. In April 1994, 10 commandos would be murdered by Rwandan soldiers in Kigali - the largest single military loss for Belgium since the Second World War - and all Belgian personnel were controversially withdrawn from the country.

=== Balkans ===
In February 1992, the Belgian government decided to actively participate in the United Nations UNPROFOR force. The first Belgian troops (known as BELBAT 1), including 97 paratroopers, arrived in Croatia in April 1992.

A Belgian battalion, known as BELKOS, also served in the KFOR mission.

Between 1999 and 2000, 87 soldiers of 1st Paratroopers Battalion formed part of the international peacekeeping mission in Bosnia-Herzegovina.

=== Afghanistan ===
Since 2007, Belgian troops have been tasked with defending Kabul International Airport, which 1st Paratroopers Battalion have been actively involved in.

== Peacekeeping ==
=== Somalia ===
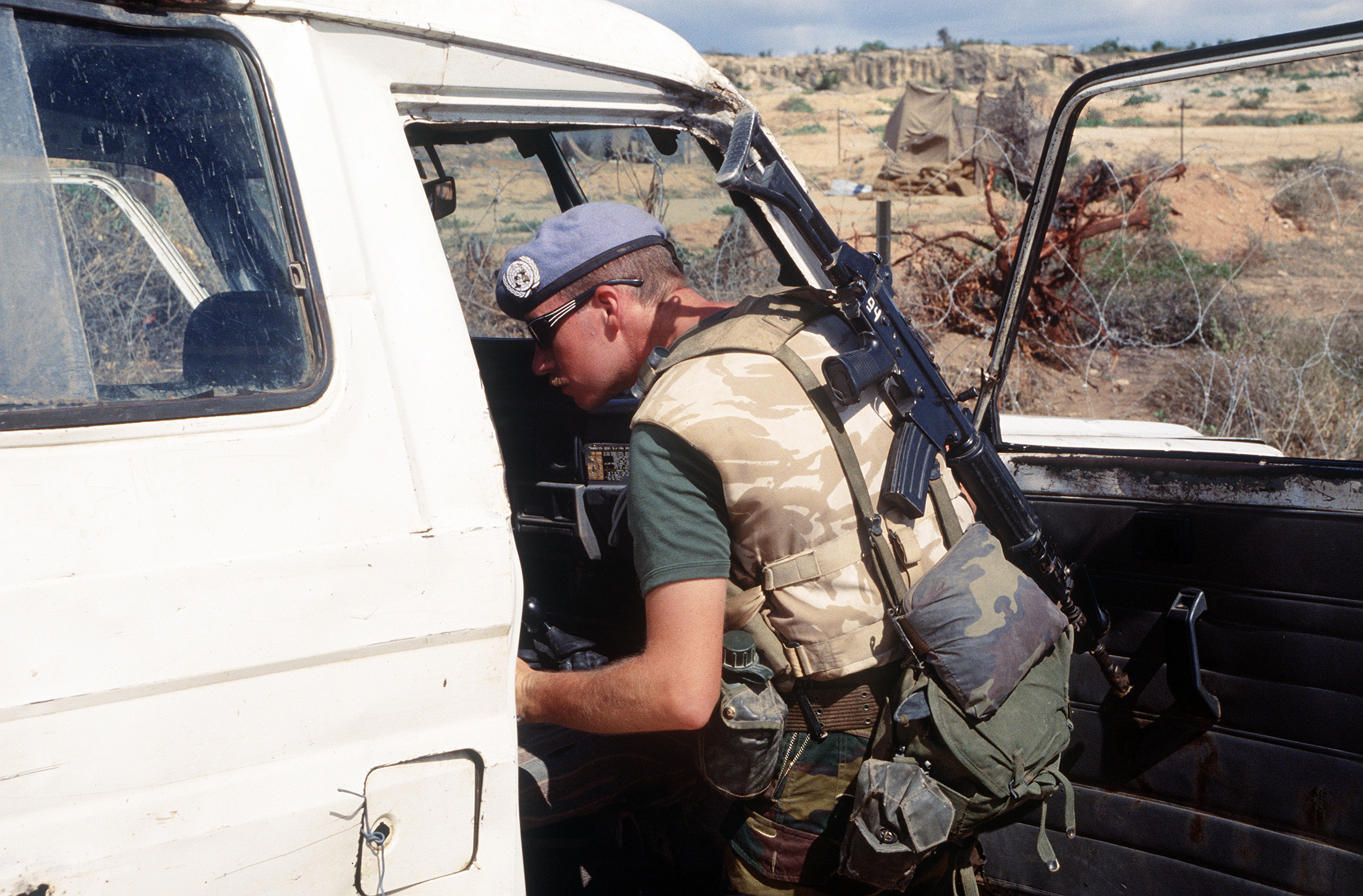
Belgian paratrooper searches a car, Somalia

In December 1992, 1st Paratroopers Battalion deployed to Somalia as part of US-led United Nations mission Operation Restore Hope. Part of their role involved protecting UN aid distribution, as well as searching out militants. In March 1993, three Belgians were killed and two wounded when their Jeep was attacked.

=== Lebanon ===
Soldiers from 1st Paratroopers Battalion have been deployed to peace-keep in Lebanon as part of the United Nations UNIFIL mission. The Belgian force, known as BELUBAT (since it is also joint with Luxembourg) has been made up of soldiers from 1st and 3rd Paratroopers Battalions.

== Standard ==
In a ceremony in Brussels on 22 October 1946, Prince Charles presented lieutenant-colonel Eddy Blondeel with the standard of the Paratroopers Regiment, carrying the following citations, inherited from the 5th SAS in the Second World War:

- Normandy
- Belgium
- Ardennes
- Emden
- Oldenburg

The standard also carries the fourragère of the Order of Leopold and the French croix de guerre.
