= 3rd Paratroopers Battalion (Belgium) =

Belgian United Nations Command (1950-1955) 3rd Paracommando Battalion (1955-1959) 3rd Parachute Battalion (1959-)
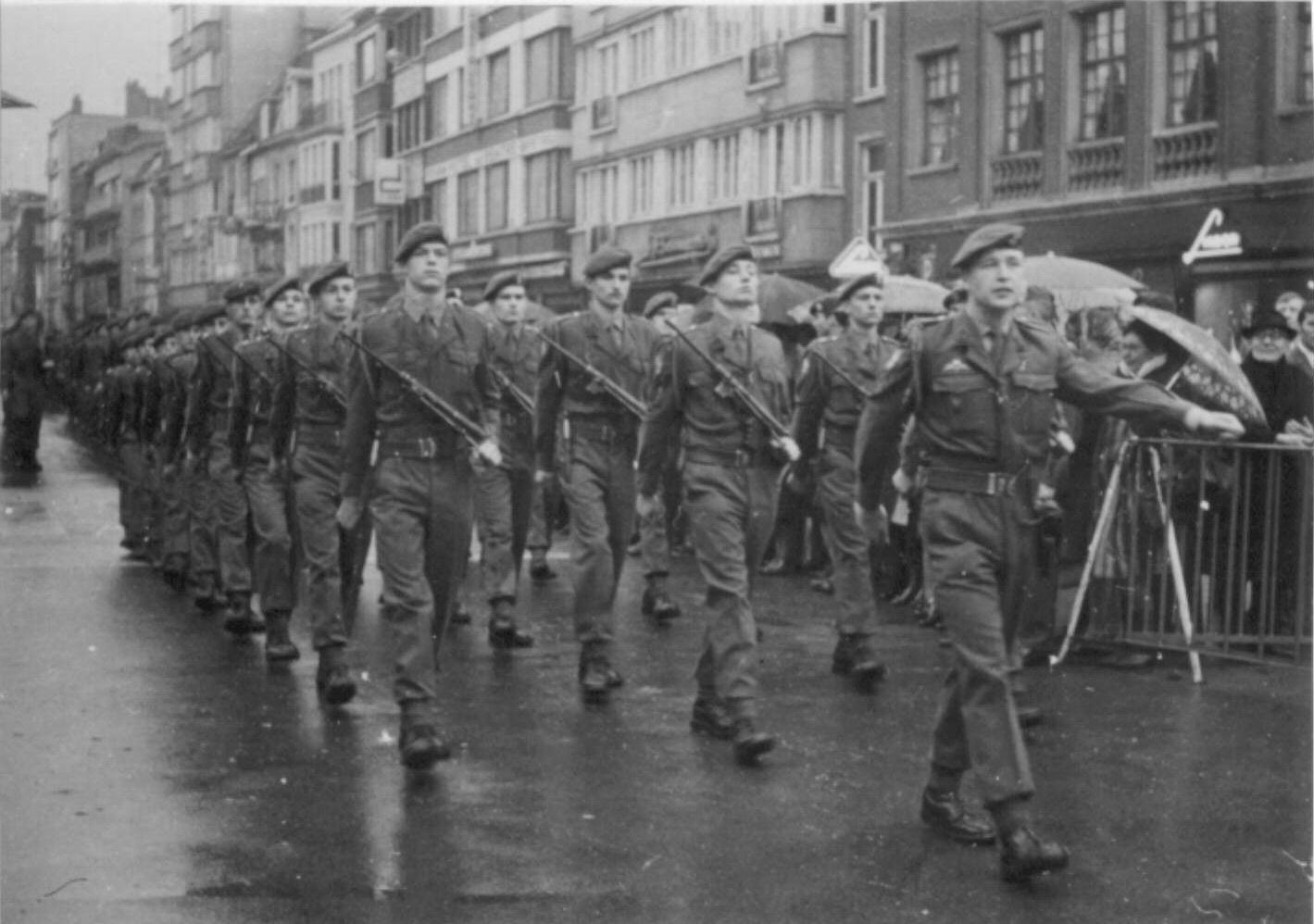
- Soldiers from the 3rd Parachute Battalion parade in Kortrijk, 1971.
- Active: 1950-
- Country: Belgium; Luxembourg (1950-1953)
- Branch: Belgian Army
- Type: Airborne forces
- Size: 500
- Part of: Special Operations Regiment
- Garrison/HQ: Tielen
- Motto: "Belgium"
- Engagements: Korean War; Congo Crisis; Lebanon; War in Afghanistan

Insignia
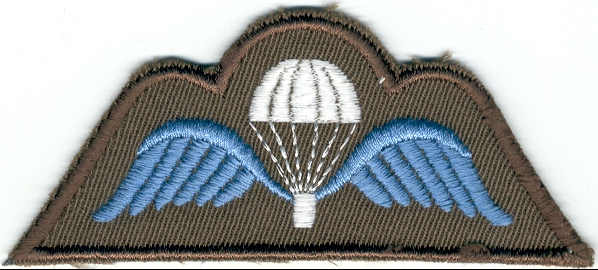
- Parachute Qualification Brevet

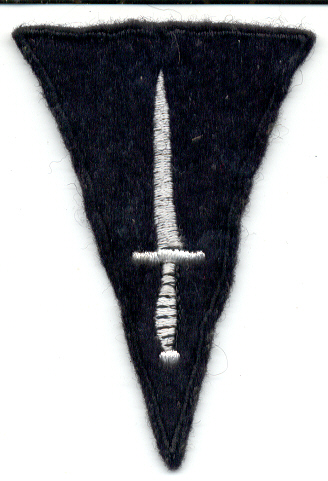
- Commando Qualification Brevet

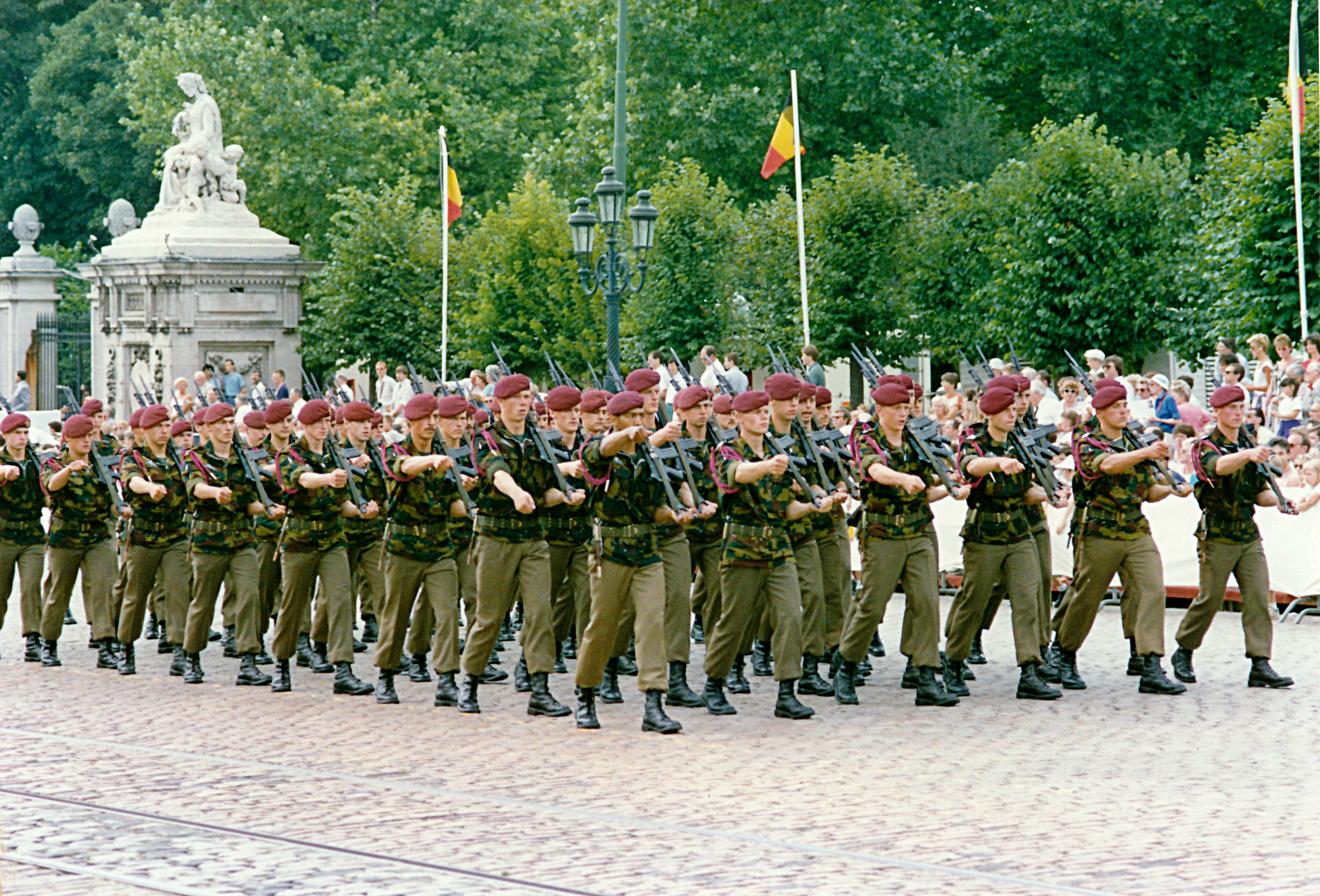
Detachment of the 3rd Paratroopers battalion parading in front of the King on 21 July 1989, Place des Palais in Brussels.

The 3rd Parachute Battalion (French: 3^{ème} Bataillon Parachutistes, Dutch: 3 Bataljon Parachutisten) is one of four airborne forces battalion unit of the Belgian Army and part of the 'Special Operations Regiment'. It carries on the regimental traditions of the Belgian Korean War volunteers.

== Corps of Volunteers for Korea ==
After the outbreak of the Korean War in 1950, the United Nations asked the Belgian government for military assistance. Belgium, conscious of the vast cost and logistical difficulties of sending large numbers of men or equipment across the world, elected to put an elite unit under UN command. Since the Belgian constitution forbade sending anyone but volunteers on overseas deployments in peacetime, it was not possible to send an existing battalion, so the Belgian United Nations Command (known as BUNC) was created. BUNC also incorporated a platoon of volunteer from Luxembourg. BUNC soldiers wore Brown Berets with a new cap badge to distinguish them from other Belgian units.

BUNC fought in several of the key engagements of the Korean War from 1951, including the Battle of the Imjin River, the Battle of Haktang-ni and the Battle of Chatkol. BUNC won the United States Presidential Unit Citation and the Republic of Korea Presidential Unit Citation for its heroism, and citations for these battles are included on the Regimental Standard. Of the 3,000 Belgian soldiers who served in Korea, over 100 were killed in action between the battalion's arrival in 1951 and the 1953 armistice. The last Belgian forces left Korea in 1955.

== Peacekeeping ==
=== Somalia ===
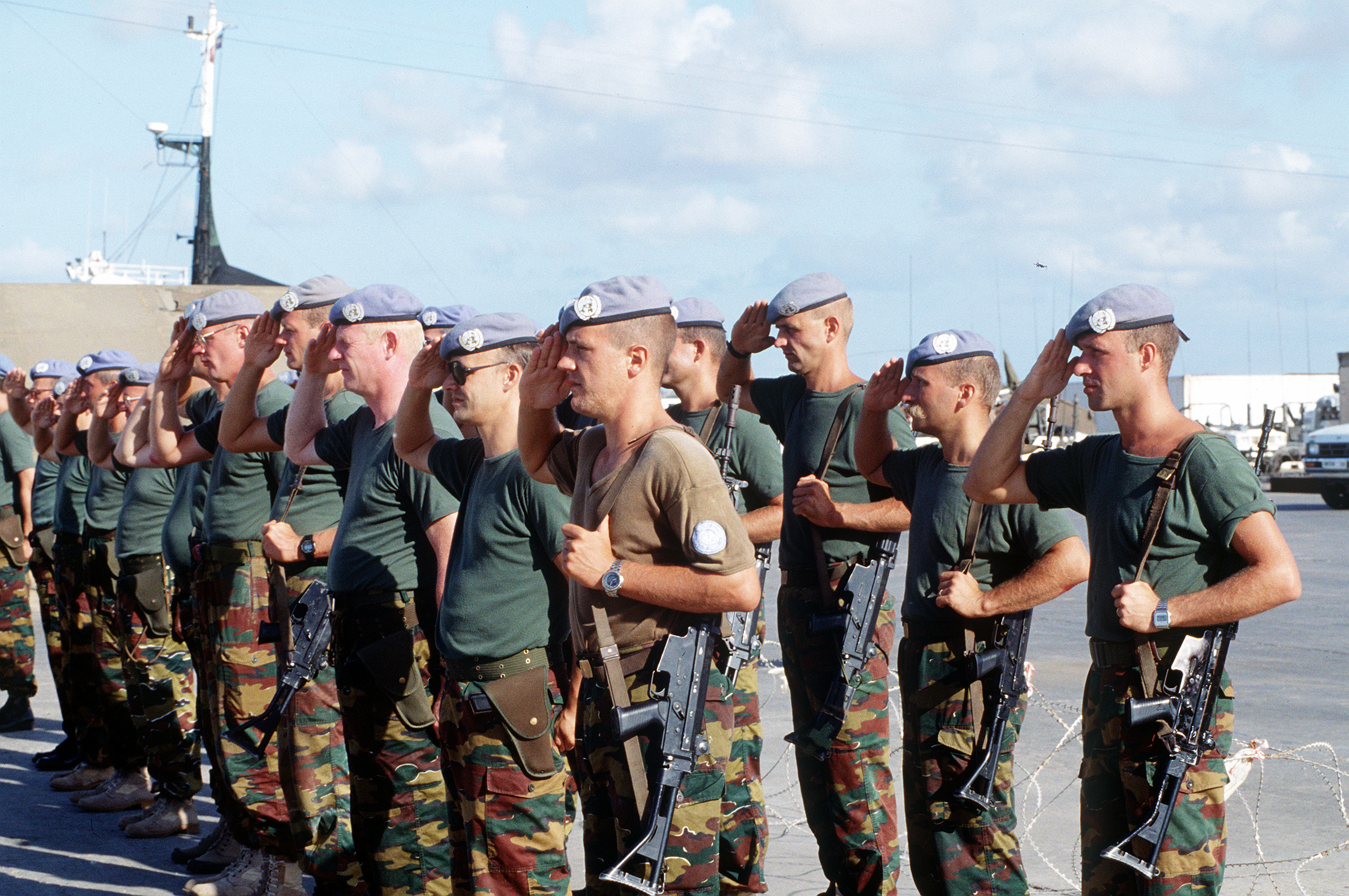
Belgian Paracommando's UNOSOM soldiers in Somalia,1993

In December 1992, 1st Parachute Battalion deployed to Somalia as part of US-led United Nations mission Operation Restore Hope. Their role involved protecting UN aid distribution, as well as searching out militants. The 3rd Parachute Battalion was later also deployed to the country.

In 1993, two soldiers of the 3rd Parachute Battalion were arrested, after a photo apparently showing two soldiers holding a Somali boy above a fire appeared in Belgian newspapers. Two soldiers were put on trial in Belgium, but both were acquitted by a military tribunal through lack of evidence.

=== Lebanon ===
Soldiers from 3rd Parachute Battalion have been deployed to peace-keep in Lebanon as part of the United Nations UNIFIL mission. The Belgian force, known as BELUBAT (since it is also joint with Luxembourg).

== Composition ==
The battalion was bilingual (French-Dutch) from its creation until 1982, but is now Dutch-speaking only.

The 3rd Parachute Battalion and the 2nd Commando Battalion personnel are all trained identically, and are designated as a Paracommando's on completion of their training, Personnel allocated to the 3rd Parachute Battalion are awarded the Parachute Maroon Beret, and wear the Parachute Qualification Brevet above the right side chest Pocket along with Belgian "Commando Dagger" brevet on the upper right sleeve

== Organisation ==
The 3rd Parachute Battalion comprises:

- Headquarters Company
- 17th Parachute Company (Assault) at Gavere
- 22nd Parachute Company (Assault) at Tielen
- 21st Parachute Company (Special Support and Reconnaissance) at Tielen

The 21st Parachute Company was transformed from an Assault Company to the SSR when the Special Operations Regiment was formed from the Light Brigade.

== See also ==
- King Philippe, a member of the battalion in 1983.
