= Eddy Blondeel =

Belgian Army commander

Edouard "Eddy" Blondeel
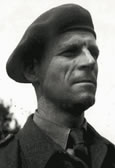
- Born: 25 January 1906; Ghent, Belgium
- Died: 23 May 2000 (aged 94); Brussels, Belgium
- Military career
- Allegiance: Belgium
- Branch: Free Belgian Forces; Belgian Army
- Service years: 1929–1930; 1940–1947
- Rank: Lieutenant-Colonel
- Nickname: Captain Blunt
- Units: 5th SAS; 1st Parachute Battalion
- Conflicts: Western Front (World War II); Allied advance from Paris to the Rhine; Ardennes offensive; Western Allied invasion of Germany
- Awards: Order of the Crown, Commander grade; Order of Leopold II, Commander grade with palm; Leopold Order, Officer Grade with palm; Belgian War Cross 1940–1945 with palm; French Croix de Guerre 1939–1945 with palm; Legion d'honneur, Officer Grade; Luxembourg War Cross; Dutch Bronzen Leeuw; Distinguished Service Order (United Kingdom)
- Other work: Engineer

Lieutenant-Colonel Dr. (Dent.) Edouard "Eddy" Blondeel DSO (25 January 1906 – 23 May 2000) was the wartime commander of the Belgian 5th SAS during World War II. Following the war he was first Commanding Office of the 1st Regiment of Parachutists. He retired from the army in 1947 to work as an engineer with Wiggins Teape.

== Early life ==
Edouard Blondeel was born in Ghent on 25 January 1906. He initially studied at a German School in Ghent, but following the outbreak of World War I in 1914, his parents no longer wanted him to be educated at a German school, and he was enrolled in a bilingual Belgian school.

In his youth he excelled at basketball, fencing, and rowing, and at the age of 13 he took up scouting. Before the Second World War he was appointed Commissioner of Scouts in the Flanders region of Belgium. He later studied engineering at Ghent University and developed his linguistic abilities from the varied environments there.

He fulfilled his national service in an artillery regiment, where he was promoted from private to sergeant in under a year.

After his time as a conscript, he set up practice as an engineer, but wished to be more involved in serving people. In 1934 he decided to study medicine and specialize in dentistry. His work earned him a diploma with distinctions at the University of Brussels, and he won a scholarship that enabled him to continue his medical studies at Northwestern University near Chicago. He earned a doctorate in Dentistry.

== World War II ==
In 1940 he received orders to report to Joliette in Quebec, Canada, the rallying centre for Belgians living in North America. In 1942, he was appointed to command the Belgian company that was to embark in June of that year to Britain. In England his whole unit without exception volunteered to form the Belgian Independent Parachute Company. The men trained at various locations, including the parachute school at Ringway (near Manchester), the airborne centre at Hardwick, and the glider base at Brize Norton. In 1943, the Belgians underwent a course based at Inverlochy Castle and completed their training in Scotland with other paratrooper units. These included the 3rd and 4th French Parachute Battalions, as well as 1st and 2nd (British) SAS.

On 28 August 1944, Blondeel, then a Major, parachuted into the Ardennes forest. An advance party had sent a signal advising against anyone joining them, due to heavy enemy ground presence. However, Blondeel insisted on joining in order to gain a view of the pace at which the battle was moving. His leadership and courage inspired local Maquis as well as his own men. By a series of successful ambushes, Blondeel and his men were able to significantly delay and harass the withdrawal.

In 1944, it was decided that the Belgian SAS Paratroopers were to be kept in reserve. Blondeel believed this would be for operations in Belgium. His view changed when he was informed by Brigadier McLeod (Commanding officer of the SAS Brigade) that Belgian authorities did not want Belgian SAS to be the first into Belgium. Blondeel did not understand and visited Belgian authorities in London to find out why. Brigadier McLeod also believed the Belgian government's stance odd, but could only plan for Belgian drops in France, where it was decided a total of 14 squads of Belgian paratroopers would be dropped in France. Blondeel grew tired of the politics and ordered an officer, Lt. Renkin, the task to contact Belgian resistance. Renkin was dropped in France and crossed the border into Belgium. When Blondeel was informed, by radio, that he had crossed the border, he asked Brigadier McLeod if he could be dropped with some men to join Renkin. When Blondeel pointed out the drop zone on a map the following exchange occurred.

McLeod: "But, this drop zone is in Belgium."

Blondeel: "Oh. I hadn't noticed."

McLeod: "Ok. In that case, I didn't notice either."

Blondeel was dropped with some men in at Gedinne. His squad was almost immediately put in action with the resistance when he received a message from London stating that 'The Belgian government are not happy'. After the war, Blondeel explained that he believed the reasons were largely because of Jean-Baptiste Piron, a Belgian military commander, as he had desperately wished his Brigade to be the first into Belgium.

Shortly after the Belgian operation, the squadron traveled to Brussels where Blondeel visited home, where he saw his wife and two daughters for the first time in five years. He would later recall this to be his best memory of the war. From 20 to 23 December 1944, a detachment of armed jeeps under Blondeel's command reconnoitered in the Marche area of Italy, under the general use of the 29th Armoured Brigade. From 28 December – 14 January 1945 they operated in the same role under the 6th Airborne Division with marked success. It was due to Blondeel's organization and training the unit adapted to the new role and integrated effectively with British troops. He believed his squadron should successfully accomplish any task offered to it.

Blondeel's squadron arrested numerous Nazi war criminals, including Joachim von Ribbentrop (in Hanover by Belgian SAS Sergeant Jacques Goffinet), and assisted in the arrest of the Dönitz Government in Flensburg. Prior to the German surrender, Blondeel's squadron operated near Godensholt in Germany when he was ordered to undertake an operation in which heavy casualties were possible. However, as the patrol was setting out, the order was received to cease all hostilities. Blondeel gathered his squadron together for a celebration feast, and played piano classics and popular war melodies, ending with Auld Lang Syne. 'We must now face the uncertainties and complexities of peace', he remarked.

== Later life ==
Blondeel faced difficulties in Belgium, hindered by bureaucracy and politics, and it is said he never promoted to the rank of General due to some politicians' dislike of him. To ensure his wartime unit would not be disbanded, Blondeel established the Belgian SAS Regimental Association, of which he was elected president. In 1947, Blondeel again pursued engineering working for a paper company. The company was taken over by Wiggins Teape in 1974, but Blondeel remained there and eventually retired in 1981 at the age of 75.

In his later years, he continued to serve Belgium. He was appointed General Commissioner for Scouts, elected Governor of the Belgian Rotary club, and President of Mars and Mercure (a reserve officers association). He also accepted various visiting academic posts in Canada and the United States.

== Personal life ==
Blondeel married in 1932 to Elza Francisca Van Gorp. They had two daughters. He died in 2000 in Brussels, aged 94.

== Awards and decorations ==

- Commander of the order of the crown
- Commander of the order of the Leopold II with palm
- Officer of the order of Leopold with palm
- War cross WWII with palm
- Commemorative medal of WWII with crossed swords
- Officer of the legion of honor (France)
- Distinguished Service Order (United Kingdom)
- War cross with palm (France)
- War cross (Luxembourg)
- Bronze Lion (Netherlands)
- France and Germany star (United Kingdom)
- Defence medal (United Kingdom)
- War Medal 1939–1945
