= Kitona =

Town in the Democratic Republic of Congo

Coordinates: 5°55′12″S 12°26′38″E

Kitona is a town of about 4,000 persons in the Kongo Central province of the Democratic Republic of the Congo. It is located to the southwest of the country along the Atlantic Ocean, about 190 miles southwest of the capital city of Kinshasa. Following the Second World War, a Belgian military base, including an airbase, was established there, along with another at Kamina. Both bases played important roles during the early 1960s Congo Crisis.

Upon the outbreak of the Second Congo War on August 4, 1998, Rwandan and Ugandan forces under the command of James Kabarebe landed at the airbase and quickly captured the town. It was subsequently recaptured by a government-aligned Angolan force with tanks that drove out of the province of Cabinda on 22 August.

Currently, an airbase is located in the town.
