= 2nd Commando Battalion (Belgium) =

Commando Regiment (1945–1955) 2nd Commando Battalion (1955–present)
- Active: 1945–present
- Country: Belgium
- Branch: Belgian Land Component
- Type: Commando
- Size: 500
- Part of: Special Operations Regiment
- Garrison/HQ: Flawinne
- Motto: United We Conquer
- Colors
- March: Marche des Commandos
- Engagements: Congo Crisis; Rwandan genocide

Insignia
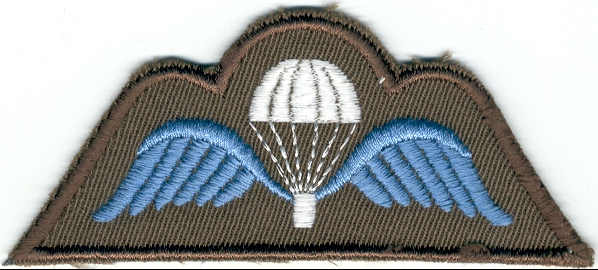
- Parachute Qualification Brevet

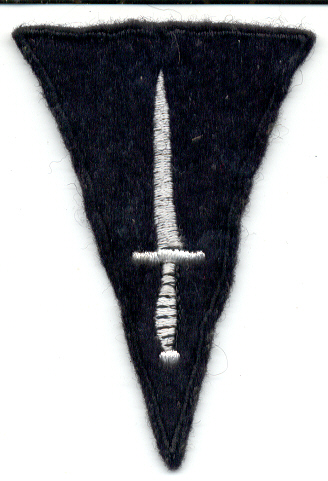
- Commando Qualification Brevet

The 2nd Commando Battalion (French: 2e Bataillon de Commandos, officially abbreviated to 2 Codo) is one of four airborne forces battalion unit of the Belgian Army and part of the 'Special Operations Regiment'. Its regimental traditions, including the name "Commando" and the green beret, were adopted from the Belgian soldiers who served in No. 10 (Inter-Allied) Commando during the Second World War.

== History ==
=== Formation ===
The traditions of the 1st Commando Battalion were originally based on those of 4 Troop of 10 (Inter-allied) Commando during the Second World War, which fought in North Africa, Italy and Northern Europe. It is particularly notable for its role during Operation Infatuate: the invasion of the Dutch island of Walcheren in 1944. All Belgian soldiers in 4 Troop were trilingual (French-Dutch-English).

The badge of the new unit was designed by Padre Devos, based the British Commando Fairbairn-Sykes dagger.

=== Belgian Congo ===
During the months leading up to independence of the Belgian Congo, soldiers of the 2nd Commando Battalion were positioned in Bas-Congo. To cover more territory, the 4th Commando Battalion and 6th Commando Battalion (Belgium) were created from officers of the unit and new recruits in order to control the key area around Kitona and Kamina.

In 1959, 2nd Commando Battalion was moved to Léopoldville to maintain order during the riots.

In 1964, a company from 2nd Commando was included in Operation Dragon Rouge for the drop on Stanleyville to recover hostages. The company was mentioned in dispatches.

=== Rwandan Genocide ===
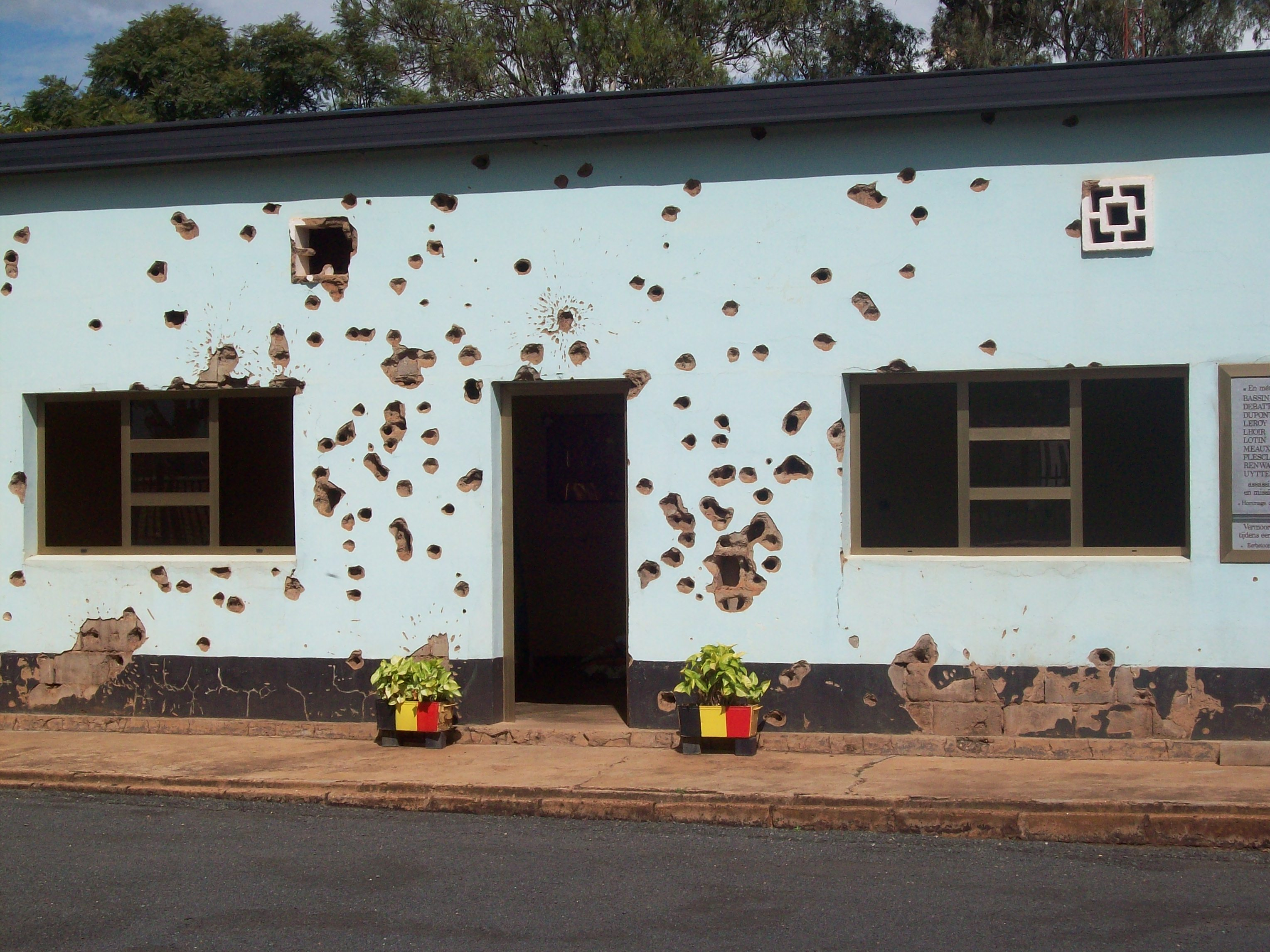
Site of the massacre in Kigali, Rwanda.

In March 1994, the 2nd Commando Battalion (with elements from the 3rd Parachute Battalion) took over from the 1st Parachute Battalion in the United Nations UNAMIR mission in Rwanda.

On 6 April 1994, following the downing of Rwandan president Juvénal Habyarimana's plane, the RTLM radio station accused the Belgian peacekeepers of having shot down–or of helping to shoot down – the aircraft. The 10 Belgian soldiers who had been assigned to protect the Prime Minister, Agathe Uwilingiyimana, as well as five Ghanaians, were captured by an overwhelming number of Rwandan soldiers, and beaten to death. According to the UNKIBAT-01 Tab 241 of the Prosecution Case File, "The bodies showed signs of fighting, some had rifle-but or bayonet injuries, some showed signs of having been struck by machetes or bullet wounds." The Belgian contingent was deliberately targeted in this way in order to provoke the Belgian contingent to withdraw from UNAMIR (which it did several days later), critically weakening the remaining UN force.

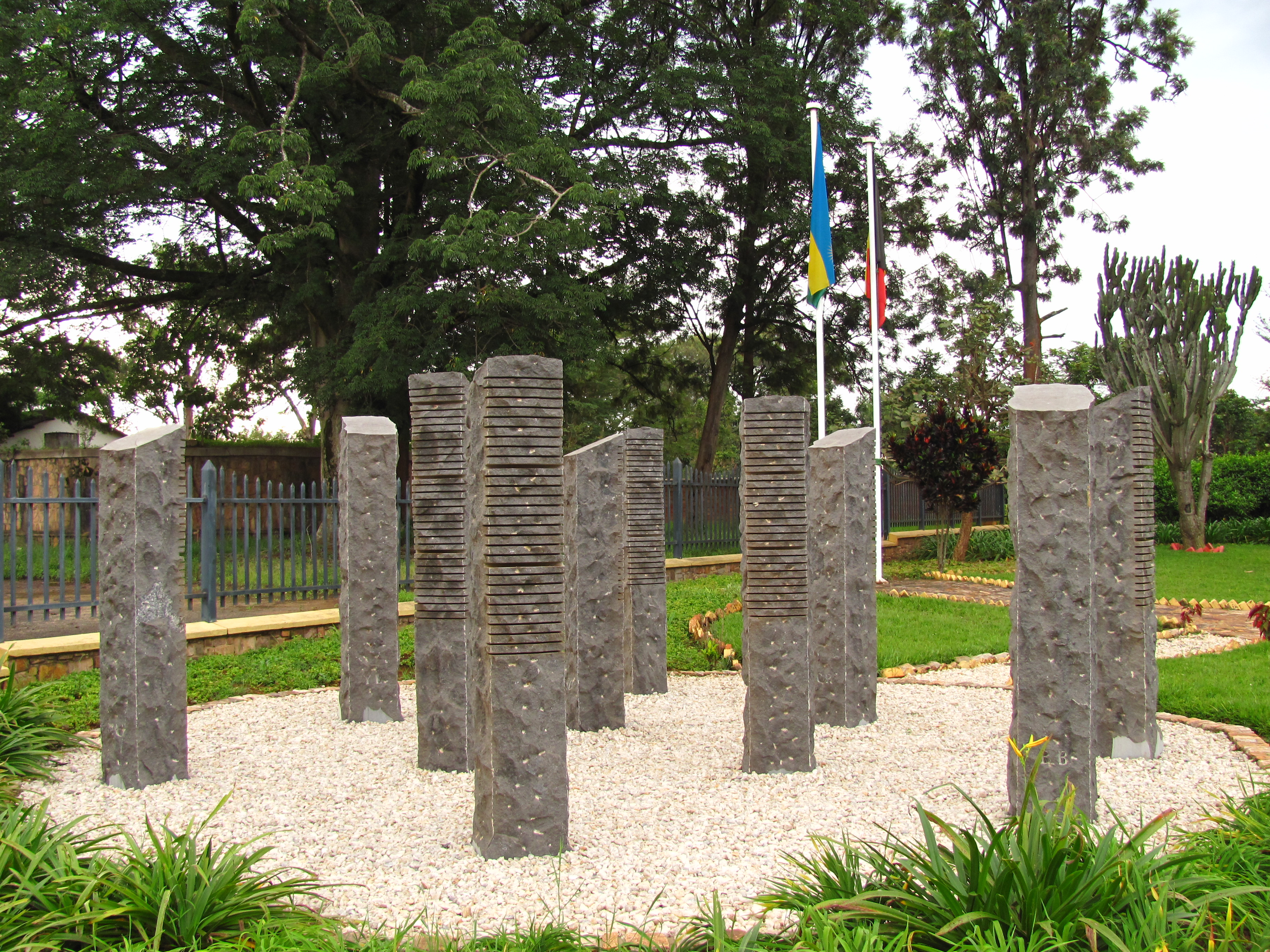
Memorial for the dead Belgian UNAMIR personnel in Kigali, Rwanda.

The names of the peacekeepers who died were:

- Lt. Thierry Lottin (aged 29)
- 1Sgt. Yannick Leroy (aged 29)
- Cpl. Bruno Bassinne (aged 27)
- Cpl. Stephane Lhoir (aged 28)
- Cpl. Bruno Meaux (aged 28)
- Cpl. Louis Plescia (aged 32)
- Cpl. Christophe Renwa (aged 26)
- Cpl. Marc Uyttebroek (aged 26)
- Cpl. Christophe Dupont (aged 25)
- Cpl. Alain Debatty (aged 29)

The murder of the 10 soldiers was the biggest single loss of Belgian personnel since the Second World War and provoked outrage in Belgium. On 19 April all Belgian personnel were evacuated from the country.

The murder was subject of an investigation, under the title of "Qui a tué nos paras?" ("Who killed our paras?"). The withdrawal and fatal weakening of the UN force was viewed as a catastrophe in Belgian military circles: Gaston Francsson, a decorated Belgian veteran of the Korean War returned the UN medals he had won to the United Nations in protest at the decision. A Rwandan Major, Bernard Ntuyahaga, was later arrested and convicted of the killings.

== Composition ==
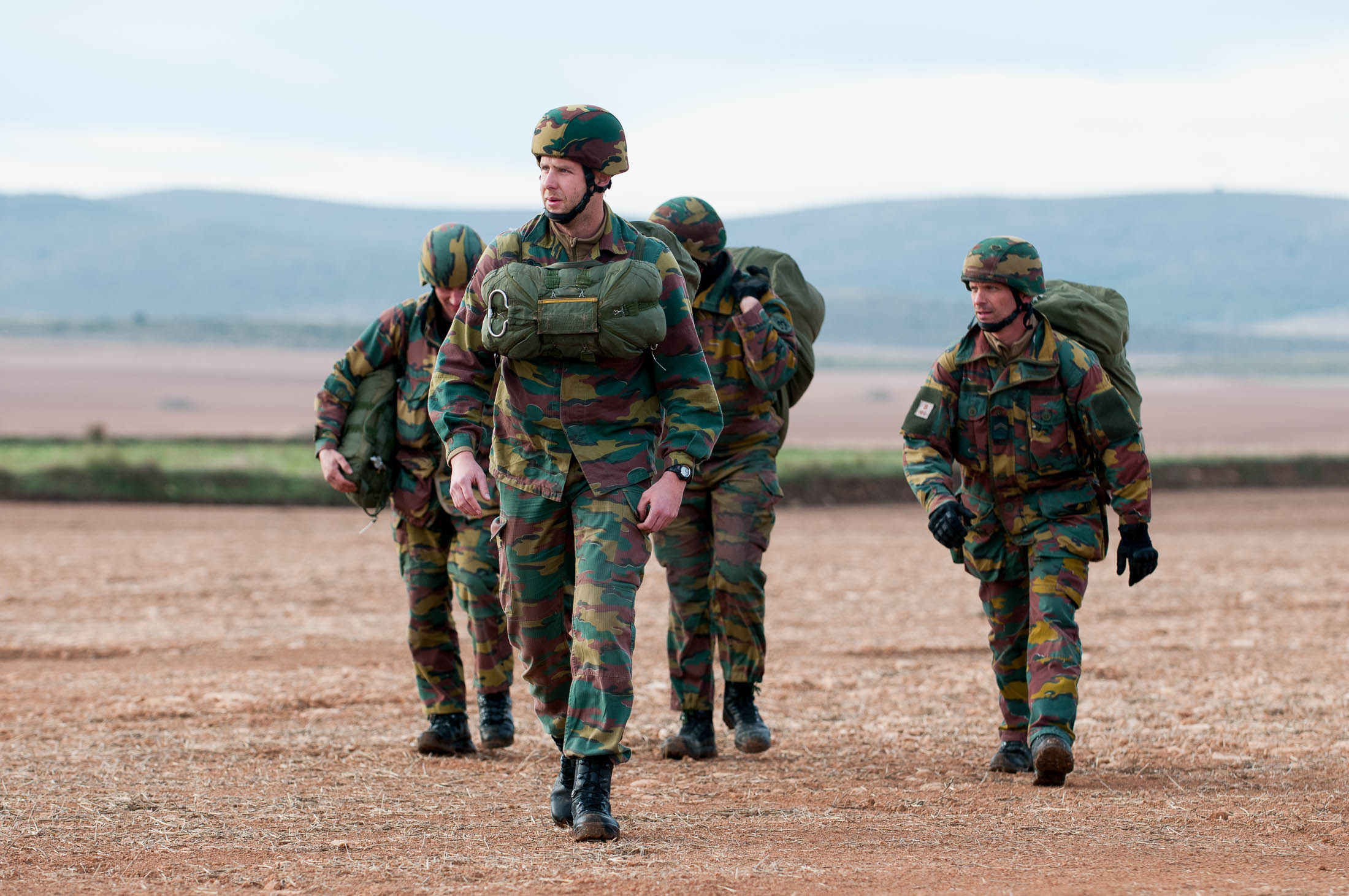
Paracommandos of 2nd Commando Battalion, during an airborne operation at Trident Juncture 2015

The battalion was bilingual (French-Dutch) from its creation until 1982, but is now Francophone only.

The 2nd Commando Battalion and the 3rd Paratroopers Battalion personnel are all trained identically, and are designated as a Paracommando on completion of their training, Personnel allocated to the 2nd Commando Battalion are awarded the Sherwood Green Beret, and wear the Parachute Qualification Brevet above the right side chest Pocket and Belgian "Commando Dagger" brevet on the upper right sleeve

== Organisation ==
The 2nd Commando Battalion comprises:

- HQ staff
- 12th commando company
- 13th commando company
- 16th commando company
- service company

== Standard ==
In a ceremony on 26 October 1946 in Brussels, Prince Charles awarded the unit's standard to lieutenant-colonel Danloy, carrying the following citations inherited from 4 (Belgian) Troop of No. 10 (Inter-allied) Commando during World War II:

- Italy
- Yugoslavia
- Walcheren

The standard also carried the fourragère of the Belgian croix de guerre.
