= Who Dares Wins =

Motto of the British Special Air Service

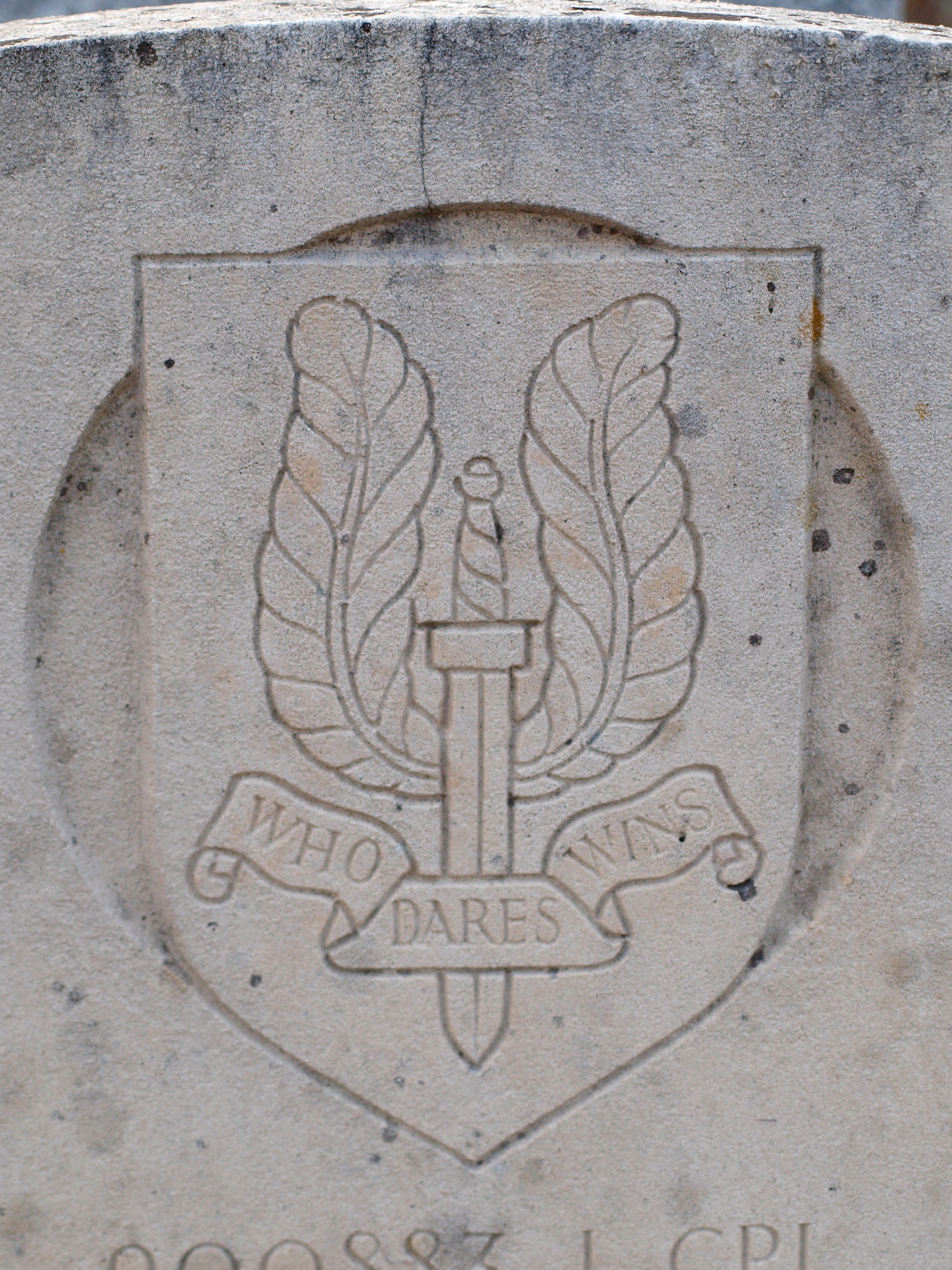
War Grave from L/Cpl Jimmy "Curly" Hall in Les Ormes (Yonne, France)

Who Dares Wins (Greek: Ο Τολμών Νικά, O tolmón niká; Latin: Qui audet adipiscitur; French: Qui ose gagne; Italian: Chi osa vince; Portuguese: Quem ousa vence; German: Wer wagt, gewinnt; Dutch: Wie niet waagt, die niet wint; Hebrew: המעז מנצח) is a motto made popular in the English-speaking world by the British Special Air Service.

The German: Wer wagt, gewinnt is attested from at least the 18th century.

As the motto of the SAS, it is normally credited to its founder, Sir David Stirling. Among the SAS themselves, it is sometimes humorously corrupted to "Who cares [who] wins?".

The expression appears in a medieval Arabic book of fairy tales, translated and published in 2014.

The phrase is the motto of Baron Alvingham of Woodfold in the County Palatine of Lancaster, a title in the Peerage of the United Kingdom.
