= Karima =

Karima (Arabic: كريمة) is an Arabic given name. In Arabic, the meaning of the name Karima is "generous." Karima is the female form of the name Karim. It is a popular name in Arab countries.

Among the Agikuyu of central Kenya, "Karima" refers to a mountain that is small in stature.

== Given name ==
- Karīma bint ʿAmmār, better known as Wuhsha al-dallala, an 11th-century businesswoman
- Karima Adebibe (born 1985), English-Moroccan actress and model
- Karima Abd-Daif (born 1965), Moroccan Norwegian politician for the Labour Party
- Karima Brown (1967–2021), South African journalist
- Karima Christmas-Kelly (born 1989), American basketball coach
- Karima Delli (born 1979), French politician
- Karima Medjeded, French judoka
- Karima Shapandar, Marvel Comics character

== Places ==
- Karima, Sudan
- Crimea

== Other ==
- Karima (plant), a genus of plants in the family Euphorbiaceae

== See also ==
- Insoumise et dévoilée
