= Marie Anne Simonis =

Belgian textile industrialist

Anne Marie Simonis
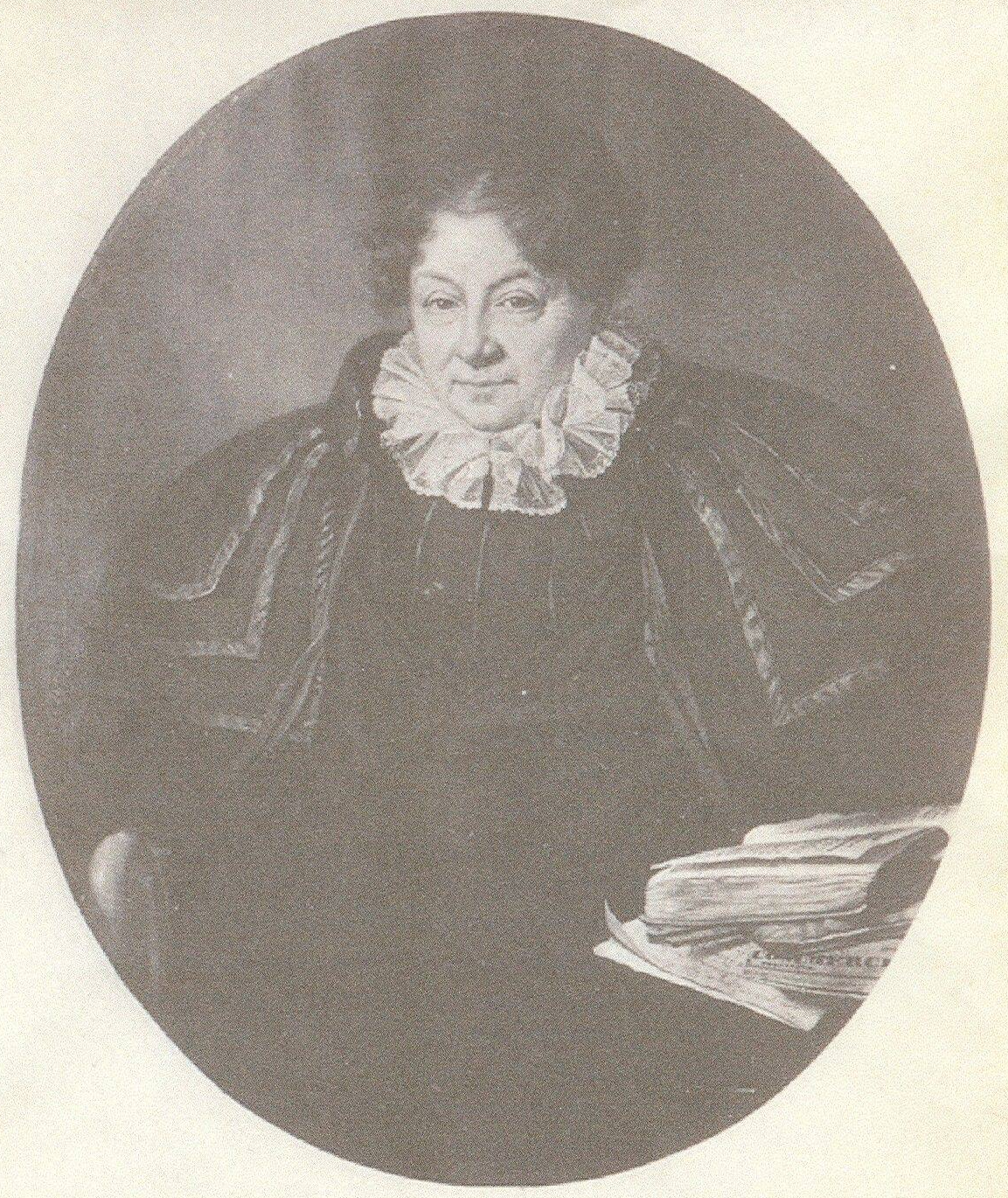
- Born: 17 January 1758; Verviers, Prince-bishopric of Liège, Holy Roman Empire
- Died: 21 November 1831 (aged 73); Theux, Liège Province, Belgium
- Occupation: industrialist

Marie Anne Simonis (17 January 1758 – 21 November 1831), known as "La Grande Madame", was a Belgian textile industrialist. She played an important part in the industrialization of what is now Belgium. Together with her brother, Iwan Simonis, she introduced the mechanization of the textile industry in the territory by adopting the inventions of the British textile industry, such as the Spinning Jenny.

== Life ==
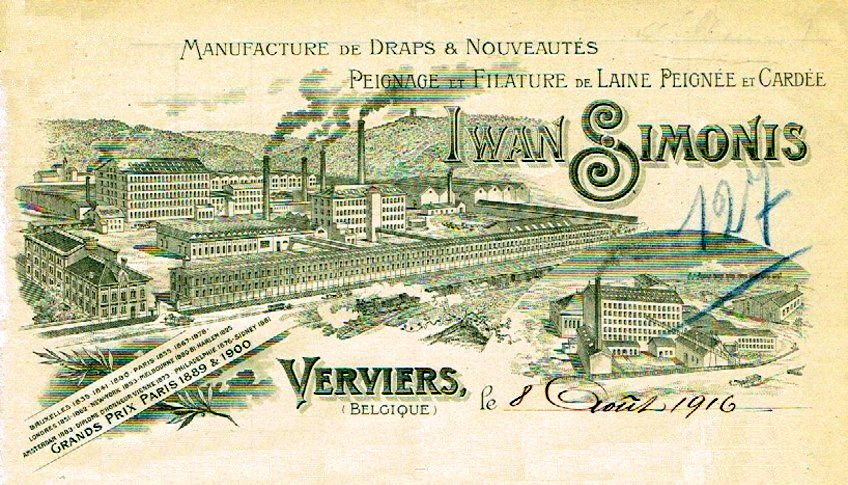
Iwan Simonis woolen mill in Verviers

Marie Anne Simonis was born in Verviers on 17 January 1758. On 11 December 1777 she married the textile industrialist Jean-François Biolley (1755-1822), the head of the Biolley firm. She took control over her spouse's company due to his health condition.

Showing hospitality to French refugees after the outbreak of the French Revolution, with the French invasion of the Prince-bishopric of Liège she became a refugee herself in 1795, first moving to Brunswick and later Hamburg. Returning to Verviers when matters had quietened down, she became closely associate with William Cockerill, who produced machines for her husband's factory.

Out of concern for the condition of her workers, she founded schools and hospitals for the poor. She died at Hodbomont Castle, in the municipality of Theux, on 21 November 1831.
