= List of protected heritage sites in Theux =

This table shows an overview of the protected heritage sites in the Walloon town Theux. This list is part of Belgium's national heritage.

| Object | Year/architect | Town/section | Address | Coordinates | Number^{?} | Image |
|---|---|---|---|---|---|---|
| House "Maison de Limbourg" ^{(nl)} ^{(fr)} | | Theux | rue de la Chaussée, n°35 | 50.534734°N 5.812085°E | 63076-CLT-0001-01 Info | Huis Maison de Limbourg |
| Haldes calaminaires of Rocheux ^{(nl)} ^{(fr)} | | Theux | | 50.539629°N 5.829100°E | 63076-CLT-0003-01 Info | |
| Church of Saints-Hermès et Alexandre and the wall around the cemetery, two portals and their lattice work ^{(nl)} ^{(fr)} | | Theux | | 50.534049°N 5.811159°E | 63076-CLT-0004-01 Info | Kerk Saints-Hermès-et-Alexandre en de muur rond het kerkhof, twee portalen en hun roosterwerk More images |
| Factory named pavillon Felix Bernard ^{(nl)} ^{(fr)} | | Theux | la Heid de Spa, promenade Reikem | 50.490649°N 5.841382°E | 63076-CLT-0005-01 Info | |
| House ^{(nl)} ^{(fr)} | | Theux | rue Bouxherie n°1 | 50.532123°N 5.816231°E | 63076-CLT-0006-01 Info | |
| House: walls and roofs and part of the old smithy from the 17th century ^{(nl)} ^{(fr)} | | Theux | rue Bouxherie, n°2 | 50.531952°N 5.816464°E | 63076-CLT-0007-01 Info | |
| Building: front and rear facades, roofs and gable ^{(nl)} ^{(fr)} | | Theux | rue de la Chaussée n°46 | 50.534975°N 5.811978°E | 63076-CLT-0008-01 Info | |
| Building: front and rear facades, roofs ^{(nl)} ^{(fr)} | | Theux | rue de la Chaussée n°44 | 50.534975°N 5.812050°E | 63076-CLT-0009-01 Info | |
| Hospice Sainte-Josephine: main facade, front roof slope, except garage on the right ^{(nl)} ^{(fr)} | | Theux | rue de la Chaussée n°s 25-27 | 50.534692°N 5.812556°E | 63076-CLT-0010-01 Info | Hospice Sainte-Joséphine: hoofdgevel, dakhelling voorzijde, uitgezonderd garage aan de rechterzijde More images |
| House: main facade, front roof, gabled right parts in broken stonework higher than adjacent building ^{(nl)} ^{(fr)} | | Theux | place du Perron n°10 | 50.535326°N 5.813532°E | 63076-CLT-0011-01 Info | |
| House of Bailli: facades and roofs of the main building, two towers ^{(nl)} ^{(fr)} | | Theux | n°s 2-4, Marché | 50.527875°N 5.820563°E | 63076-CLT-0012-01 Info | Huis van Bailli: gevels en daken van het hoofdgebouw, twee torens |
| House of Boverie: facades and roofs including extensions ^{(nl)} ^{(fr)} | | Theux | rue Waillot n°5 | 50.533663°N 5.810021°E | 63076-CLT-0013-01 Info | |
| Chapel du Bon Air ^{(nl)} ^{(fr)} | | Theux | | 50.479708°N 5.778782°E | 63076-CLT-0014-01 Info | Kapel du Bon Air |
| House facades, roofs and left side gate ^{(nl)} ^{(fr)} | | Theux | rue Hovémont n°80 | 50.532486°N 5.814826°E | 63076-CLT-0015-01 Info | |
| Presbytery: facades and roofs, porch and parts of the walled square ^{(nl)} ^{(fr)} | | Theux | rue de la Chaussée, n°50 | 50.535249°N 5.811707°E | 63076-CLT-0016-01 Info | Pastorie: gevels en daken, portaal en delen van demuur aan het plein More images |
| Town hall ^{(nl)} ^{(fr)} | | Theux | rue de la Chaussée n°10 | 50.534931°N 5.813305°E | 63076-CLT-0017-01 Info | Raadhuis More images |
| House Del Heid: facades and roofs ^{(nl)} ^{(fr)} | | Theux | rue de la Chaussée n°31 | 50.534756°N 5.812293°E | 63076-CLT-0018-01 Info | Huis Del Heid: gevels en daken More images |
| House: main facade and front roof slope ^{(nl)} ^{(fr)} | | Theux | place du Perron n°12 | 50.535403°N 5.813478°E | 63076-CLT-0019-01 Info | Huis: hoofdgevel en voorzijde dakhelling |
| House called "maison Lebrun" ^{(nl)} ^{(fr)} | | Theux | place du Perron n°s 2-4 | 50.535068°N 5.813444°E | 63076-CLT-0020-01 Info | Huis genaamd "maison Lebrun" |
| Charmille du Haut-Marais in the hamlet of Hautregard and the ensemble of the arbor and its surroundings ^{(nl)} ^{(fr)} | | Theux | | 50.471214°N 5.777511°E | 63076-CLT-0021-01 Info | Charmille du Haut-Marais in het gehucht van Hautregard en het ensemble van het prieel en diens omgeving More images |
| Ruins of the castle-fortress of Franchimont: 14th, 15th and 16th centuries ^{(nl)} ^{(fr)} | | Theux | | 50.527673°N 5.824241°E | 63076-CLT-0022-01 Info | Ruïnes van het kasteel-fort van Franchimont: 14e, 15e en 16e eeuw More images |
| Organs of the church Saint-Roch ^{(nl)} ^{(fr)} | | Theux | | 50.556688°N 5.898728°E | 63076-CLT-0023-01 Info | |
| Old bridge of Polleur ^{(nl)} ^{(fr)} | | Theux | rue R. Bordure | 50.538289°N 5.881694°E | 63076-CLT-0024-01 Info | Oude brug van Polleur |
| Farm Chapelle: tower and ensemble of the farm, chapel of Bon Air and surrounding areas ^{(nl)} ^{(fr)} | | Theux | n°337 | 50.480326°N 5.778162°E | 63076-CLT-0025-01 Info | |
| Castle Hautregard: facades and roofs, except the southwest facade of the 19th century ^{(nl)} ^{(fr)} | | Theux | | 50.485382°N 5.770551°E | 63076-CLT-0026-01 Info | Kasteel van Hautregard: gevels en daken, uitgezonderd de zuidwestgevel uit de 19e eeuw |
| Farm of Haye: facades and roofs, surrounding wall, porch, two chimneys of the early 17th century, except for the recent additions ^{(nl)} ^{(fr)} | | Theux | | 50.517570°N 5.799477°E | 63076-CLT-0027-01 Info | Boerderij van Haye: gevels en daken, omliggende muur, portiek, twee schoorstenen van de vroege 17e eeuw, uitgezonderd de recente toevoegingen |
| Extending the classification of the site of Haldes calaminaires of Rocheux ^{(nl)} ^{(fr)} | | Theux | | 50.541580°N 5.831613°E | 63076-CLT-0028-01 Info | |
| Church tower and spire of Saint-Jacques, now Notre Dame ^{(nl)} ^{(fr)} | | Theux | | 50.539116°N 5.881110°E | 63076-CLT-0029-01 Info | Toren en spits van kerk Saint-Jacques, tegenwoordig kerk Notre-Dame More images |
| Thier du Gibet ^{(nl)} ^{(fr)} | | Theux | | 50.541384°N 5.818494°E | 63076-CLT-0031-01 Info | |
| Group of remarkable trees ^{(nl)} ^{(fr)} | | Theux | Basse Desnié | 50.461128°N 5.810130°E | 63076-CLT-0032-01 Info | Groep van opmerkelijke bomen |
| Ensemble of the chapel and its surroundings Fyon ^{(nl)} ^{(fr)} | | Theux | rue Rittweger n°228 | 50.548955°N 5.807645°E | 63076-CLT-0033-01 Info | |
| One-hundred-year-old walnut tree on the farm Marquisat ^{(nl)} ^{(fr)} | | Theux | | 50.532851°N 5.839552°E | 63076-CLT-0034-01 Info | |
| Perron ^{(nl)} ^{(fr)} | | Theux | place du Perron | 50.535333°N 5.813262°E | 63076-CLT-0035-01 Info | Bordes More images |
| Eight border posts of the marquisate of Franchimont in the country of Liege and the settlement of Louveigné, municipality of Stavelot ^{(nl)} ^{(fr)} | | Theux | | 50.528216°N 5.758792°E | 63076-CLT-0036-01 Info | |
| Protection of the donjon and the 16th-century ruins of the castle-fortress of Franchimont ^{(nl)} ^{(fr)} | | Theux | | 50.527673°N 5.824241°E | 63076-PEX-0001-01 Info | Bescherming van het donjon en de 16e-eeuwse ruïnes van het kasteel-fort van Franchimont |

== See also ==
- List of protected heritage sites in Liège (province)
