= Marquessate of Franchimont =

16th-/18th-century lordship in Prince-Bishopric of Liège

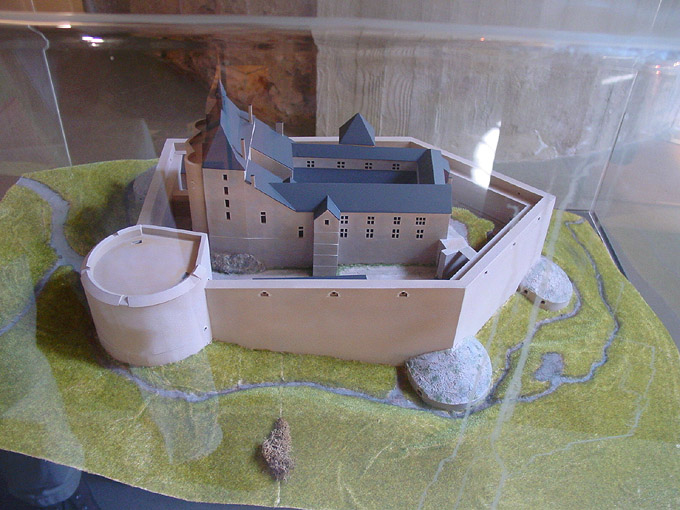
Model of Franchimont Castle showing outer wall added in early 16th century

The Marquessate of Franchimont was a lordship forming the western frontier of the Prince-Bishopric of Liège. Its base was Franchimont Castle. It was made up of the bans of Theux, Spa, Sart, Jalhay and later Verviers. The prince-bishops of Liège first took the title of marquis of Franchimont at the start of the 16th century, adding an outer wall to the castle.

Before the 1789 Liège Revolution, the Marquessate of Franchimont formed a small province within the Prince-Bishopric. This small province, six leagues long by four leagues wide, (Note: League is a measurement that has varied by locality and time period, such as ranging from 3.268 km to 5.849 km in different places in nearby France, prior to the start of the French Revolution in 1789. Using this as only a rough estimate, the Marquessate of Franchimont could range between 256 square kilometres (99 sq mi) and 821 square kilometres (317 sq mi), larger than the modern Brussels-Capital Region but smaller than the area on the eastern edge of modern Liège Province locally governed by the German-speaking Community of Belgium.) was bounded in by the Duchy of Limburg (to the east), the Duchy of Luxemburg (fragmented, to the south and the west) and the Princely Abbey of Stavelot-Malmedy (fragmented, to the south and the northwest).

The Marquessate was divided into five bans, whose capitals or burghs were:

- The ban of Theux (head-ban) with Oneux, La Reid, Polleur, Jehanster and Franchimont
- The ban of Verviers with Stembert, Ensival and Andrimont
- The ban of Jalhay
- The ban of Sart
- The ban of Spa

In all, it comprised around fifty villages and hamlets.
