= Gustave Fischweiler =

Belgian sculptor

- Born: 18 December 1911; Saint-Servais, Belgium
- Died: 1990 (aged 78–79); Brussels, Belgium
- Occupation: Sculptor

Gustave Emmanuel Joseph Marie Fischweiler (18 December 1911 – 1990) was a Belgian sculptor. His work was part of the sculpture event in the art competition at the 1936 Summer Olympics.

== Education ==
Gustave studied at the Academy of Fine Arts of Namur from 1925-29, and then at the Royal Academy of Fine Arts in Brussels from 1929-32.

From 1932-33, he served with the 13th Regiment line in Namur.
