= Perron (columnar monument) =

Type of monument

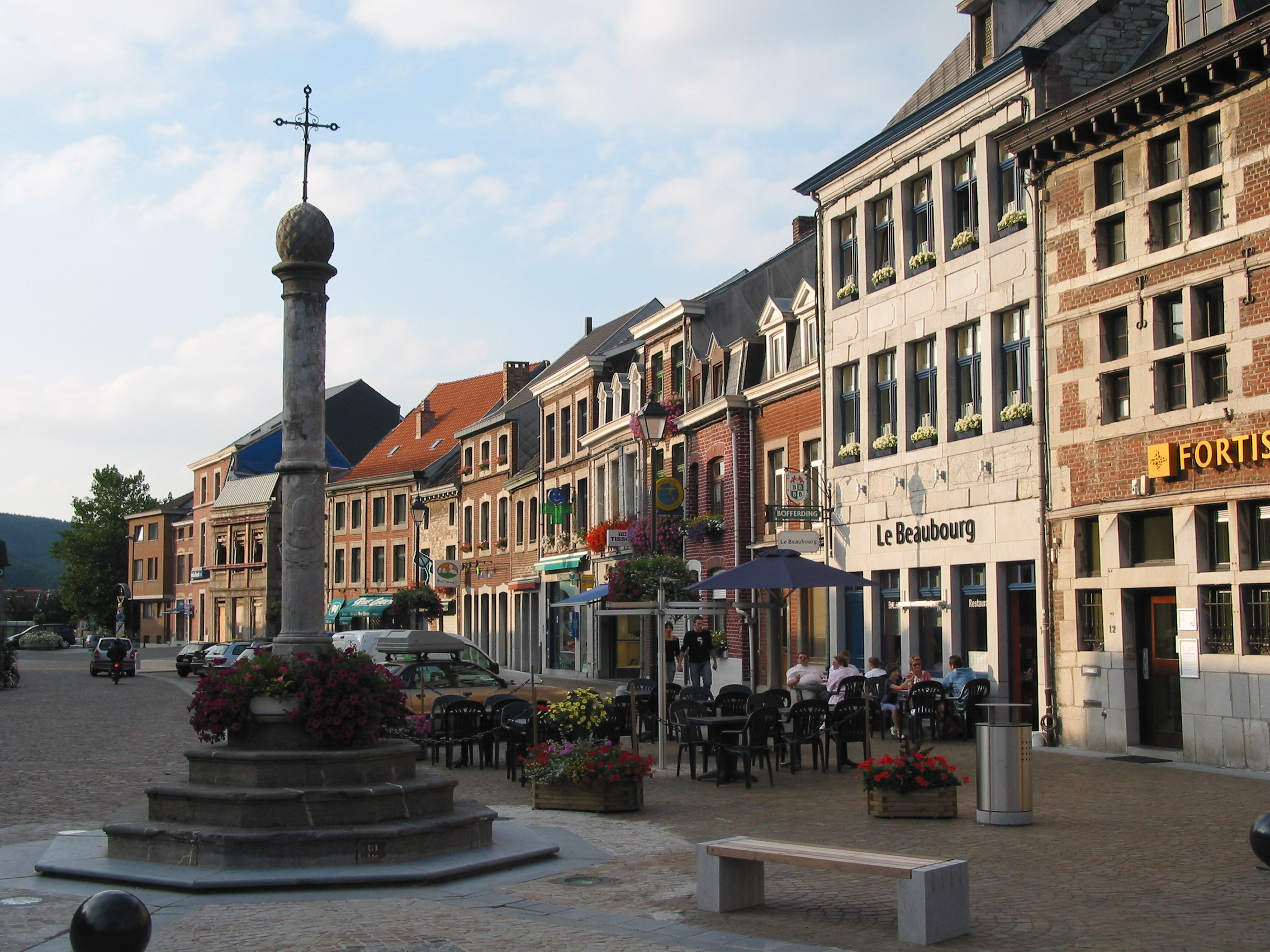
The perron at Theux

A perron (in French; also Dutch: perroen) is a stone column, often decorated with a cross-bearing orb (globus cruciger), common in many towns and cities in modern-day Belgium that formerly belonged to the Prince-Bishopric of Liège (980-1795). They were primarily built in the so-called Good Cities (Bonnes Villes or Goede Steden) that formed the primary urban settlements in the polity. Many survive, although not in their original form. Perrons were also built in the smaller Principality of Stavelot-Malmedy.

The columns came to symbolise civic freedom and autonomy (initially bishopric autonomy, later urban autonomy). This stemmed from their function as places where laws were proclaimed and justice was administered. However, the actual origin of the symbols of the column is unclear, with analogies made with the ancient pillories. In 1467, after recapturing the rebellious city of Liège, Charles the Bold, Duke of Burgundy, had the Perron of Liège dismantled and removed to Bruges, not to be returned until after his death. This was "viewed both as a punishment of the people of Liège and as a clear warning to any Flemish subjects who might be tempted to question the duke's authority".

== Perrons and the Prince-Bishopric of Liege ==
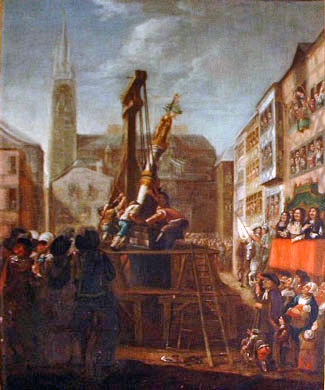
The re-erection of the Perron of Liège, as a symbol of local autonomy, in 1478 after the end of Burgundian rule.

The former cities of the prince-bishrophic where perrons have been built are nowadays located in multiple regions and provinces of Belgium, in addition to one in the Netherlands (that of Maastricht, which was a condominium of the prince-bishopric and the Duchy of Brabant during the Middle Ages).

=== Limburg Province (Belgium) ===
Town	Picture
Limburg Province (Belgium)
Bilzen	
Borgloon	
Bree	
Herk-de-Stad	
Hamont	
Maaseik	
Montenaken	
Sint-Truiden	
Stokkem	
Tongeren	

=== Liège Province (Belgium) ===
Town	Picture
Liège Province (Belgium)
Herve	
Huy	
Liège	
Sart-lez-Spa	
Stavelot	
Theux	
Verviers	
Villers-l'Évêque	
Visé	

=== Limburg Province (Netherlands) ===
Town	Picture
The Netherlands
Maastricht	

== On coats of arms ==
A perron is featured in the coat of arms of the city of Liège and has become a badge of the city. The design is also featured on the cap badge of Belgium's 12th Regiment of the Line.

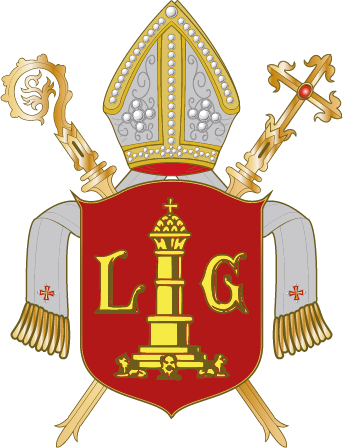
Coat of arms of the Prince-Bishopric of Liège

Coat of arms of Liège

Coat of arms de Sint-Truiden

Coat of arms of Châtelet

== See also ==
- Market cross, a similar monument type in Britain
- Roland statue, another type of traditional civic monument, particularly in Germany
