= List of protected heritage sites in Verviers =

This table shows an overview of the protected heritage sites in the Walloon town Verviers. This list is part of Belgium's national heritage.

Object	Year/architect	Town/section	Address	Coordinates	Number^{?}	Image
Church of Notre-Dame. except the tower ^{(nl)} ^{(fr)}		Verviers		50.593831°N 5.859699°E	63079-CLT-0001-01 Info	Kerk Notre-Dame. uitgezonderd de toren
Orphanage for girls, from the 18th century ^{(nl)} ^{(fr)}		Verviers		50.594530°N 5.864009°E	63079-CLT-0002-01 Info	Weeshuis voor meisjes, uit de 18e eeuw
Town hall ^{(nl)} ^{(fr)}		Verviers	place du Marché	50.593126°N 5.867515°E	63079-CLT-0003-01 Info	Raadhuis
Monumental fountain of Perron ^{(nl)} ^{(fr)}		Verviers	Place du Marché	50.593077°N 5.867183°E	63079-CLT-0004-01 Info	Monumentale fontein van Perron
Facades and roof of the building ^{(nl)} ^{(fr)}		Verviers	Rue des Raines n°42	50.594717°N 5.868538°E	63079-CLT-0006-01 Info	Gevels en dak van het gebouw
House Lambrette: facades and roofs ^{(nl)} ^{(fr)}		Verviers	rue des Raines n°82	50.594603°N 5.866317°E	63079-CLT-0007-01 Info	Huis Lambrette: gevels en daken
Former hotel Raymond Biolley ^{(nl)} ^{(fr)}		Verviers	place Sommeleville n°s 28-34	50.594249°N 5.872488°E	63079-CLT-0008-01 Info	Voormalig hotel Raymond van Biolley
Church of Saint Remacle ^{(nl)} ^{(fr)}		Verviers		50.594945°N 5.870489°E	63079-CLT-0010-01 Info	Kerk Saint-Remacle
House called "maison Moulan" ^{(nl)} ^{(fr)}		Verviers	Crapaurue n° 39	50.592736°N 5.865874°E	63079-CLT-0011-01 Info	Huis genaamd "maison Moulan"
Furniture of the Church of Saint Joseph (demolished) ^{(nl)} ^{(fr)}		Verviers		50.591646°N 5.865958°E	63079-CLT-0012-01 Info	
House ^{(nl)} ^{(fr)}		Verviers	rue Bouxhate n°12	50.594267°N 5.869924°E	63079-CLT-0013-01 Info	Huis
House: main facade and roof ^{(nl)} ^{(fr)}		Verviers	rue Jules Cerexhe n°s 22-24	50.593906°N 5.850618°E	63079-CLT-0014-01 Info	Huis: hoofdgevel en dak
Building: walls and roof ^{(nl)} ^{(fr)}		Verviers	rue de la chapelle n° 24	50.595644°N 5.851154°E	63079-CLT-0015-01 Info	Gebouw: gevels en dak
House facades and roof ^{(nl)} ^{(fr)}		Verviers	Place Saucy n°s 138-140-142	50.593668°N 5.851770°E	63079-CLT-0016-01 Info	Huis: gevels en dak
House facades and roof ^{(nl)} ^{(fr)}		Verviers	place Sommeleville n°6	50.593958°N 5.871024°E	63079-CLT-0017-01 Info	
House: main facade and roof ^{(nl)} ^{(fr)}		Verviers	rue des Raines n°s 50-52	50.594627°N 5.868098°E	63079-CLT-0018-01 Info	Huis: hoofdgevel en dak
House: walls and roofs ^{(nl)} ^{(fr)}		Verviers	rue des Raines n° 80	50.594592°N 5.866546°E	63079-CLT-0019-01 Info	Huis: gevels en daken
House: main facade and roof ^{(nl)} ^{(fr)}		Verviers	rue Sécheval n° 61	50.593880°N 5.870073°E	63079-CLT-0020-01 Info	
Mansion: building facades and roof ^{(nl)} ^{(fr)}		Verviers	Thier Mère-Dieu n° 18	50.593023°N 5.868613°E	63079-CLT-0021-01 Info	Herenhuis: gevels en dak hoofdgebouw
House: main facade and roof ^{(nl)} ^{(fr)}		Verviers	rue des Raines n° 17	50.594527°N 5.868886°E	63079-CLT-0023-01 Info	Huis: hoofdgevel en dak
House facades and roof ^{(nl)} ^{(fr)}		Verviers	chaussée de Heusy n°s 16-18	50.590725°N 5.866720°E	63079-CLT-0024-01 Info	Huis: gevels en dak
Organs of the church Saint-Remacle ^{(nl)} ^{(fr)}		Verviers		50.595053°N 5.871135°E	63079-CLT-0026-01 Info	
Ensemble of the park the société d'Harmonie and its building ^{(nl)} ^{(fr)}		Verviers		50.589909°N 5.855917°E	63079-CLT-0030-01 Info	Ensemble van het park het société d'Harmonie en diens gebouw
Facades and roofs, ballroom, final fence of the park to the building of Société Royale d'Harmonie ^{(nl)} ^{(fr)}		Verviers		50.591437°N 5.855451°E	63079-CLT-0031-01 Info	Gevels en daken, balzaal, afsluitend hekwerk van het park van het gebouw van Société Royale d'Harmonie
Kiosk in the park Société Royale d'Harmonie ^{(nl)} ^{(fr)}		Verviers		50.590958°N 5.854986°E	63079-CLT-0032-01 Info	Kiosk in het park Société Royale d'Harmonie
House ^{(nl)} ^{(fr)}		Verviers	Place Sommeleville n° 4	50.593965°N 5.871092°E	63079-CLT-0034-01 Info	Huis
Facades and roofs of the factory Bettonville ^{(nl)} ^{(fr)}		Verviers	rue Chapelle n° 30	50.595877°N 5.851222°E	63079-CLT-0035-01 Info	Gevels en daken van de fabriek Bettonville
Declassificationof the facade and the south side of the roof of the old orphanage, with the exception of the front portal, including carved stone with the arms of the city, and above the keystone of the arch with the names of mayors, which will be carefully removed and incorporated into the new building on the site of the former orphanage ^{(nl)} ^{(fr)}		Verviers	rue de Limbourg n°19	50.595276°N 5.873558°E	63079-CLT-0036-02 Info	Declassement van de gevel en de zuidzijde van het dak van het oude weeshuis, met uitzondering van de voorste portaal, waaronder bewerkte stenen met het wapen van de stad, erboven en de sleutel van de boog met de namen van burgemeesters, die zorgvuldig zullen worden verwijderd en opgenomen in de nieuwbouw op de plaats van het voormalige weeshuis
Entrance Porch ^{(nl)} ^{(fr)}		Verviers	rue de la Chapelle n° 30	50.595592°N 5.850825°E	63079-CLT-0038-01 Info	Entreeportiek
House: main facade and roof front ^{(nl)} ^{(fr)}		Verviers	rue de la Chapelle n° 26	50.595621°N 5.851018°E	63079-CLT-0039-01 Info	Huis: hoofdgevel en dak voorzijde
House: main facade and roof front ^{(nl)} ^{(fr)}		Verviers	rue de la Chapelle n° 28	50.595614°N 5.850918°E	63079-CLT-0040-01 Info	Huis: hoofdgevel en dak voorzijde
House: main facade and roof front ^{(nl)} ^{(fr)}		Verviers	rue de la Chapelle n° 32	50.595591°N 5.850735°E	63079-CLT-0041-01 Info	Huis: hoofdgevel en dak voorzijde
Chapel of Saint-Lambert: facades, roofs, cladding and furniture of the building ^{(nl)} ^{(fr)}		Verviers	rue du Collège et rue Masson	50.594289°N 5.863275°E	63079-CLT-0042-01 Info	Kapel Saint-Lambert: gevels, daken, bekleding en meubilair van het gebouw
Park ^{(nl)} ^{(fr)}		Verviers	rue Moreau, Ensival	50.585558°N 5.842075°E	63079-CLT-0045-01 Info	
Organs of the church Saint-Jean Baptiste ^{(nl)} ^{(fr)}		Verviers	Hodimont	50.595380°N 5.850847°E	63079-CLT-0048-01 Info	
The seven stations of the Calvary of the 17th century, near the cemetery Lambermont ^{(nl)} ^{(fr)}		Verviers		50.590727°N 5.823667°E	63079-CLT-0049-01 Info	
Facades and roofs of the house ^{(nl)} ^{(fr)}		Verviers	Francomont n° 7	50.583665°N 5.837579°E	63079-CLT-0051-01 Info	
House: walls and roofs ^{(nl)} ^{(fr)}		Verviers	place M. Collo n° 7	50.590999°N 5.831389°E	63079-CLT-0052-01 Info	
House: walls and roofs ^{(nl)} ^{(fr)}		Verviers	rue Francomont n°4-6	50.582883°N 5.838132°E	63079-CLT-0053-01 Info	
House: main facade, gables and roofs ^{(nl)} ^{(fr)}		Verviers	rue des Déportés n°s 12-14 (tegenwoordig rue Saint-Bernard)	50.590406°N 5.831374°E	63079-CLT-0055-01 Info	
House ^{(nl)} ^{(fr)}		Verviers	rue des Déportés n°63, tegenwoordig rue Saint-Bernard n° 63	50.591443°N 5.832187°E	63079-CLT-0056-01 Info	
Society Saint-Bernard ^{(nl)} ^{(fr)}		Verviers	rue des Déportés n°32, tegenwoordig rue Saint-Bernard n° 32	50.590864°N 5.831839°E	63079-CLT-0057-01 Info	
Old farm: facades and roofs ^{(nl)} ^{(fr)}		Verviers	rue Francomont n° 3	50.584017°N 5.837866°E	63079-CLT-0058-01 Info	
Ensemble of the rue Mont Franco ^{(nl)} ^{(fr)}		Verviers		50.585566°N 5.836504°E	63079-CLT-0059-01 Info	
Farm of Belle Maison ^{(nl)} ^{(fr)}		Verviers	Thier de Hodimont n°s 41-43	50.601182°N 5.836996°E	63079-CLT-0061-01 Info	
House and half-timbered gable ^{(nl)} ^{(fr)}		Verviers	place du Perron n° 6	50.590703°N 5.895386°E	63079-CLT-0062-01 Info	
House: walls, roof and porch ^{(nl)} ^{(fr)}		Verviers	rue de l'Eglise n° 8	50.591427°N 5.895101°E	63079-CLT-0063-01 Info	
Old parts of the farm Moinerie ^{(nl)} ^{(fr)}		Verviers	rue de la Moinerie n°s 52-54	50.610432°N 5.833207°E	63079-CLT-0064-01 Info	
Farm Doyen: facades and roofs ^{(nl)} ^{(fr)}		Verviers	avenue Florent Becker n° 77	50.582628°N 5.886973°E	63079-CLT-0065-01 Info	
Crucifix beside the cafe Bourse ^{(nl)} ^{(fr)}		Verviers	rue Xhavée n° 2	50.592177°N 5.860171°E	63079-CLT-0066-01 Info	Kruisbeeld naast het café van Bourse
Former textile workshops: facades end tasks ^{(nl)} ^{(fr)}		Verviers	rue Jules Cerexhe n° 86 (+ Rue Pétaheid n°s 15-17)	50.594332°N 5.848542°E	63079-CLT-0067-01 Info	Voormalige textiel-ateliers: gevels end aken
Building ^{(nl)} ^{(fr)}		Verviers	Rue Bouxhate n° 3	50.594043°N 5.869100°E	63079-CLT-0068-01 Info	Gebouw
House ^{(nl)} ^{(fr)}		Verviers	Place du Marché n° 7	50.593524°N 5.866895°E	63079-CLT-0069-01 Info	Huis
House ^{(nl)} ^{(fr)}		Verviers	rue de Mangombroux n° 297-299, tegenwoordig rue Ma Campagne n°s 297-299	50.587046°N 5.876622°E	63079-CLT-0070-01 Info	Huis
Old Office ('Octroi') ^{(nl)} ^{(fr)}		Verviers	rue de la Grappe, n° 42	50.597291°N 5.852440°E	63079-CLT-0071-01 Info	
Old house of Edouard de Biolley ^{(nl)} ^{(fr)}		Verviers	place Sommeleville n° 8	50.593961°N 5.871260°E	63079-CLT-0072-01 Info	Oud huis van Edouard de Biolley
Cross for the building ^{(nl)} ^{(fr)}		Verviers	rue Francomont n° 4	50.582734°N 5.838046°E	63079-CLT-0073-01 Info	
Castle Barracks: facades and roofs ^{(nl)} ^{(fr)}		Verviers	allée du Château n°21	50.615732°N 5.833220°E	63079-CLT-0074-01 Info	
House facades end tasks ^{(nl)} ^{(fr)}		Verviers	rue Jules Cerexhe n°s 78-80	50.594298°N 5.848911°E	63079-CLT-0075-01 Info	Huis: gevels end aken
House: walls and roofs ^{(nl)} ^{(fr)}		Verviers	rue Jules Cerexhe n°s 98-100-102	50.594320°N 5.848059°E	63079-CLT-0076-01 Info	Huizen: gevels en daken
Statue of the Virgin and the recessed niche in the gable of an outbuilding belonging to the Société de Peignage et de Filature the Laines ^{(nl)} ^{(fr)}		Verviers	place Sommeleville	50.594356°N 5.872657°E	63079-CLT-0077-01 Info	
House: walls and roofs ^{(nl)} ^{(fr)}		Verviers	rue Jules Cerexhe n° 84	50.594315°N 5.848648°E	63079-CLT-0078-01 Info	Huis: gevels en daken
House façade, roof and rear ^{(nl)} ^{(fr)}		Verviers	rue Jules Cerexhe n°42	50.594059°N 5.850052°E	63079-CLT-0079-01 Info	Huis: voorgevel en dak en achtergevel
House: walls and roofs ^{(nl)} ^{(fr)}		Verviers	Rue des Raines n° 72	50.594578°N 5.867093°E	63079-CLT-0080-01 Info	Huis: gevels en daken
Ensemble of the houses ^{(nl)} ^{(fr)}		Verviers	rue de l'Eglise n°s 5-7-9-11 en 11A, te Ensival, tegenwoordig in Mi-Ville n°s 23 à 31	50.581573°N 5.840815°E	63079-CLT-0081-01 Info	Ensemble van de huizen
House: Part of the facade with its original character ^{(nl)} ^{(fr)}		Verviers	rue du Canal n° 3	50.579678°N 5.842866°E	63079-CLT-0082-01 Info	
House facade and roof ^{(nl)} ^{(fr)}		Verviers	Rue des Weines n° 33	50.582894°N 5.838994°E	63079-CLT-0083-01 Info	
House facades and roofs ^{(nl)} ^{(fr)}		Verviers	rue Jules Cerexhe n° 10	50.593800°N 5.850949°E	63079-CLT-0084-01 Info	Huis: gevel en daken
House facades and roofs ^{(nl)} ^{(fr)}		Verviers	rue Jules Cerexhe n° 12	50.593821°N 5.850880°E	63079-CLT-0085-01 Info	Huis: gevel en daken
House: main facade and roof ^{(nl)} ^{(fr)}		Verviers	Grand-Place n° 37	50.581585°N 5.838952°E	63079-CLT-0086-01 Info	
House: walls and roofs ^{(nl)} ^{(fr)}		Verviers	rue de Hodimont n° 63	50.593837°N 5.854017°E	63079-CLT-0087-01 Info	
House: walls and roofs ^{(nl)} ^{(fr)}		Verviers	rue de Limbourg n° 33	50.595965°N 5.875612°E	63079-CLT-0088-01 Info	Huis: gevels en daken
Building: walls and roofs, the surrounding wall and the portal aanslutiend at n ° 3 a ^{(nl)} ^{(fr)}		Verviers	rue Francomont n° 1	50.583897°N 5.837883°E	63079-CLT-0090-01 Info	
Bridge of Al Cute and the ensemble of the bridge, the bed of the Vesdre and its banks, about 100 m upstream and downstream ^{(nl)} ^{(fr)}		Verviers		50.595756°N 5.867158°E	63079-CLT-0093-01 Info	
Ensemble of the cross of grandes Rames, the fencing around it and the group of trees that shade it ^{(nl)} ^{(fr)}		Verviers		50.596019°N 5.870723°E	63079-CLT-0094-01 Info	Ensemble van het kruis van grandes Rames, het hekwerk er omheen en de groep van de bomen die schaduw geeft
Facade and roof of the house ^{(nl)} ^{(fr)}		Verviers	rue des Raines n°44	50.594652°N 5.868307°E	63079-CLT-0095-01 Info	Gevel en dak van het huis
Facades and roofs of the ensemble of the house on rue des Raines, n ° 6 and the buildings at the yard and continued on the rue des Allies n ° 13 ^{(nl)} ^{(fr)}		Verviers	rue des Raines n°6	50.595102°N 5.869101°E	63079-CLT-0097-01 Info	Gevels en daken van het ensemble van het huis op rue des Raines, n°6 en de gebouwen aan de binnenplaats en verolgen aan de rue des Alliés n° 13
Facades and roofs of the building ^{(nl)} ^{(fr)}		Verviers	rue Francomont 3 bis	50.583965°N 5.837566°E	63079-CLT-0099-01 Info	
Grand Mission: facades, roofs, porch entrance, stairs and small and large towers, lobby ^{(nl)} ^{(fr)}		Verviers	rue du Collège n° 3	50.594319°N 5.864857°E	63079-CLT-0100-01 Info	Grand-Poste: gevels, daken, veranda entree, trappen en kleine en grote torens, lobby
Facades facing the street or the courtyard and the roofs of all n ° s 27 to 33, 47 and 51 to 55 of the rue de la Chapelle and n ° s 6 and 8 of the rue des Messieurs, except for the workshop and n ° 47 of the depot, the surrounding wall of No. 53, and the construction at the porch of No. 8 and the total paved courtyard ^{(nl)} ^{(fr)}		Verviers		50.594974°N 5.851715°E	63079-CLT-0104-01 Info	Gevels met uitzicht op de straat of de binnenplaats en de alle daken van n°s 27 tot 33, 47 en 51 tot 55 van de rue de la Chapelle en de n°s 6 en 8 van de rue des Messieurs, uitgezonderd de werkplaats en de remise van n° 47, de omliggende muur van n°53, en de aanbouw bij de veranda van n°8, en de totale geplaveide binnenplaats
Former stables Simonis: Head northeast facade, gables and roof ^{(nl)} ^{(fr)}		Verviers	rue de l'Est n°s 8-12	50.595131°N 5.875209°E	63079-CLT-0105-01 Info	Voormalige stallen Simonis: noordoost hoofdgevel, puntgevels en dak
Park Seroule ^{(nl)} ^{(fr)}		Verviers		50.579205°N 5.855175°E	63079-CLT-0106-01 Info	Park van Séroule
Park Goddess ^{(nl)} ^{(fr)}		Verviers		50.583574°N 5.840360°E	63079-CLT-0108-01 Info	
Le Grand Théâtre ^{(nl)} ^{(fr)}		Verviers	rue du Théatre 1	50.590111°N 5.856991°E	63079-CLT-0111-01 Info	Le Grand Théâtre
Tower of the church of Sainte-Vierge, today of the Assumption ^{(nl)} ^{(fr)}		Verviers	Ensival	50.581418°N 5.841909°E	63079-CLT-0112-01 Info	Toren van de kerk Sainte-Vierge, tegenwoordig Assomption
Raised landing on the square Xhovémont ^{(nl)} ^{(fr)}		Verviers	Petit-Rechain	50.614316°N 5.834227°E	63079-CLT-0113-01 Info	
Valley of Fierain ^{(nl)} ^{(fr)}		Verviers		50.588939°N 5.823503°E	63079-CLT-0114-01 Info	
Certain parts of the old school of Nursing; facade on the main road, the rear overlooking the courtyard, the roof, the courtyard with glass roof and the interior; establishment of a protection zone (ZP) ^{(nl)} ^{(fr)}		Verviers	rue des Ecoles 17-19	50.590204°N 5.865102°E	63079-CLT-0116-01 Info	Bepaalde delen van de oude school voor verpleegkunde: gevel van de hoofdweg, de achtergevel met uitzicht op de binnenplaats en daken, de binnenplaats met glazen dak en het interieur en oprichting een beschermingszone
Street Facades and roofs of the house and its outbuilding Maison du Prince ^{(nl)} ^{(fr)}		Verviers	rue de la Tuilerie n°2	50.593802°N 5.867583°E	63079-CLT-0118-01 Info	Straatgevels en de daken van het huis Maison du Prince en diens bijgebouw
House facade and roof ^{(nl)} ^{(fr)}		Verviers	rue Jules Cerexhe n°44	50.594079°N 5.849967°E	63079-CLT-0119-01 Info	Huis: voorgevel en dak
House facade and roof ^{(nl)} ^{(fr)}		Verviers	rue Jules Cerexhe n°46	50.594084°N 5.849926°E	63079-CLT-0120-01 Info	
Facade and roof of house ^{(nl)} ^{(fr)}		Verviers	rue des Raines n°46	50.594645°N 5.868306°E	63079-CLT-0121-01 Info	
Facade and roof of house ^{(nl)} ^{(fr)}		Verviers	rue des Raines n°48	50.594630°N 5.868196°E	63079-CLT-0122-01 Info	Gevel en dak van huis
Town hall ^{(nl)} ^{(fr)}		Verviers		50.593126°N 5.867515°E	63079-PEX-0001-01 Info	

== See also ==
- List of protected heritage sites in Liège (province)
- Verviers
