= Iwan Simonis =

Belgian entrepreneur who was involved in mechanizing the textile industry

- Born: 6 January 1769; Verviers, Prince-Bishopric of Liège, Holy Roman Empire
- Died: 13 January 1829 (aged 60); Verviers, Province of Liège, Kingdom of the Netherlands
- Occupations: Entrepreneur, industrialist
- Spouse: Marie Agnès de Grand’Ry
- Parents: Jacques Joseph Simonis; Marie-Agnès-Dieudonnée de Franquinet

Iwan Simonis (full name Jean-François Dieudonné Simonis) was an entrepreneur and industrialist who was involved in the first introduction of machines to the production of textiles in Belgium. He was born to Jacques Joseph Simonis and Marie-Agnès-Dieudonnée de Franquinet in 1769. His family owned the textile firm Simonis et Biolley, after a merger resulting when his sister Marie Anne Simonis married Jean-François Biolley.

Iwan Simonis, a modern descendant of the 17th-century company, bears Simonis' name. It is known for producing billiard cloth, although it no longer produces cloth for most other uses.

== John Cockerill and Textile Mechanization ==
Verviers and its surroundings produced high-quality textiles in the 17th and 18th centuries, by the end of which cottage industry gradually gave way to work in localized manufactories. In 1799, Iwan Simonis arranged to pay British entrepreneur William Cockerill to construct spinning machines and other textile-production devices in a factory in Verviers, the first step towards machine factories taken in the region. After the machines proved effective, in 1801, Simonis was recognized by the firm with a bonus of 20,000 francs.
