= William Cockerill =

English inventor who spread Industrial Revolution

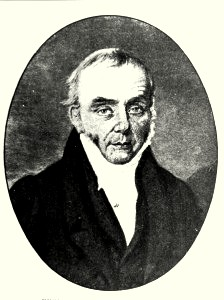
- Born: 1759; Lancashire, England
- Died: 1832 (aged 73); Aachen, Prussia
- Citizenship: British after 1810 French (Belgian)
- Occupations: Inventor, machine maker, industrialist
- Awards: Legion of Honour – (1807)

William Cockerill (1759–1832) was an English inventor, entrepreneur, and industrialist. Designing and producing machines for new industrial textile manufacturing, he is best known for having established a major manufacturing firm in what is now Liège Province of modern-day Belgium. He is widely considered to have been instrumental in spreading the Industrial Revolution in Continental Europe.

== Biography ==
William Cockerill was born in Haslingden, Lancashire in 1759, but little is known about his early life. He initially worked as a blacksmith in England and was said to be exceptionally skilled as a mechanical engineer and model maker. He was probably married in this period but enjoyed little commercial success.

=== Russia and Sweden ===
Cockerill was recommended to the Empress Catherine the Great as a skilled craftsman and settled in Saint Petersburg in the Russian Empire in 1794. However, his prospects of advancement collapsed after Catherine's death in 1796. Her successor, Paul I, imprisoned him after he failed to complete a model on time. Cockerill escaped to the Kingdom of Sweden where he was employed as an engineer, constructing canal locks. However, civil engineering did not suit him. Cockerill heard of the wool industry emerging around the city of Liège in modern-day Belgium which had recently been occupied by France. Although the French Revolutionary Wars were still ongoing, Cockerill decided that his prospects would be better there as a machine-maker. At Hamburg, he offered to return to England rather than help the French if he was awarded a pension in exchange. However, he heard nothing and after six months arrived in the Low Countries where he travelled to Amsterdam and then the pays de Liège.

=== Belgium ===
Cockerill began work in Verviers, near Liège, in 1799. His work involved manufacturing machines for the spinning and carding of wool for the firm Simonis et Biolley, run by Iwan Simonis and his sister Marie Anne Simonis. He then brought his family from England and settled in Belgium. The region was part of the French Republic during the French Revolutionary Wars, but this did not affect Cockerill's economic fortunes. He was joined in 1802 by James Holden who initially worked for him as an assistant and later set up his own business.

In 1807 Cockerill moved to the city of Liège and set up a machine building factory there with his three sons. In 1807 he was awarded the Legion of Honour by Napoleon for his services to manufacturing. He became a French citizen in 1810 and, in 1813, imported a Watt steam engine. Cockerill's success grew during the Napoleonic blockade when Continental Europe was effectively cut off from English industrial products. His factory became famous, with half its machines exported to France. William Cockerill became tremendously rich and retired in 1813, passing his business to his son John Cockerill.

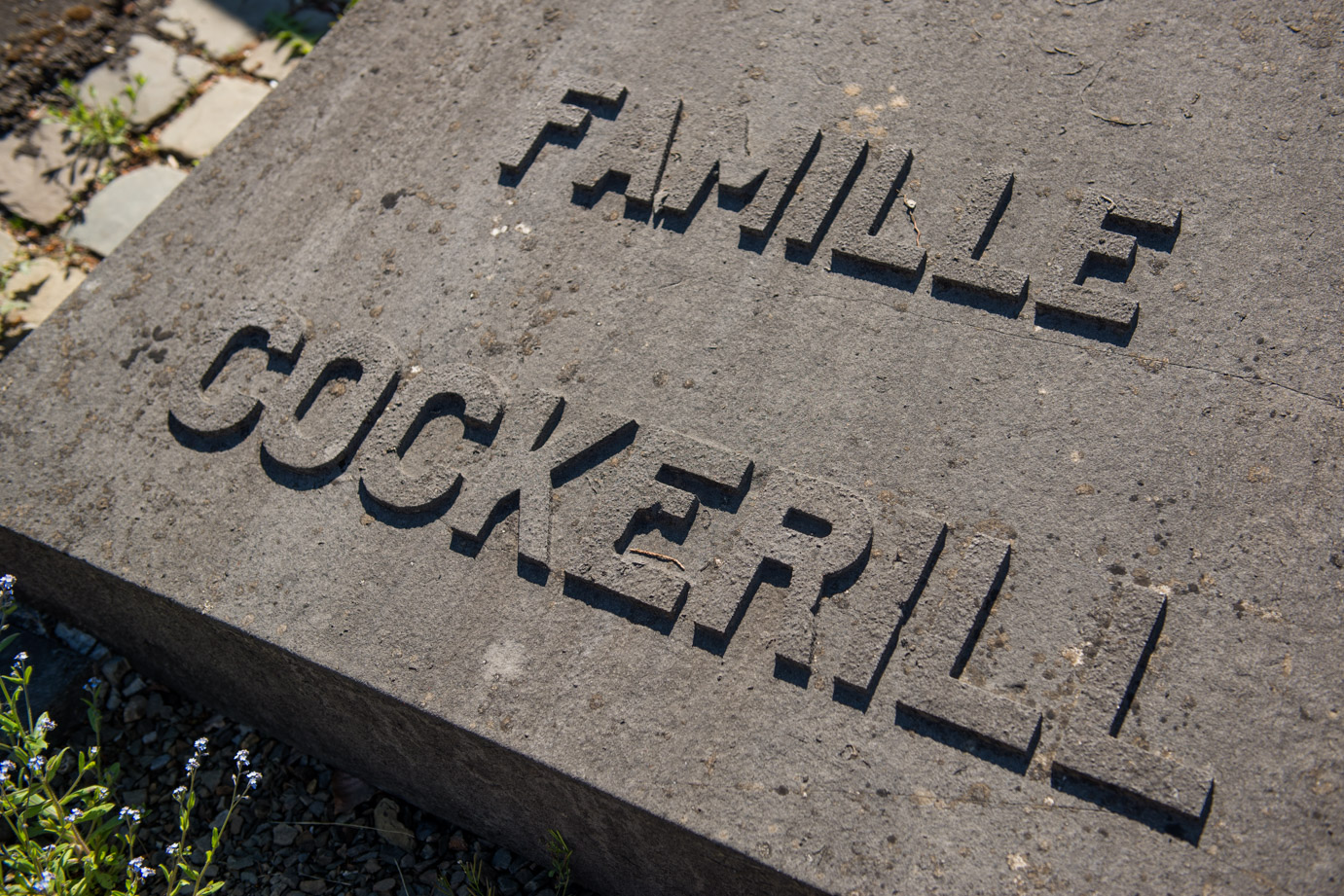
Cockerill family's tomb in the Spa cemetery

William Cockerill died at Schloss Berensberg (the home of his son Charles James) in Aachen, Prussia in 1832. He was buried in the family tomb in the Belgian town of Spa.

== Children ==
William Cockerill had three sons: William, James Cockerill, and John Cockerill. He also had a daughter, Nancy, who married James Hodson.

== See also ==
- Lieven Bauwens – a Belgian contemporary of Cockerill's who illegally imported an English spinning mule to Flanders in 1798.

== Sources ==
- Robert Chambers; William Chambers (1835). "William Cockerill". Chambers's Edinburgh Journal. 3. Orr and Smith: 64.

also similar work, with an extended account of the meeting with Napoleon:
- "A Lancashire-Man and Napoleon". The Casket, Flowers of Literature, Wit and Sentiment. Sam C. Atkinson: 515–517. 1829.

- Robert Chambers; William Chambers (1840). "The Cockerills". Chambers's Edinburgh Journal. 8. W. Orr: 165–166.

Similar biography also at either:
- Nursey, Perry Fairfax (1839). "The Cockerills of Liege". Iron: An Illustrated Weekly Journal for Iron and Steel Manufacturers, Metallurgists, Mine Proprietors, Engineers, Shipbuilders, Scientists, Capitalists... 31: 335–336.
- "The Cockerills of Liege". The Mechanics' Magazine, Museum, Register, Journal and Gazette. 31: 335–336. 6 April – 28 September 1839.

- Lance Day; Ian McNeil (2003). Biographical Dictionary of the History of Technology. Routledge. Cockerill, William, pp. 280–281. ISBN 9780415193993.
- W.O. Henderson (2006). The Industrial Revolution on the Continent: Germany, France, Russia 1800-1914. Taylor & Francis. ISBN 9780415382021.
- Adriaan Linters (1986). Industria: architecture industrielle en Belgique (in French, Dutch, and English). Mauad Editora Ltda. ISBN 9782870092842.
- "Cockerill, William (1759-1832)". cartage.org.lb. Archived from the original on 15 March 2012.
- Goodwin, Gordon (1887). "Cockerill, William" . In Stephen, Leslie (ed.). Dictionary of National Biography. Vol. 11. London: Smith, Elder & Co. p. 200.
