= Insoumise et dévoilée =

- Author: Karima
- Language: French
- Genre: Autobiography
- Publisher: Editions Azimuts, Luc Pire
- Publication date: March 2008
- Publication place: Belgium

Insoumise et dévoilée (Unsubmissive and unveiled) is an autobiography by Karima, published in 2008.

== Plot summary ==
Insoumise et devoilée is the story of Karima, a 32-year-old Muslim woman from Belgium who talks about her life and her violent education, from her childhood to her forced wedding in Morocco. She was beaten by her father to get her to follow their conservative traditions. This book was a real catharsis for the young woman. She broke the silence, but was threatened with murder even before the release of the book. The Muslim community of Verviers wanted to stop her from releasing the book and took her to court.

== The trial ==
On 18 March 2008, the family of Karima (her parents and two sisters) took her to court. They wanted to ban the book, forbid its sale or get some parts removed. A petition circulated in Verviers against Insoumise et dévoilée. People talked about "hchouma" (the shame) that the book would have spread. She answered: "I am zen, because all these threats, all these pressures, I knew that all my life". On 8 April, the court gave permission to the author to carry on selling the book. The judgment said that the story was a testimony of her whole life, not only focused on the family. "It's a victory for me but also for the girls who live the same," says Karima.

In August 2008, a second trial to change the publisher arrived. She changed to Luc Pire.

== The association ==
On 27 June 2008, Karima founded her association "Insoumise et dévoilée" to help women who got the same experiences. She organized travels to Morocco to prove to politicians the difference between Muslim women in Belgium and women in Morocco.

== The prizes ==
In September 2008 : the prize " Le Prix Condorcet-Aron " .

In November 2009 : the prize " Le Prix Théroigne de Méricourt De La Femme wallonne 2009"
