= Perron of Liège =

Civic monument in Liège, Belgium

Coordinates: 50°38′44″N 5°34′32″E

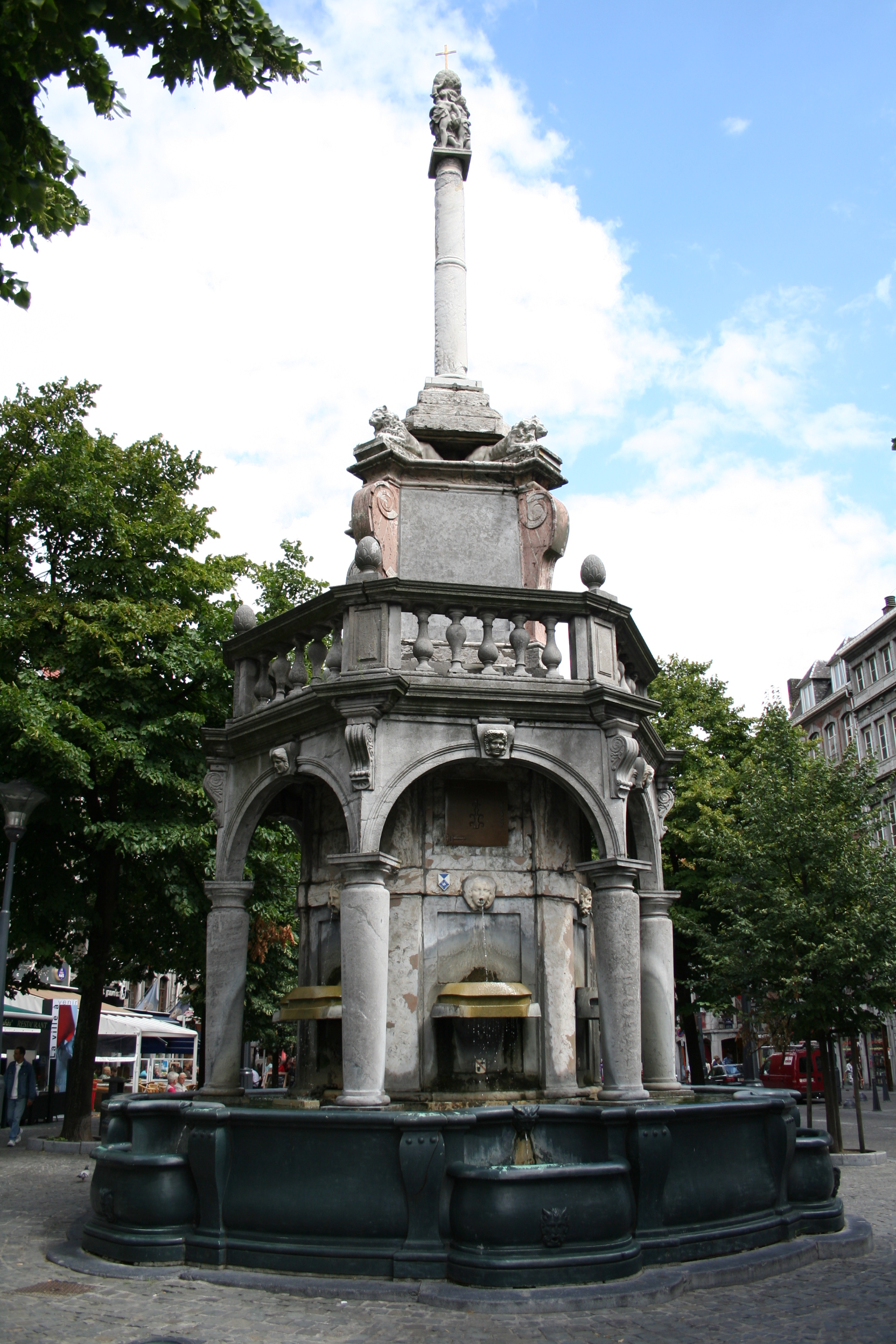
The Perron of Liège, before 2018–2019 renovation

The Perron of Liège (French: Perron de Liège) is a perron, a civic monument, in the centre of the Belgian city Liège. Its precise age is unknown, but it is mentioned in written sources as early as the 12th century. During the Middle Ages it gradually became associated with a sense of civic freedom and independence. After an uprising against the Burgundian State in 1468, Charles the Bold had the perron dismantled and removed to Bruges. After his death it was returned to Liège. Subsequently it has been embellished throughout the centuries. A renovation was carried out in 2018–2019. The city of Liège describes the monument as the most important symbol of the city.

== History ==
The exact age of the Perron de Liège is unknown. The first written mention of the monument is from the 12th century, during the reign of Prince-Bishop Rudolf of Zähringen. Sometime between 1285 and 1308, a fountain was installed just below the pillar. Originally, the perron was a symbol of the ruling prince-bishop and his right to mete out justice. As the city council and communal decision-making gradually grew in importance during the Middle Ages, the perron began to be associated with a sense of civic freedom and independence, a development described already by historian Godefroid Kurth (1847–1916). The column also began to be used as a place from which decisions were communicated to citizens, and a place where criminals were ceremonially displayed and punished, which further strengthened its symbolic association with communal affairs. The perron began to be represented on the coins minted by some prince-bishops, and since the 14th century it has featured on the coat of arms of the city of Liège.

Following the Third Liège War, an uprising against the Burgundian State in 1468 which Liège eventually lost, the conquering Duke of Burgundy Charles the Bold had the perron dismantled and removed to Bruges. The loss of the monument was thus a signal of the city's defeat and loss of civic liberties; several of its independent institutions were at the same time abolished and centralised to be controlled by the Duke. Ten years later, after the death of Charles the Bold, the perron was reinstalled in Liège by Bishop Louis de Bourbon.

Since its return, the column has been restored and embellished on several occasions. A large redecoration scheme carried out in the 16th century gave the monument approximately its current look. The top of the monument was added in 1697 and designed by Jean Del Cour. It is a representation of the three Graces holding a pine cone, another symbol of civic independence. In the 19th century the marble parts of the monument were replaced with less expensive materials. The monument underwent an extensive renovation in 2018–2019, whereby the original sculpture of the Three Graces was replaced by a copy; the original is now displayed in the Curtius Museum.

== Description ==
The Perron of Liège is located on the central Market Square (Place du Marché (Liège)). It today consists of a hexagon-shaped structure surrounded by fountains, surmounted by a gallery resting on columns. Above this, a square structure raises, surmounted by four stone lions that support the original pillar itself.

The monument has been listed as a heritage site since 1934 and since 2009 is classified as an "exceptional monument" (French: monument exceptionnel). The city of Liège describes the monument as the most important symbol of the city.

== Gallery ==
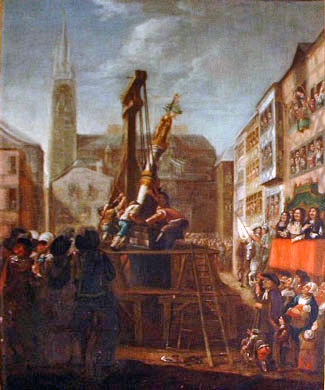
An 18th-century painting showing the reinstalment of the Perron in Liège after its removal by Charles the Bold

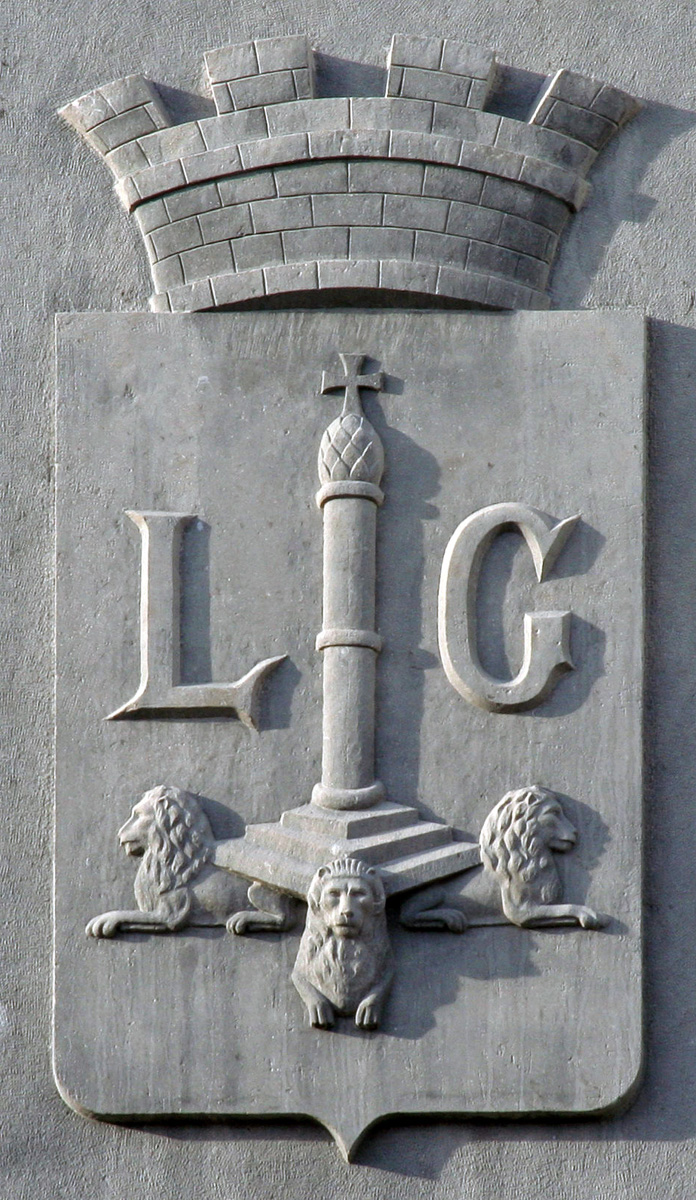
Perron depicted on the coat of arms of Liège

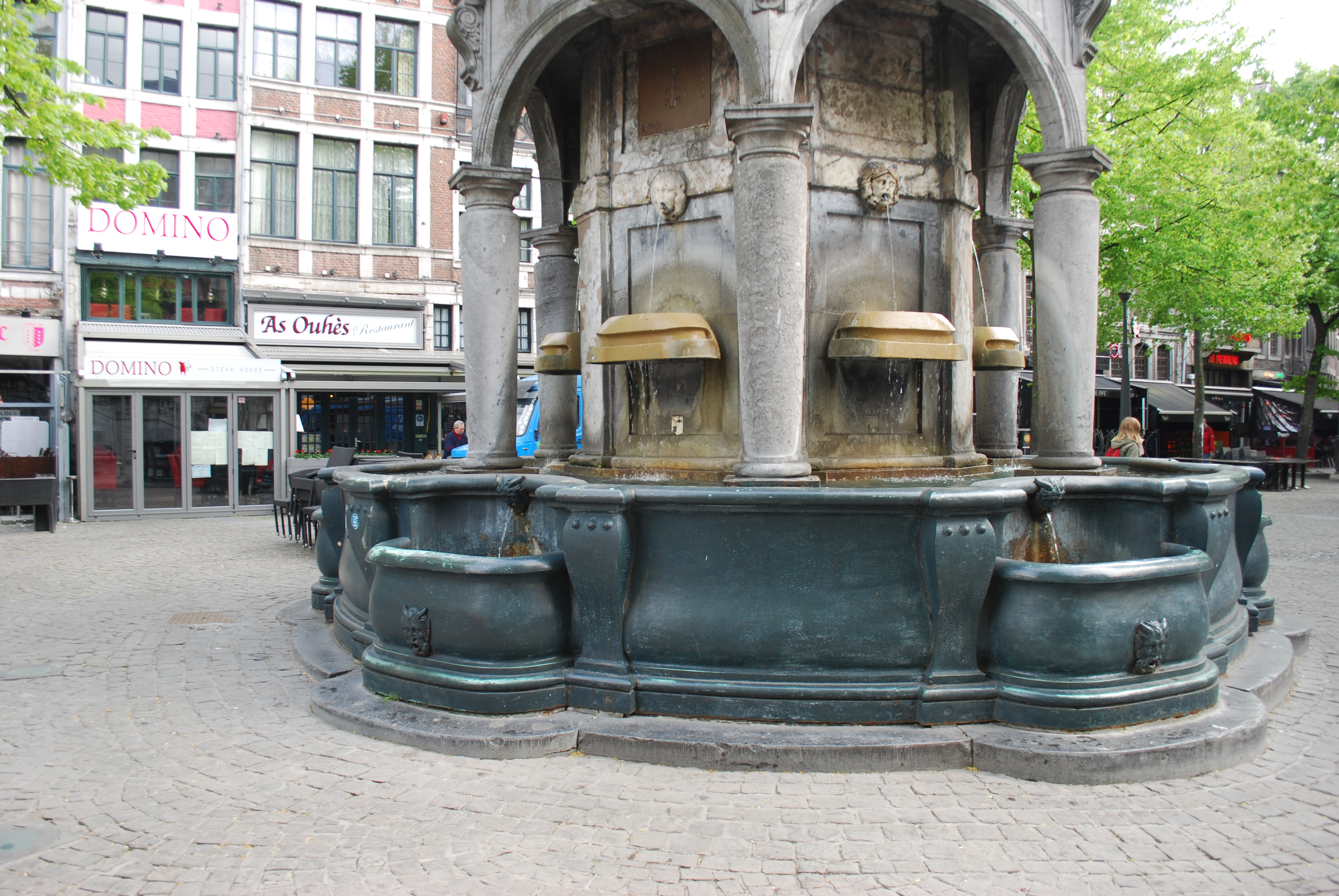
Detail showing the base of the monument (before 2018–2019 renovation)

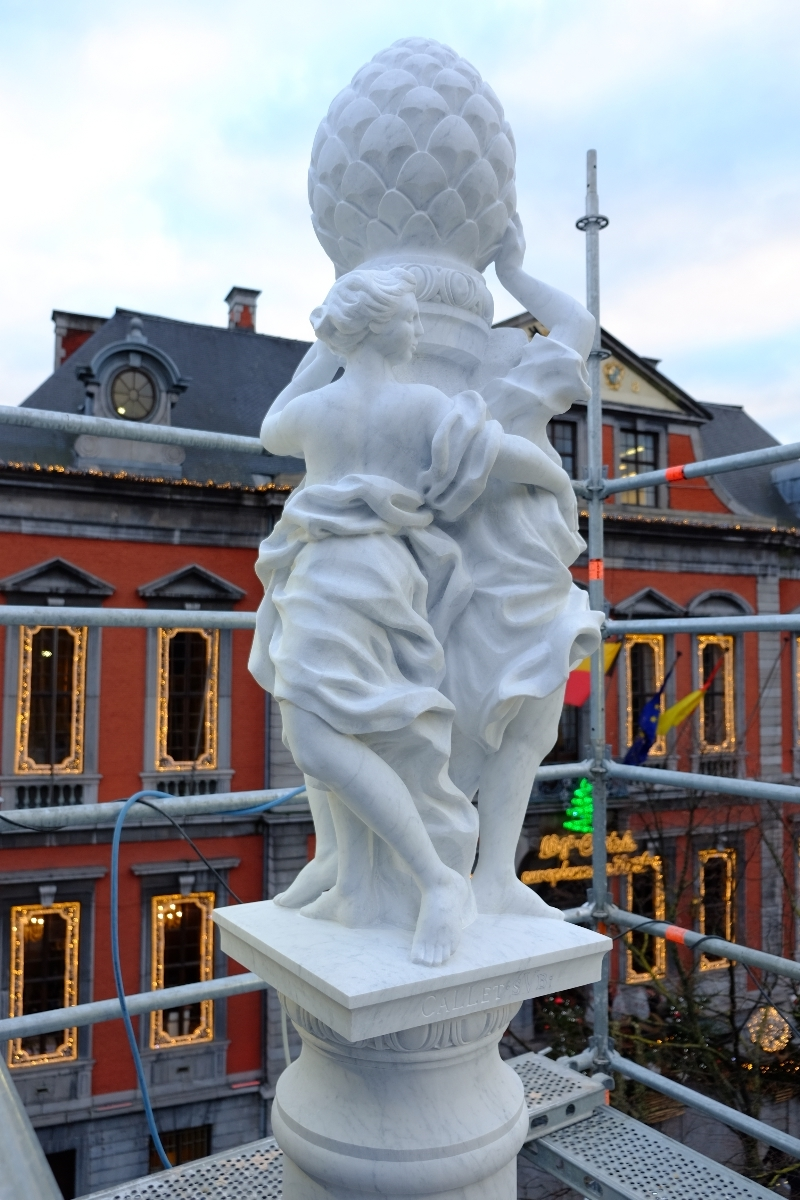
Detail showing the top, a copy of the sculpture by Jean Del Cour of the three Graces holding a pine cone
