= Karima Abd-Daif =

Moroccan Norwegian politician

Karima Abd-Daif (born 23 June 1965) is a Moroccan Norwegian politician for the Labour Party.

Born in Meknès, Morocco, she migrated to Norway and studied economics and French at the Oslo University College and Bergen University College. She has been elected to the Oslo city council several times.

She also served as a deputy representative to the Norwegian Parliament from Oslo during the term 2005–2009.
