= 12/13th Battalion of the Line =

12th Line Regiment (1831–1993) 13th Line Regiment (1874–1947, 1976–1993) 12th "Prince Leopold" – 13th Line Battalion (1993–present)
- Active: 1831–
- Country: Belgium
- Branch: Belgian Army
- Type: Infantry
- Role: motorized infantry
- Size: 650 soldiers
- Part of: Motorized Brigade
- Motto: À l'avant-garde
- Colors: Red and Yellow
- March: Marche du 12e Régiment de Ligne Prince Léopold

Commanders
- Notable commanders: Alphonse Jacques de Dixmude

The 12th of the Line (Prince Leopold) – 13th of the Line Battalion (French: Bataillon 12e de Ligne Prince Léopold - 13e de Ligne, Dutch: Bataljon 12 Linie Prins Léopold - 13 Linie) is an infantry unit in the Belgian Army of the Belgian Armed Forces. It maintains the traditions of the 12th Regiment of the Line and 13th Regiment of the Line. From 2011 until 1 January 2017 the regiment was a part of the Light Brigade and on that date the regiment joined the Motorized Brigade.

== History ==
=== 12th Regiment of the Line ===
The 12th Regiment of the Line is the oldest active Belgian infantry regiment. It was created on 31 March 1831, and since 1984 has been authorised to bear the title "Prince Leopold" which was originally bestowed on it in 1915, during the First World War.

The badge of the 12th Regiment of the Line was based on the coat of arms of the city of Liège where the regiment had its barracks. It depicted the Perron of Liège, an important civic monument in Liège.

=== 13th Regiment of the Line ===
The 13th of the Line was founded in 1874. It was disbanded in 1947, but in 1976 it reformed as an anti-tank regiment.

=== Amalgamation ===
In 1993, the 12th of the Line and the 13th of the Line were merged to form the 12th Battalion of the Line "Prince Leopold" – 13th of the Line.

== Standard ==
Coat of arms of Liège, on which the 12th Regiment of the Line's badge was based

The standards of the unit carry the following citations:
For the 12th Regiment of Line:

- Liège
- Anvers
- Dixmude
- Yser
- Merckem
- La Lys
- Campaign of 1914-1918
- La Lys 1940

For the 13th Regiment of Line:

- Namur [1914]
- Termonde
- Yser
- Merckem
- Zarren
- Handzaeme
- La Lys 1940

As well as a fourragère of the Order of Leopold.

== Organisation ==
The 12/13th Battalion of the Line comprises:

- HQ staff
- 1st company (instruction)
- 2nd company
- 3rd company
- 4th company (operational reserve company)
- service company

== Lineage ==
Lineage
12th Regiment of the Line "Prince Leopold"	12th-13th Battalion of the Line
13th Regiment of the Line	12th-13th Battalion of the Line

== Sources ==
- "Regiment 12th of the Line Prince Leopold - 13th of the Line" (in Dutch). Defence Belgium.
- "Regiment 12th of the Line Prince Leopold - 13th of the Line" (in French). Defence Belgium.
