= Karima scarciesii =

Conservation status
- Near Threatened (IUCN 3.1)

Scientific classification
- Kingdom: Plantae
- Clade: Tracheophytes
- Clade: Angiosperms
- Clade: Eudicots
- Clade: Rosids
- Order: Malpighiales
- Family: Euphorbiaceae
- Subfamily: Crotonoideae
- Tribe: Aleuritideae
- Genus: Karima; Cheek & Riina
- Species: K. scarciesii

Binomial name
- Karima scarciesii (Scott Elliot) Cheek

Synonyms
- Croton scarciesii Scott Elliot

Species of flowering plant

Karima scarciesii is a species of flowering plant in the family Euphorbiaceae, and the sole species in genus Karima. It is a shrub native to Burkina Faso, Ghana, Guinea, Guinea-Bissau, Côte d'Ivoire, Liberia, Senegal, and Sierra Leone in tropical west Africa.

It grows along lowland rivers, mainly in evergreen tropical rain forests and less commonly in gallery forest in the inland forest–savanna transition. It grows along river banks which are submerged in the wet season and exposed in the dry season, usually on rocky banks and less often on sand or silt, in sun or in the shade of riverbank trees. It has a patchy distribution and can be locally common. It typically grows with other rheophytes, including species of Podostemaceae and Rotula aquatica (Boraginaceae).

The species was first described as Croton scarciesii by George Francis Scott Elliot in 1894. In 2016 Martin Cheek et al. placed the species in the newly-described genus Karima as K. scarciesii.
