= Verviers =

Municipality in Liège Province, Wallonia, Belgium

Verviers: Vervî (Walloon)
- Municipality
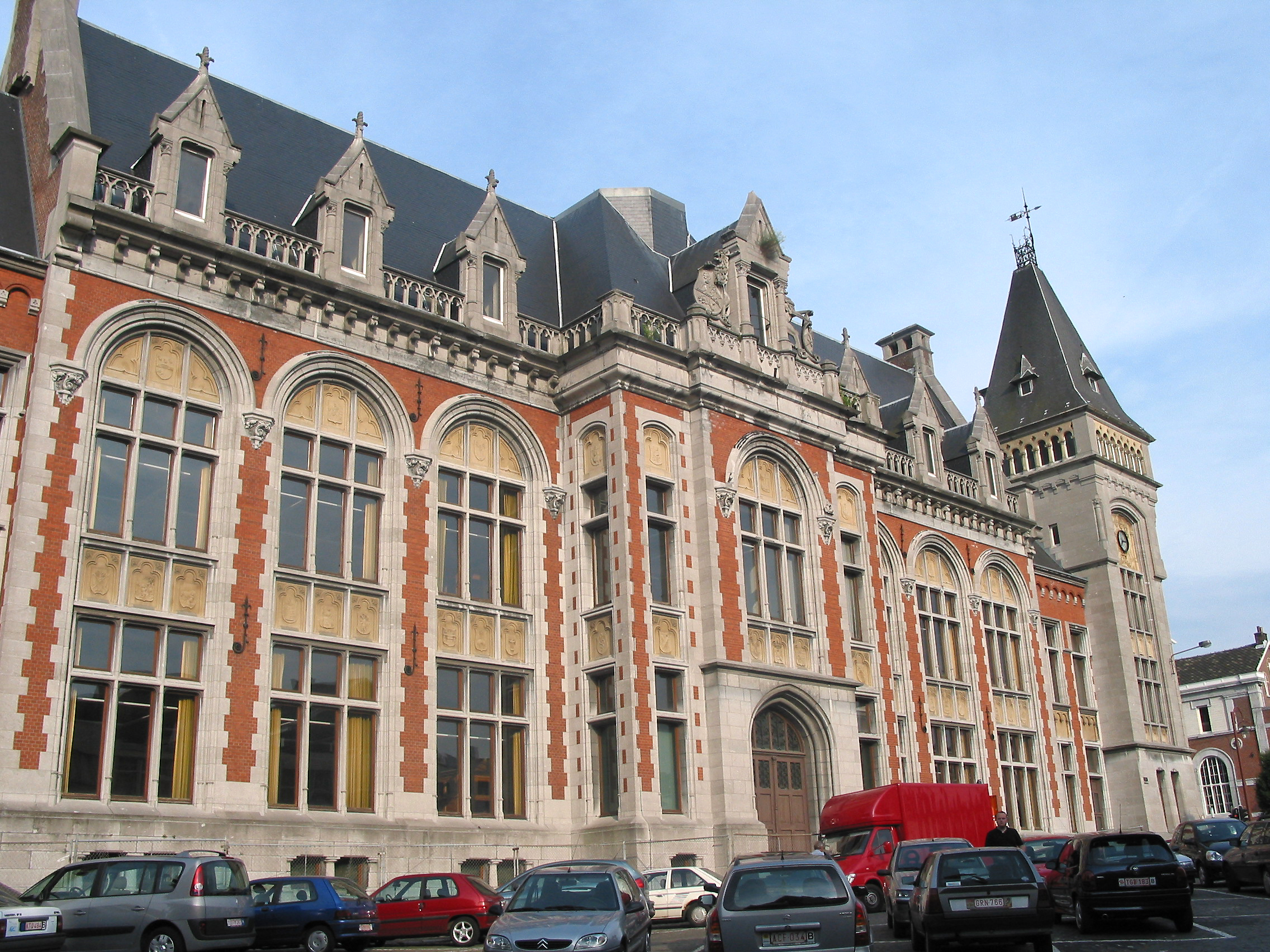
- Palais de Justice (courthouse)

- Flag Coat of arms

- Location of Verviers in the province of Liège
- Interactive map of Verviers
- Location in Belgium
- Coordinates: 50°35′N 05°51′E
- Country: Belgium
- Community: French Community
- Region: Wallonia
- Province: Liège
- Arrondissement: Verviers

Government
  - Mayor: Muriel Targnion (PS)
  - Governing party: PS-MR-Nouveau Verviers

Area
  - Total: 33.01 km^{2} (12.75 sq mi)

Population (2018-01-01)
  - Total: 55,198
  - Density: 1,672/km^{2} (4,331/sq mi)
- Postal codes: 4800, 4801, 4802
- NIS code: 63079
- Area codes: 087
- Website: www.verviers.be

Verviers (French pronunciation: [vɛʁvje]; Walloon: Vervî) is a city and municipality of Wallonia located in the province of Liège, Belgium.

The municipality consists of the following districts: Ensival, Heusy, Lambermont, Petit-Rechain, Stembert, and Verviers. It is also the center of an agglomeration that includes Dison and Pepinster, making it the second biggest in the province and an important regional center, located roughly halfway between Liège and the German border.

Water has played an important role in the town's economy, notably in the development first of its textile and later its tourist industries. As a result, many fountains have been built in Verviers, leading it to be named Wallonia's "Water Capital". The seats of the two Walloon public institutions for water distribution and water treatment are located in the town.

== History ==
=== Early history ===
Various flint and bone fragments, as well as Roman coins, were found in this area, attesting to the early settlements in the region. In the 4th century, the Romans had to deal with a constant push of Germanic tribes coming from the east. Successful at first at containing them, they finally had to concede defeat, allowing Clovis's Salian Franks to occupy the region at the end of the 5th century. The Verviers area was covered with forests and became a hunting ground for the Merovingian kings, who maintained a vicus in neighbouring Theux. It was also slowly Christianized by the monks of the nearby Abbey of Stavelot.

Late in the 10th century, Charles the Simple ceded the Marquisate of Franchimont to Notker of Liège, one of Notker's final steps in consolidating the Prince-Bishopric of Liège. Liège took direct control of the marquisate in 1014, an act which was confirmed by emperor Frederick Barbarossa and by Pope Adrian IV in 1155.

=== 15th century to the present ===
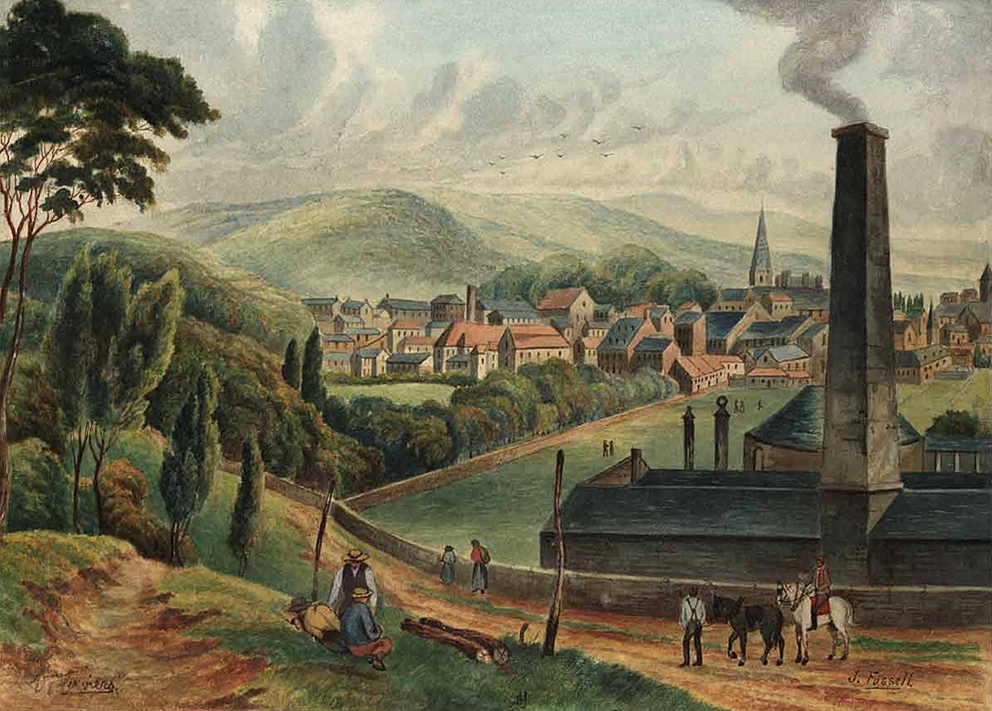
View of Verviers in the mid-19th century. Watercolor by Joseph Fussell.

The first mention of a textile industry in this area dates from the 15th century. One century later, the cloth industry took the place of the older metallurgical works, thanks in part to the Eighty Years War raging in the neighbouring Netherlands. The size of the town, however, remained relatively modest. It was only in 1651 that the expansion of the fulleries led to Verviers being recognized as one of the prince-bishopric's bonnes villes (main cities).

The end of the 18th century was troubled by the French Revolution. The annexation of Liège to France in 1795 caused a steep economic decline and unprecedented poverty. The city's fortunes rose again after the Battle of Waterloo (1815). Verviers was at the eastern end of the sillon industriel, the industrial backbone of Wallonia. Although the Napoleonic wars brought economic uncertainty, the textile industry continued to grow throughout this period. Industrialist William Cockerill brought his knowledge of the machines already in British industry and introduced mechanization to the factories of Iwan Simonis starting a new era in the Verviers textile industry. Thereafter, roads were paved, gas lighting was installed, and the city doubled in size thanks to the Industrial Revolution. After World War I, Verviers could share with Bradford the title of "Wool Capital of the World".

Film of US First Army headquarters with George Patton on 3 November 1944 in Verviers

== 2021 floods ==
On the night of 14–15 July, the Vesdre burst its banks and caused massive water damage. There was an exceptionally heavy rainfall that night and the dam of the reservoir at Eupen was opened. The human and material damage was incalculable. People spoke of greater damage than during World War II.

== Economy ==
Verviers was home to a thriving wool and textile industry that was renowned for its quality and contributed greatly to the growth of the town. However, as of the 1950s, the local factories could not face international competition and started closing one after the other which prompted the economic decline of the town. The economy has been slowly recovering since the mid-1990s but remains fragile. Several commercial complexes have opened in recent years in an attempt to revitalize the most affected areas.

== Transport ==
The nearest airports are Liège Airport which is located 29.3 km away and Brussels Airport located 118.4 km away from Vervies.

== Sights ==
- Verviers counts several museums, including the Wool and Fashion Tourist Centre, housed in a former factory with a Neoclassical-style façade.
- The Grand Theatre, also known as La Bonbonnière, was built in the same style at the end of the 19th century, while the Grand Poste was built in the Neogothic style.
- The city has a number of interesting fountains and thematic strolling paths.

== Notable people ==
- Jean-Jacques Andrien, film maker (1944)
- Bertrand Baguette, racing driver (born 1986)
- Christian Beck, writer and poet (1879–1916)
- André Blavier, poet and critic (1922–2001)
- William Cockerill, industrialist, settled in Verviers in 1799
- Mathieu Crickboom, violinist (1871–1947)
- Pierre David, twice mayor of Verviers (1771-1839)
- Pierre De Meyts (1944-2025), physician and biochemist
- Brandon Deville, football player (born 1993)
- Jacques Drèze, economist (1929-2022)
- Marc Duez, racing driver (born 1957)
- Albert Dupuis, composer (1877–1967)
- Emile Fabry (1865–1966), artist and painter.
- Philippe Gilbert, road racing cyclist (born 1982)
- Green Montana, rapper (born 1993)
- René Hausman, comic strip scenarist (1936-2016)
- Jean Haust, linguist and philologist (1868–1946)
- Max Houben, athlete (1898–1949)
- Steve Houben, jazz saxophonist and flutist (1950-2026)
- Karima, writer (born 1976)
- Jean-Marie Klinkenberg, linguist (born 1944)
- Marc Lacroix, breast cancer researcher (born 1963)
- Guillaume Lekeu, composer (1870–1894)
- Roger Leloup, comic strip scenarist (born 1933)
- Raymond Macherot, cartoonist (1924–2008)
- Maurane, singer (1960–2018)
- Philippe Maystadt, politician (1948-2017)
- Dominique Monami, tennis player (born 1973)
- David Murgia, actor (born 1988)
- Nornagest, musician and writer (born 1977)
- Henri Pirenne, historian (1862–1935)
- Maurice Henri Léonard Pirenne, vision scientist (1912-1978)
- Pierre Rapsat, singer (1948–2002)
- Eliane Reyes, pianist (born 1977)
- Georges Ruggiu, radio presenter during the 1994 Rwandan genocide (born 1957)
- Albert Sambi Lokonga, footballer (born 1999)
- Lucy Sante, writer and critic (born 1954)
- Céline Scheen, classical soprano (born 1976)
- Jacques Stotzem, fingerstyle guitarist (born 1959)
- Jean Vallée, singer (1941–2013)
- Eric van de Poele, Formula One driver (born 1961)
- Henri Vieuxtemps, composer and virtuoso violinist (1820–1881)
- Violetta Villas, singer (1938–2011)
- Charles Weerts, racing driver (born 2001)
- Yvan Ylieff, politician (born 1941)

== Education ==
=== Tertiary education ===
Tertiary educational institutions include:

- Haute Ecole de la Province de Liège (Construction)
- Haute Ecole de la Province de Liège - Bachelier en soins infirmiers
- Haute Ecole Charlemagne Verviers
- HELMO Verviers

=== Primary and secondary schools ===
Secondary schools include:

- Athénée royal Thil Lorrain Verviers 1
- Athénée royal Verdi
- Centre scolaire Saint-François-Xavier
- Ecole Polytechnique - Enseignement de la Province de Liège
- Institut Notre Dame
- Institut Provincial d'Enseignement Secondaire (IPES)
- Institut Provincial d'Enseignement Secondaire Paramédical de Liège - Huy - Verviers
- Institut Sainte-Claire
- Institut Saint-François-Xavier 2
- Institut Saint-Michel
- Institut Technique Don Bosco

== Demographics ==
Verviers has a significant Muslim population, with the proportion estimated to be approximately 25% as of 2020. Much of Verviers' Muslim community is impoverished, and suffers from resentment, causing those disillusioned to become attracted to Islamic extremism as seen notably during the 2015 Verviers police raid on Islamists.

The migrant communities also suffer from significant unemployment, and are of mainly Turkish and Moroccan origin. Verviers also has Kurdish, Congolese, Chechen, Somali and Sub-Saharan African communities. Like its sister city of Roubaix in France, and Bradford in Britain, with similarly high Muslim populations, migrants from Africa and Asia moved in the 1960s to Verviers to work in industrial mills, and has suffered from subsequent poverty after its manufacturing was outsourced overseas. Many migrants live in the Hodimont section of the town, where there are several Turkish restaurants, African shops, halal butcheries, and mosques.

Group of origin	Year		Year		Year		Year	
Group of origin	2000		2010		2020		2026	
Group of origin	Number	%	Number	%	Number	%	Number	%
Belgians with Belgian background	38,274	63,2	35,532	64,3	31,207	56,4	29,155	51,9
Belgians with foreign background	11,838	19,5	13,912	25,2	17,404	31,5	19,391	34,5
Neighbouring country	1,243	2,05	1,435	2,59	1,461	2,64	1,430	2,54
EU27 (excluding neighbouring country)	8,063	13,31	3,075	5,56	3,512	6,35	3,641	6,48
Outside EU 27	2,532	4,18	9,402	17,01	12,431	22,48	14,320	25,48
Non-Belgians	10,445	17.3	5,809	10,5	6,679	12,1	7,636	13,6
Neighbouring country	605	1,00	646	1,17	563	1,01	596	1,06
EU27 (excluding neighbouring country)	8,494	14,02	1,735	3,14	1,176	2,12	1,652	2,94
Outside EU 27	1,346	2,22	3,428	6,20	4,340	7,84	5,388	9,59
Total Population	60,557	100	55,253	100	55,290	100	56,182	100

== Twin cities ==
- France: Arles
- Germany: Mönchengladbach
- France: Roubaix
- United Kingdom: Bradford
- France: La Motte-Chalancon

== Gallery ==
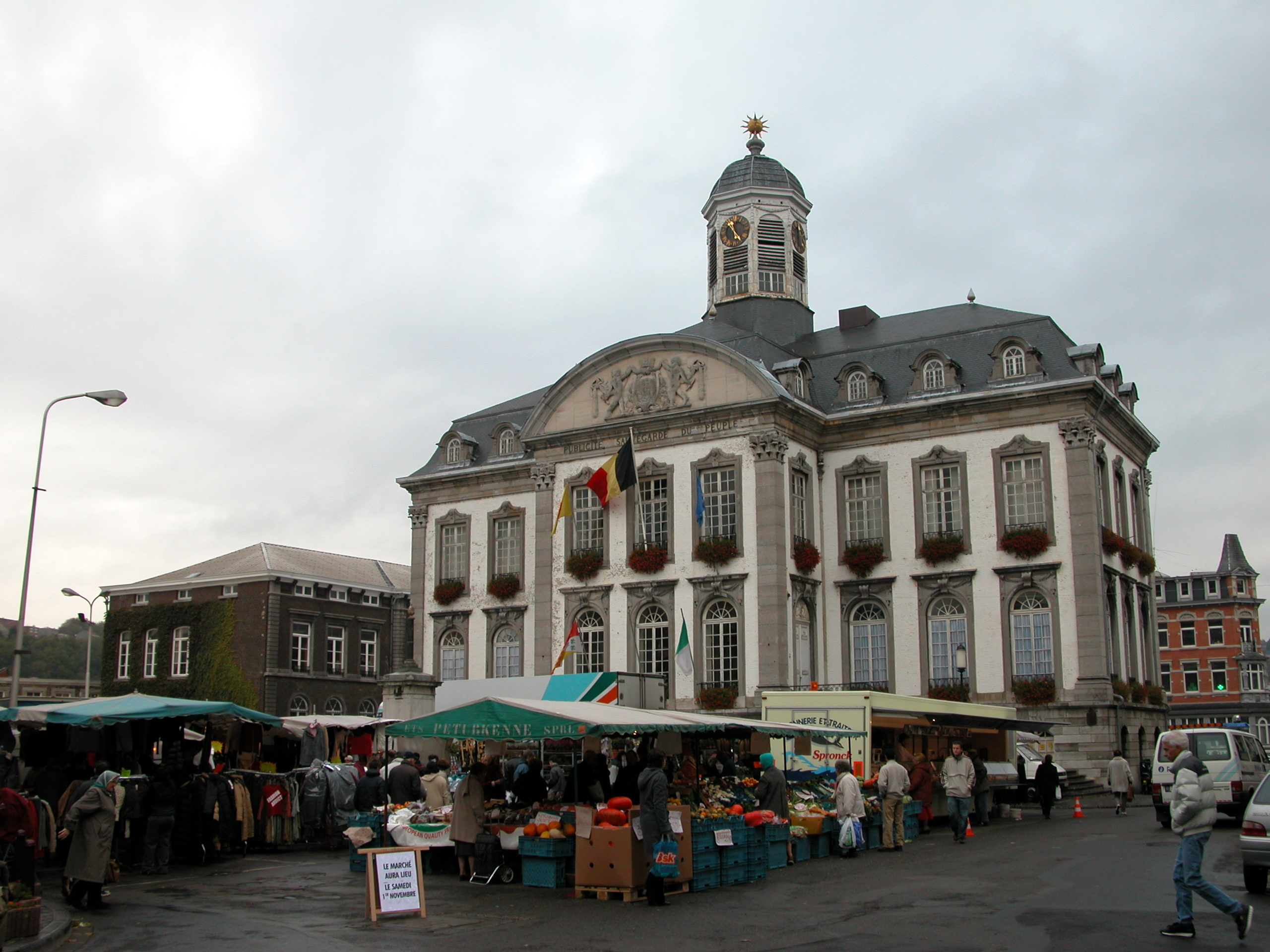
City Hall

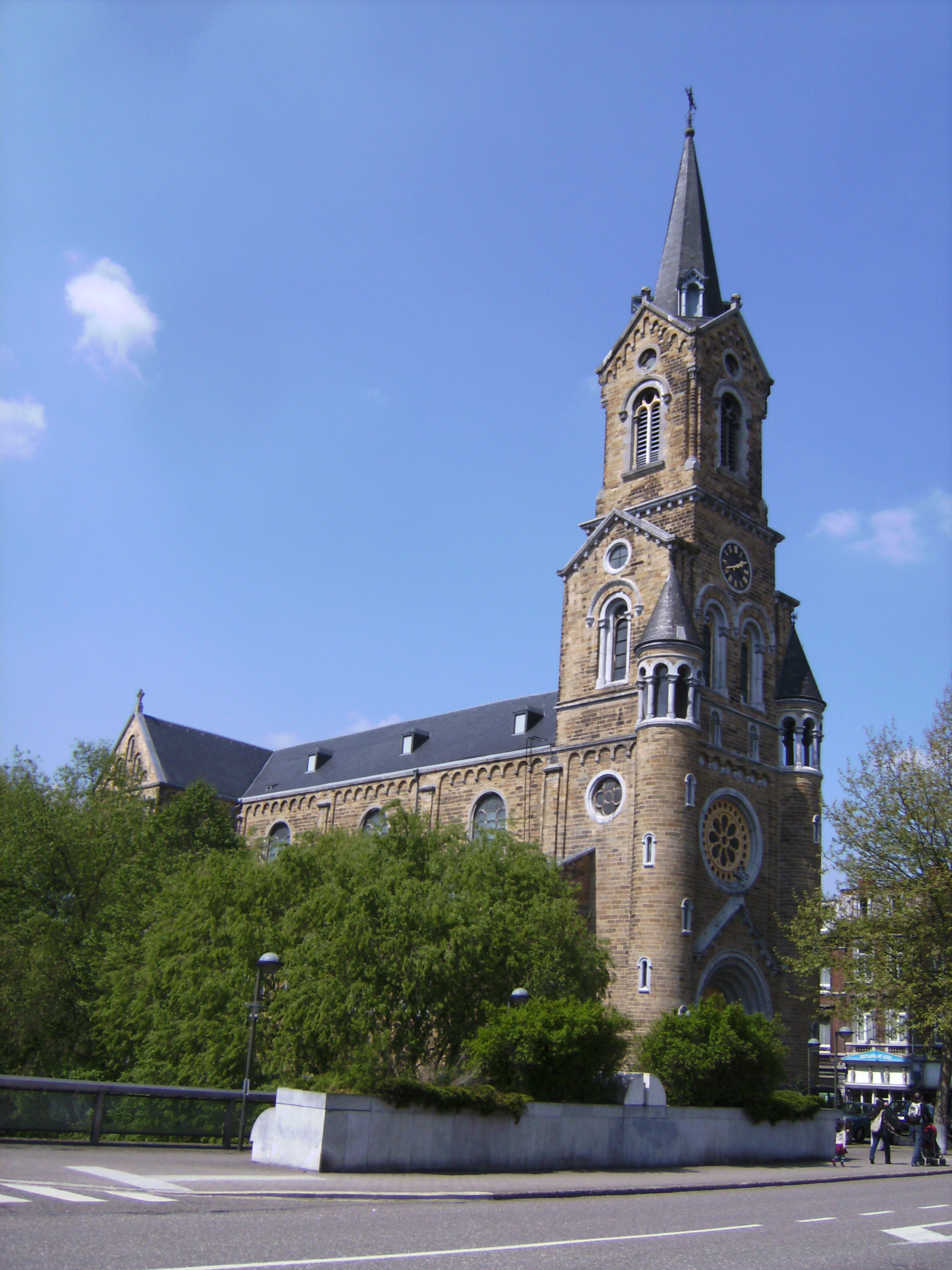
Church

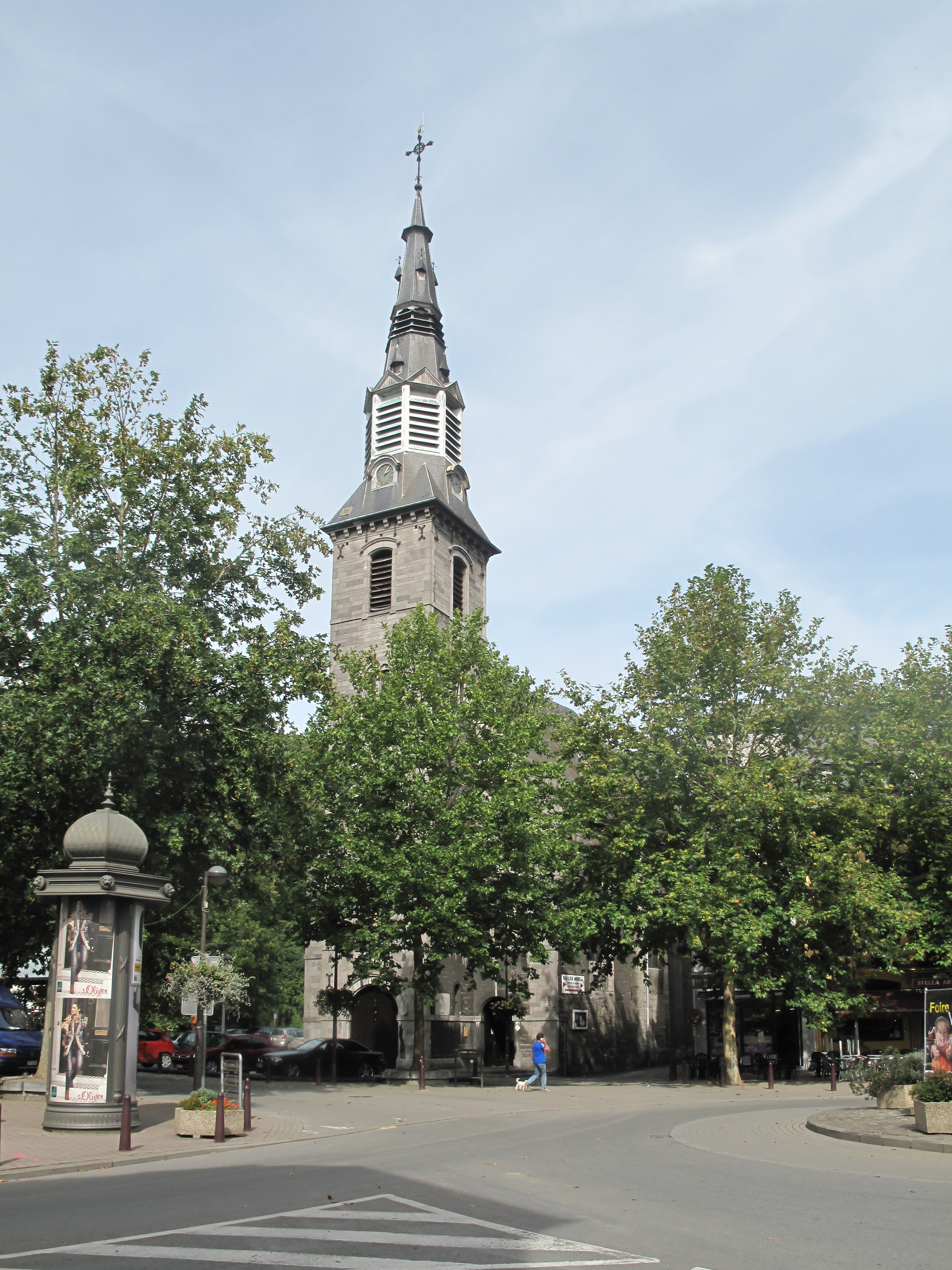
Church: Notre Dame des Récollets

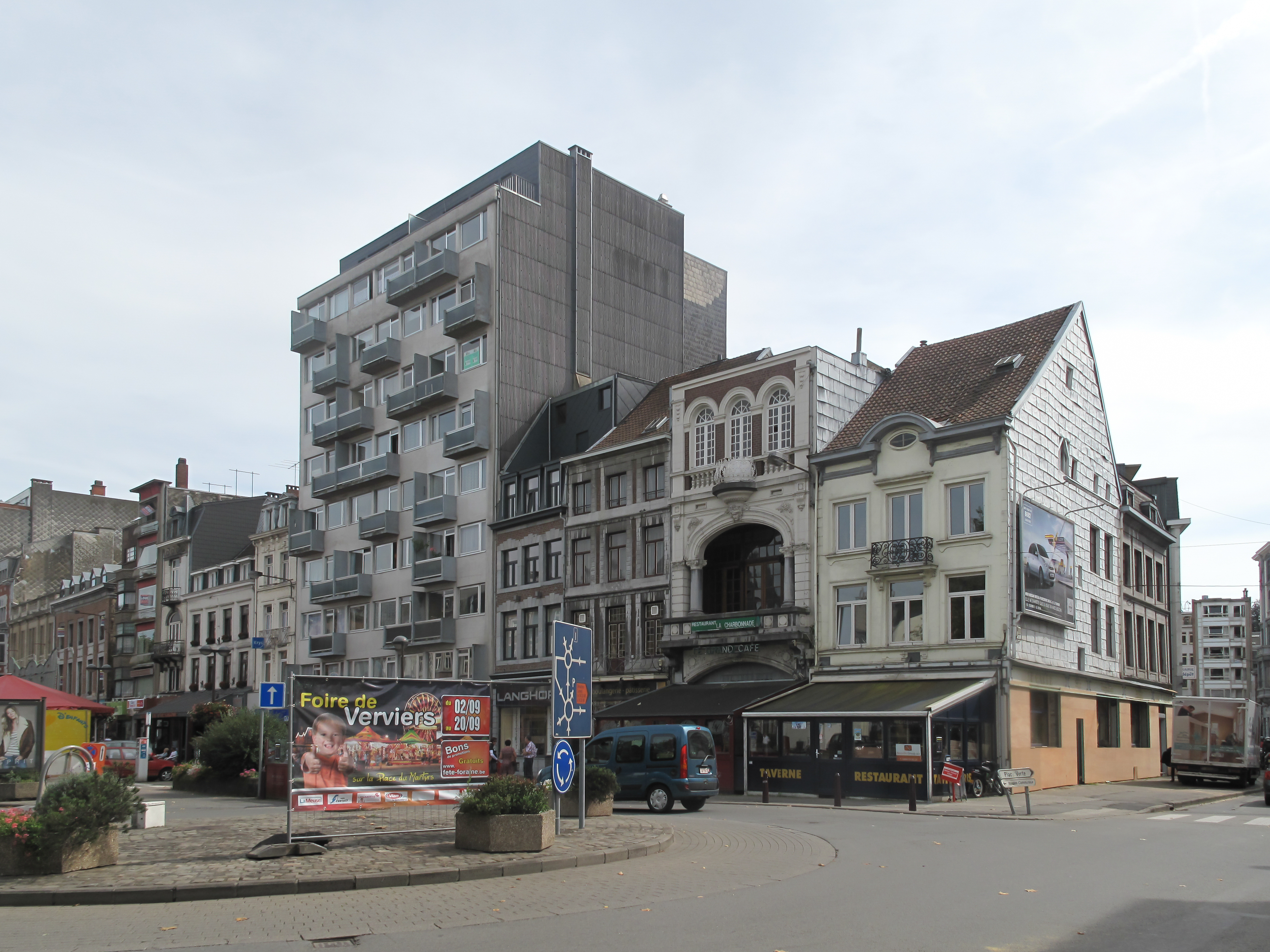
Roundabout with monumental houses

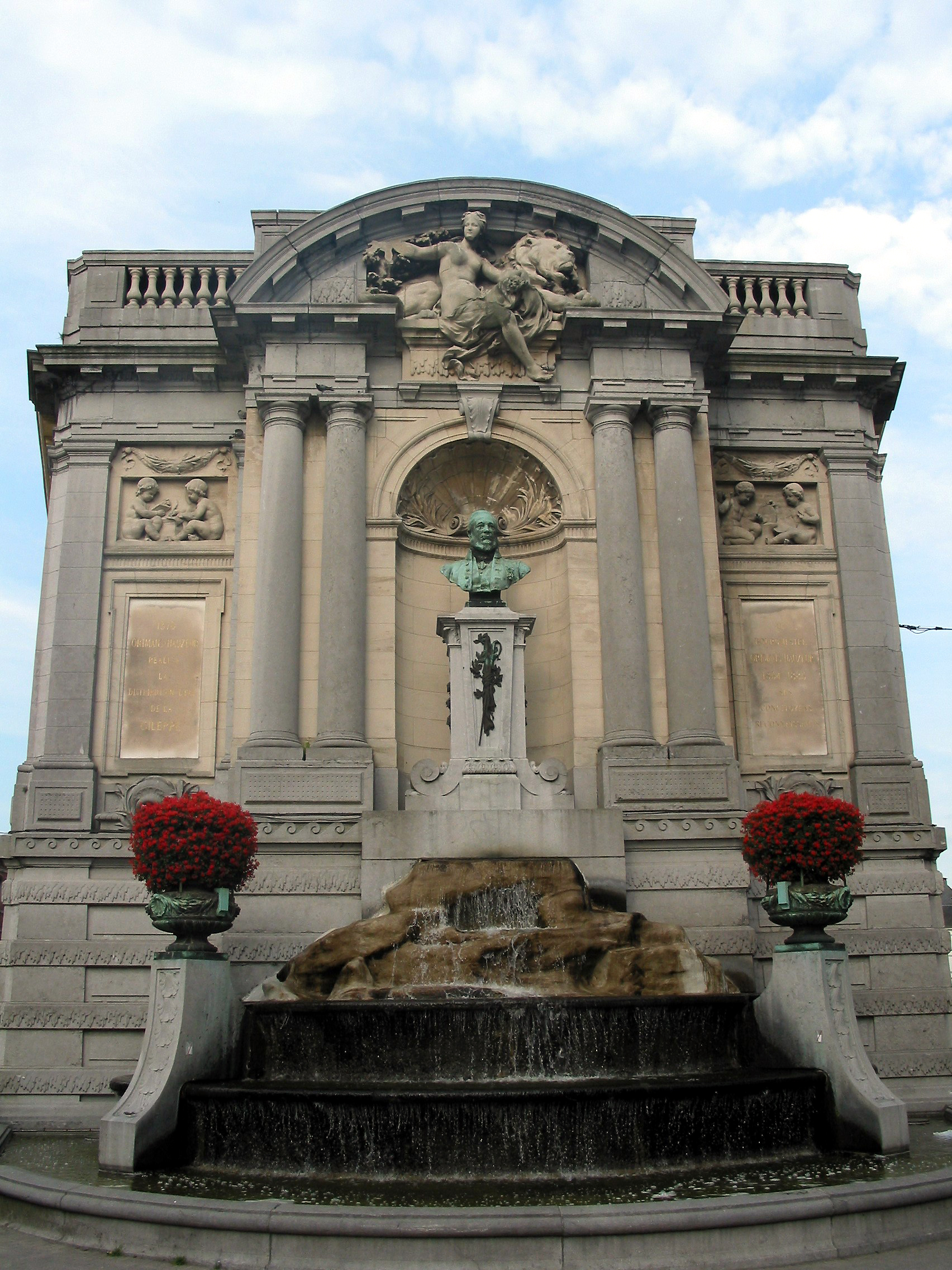
The Ortmans fountain

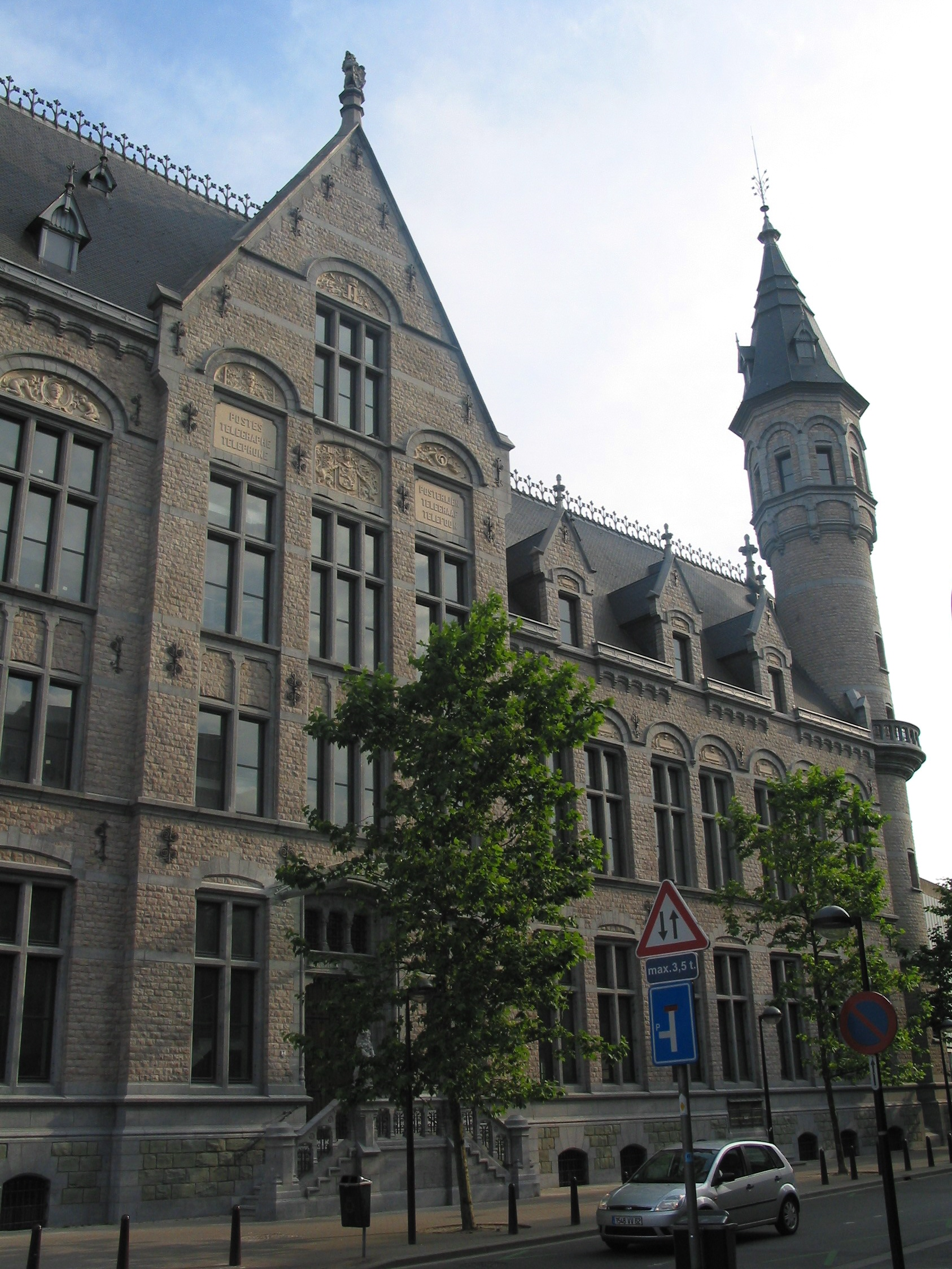
The Grand Poste

== See also ==
- List of protected heritage sites in Verviers
- 2015 anti-terrorism operations in Belgium
