= Franchimont Castle =

Medieval castle in Theux, Belgium

Coordinates: 50.5277°N 5.8239°E

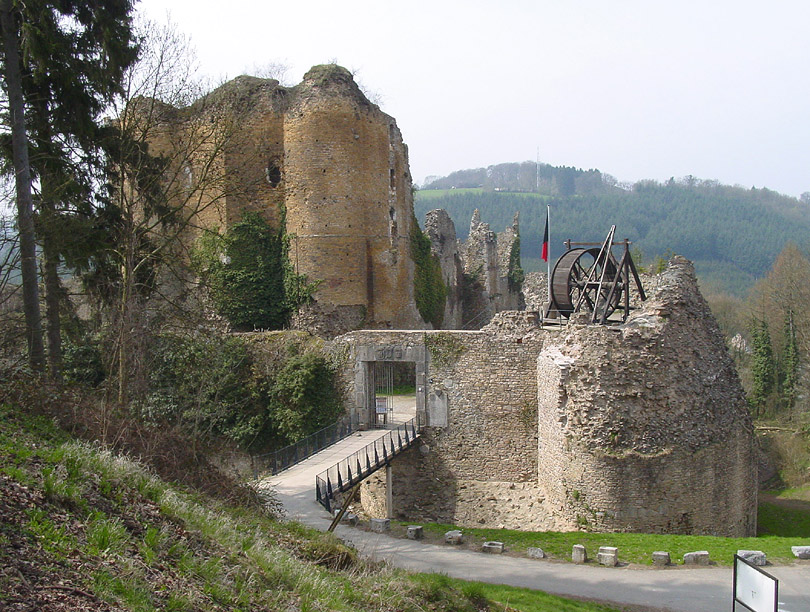
Franchimont Castle

Franchimont Castle (French: Château de Franchimont) is a medieval castle in the municipality of Theux, Liège Province, Wallonia, Belgium. It sits at the western end of a small hill 2 kilometres (1.2 mi) south of the village of Theux, a sub-municipality.

== History ==
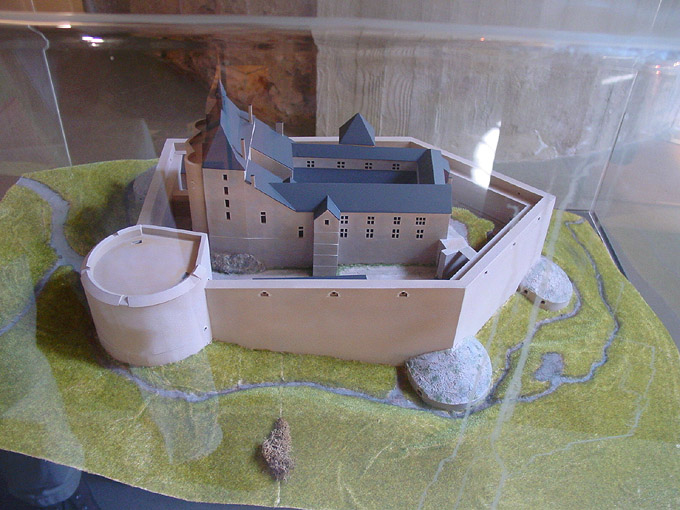
Model of Franchimont Castle showing outer wall added in early 16th century

It is thought to have originally been built in the 11th century, as a stronghold of the Prince-Bishopric of Liège. The original building was extended several times during the Middle Ages, once after a fire in 1387.

In 1487 the castle was besieged, and around the same period the La Marck family took ownership of it. In the early 16th century the outer wall was built, with casemates and an artillery tower added.

The prince-bishops of Liège took the title of Marquis of Franchimont at the start of the 16th century, with Franchimont Castle serving as the base of the Marquessate of Franchimont. The Marquessate was a small province of the Prince-Bishopric, six leagues long by four leagues wide, (Note: League is a measurement that has varied by locality and time period, such as ranging from 3.268 km to 5.849 km in different places in nearby France, prior to the start of the French Revolution in 1789. Using this as only a rough estimate, the Marquessate of Franchimont could range between 256 square kilometres (99 sq mi) and 821 square kilometres (317 sq mi), larger than the modern Brussels-Capital Region but smaller than the area on the eastern edge of modern Liège Province locally governed by the German-speaking Community of Belgium.) bounded in by the Duchy of Limburg (to the east), the Duchy of Luxemburg (fragmented, to the south and the west) and the Princely Abbey of Stavelot-Malmedy (fragmented, to the south and the northwest).

== Modern ==
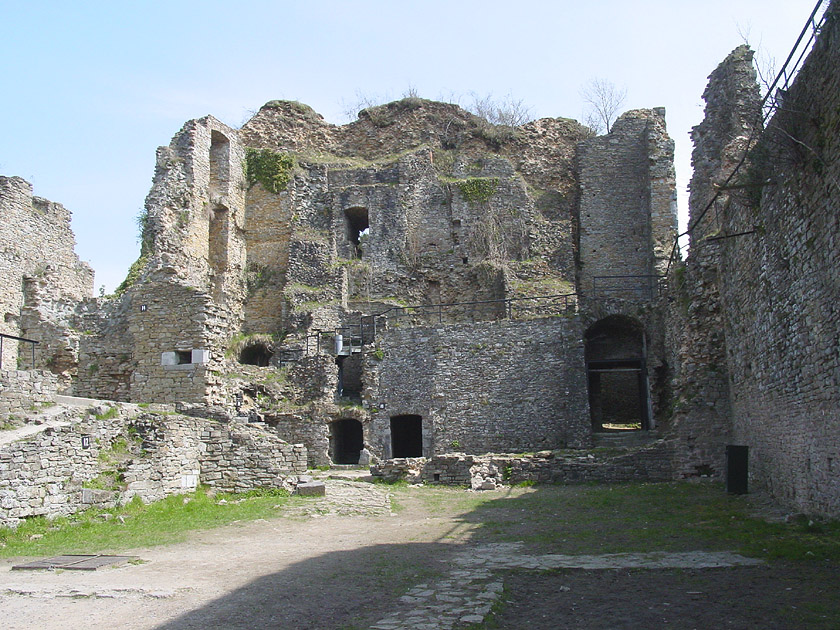
The remains of the keep, from the inside

Today the castle is owned by the town of Theux and is open to the public. The artillery tower at the north-east corner contains a small exhibition and the ticket office.

== See also ==
- List of castles in Belgium
