= Theux =

Municipality in Liège Province, Wallonia, Belgium

Theux Teu (Walloon)
- Municipality
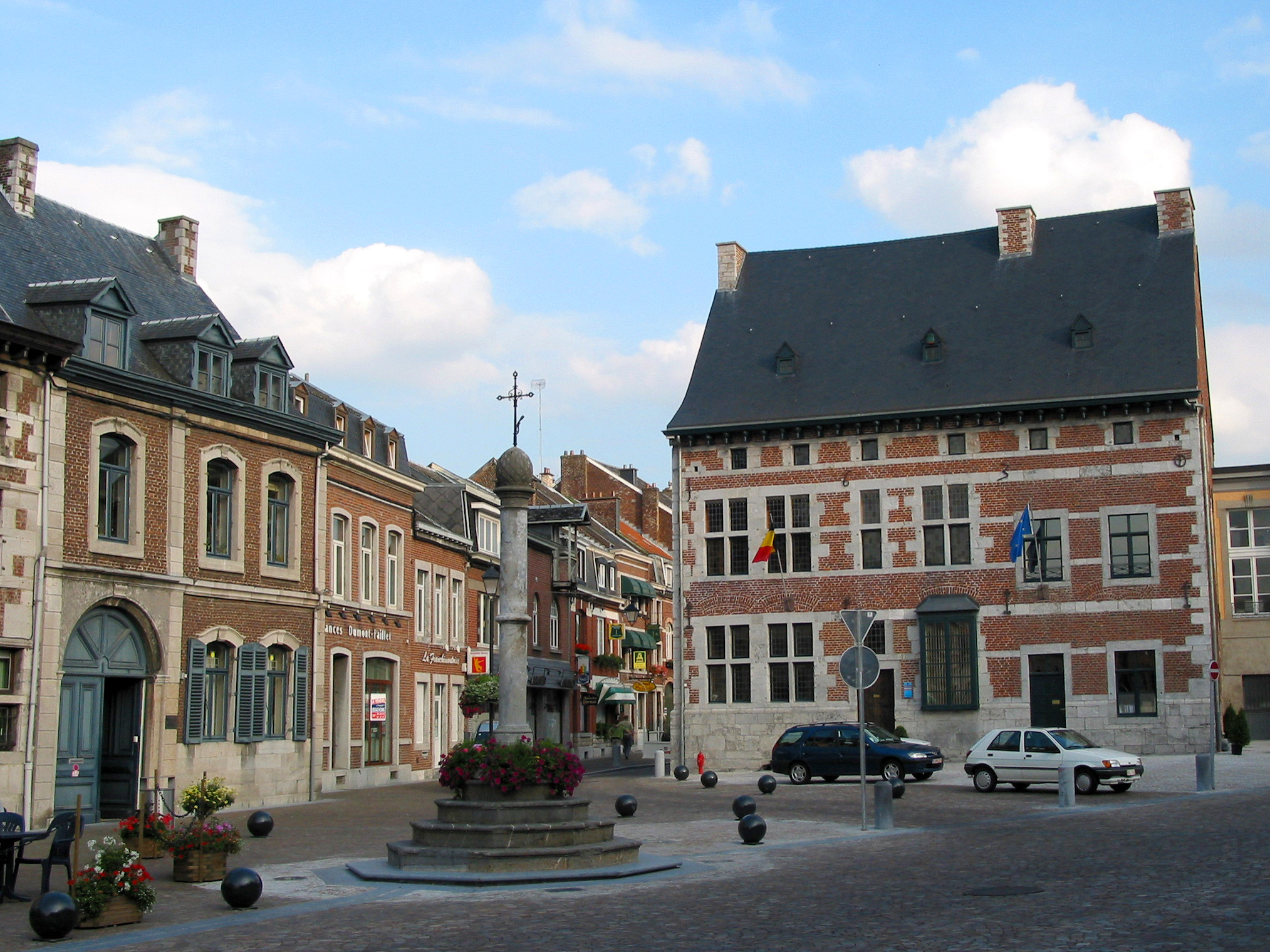
- Place du Perron

- Flag Coat of arms

- Location of Theux in the province of Liège
- Interactive map of Theux
- Location in Belgium
- Coordinates: 50°32′N 05°49′E
- Country: Belgium
- Community: French Community
- Region: Wallonia
- Province: Liège
- Arrondissement: Verviers

Government
  - Mayor: Pierre Lemarchand
  - Governing party: Intérêts franchimontois réunis (IFR)

Area
  - Total: 83.48 km^{2} (32.23 sq mi)

Population (2018-01-01)
  - Total: 12,025
  - Density: 144.0/km^{2} (373.1/sq mi)
- Postal codes: 4910
- NIS code: 63076
- Area codes: 087
- Website: www.theux.be

Theux (French pronunciation: [tø]; Walloon: Teu) is a municipality of Wallonia located in the province of Liège, Belgium.

On 1 January 2006 the municipality had 11,571 inhabitants. The total area is 83.36 km^{2}, giving a population density of 139 inhabitants per km^{2}.

The municipality consists of the following districts: La Reid, Polleur, and Theux (including the hamlet of Tancrémont).

== History ==
In World War II, the 75th Division of the U.S. Army, 575th Signal Co., maintained its command post in the town from January 10–12, 1945, as it counterattacked against the German army in the Battle of the Bulge.

== Notable buildings ==
- Franchimont Castle is located in Theux municipality.
- A Perron, symbol of the town's status.
- Shrine of Tancrémont, in the hamlet of Tancrémont.
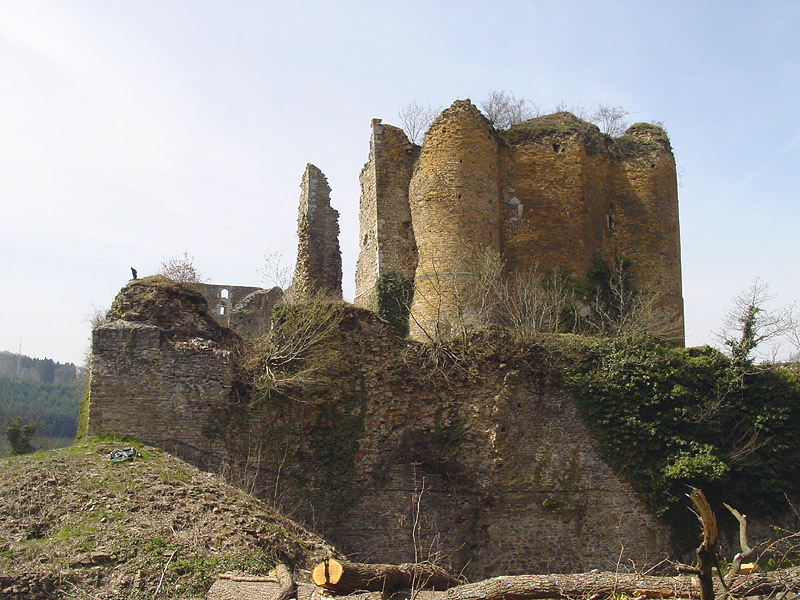
Franchimont Castle

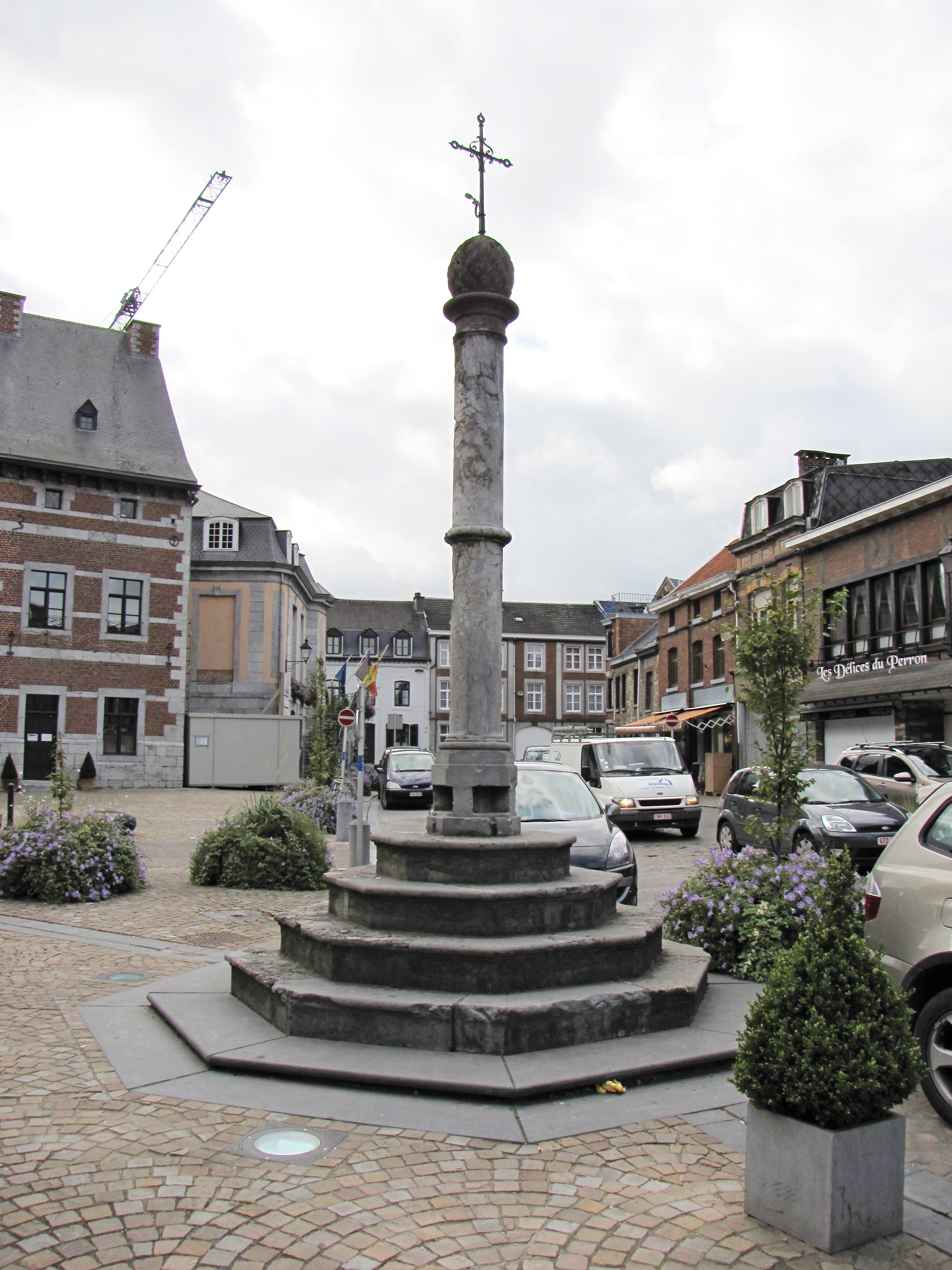
Theux Perron

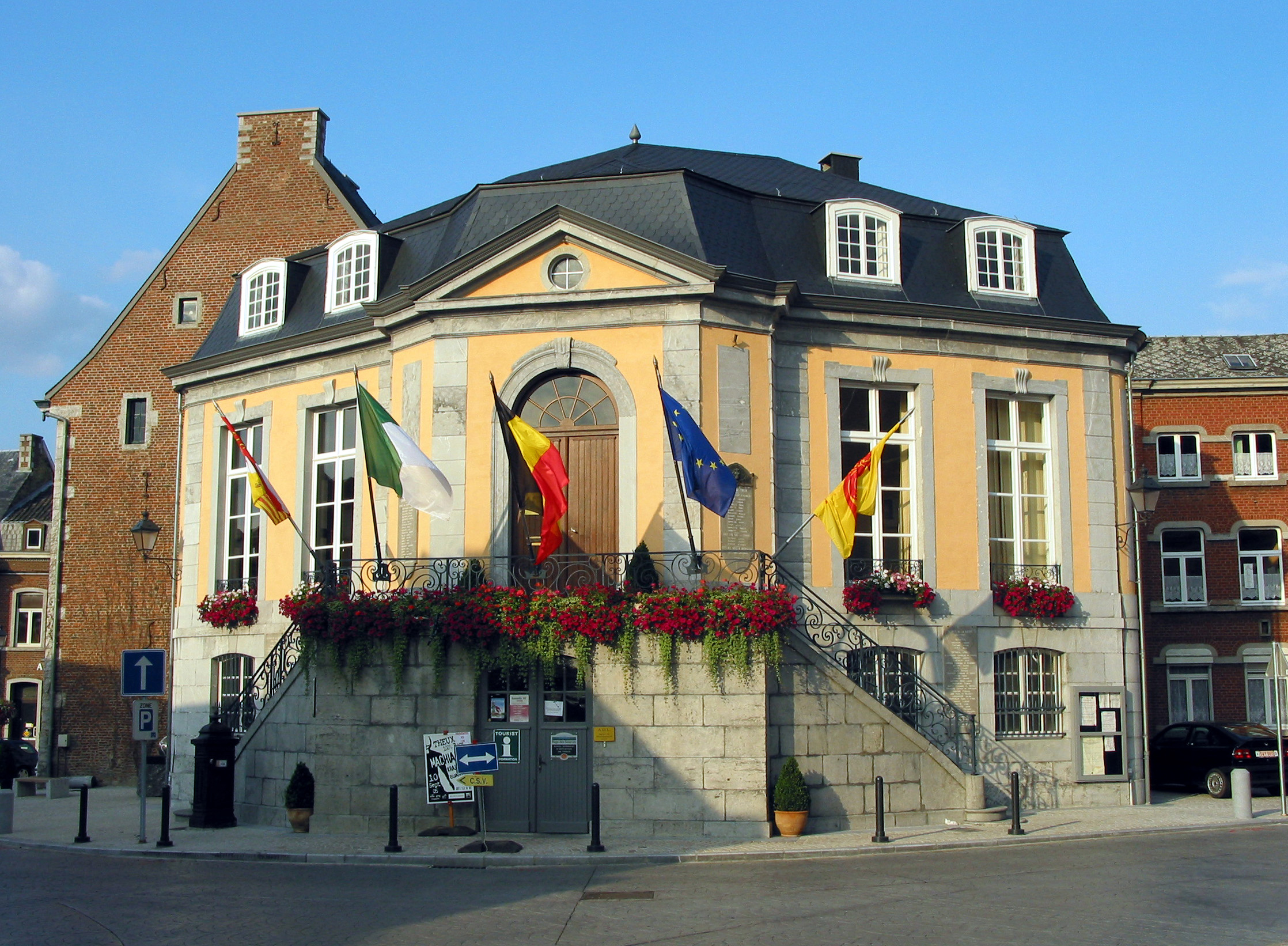
Town Hall of Theux

== See also ==
- List of protected heritage sites in Theux
