= Belgian honours order of wearing =

Order of precedence of Belgian national orders and awards. Grey text indicates dormant awards.

The list is established based on the official current order of precedence as stated in military regulations, combined with the list established in 1985 by Charles Borné. As an official order of precedence including all medals ever created by Belgium was never established, currently obsolete commemorative medals are excluded from this list.

Order of precedence of Belgian national orders and medals
Grand Cordon, Order of Leopold	Grand Cross, Order of the African Star	Grand Cross, Order of the lion	Grand Cross, Order of the Crown	Grand Cross, Order of Leopold II
Grand Officer, Order of Leopold	Grand Officer, Order of the African Star	Grand Officer, Order of the lion	Grand Officer, Order of the Crown	Grand Officer, Order of Leopold II
Commander, Order of Leopold	Commander, Order of the African Star	Commander, Order of the lion	Commander, Order of the Crown	Commander, Order of Leopold II
Officer, Order of Leopold	Officer, Order of the African Star	Officer, Order of the lion	Officer, Order of the Crown	Officer, Order of Leopold II
Knight, Order of Leopold	Knight, Order of the African Star	Knight, Order of the lion	Knight, Order of the Crown	Knight, Order of Leopold II
Golden palms, Order of the Crown	Silver palms, Order of the Crown	Gold medal, Order of the African star	Gold medal, Order of the lion	Gold medal, Order of the crown
Gold medal, Order of Leopold II	Silver medal, Order of the African star	Silver medal, Order of the lion	Silver medal, Order of the Crown	Silver medal, Order of Leopold II
Bronze medal, Order of the African star	Bronze medal, Order of the lion	Silver medal, Bronze of the Crown	Silver medal, Bronze of Leopold II	Military decoration for exceptional services or gallantry
Civil Decoration for bravery	Cargenie hero fund medal	War cross, WW I	War cross, WW II	War cross
Armed resistance medal	Yser medal	Fire cross	Political prisoner's cross, WW II	Maritime decoration, WW I
Maritime medal, WW II	Civil decoration, WW I	Civil decoration, WW II	Escaper's cross	King Albert medal
Queen Elisabeth medal	Belgian gratitude medal	Volunteer combatant medal, WW I	War volunteer medal, WW II	WW I Victory medal
WW I commemorative medal	WW II commemorative medal	Foreign operational theatres medal	Prisoner of War medal	Deportees' cross, WW I
Civil disobedience medal	Military combatant medal, WW II	Military Cross	Military decoration, faithful service	Civil decoration, faithful service
Cross of honour for service abroad	Armed humanitarian operations medal	Foreign operations medal	Homeland operations medal	Meritorious service medal

== See also ==
- Orders, decorations, and medals of Belgium
