= Civic Guard Merit Medal =

Medal of Merit of the Civil Guard
- Type: Military decoration
- Awarded for: Distinguished service
- Presented by: Kingdom of Belgium
- Eligibility: Members of the Belgian Civic guard
- Clasps: None
- Status: Abolished
- Established: 19 November 1830
- First award: 1830
- Final award: 1830

Highlights
- Total: 5
- Total awarded posthumously: 0
- Total recipients: 5

The Medal of Merit of the Civil Guard (Dutch: medaille van verdienste van de burgerwacht, French: Médaille du mérite de la garde civique) is a decoration of Belgium. It was established on 18 November 1830 and was awarded to members of the Belgian Civil Guard for distinguished service.

== Insignia ==
The medal is circular and gold-plated. the obverse bears a climbing lion holding up a lance surmounted by a phrenic cap, symbolizing liberty and freedom. Below the lion, the name of the creator of the medal is written (Braemt F.). The reverse of the medal shows a wreath similar to the one surrounding the Maltese cross of the Order of Leopold, being a wreath of laurel (left) and oak leaves (right). Within, the French text "recompense civique" (civil reward) is written.

=== Ribbon ===
The ribbon is 35 mm wide and consists of the following stripes:

1. 5,6 mm Red;
2. 1,6 mm Dark green;
3. 5,6 mm White;
4. 1,6 mm Dark green;
5. 11,3 mm Red;
6. 1,6 mm Dark green;
7. 5,6 mm White;
8. 1,6 mm Dark green;
9. 5,6 mm Red;

== Award conditions ==
The medal was awarded by the Belgian provisional government to members of the Belgian Civil Guard for distinguished service. Only five medals were ever awarded.

== Order of precedence ==
The order of precedence of the medal was never formally established.

== Recipients ==
1. Baron Emmanuel van der Linden d'Hooghvorst
2. Colonel Knight Van Coeckelberghe de Dudzele
3. Major François Michiels
4. An unknown sergeant
5. An unknown member of the guard

== See also ==
- Orders, decorations, and medals of Belgium
- Belgian honours order of wearing
