= Aimée Bologne-Lemaire =

Aimee Lemaire

Aimée Bologne-Lemaire (French pronunciation: [ɛme bɔlɔɲ ləmɛʁ]; 6 January 1904 – 20 December 1998) was a Belgian feminist, member of the resistance, and Walloon activist.

Estelle Aimée Lemaire was born into a middle-class family in Saint-Gilles, Belgium. Her father was a lawyer, socialist and university professor; her mother was a school teacher. Aimée studied at the ULB, where she joined the student socialist society, graduating in 1926. She became a teacher, first in Charleroi, then in Ixelles until 1943, then returning to Charleroi to take up the post of director of the Athénée Royal Vauban.

In 1929 she married Maurice Bologne, an activist in the Parti Ouvrier Belge, predecessor of the modern Belgian socialist parties (Socialist Party and Socialist Party – Different). During the 1930s, the couple were active in left-wing circles, including support for the International Brigades during the Spanish Civil War and membership in the Comité de vigilance des intellectuels antifascistes. In 1938 Lemaire-Bologne was among the founder-members of the "Historical Society for the Defence of Walloon Culture".

During the German occupation of Belgium in the Second World War, she was associated with the Wallonie Libre organisation. She continued to work for a Walloon cultural renaissance, and headed the Wallonia-Association's female arm, which attempted to save Jewish children from deportation, and to feed undernourished children. She also undertook clandestine work distributing socialist newspapers, and running the secretariat of the banned Socialist Party. In 1943, as a result of her work in thwarting the German efforts to conscript young women in Charleroi into German industry (the so-called arbeitseinsatz), she was obliged to go into hiding.

After the war, Bologne-Lemaire was a participant at the Walloon national congress in 1945. She returned to teaching in Charleroi, retiring in 1961. In 1960 she joined the board of the Institut Jules Destrée. She joined the Walloon Front, a movement which turned into the Walloon Rally party in 1968. She was president of the women's branch from 1970 to 1976. As well as writing two books, she provided numerous articles for Wallonie Libre and Forces Wallonnes. Along with her husband, she was a signatory to the Manifesto for Walloon culture in 1983.

She was the recipient of several Belgian honours, being made an officer of the Order of Leopold II and a knight of the Order of Léopold. She also received the Civilian Resistance Medal for her wartime work.

Aimée Bologne-Lemaire died at Nalinnes-lez-Charleroi in 1998.

== Works by Aimée Bologne-Lemaire ==
- Arille Carlier ou La conscience wallonne. Nalinnes-lez-Charleroi: Institut Jules Destrée, 1969
- Jules Destrée : 21 août 1863-2 janvier 1936. Mont-sur-Marchienne: Institut Jules Destrée, 1976.
