= Political Prisoner's Medal 1914–1918 =

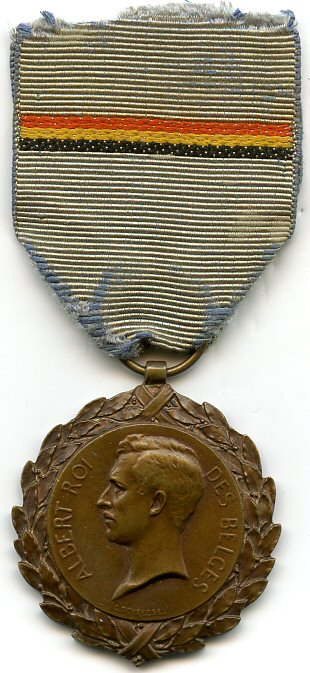
- Political Prisoner's Medal 1914–1918 (obverse)
- Type: War medal
- Awarded for: Detention by the Germans following an act of courage or devotion towards the Allies' cause
- Presented by: Kingdom of Belgium
- Eligibility: Belgian citizens
- Status: No longer awarded
- Established: 26 December 1930

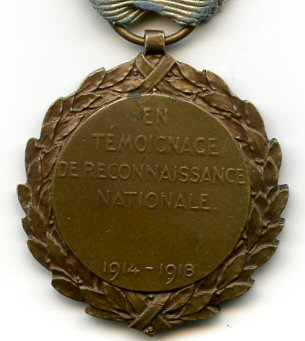
Reverse of the Medal

The Political Prisoner's Medal 1914–1918 (Dutch: Medaille van de Politieke Gevangene 1914–1918 French: Médaille du Prisonnier Politique 1914–1918) was a Belgian medal established by royal decree on 26 December 1930 and awarded to Belgian civilians who were detained for a minimum of one month by the Germans during the First World War following an act of courage or devotion towards the Allies' cause.

Recipients of this medal automatically received the 1914–1918 Commemorative War Medal and the Inter-Allied Victory Medal 1914–1918.

== Award description ==
The Political Prisoner's Medal 1914–1918 was identical to the King Albert Medal except for the ribbon. It was a 35 mm (1.4 in) in diameter circular bronze medal. Its obverse bore a 25 mm (0.98 in) in diameter central medallion bearing the left profile of King Albert I with the inscription in French or in Dutch "ALBERT KING OF THE BELGIANS" (French: "ALBERT ROI DES BELGES") (Dutch: "ALBERT KONING DER BELGEN") surrounded by a 5mm wide laurel wreath along the entire medal circumference. On the reverse of the central medallion, the relief inscription on four lines in French or in Dutch "IN TESTIMONY OF NATIONAL RECOGNITION" (French: "EN TEMOIGNAGE DE RECONNAISSANCE NATIONALE") (Dutch: "ALS BLIJK VAN'S LANDS ERKENTELIJKHEID") with the years "1914–1918" at the bottom.

The medal was suspended by a ring through a suspension loop from a 38mm wide light blue silk moiré ribbon bearing a single 4.5 mm (0.18 in) high horizontal central stripe in the national colours of Belgium (1.5 mm red, 1.5 mm yellow and 1.5 mm black).

== Notable recipients (partial list) ==
The individuals listed below were awarded the Political Prisoner's Medal:

- Aviator Major General Norbert Leboutte

== See also ==
- Orders, decorations, and medals of Belgium

== Other sources ==
- Quinot H., 1950, Recueil illustré des décorations belges et congolaises, 4e Edition. (Hasselt)
- Cornet R., 1982, Recueil des dispositions légales et réglementaires régissant les ordres nationaux belges. 2e Ed. N.pl., (Brussels)
- Borné A.C., 1985, Distinctions honorifiques de la Belgique, 1830–1985 (Brussels)
