= Medal for Services Rendered =

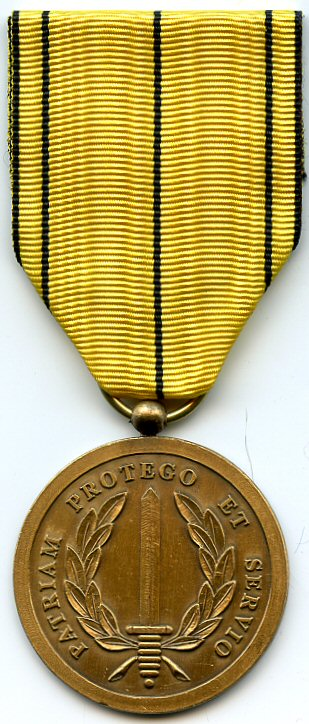
- Medal for Services Rendered (obverse)
- Type: Military service medal
- Awarded for: Service in particularly difficult circumstances over an extended time period
- Presented by: Kingdom of Belgium
- Eligibility: Belgian soldiers
- Status: Dormant
- Established: never

The Medal for Services Rendered (French: Médaille pour Services Rendus, Dutch: Medaille voor Bewezen Diensten) is a Belgian military service medal that was proposed to be created on 18 April 1988 by ministerial decree. It was intended to be awarded to members of the army, navy, air force and medical services of the Belgian Armed Forces for service rendered in particularly difficult circumstances over an extended time period. However, the creation of the medal was presented to the Council of State under the form of a ministerial decree and the Council ruled that the creation of such an award should be done by the King, thus via a Royal Decree. As a Royal Decree was never adopted, the medal was never officially created and has not or cannot be awarded.

== Award description ==
The Medal for Services Rendered is a 36mm in diameter circular bronze medal. Its obverse bears a relief vertical broadsword pointing up superimposed over the base of a laurel wreath. Inscribed in relief along the medal circumference, the Latin inscription "PATRIAM PROTEGO ET SERVIO" roughly translating into "I PROTECT AND SERVE MY COUNTRY". The reverse of the medal is smooth and plain.

The medal hangs by a ring through a suspension loop from a 37 mm wide yellow silk moiré ribbon with five longitudinal black stripes. The black stripes are positioned as follows, one in the center, one on each edge, the last two are 4 mm from the edges. The width of the stripes varies according to ribbon type. The type 1 ribbon has 2 mm edge stripes, 1 mm inner stripes and a 3 mm central stripe, the type 2 ribbon has five equal 1 mm stripes.

== See also ==
- Orders, decorations, and medals of Belgium

== Other sources ==
- Quinot H., 1950, Recueil illustré des décorations belges et congolaises, 4e Edition. (Hasselt)
- Cornet R., 1982, Recueil des dispositions légales et réglementaires régissant les ordres nationaux belges. 2e Ed. N.pl., (Brussels)
- Borné A.C., 1985, Distinctions honorifiques de la Belgique, 1830-1985 (Brussels)
