= Labour Decoration =

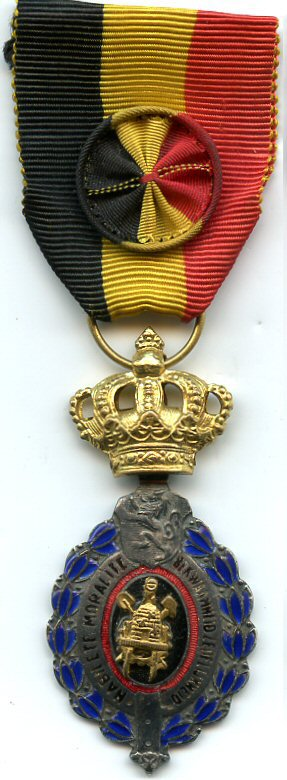
- Labour Decorations 1st class (obverse)
- Type: Long service award
- Awarded for: Long service in the private sector or as contractual employees of the public sector
- Presented by: Kingdom of Belgium
- Eligibility: Workers having a relationship with Belgium
- Status: Active
- Established: 7 November 1847

The Labour Decoration (French: Décoration du Travail, Dutch: Ereteken van de Arbeid) is a Belgian labour long service medal originally established on 7 November 1847 under the name "Industrial and Agricultural Decoration". Its statute and design were reformed in 1958, since when it has retained its present name and design. The Labour Decoration is awarded to those who use their knowledge, talent and dedication in the pursuit of their work for a specified time. It is awarded by the Belgian Ministry of Employment and Labour.

== Award statute ==
=== Classes ===
The Labour Decoration is awarded in two classes:

- The first class is awarded to those who can demonstrate thirty years of professional activity. Craftsmen who are not employees may be awarded the first class award if they can demonstrate twenty years of independent work in Belgium after their twenty-first birthday.
- The second class is awarded to those who can demonstrate twenty-five years of professional activity.

The decoration first class may also be awarded posthumously to workers who have been the victims of a fatal accident in the workplace, without consideration of age or citizenship.

=== Administrative procedures ===
The request for award of the decoration to a specific worker is usually submitted to the Ministry by the worker's employer or professional union. However, when this is not possible (such as when the worker is an independent craftsman without a professional union), the worker may file the request themselves. The worker must be a resident of Belgium, although they may have worked in a foreign country for a Belgian company or worked in Belgium while residing in a different country. The Decoration may be awarded to workers in the private sector and to contractual employees of the public sector.

After having been verified by the local authorities, applications are scrutinised by the Ministry of Employment and Labour, where the decision to award the Decoration or not will be taken. Award ceremonies are usually held on 8 April, 21 July and 15 November of each year.

=== Award of national orders ===
After the Labour Decoration, workers may later also be awarded the gold medal and the golden palms of the Order of the Crown respectively after thirty-five and forty-five years of professional activity, or in the latter case, forty years at the time of retirement. The Knight's Cross of the Order of Leopold II may be awarded to workers after fifty-five years of professional activity.

== Award description ==
The insignia of the Labour Decoration is oval and made of silver, surrounded by a blue enamelled laurel wreath, with in its center a black enamelled oval medallion surrounded by a red enamelled border and in the center an emblem made of a beehive, a hammer and a compass and topped by the coat of arms of Belgium. The insignia is suspended by a ring through a lateral suspension loop through the orb of a pivot mounted royal crown. The reverse of the insignia is plain. The emblem and the royal crown are silver for the second class decoration and gold for the first class.

The ribbon of the Labour Decoration has three longitudinal stripes of equal width in the national colours of Belgium, black, yellow and red. The ribbon of the decoration first class is adorned with a rosette in the same colours. The ribbon of the Labour Decoration awarded posthumously is adorned with a black enameled clasp with silver text in Flemish and French stating deceased at work.

== See also ==
- Orders, decorations, and medals of Belgium
