= Commemorative Medals for Army Marches =

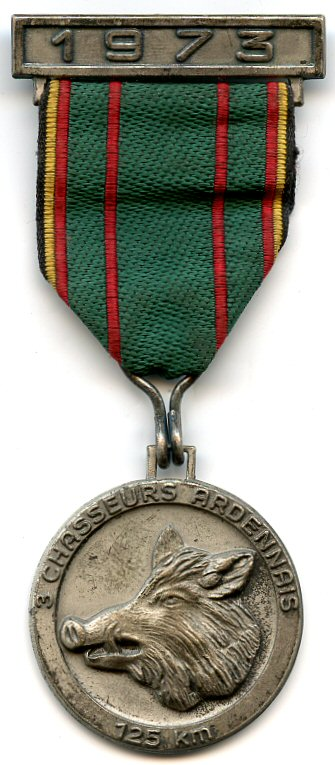
MESA commemorative medal

The Commemorative Medals for Army Marches are two distinct medals awarded for participating in the two marches organised yearly by the Belgian Army. They are not decorations, but they may be worn by members of the Belgian Armed Forces on their uniform during the year following the participation if they request it. For members of the Belgian Army, participating in the marches counts as operational training.

== Marche Européenne du Souvenir et de l'Amitié (MESA) ==
The European March of Remembrance and Friendship is a four-day international march originally organised in 1967 by the 3rd Battalion of the Ardennes Chasseur Regiment in remembrance of the operations performed by the unit at the beginning of World War II in the Ardennes region. The march is now organised on a yearly basis and also focusses on honouring the towns in the region regularly changing its course to do so. The march is divided into four legs of thirty-two kilometers each in the Ardennes region of Belgium as well as the Grand Duchy of Luxemburg.

The circular silver medal bears on its obverse the relief left profile of a wild boar's head surrounded by a 3mm wide ring along the entire medal's circumference and bearing the relief inscription "3 CHASSEURS ARDENNAIS" in the upper half and "125 km" at the bottom. The reverse bears the relief inscription on four lines "MARCHE" "DU SOUVENIR" "ET DE L'AMITIE" "ARLON-VIELSALM". The medal hangs from a ribbon secured by a hook through a suspension loop at its top. The medal is secured to clothing with a safety pin backed metal clasp displaying in relief the year of the event, or in the case of older medals, the inscription M.S.A. or M.S.E.A.. The ribbon is dark green with the national colours of Belgium in three narrow 1mm edge stripes and two narrow 1mm wide red stripes centered 1 cm apart on the green field.

== Vierdaagse van de IJzer ==
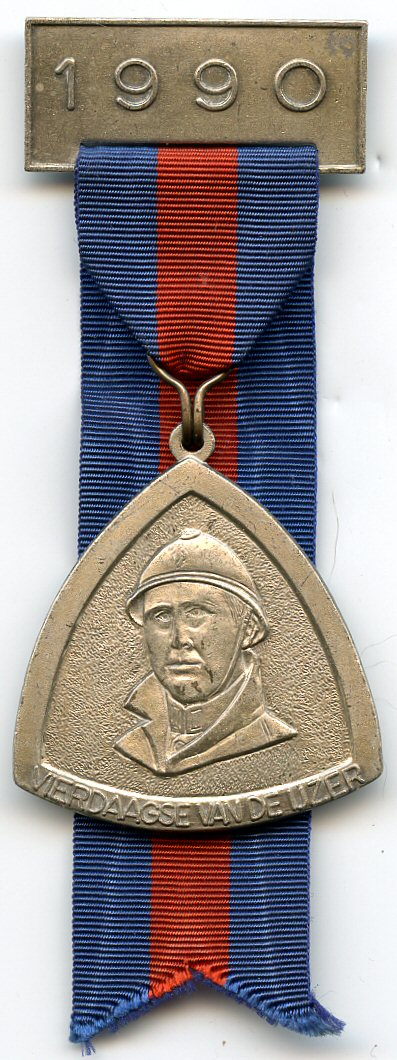
Four Days of the Yser medal with 1990 bar

The Four Days of the Yser is a four-day international march organised since 1967 by the Order of the Horse Fishermen of Oostduinkerke, in order to honour the tradition of shrimping on horseback on the one hand and to emphasize the scenic attractions of the Westhoek, the western part of the Belgian coast. Since 1972 it is organised by the Belgian Armed Forces to strengthen the bond between the Belgian Armed Forces and society, to commemorate the casualties of both World Wars, particularly those who fell on the battlefields of the Westhoek during the First World War, and to introduce the hikers to the historical and touristic values of the Westhoek. The march was initially four times thirty-two kilometers long, but now currently has 8,16,24 and 32 km routes including detours for disabled access and pushchairs. https://4daagse.be/index.php/nl/huidige-editie/aandenkens

The medal is round or triangular, made in silver or bronze, and showing the imprint of King Albert the first, but the shape of the medal can change every five years. The ribbon is dark blue with a large vertical scarlet stripe. Small metal bars are added to the ribbon when the bearer has completed the march more than one time.

== See also ==
- Orders, decorations, and medals of Belgium
