= Commemorative Medal of the Reign of King Albert I =

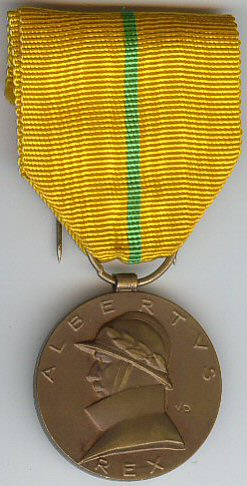
- Commemorative Medal of the Reign of King Albert I (obverse)
- Type: Commemorative medal
- Awarded for: Honourable military service between December 18, 1909 and February 18, 1934
- Presented by: Kingdom of Belgium
- Eligibility: Veterans and serving members of the Belgian Armed Forces
- Status: No longer awarded
- Established: 17 February 1962
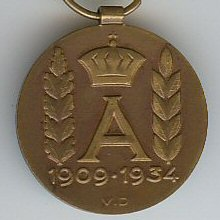
- Reverse of the medal

The Commemorative Medal of the Reign of King Albert I (French: Médaille Commémorative du Règne du Roi Albert I, Dutch: Herinneringsmedaille aan de Regeerperiode van Albert I) was a Belgian military medal established on 17 February 1962 to commemorate the reign of Albert I of Belgium.

It was awarded to serving members of the Belgian Armed Forces and to veterans of the service who served honorably between 18 December 1909 and 18 February 1934.

== Award description ==
The Commemorative Medal of the Reign of King Albert I was a 32mm in diameter circular bronze medal. Its obverse bore the relief left profile of King Albert I wearing a military helmet adorned with a laurel wreath and a military overcoat with the collar up. The relief inscription in Latin along the upper circumference "ALBERTUS" and at the bottom, "REX" meaning "Albert" "King". On the reverse, a large relief capital letter A under a royal crown between two vertical branches, oak at left and laurel at right, at the bottom, the years "1909" and "1934".

The medal was suspended by a ring through the suspension loop from a 38mm wide silk moiré yellow ribbon with a 2mm wide central green stripe.

== Notable recipients (partial list) ==
The individuals listed below were awarded the Commemorative Medal of the Reign of King Albert I:

- Lieutenant General Baron Charles de Cumont
- Lieutenant General Baron Albert Crahay
- Cavalry Lieutenant General Marcel Jooris
- Cavalry Major General Baron Beaudoin de Maere d’Aertrycke

== See also ==
- Orders, decorations, and medals of Belgium

== Other sources ==
- Quinot H., 1950, Recueil illustré des décorations belges et congolaises, 4e Edition. (Hasselt)
- Cornet R., 1982, Recueil des dispositions légales et réglementaires régissant les ordres nationaux belges. 2e Ed. N.pl., (Brussels)
- Borné A.C., 1985, Distinctions honorifiques de la Belgique, 1830-1985 (Brussels)
