= Orders, decorations, and medals of Belgium =

Belgium has established numerous orders of knighthood, decorations and medals since its creation in 1830. Below is a list of those awards. The order of precedence is difficult to establish as Belgium does not keep an up-to-date listing with dormant and active awards. However, André Borné has established such a list that is used as a basis.

== National orders ==
Orders displayed on a white background are active; those on a grey background are dormant or no longer awarded.

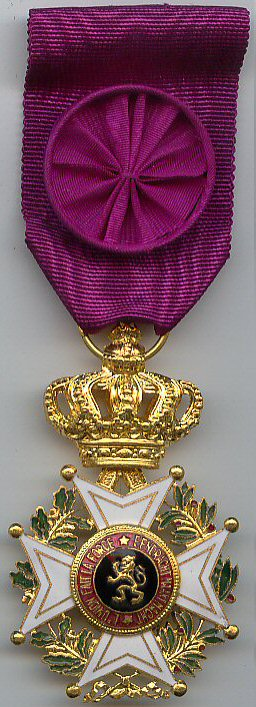
Order of Leopold

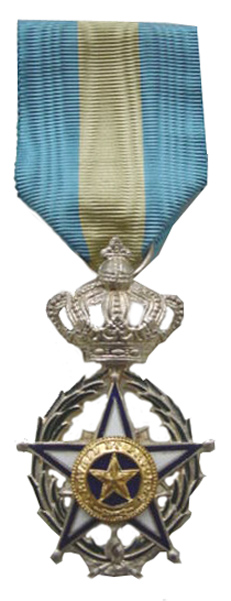
Order of the African Star

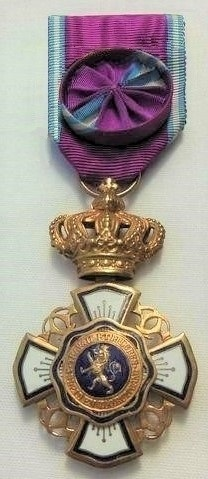
Royal Order of the Lion

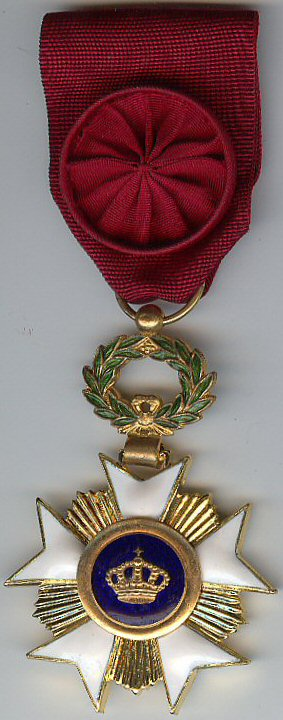
Order of the Crown

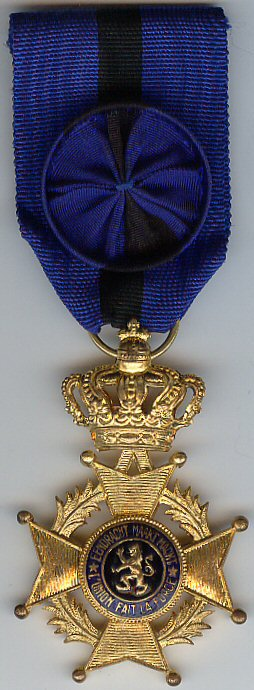
Order of Leopold II

== Current awards and decorations ==
=== Military awards ===
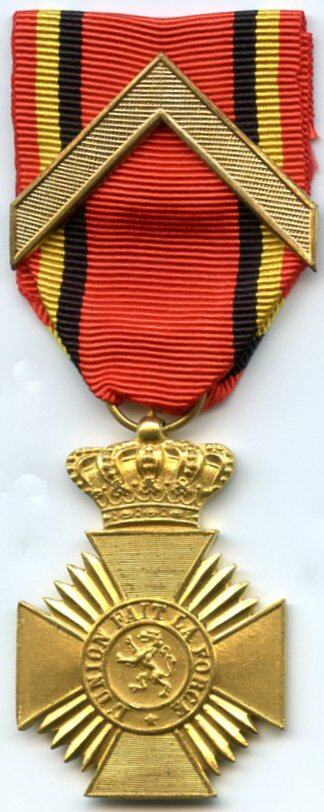
Military decoration for exceptional service or acts of bravery or extraordinary devotion

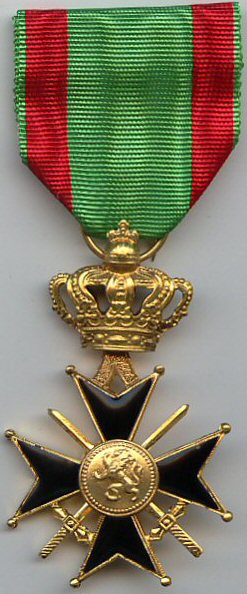
Military Cross

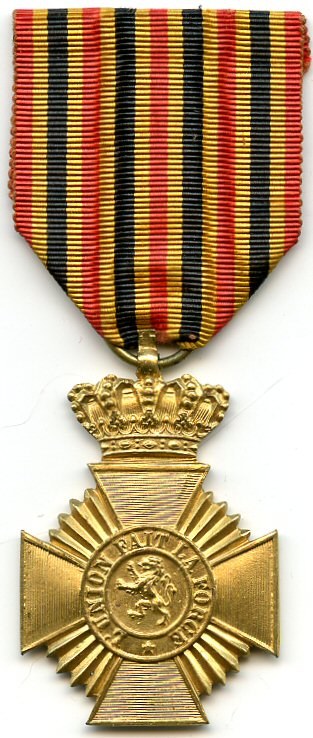
Military Decoration for faithful service

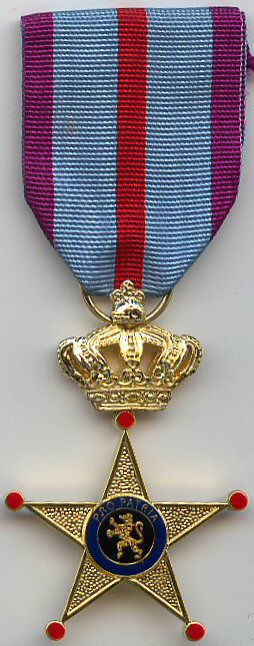
Cross of honour for service abroad

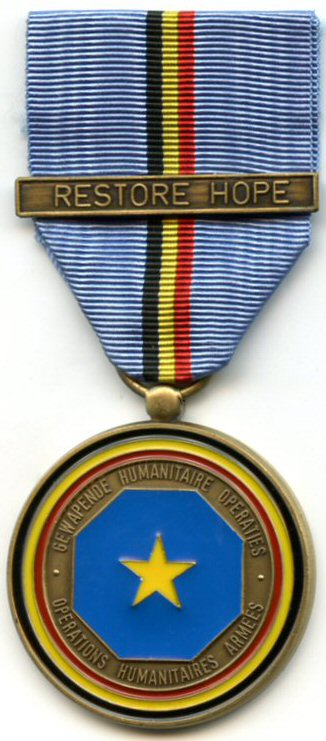
Commemorative medal for armed humanitarian operations

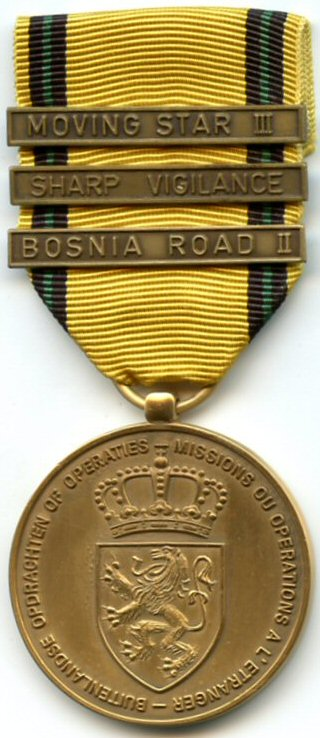
Commemorative medal for foreign missions or operations

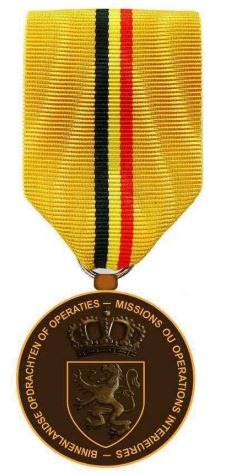
Commemorative medal for missions or operations regarding the operational defense of the territory

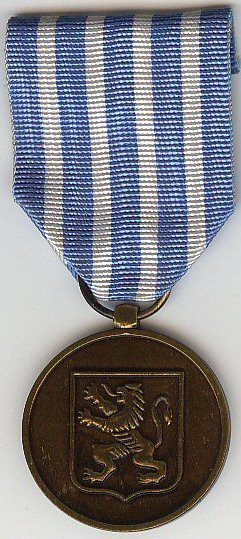
Meritorious service medal

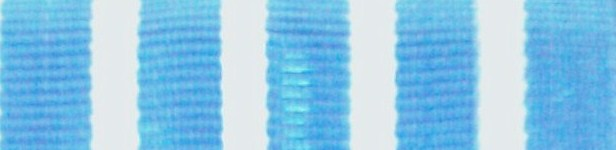

=== Civilian awards ===
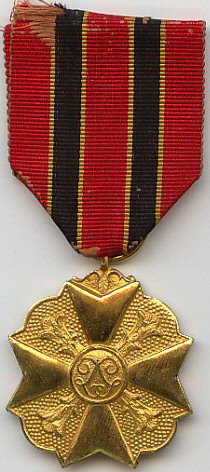
Civil Decoration for acts of bravery, selfsacrifice and philanthropy

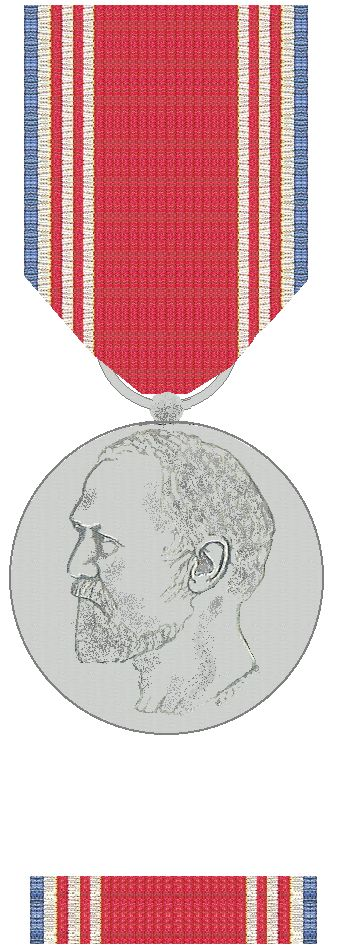
Carnegie hero fund medal

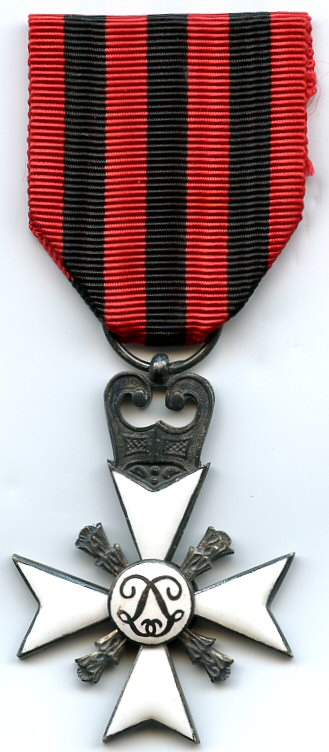
Civil Decoration for long service

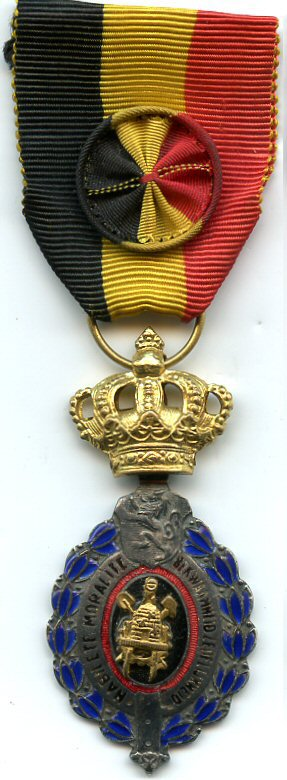
Labour decoration

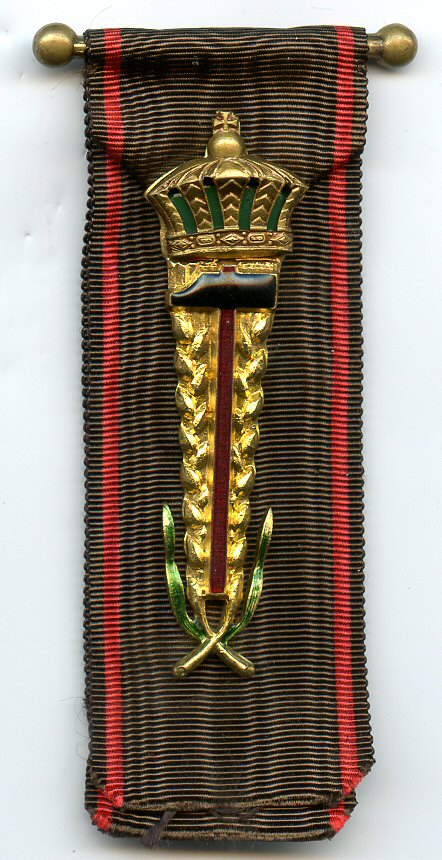
Laureate of labour

=== Military marching medals ===
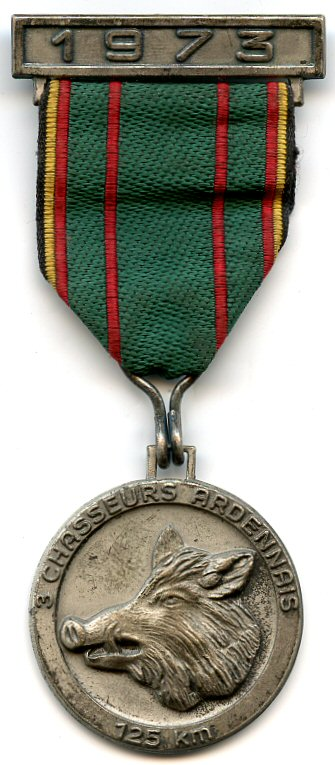
Commemorative medal for the European remembrance and friendship march

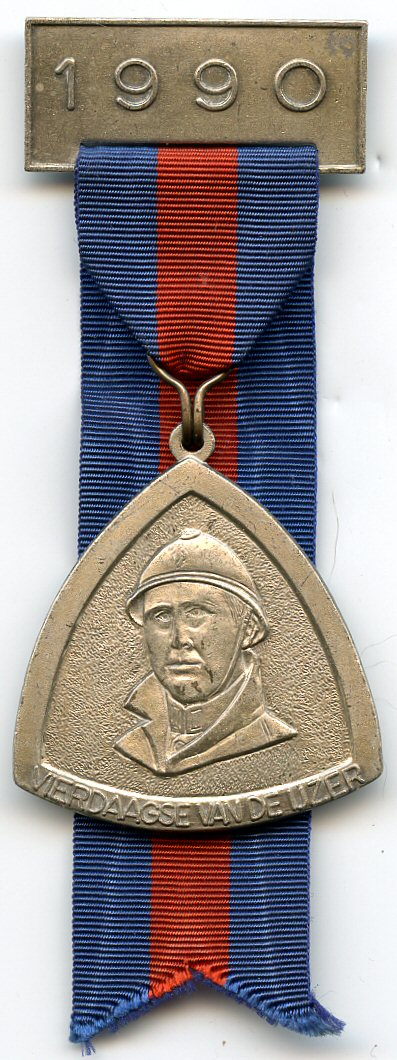
Commemorative medal 'Yser march'

== Historical awards and decorations ==
These medals and decorations are currently no longer awarded.

=== Belgian Revolution (1830–31) ===
Merit medal of the civil guard

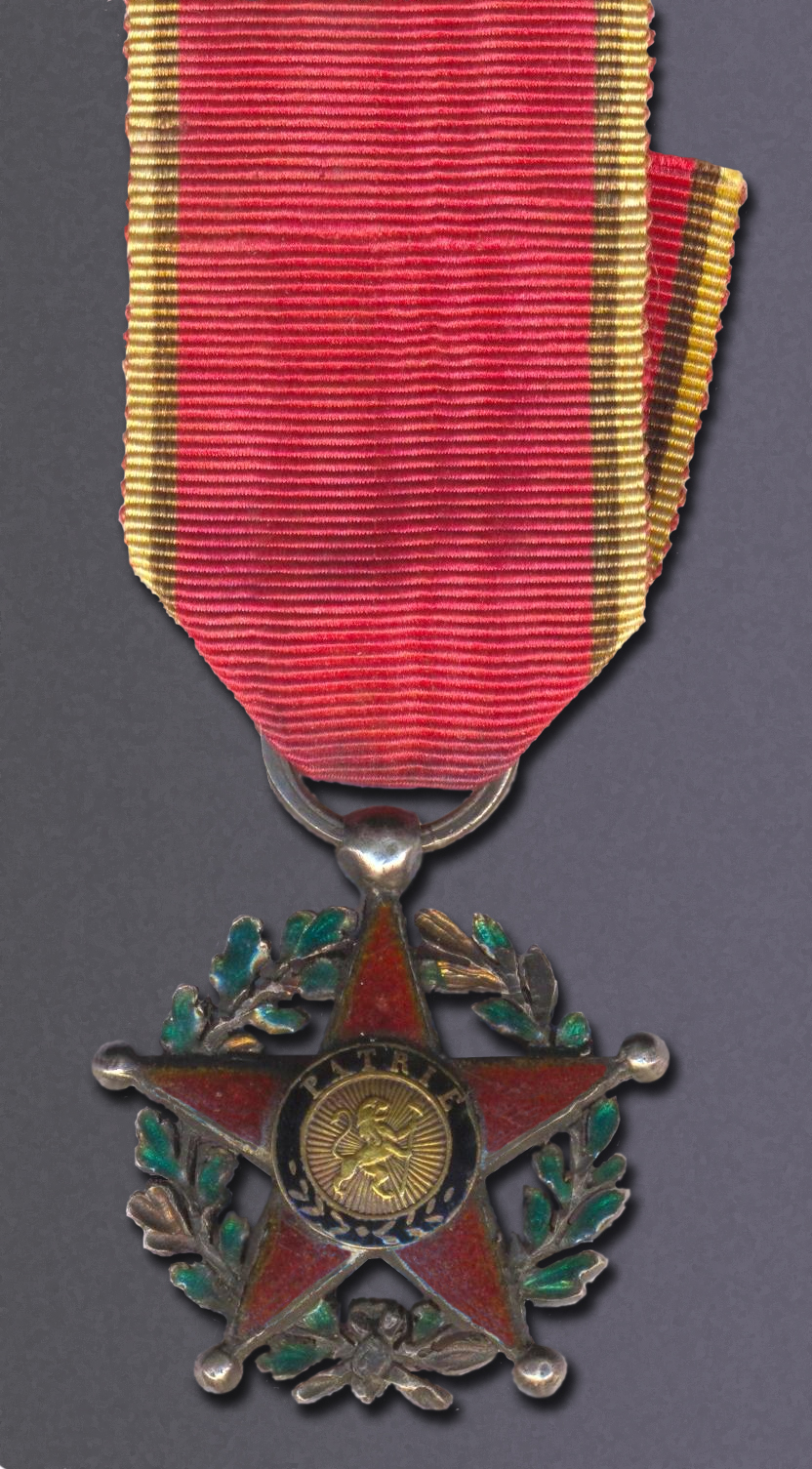
1830 Star of honour

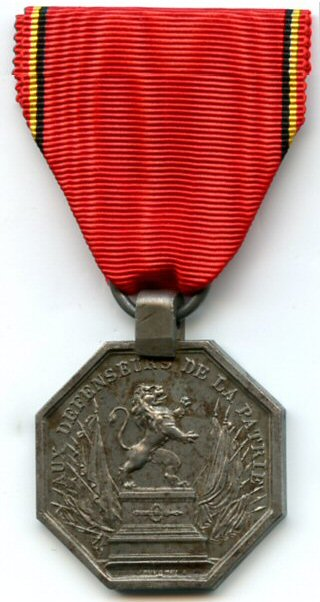
Iron cross and iron medal

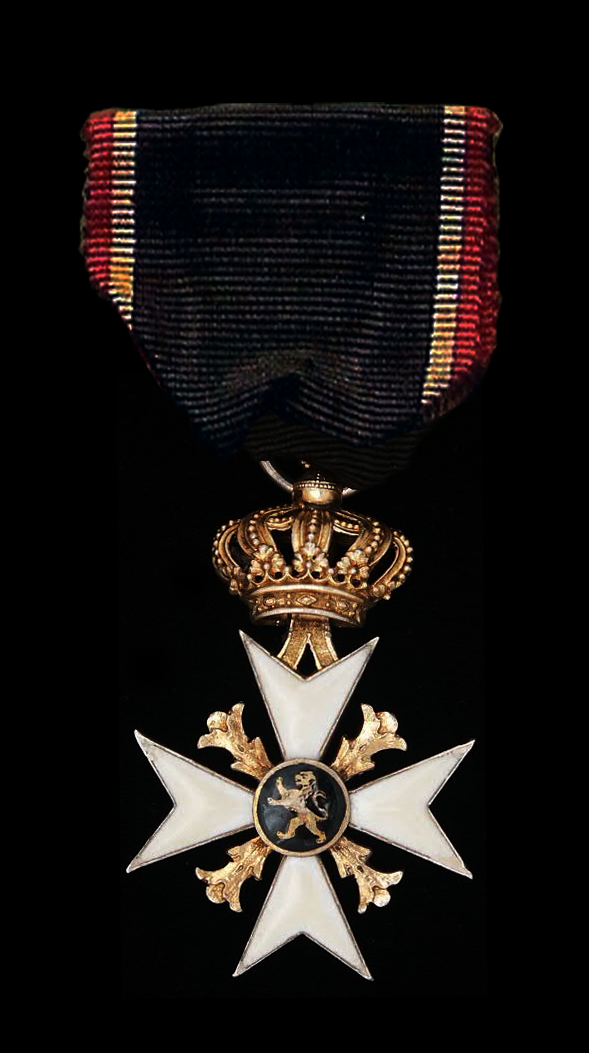
1830 volunteers commemorative cross

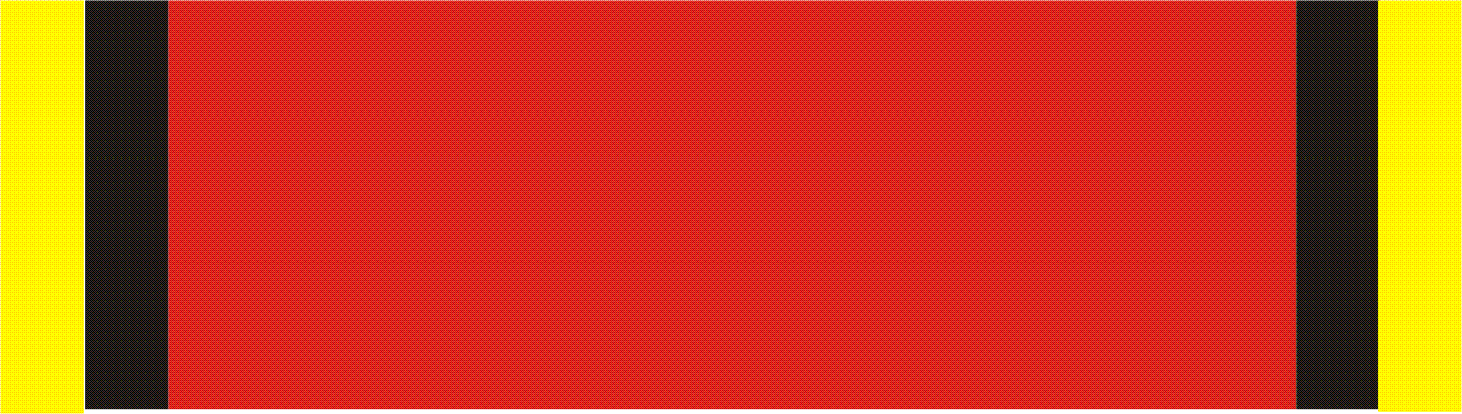

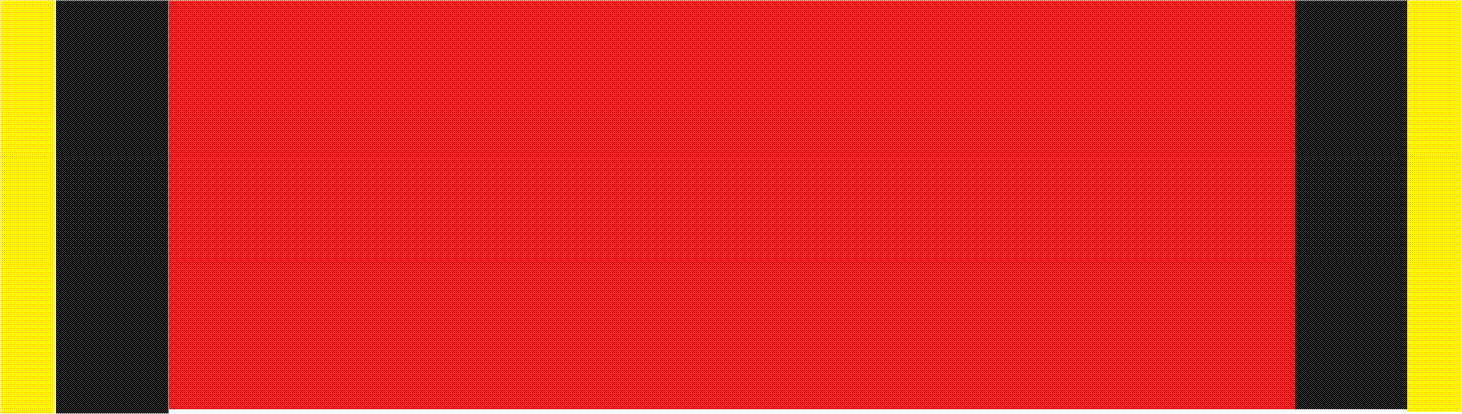

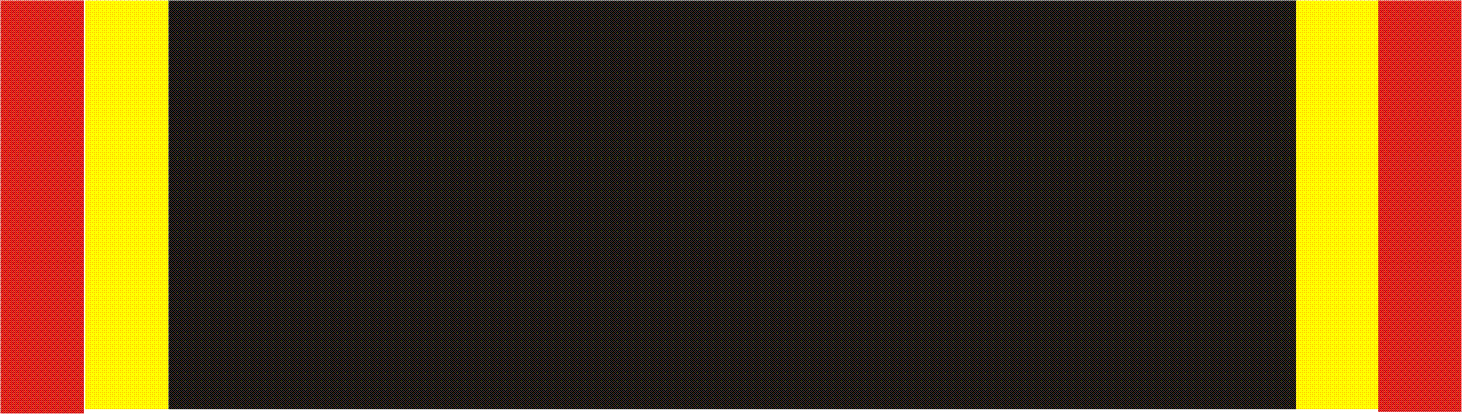

=== World War I (1914–1918) ===
Medals are shown in order of precedence.

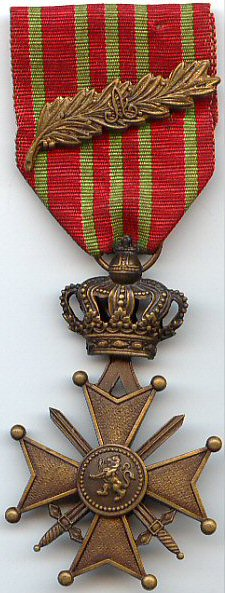
War cross '14-'18

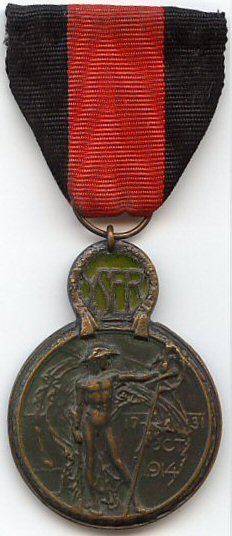
Yser medal

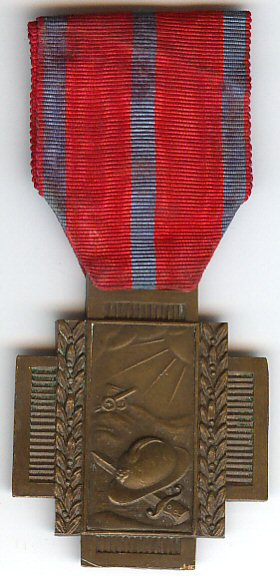
Fire cross

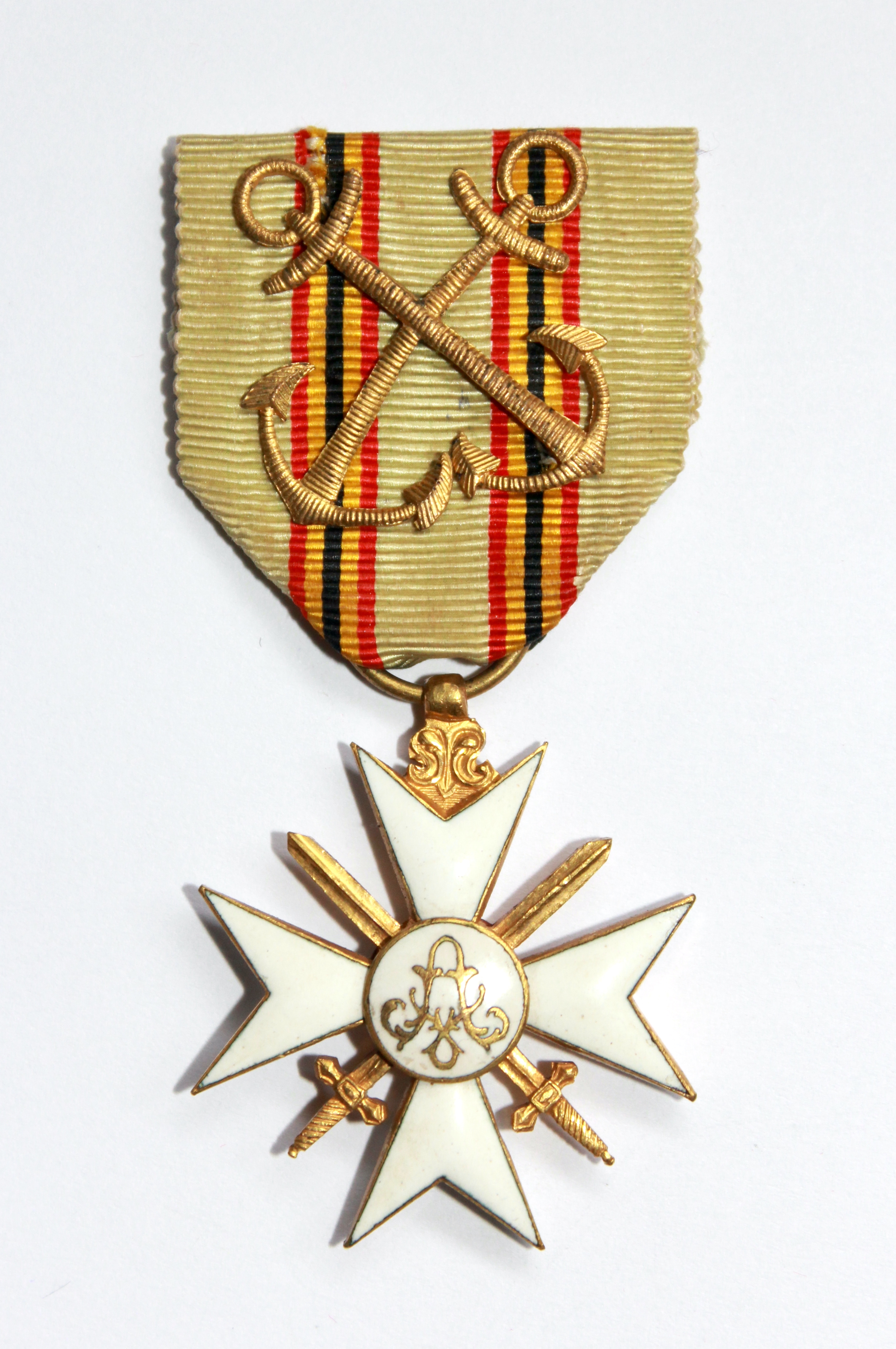
Maritime decoration of the War

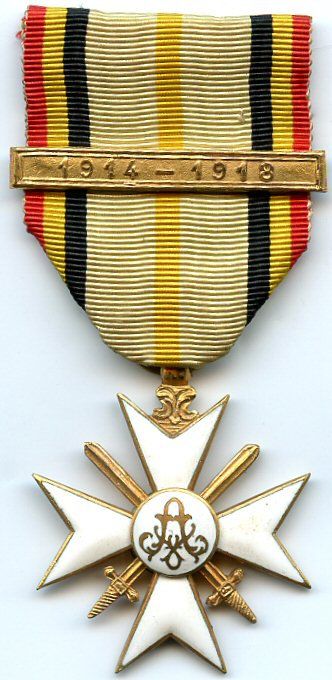
Civil decoration of the War

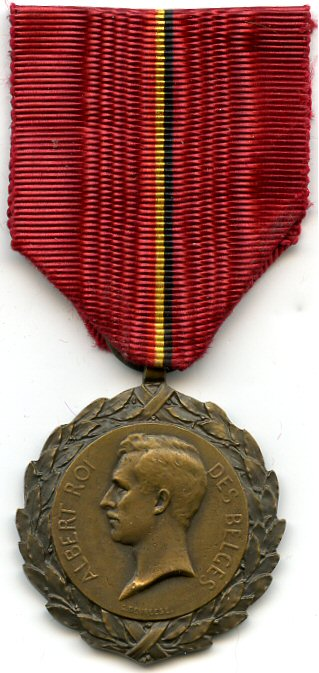
King Albert medal

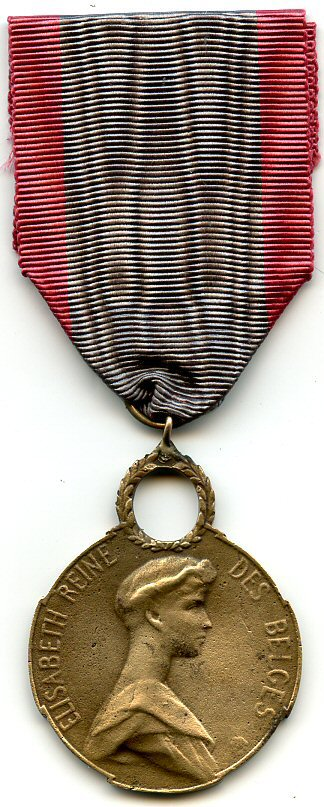
Queen Elisabeth medal

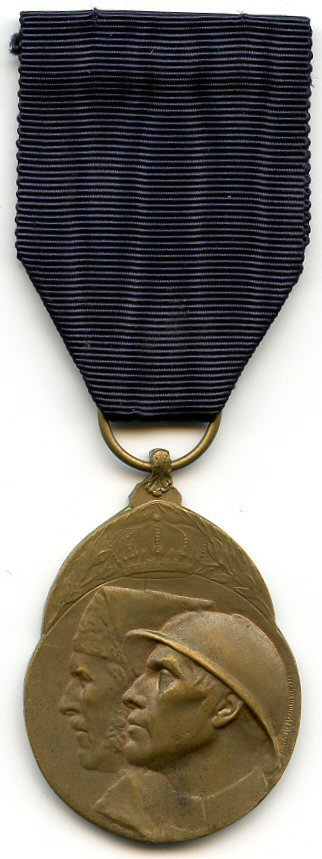
Volunteer combatant medal

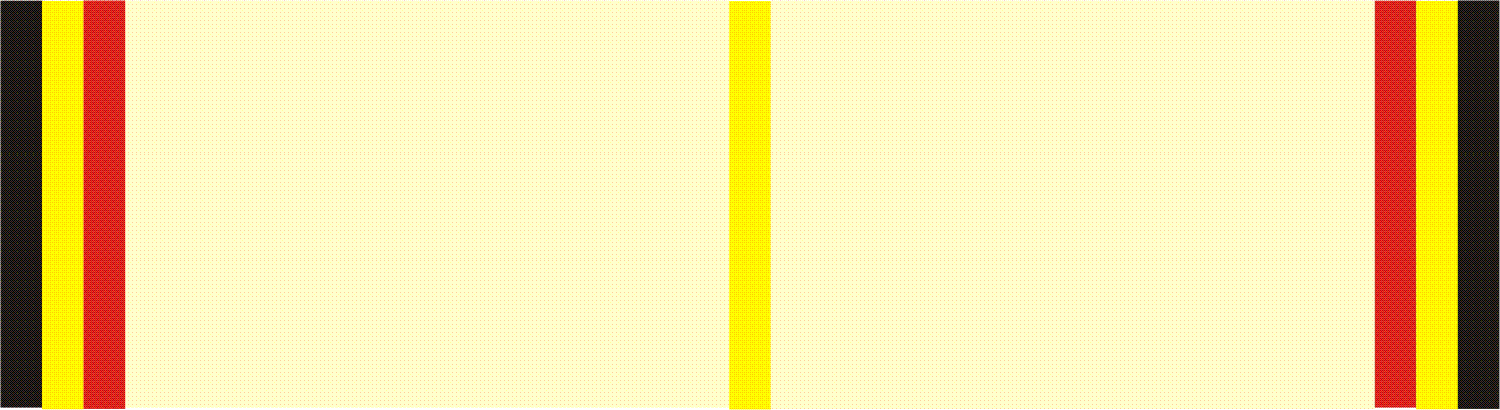

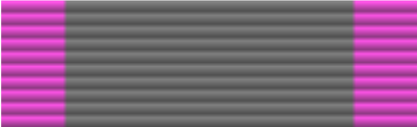

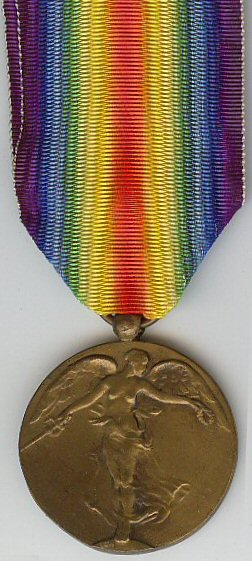
Victory medal '14-'18

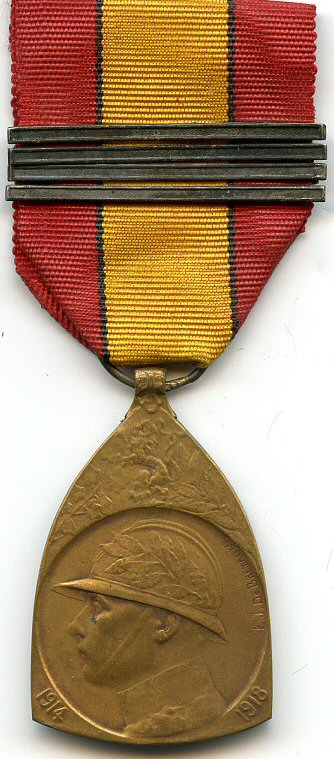
Commemorative medal of the War '14-'18

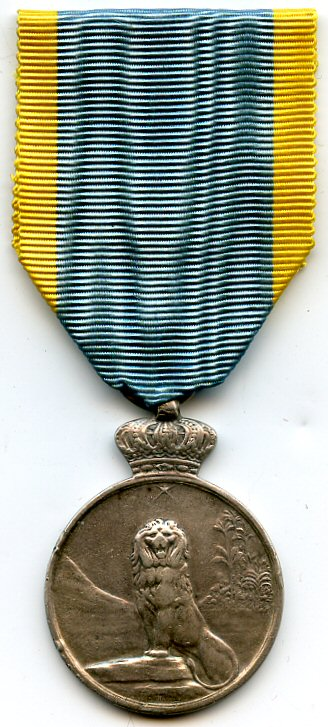
Commemorative medal of the African campaigns '14-'17

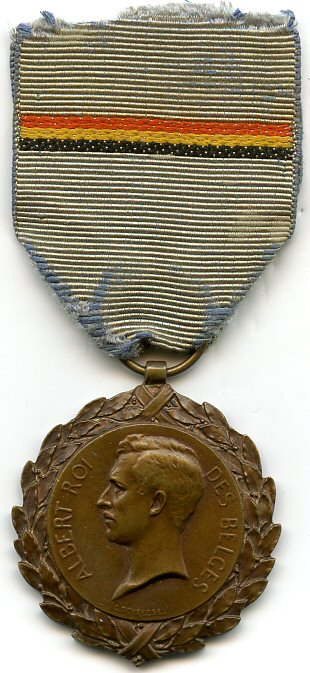
Medal of the political prisoner '14-'18

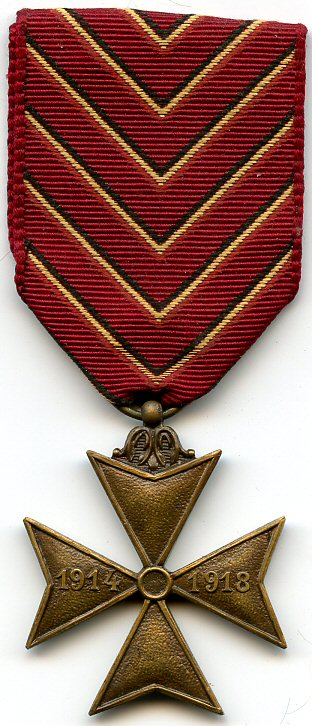
Deportees cross '14-'18

Colonial commemorative medal

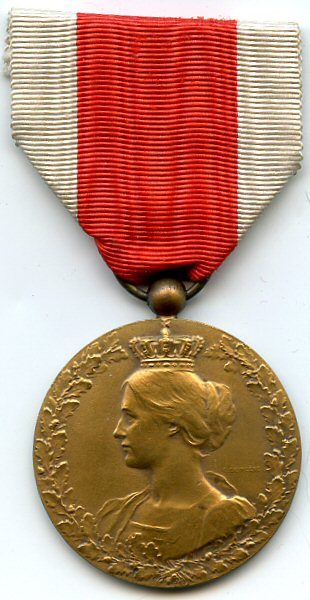
Medal of the national committee for aid and nourishment

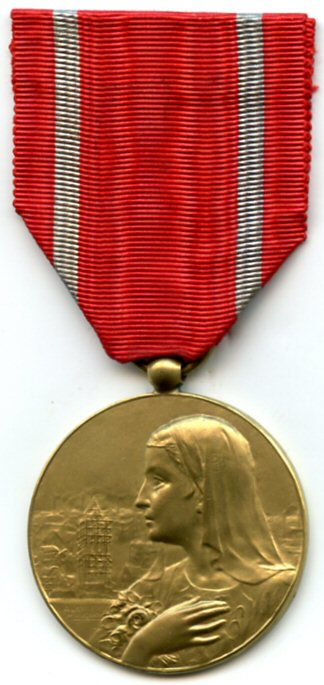
Medal for the national restoration

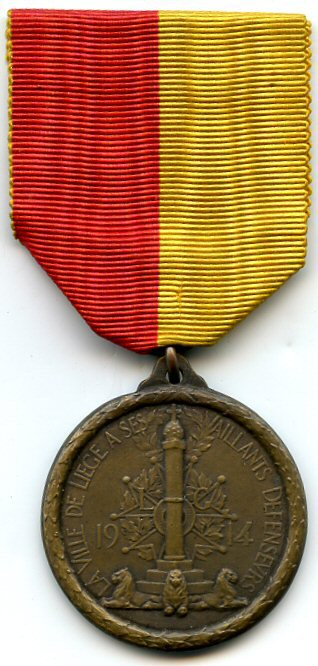
Liège Medal

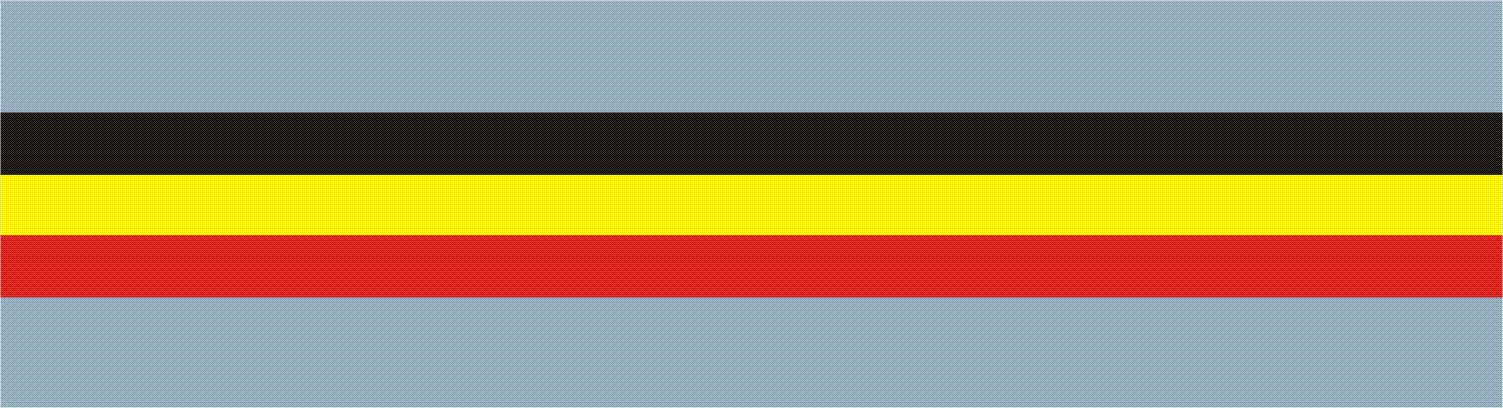

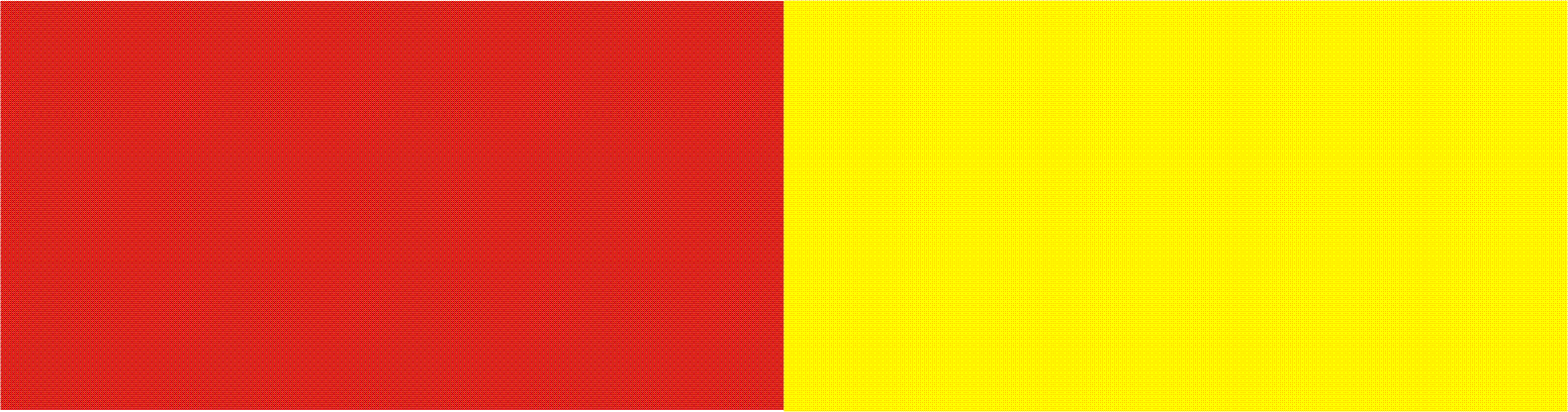

=== World War II (1940–1945) and the Korean War (1954) ===
Medals are shown in order of precedence.

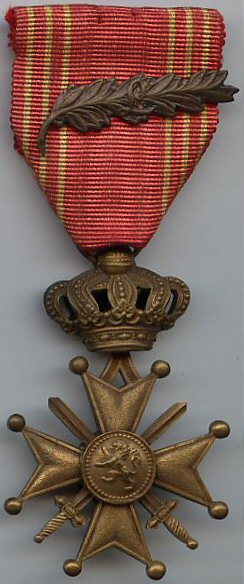
War cross '40-'45

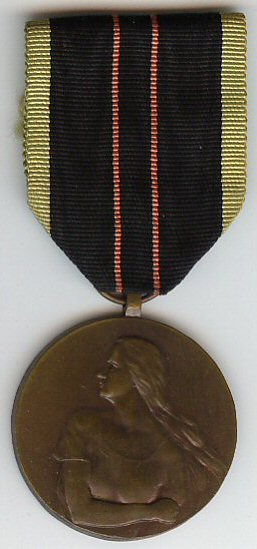
Armed resistance medal

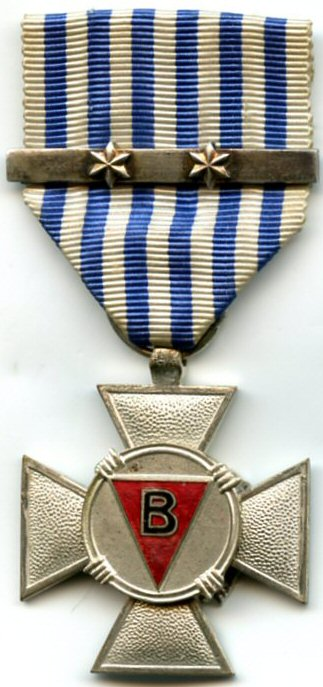
Political prisoner's cross '40-'45

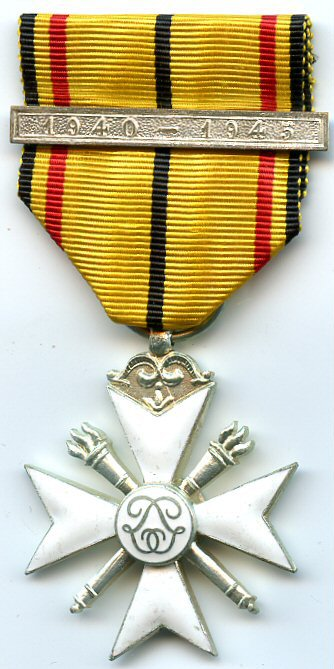
Civil decoration '40-'45

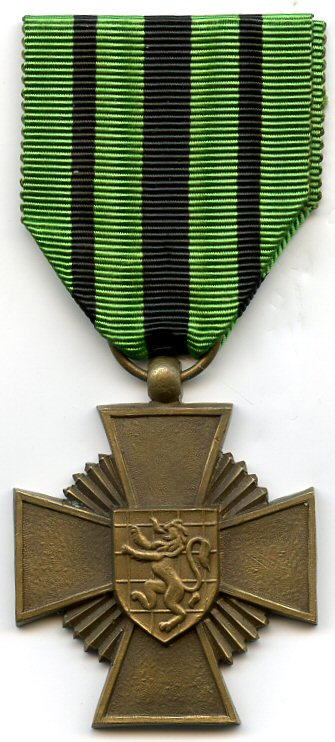
Escaper's cross

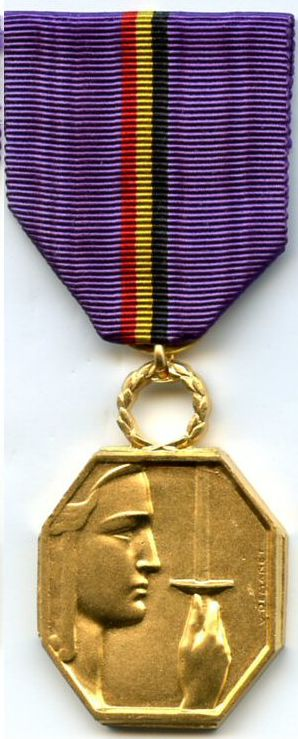
Medal of Belgian gratitude '40–'45

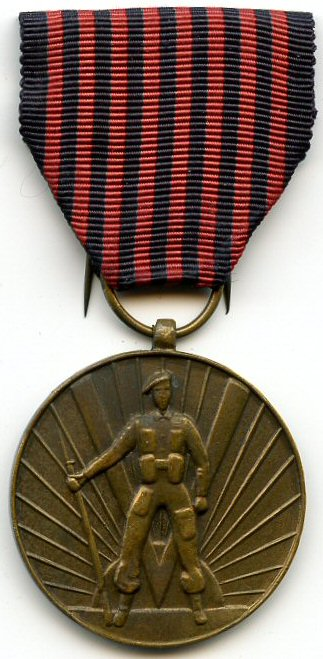
Medal of the war volunteer '40-'45

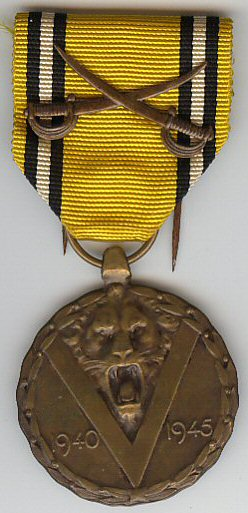
Commemorative medal of the war '40-'45

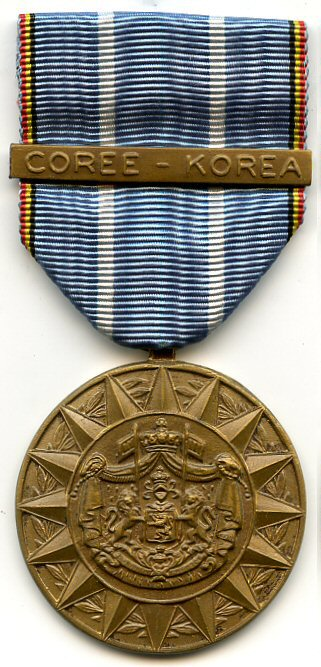
Foreign operational theatres commemorative medal

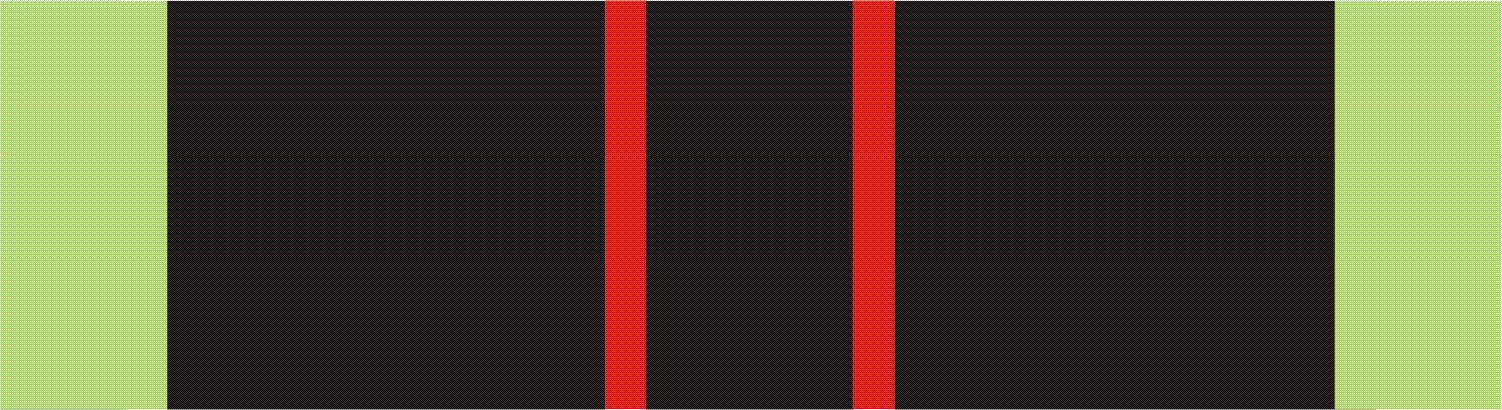

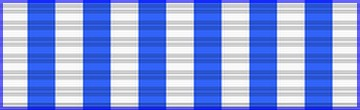

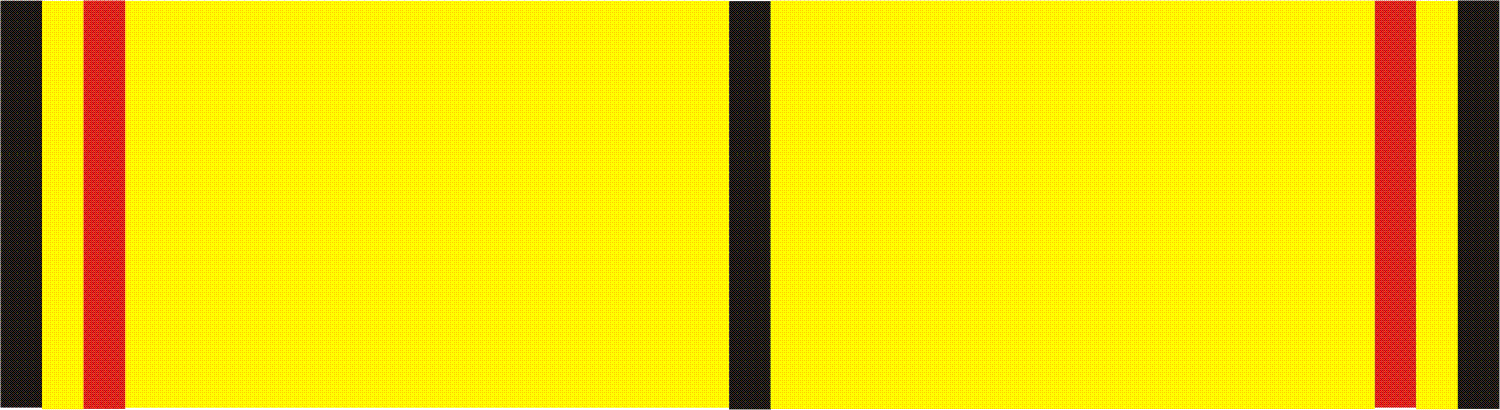

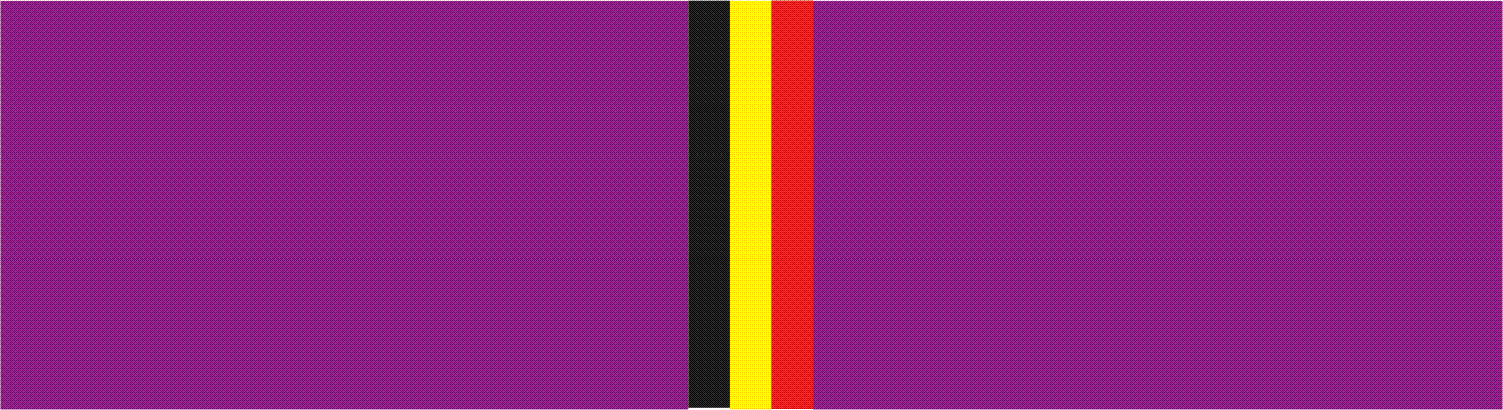

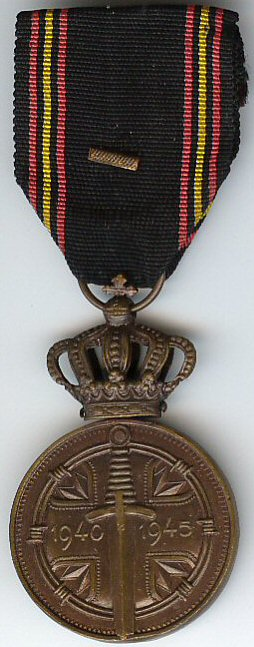
Prisoner of war medal '40-'45

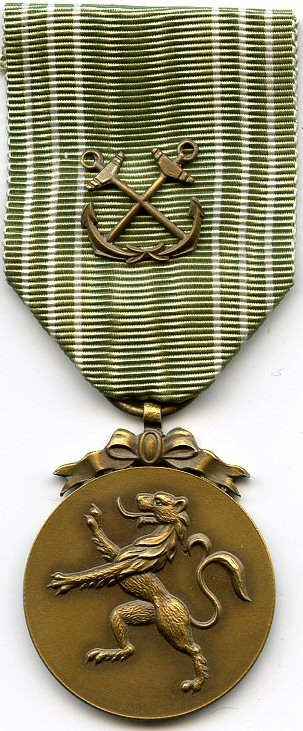
Maritime medal

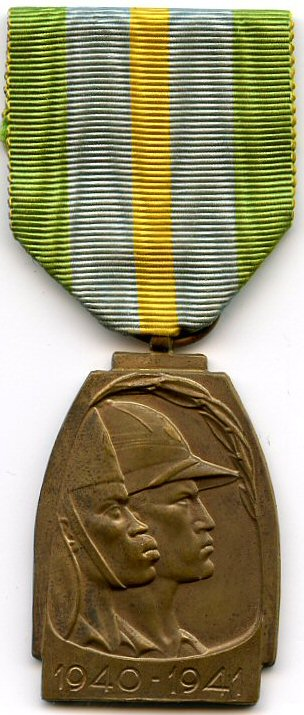
Commemorative medal of the Ethiopian campaign '40-'41

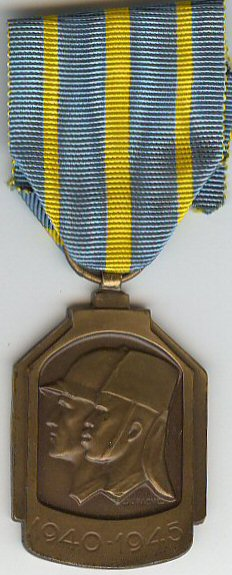
African war medal '40-'45

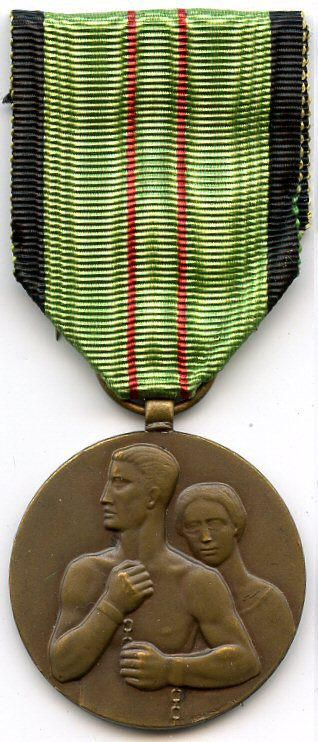
Civilian resistance medal

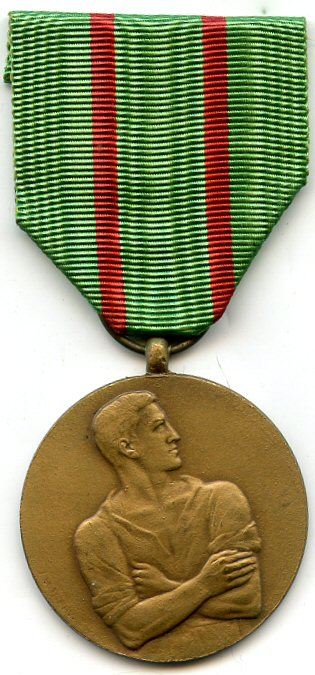
Civilian disobedience medal

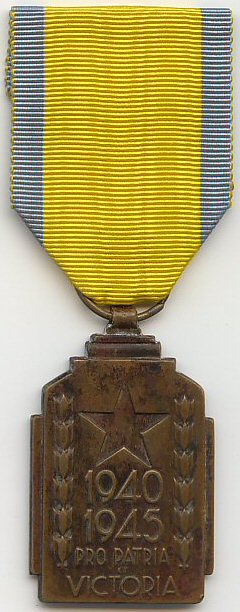
Colonial war effort medal '40–'45

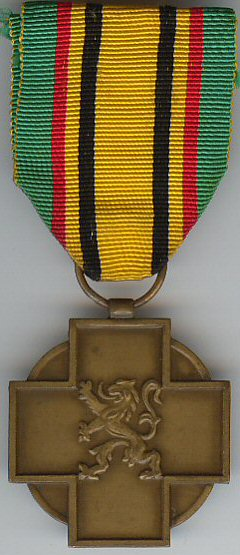
Military combatant medal '40-'45

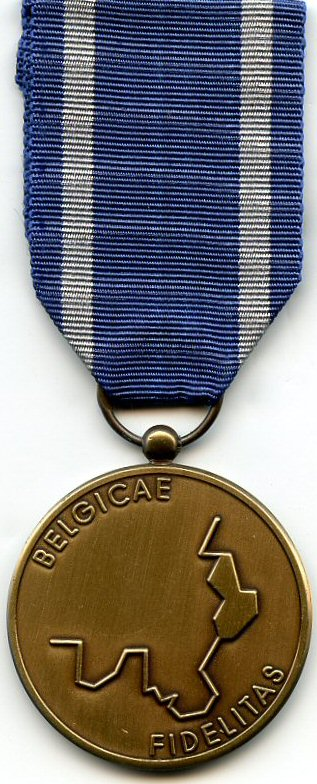
Medal for resistance against nazism in the annexed territories

World War II Recruiting centres medal

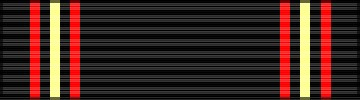

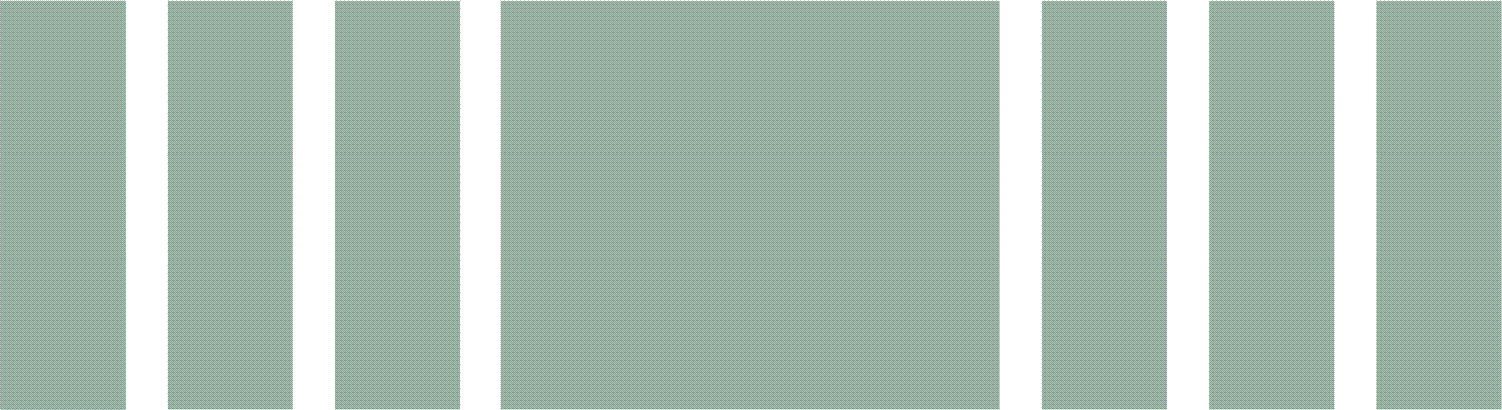

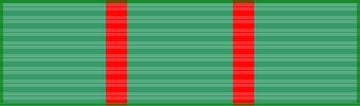

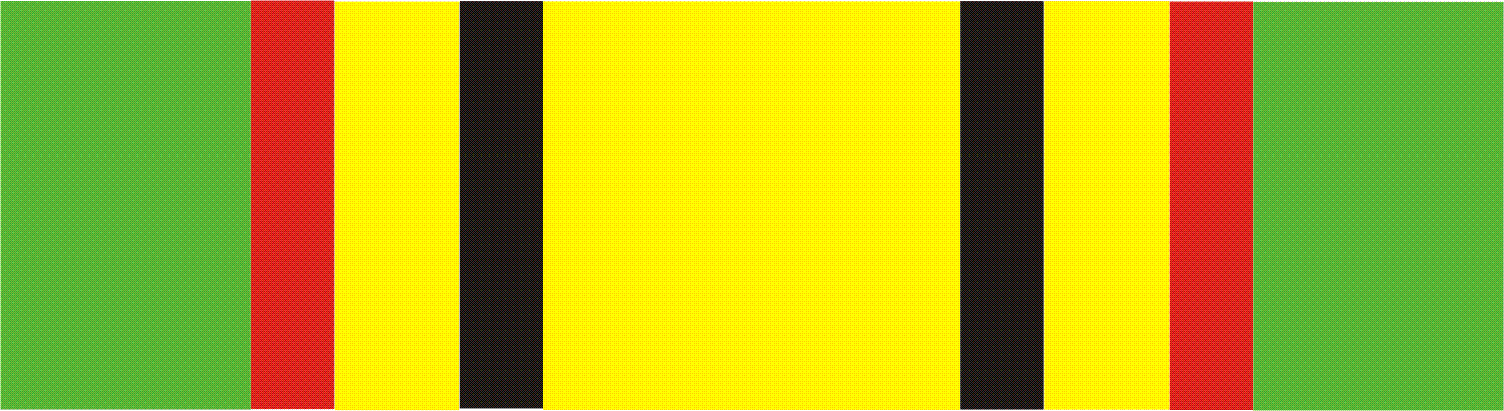

=== Other medals and awards ===
Awards and medals listed below are either obsolete or have never been awarded.

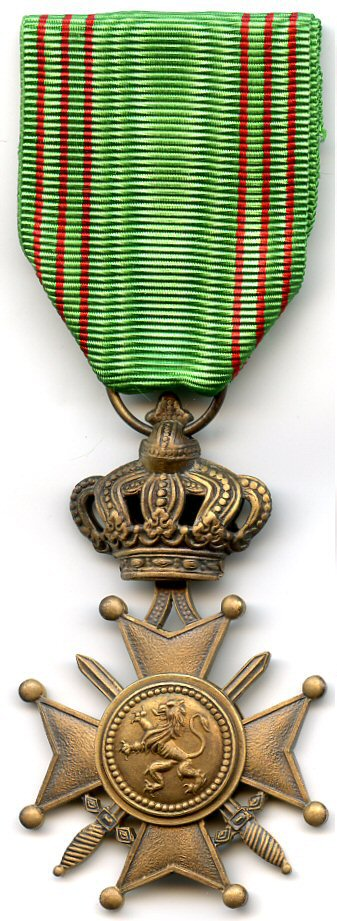
War cross

The service star

The meritorious service medal for native chiefs

The royal household medal

The native service medal

The Arab campaign medal

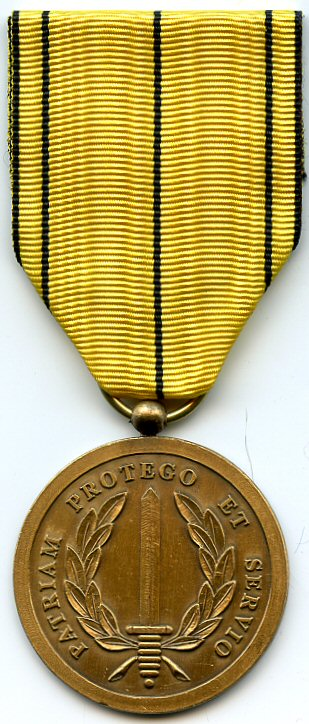
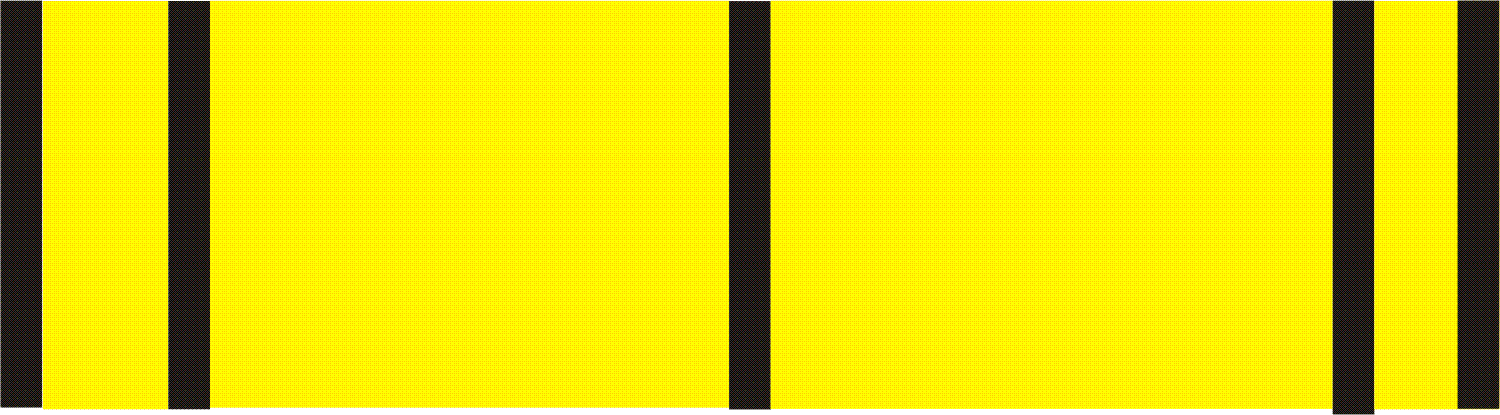
The medal for sports merit	The medal for family merit	The medal for agricultural and artisanal merit	The medal for services rendered

=== Commemorative medals ===
Commemorative medal of the visit to Brazil

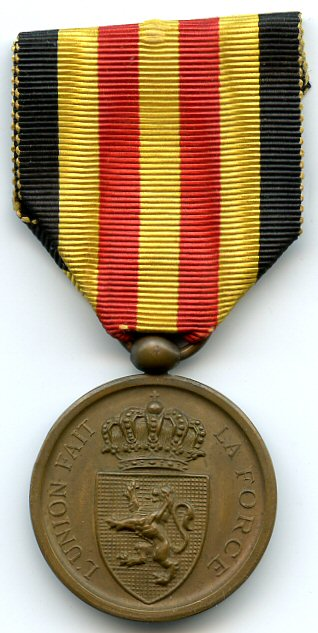
Commemorative medal 1870-1871

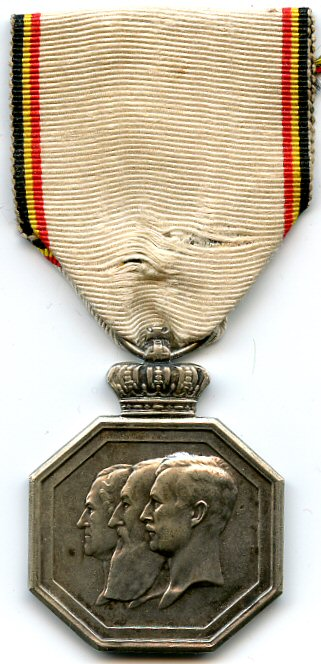
Commemorative medal of the 100 anniversary of the national independence

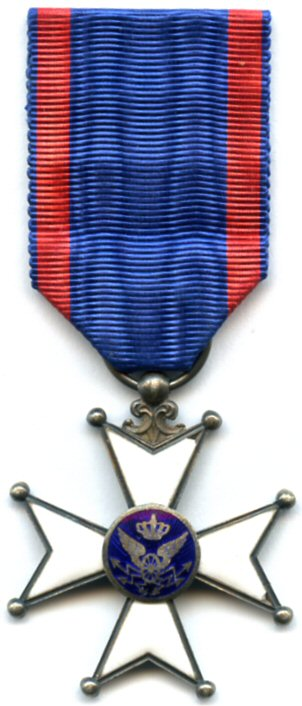
Commemorative Decoration of the 50th Anniversary of the creation of the railroads

Commemorative medal of the reign of King Leopold I

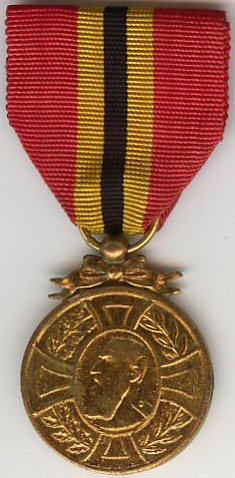
Commemorative medal of the reign of King Leopold II

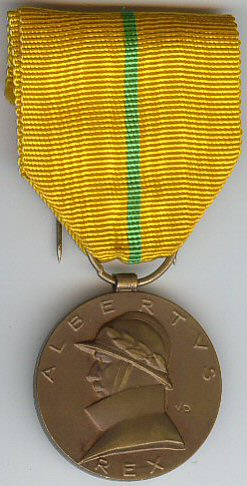
Commemorative medal of the reign of King Albert I

Commemorative decoration for the 50th anniversary of the Ostend-Dover Line

Commemorative medal of the VIIth olympics

Commemorative medal for the 75th anniversary of the telegraph service

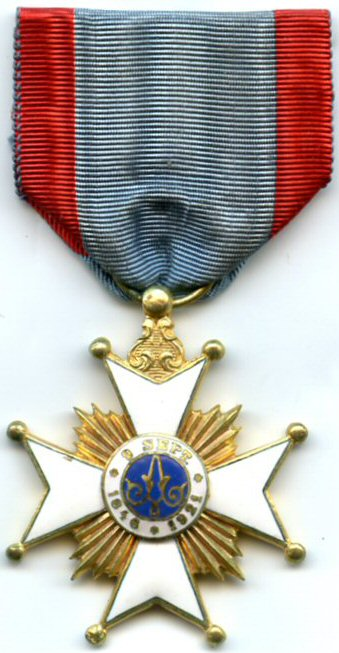

Commemorative medal for the 100th anniversary of the telegraph service

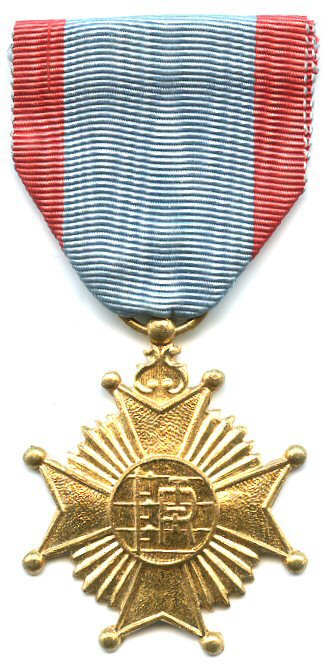

Commemorative medal for the 75th anniversary of the Belgian postal services

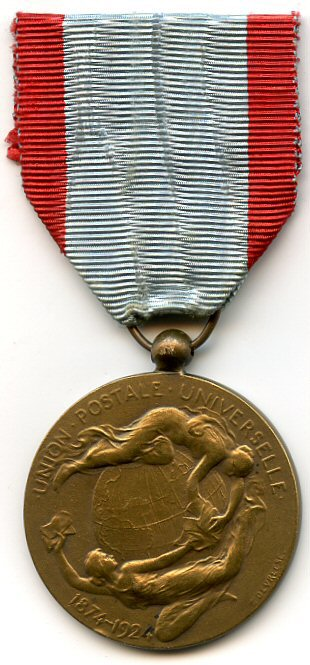

Commemorative medal for the 100th anniversary of the Belgian postal services

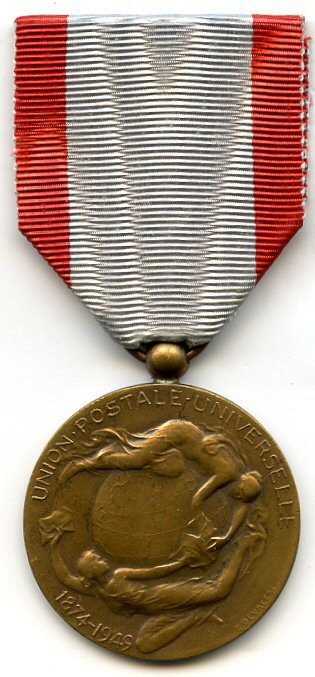

Commemorative medal for Congo

Commemorative cross of the House of King Albert

Commemorative decoration for the 50th anniversary of the Royal donation fund

Medal for the 50th anniversary of Belgian Congo

== Belgian Red Cross ==
Order of the Belgian red cross
Blood donor's medal
Cross of honour of the Belgian red cross '40-'45
Red cross decoration '40-'45
Commemorative medal 22 March Red Cross Flemish Brabant

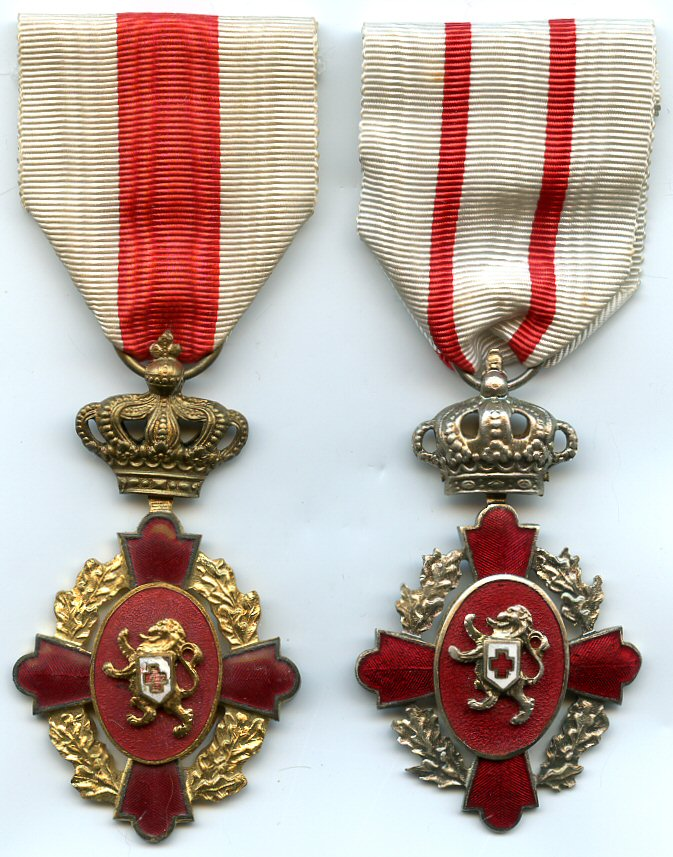

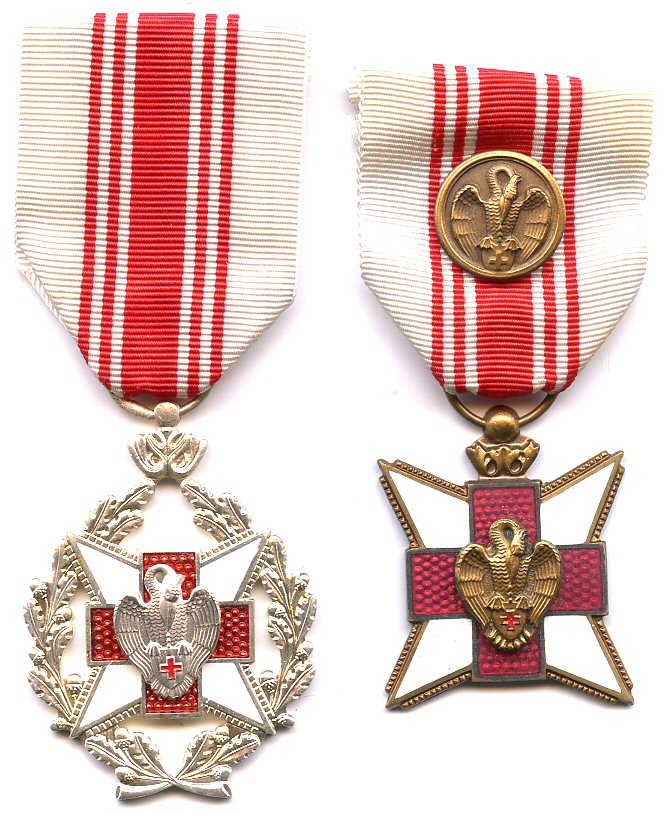

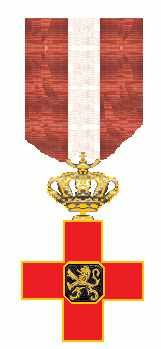

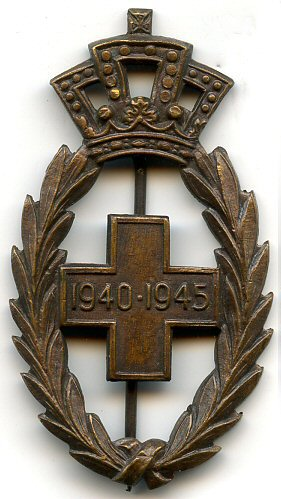
