= Commemorative Decoration of the 50th Anniversary of the Creation of the Railroads =

Commemorative Decoration of the 50th Anniversary of the Creation of the Railroads 1834-1884
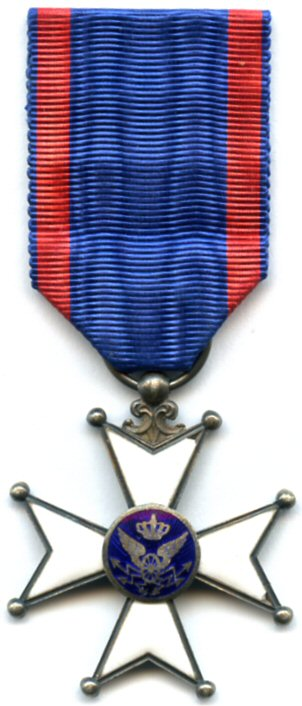
- Commemorative Decoration of the 50th Anniversary of the Creation of the Railroads (obverse)
- Type: Commemorative medal
- Awarded for: 25 years of good and loyal service prior to 30 April 1884
- Presented by: Kingdom of Belgium
- Eligibility: Belgian citizens
- Status: No longer awarded
- Established: 1 May 1884

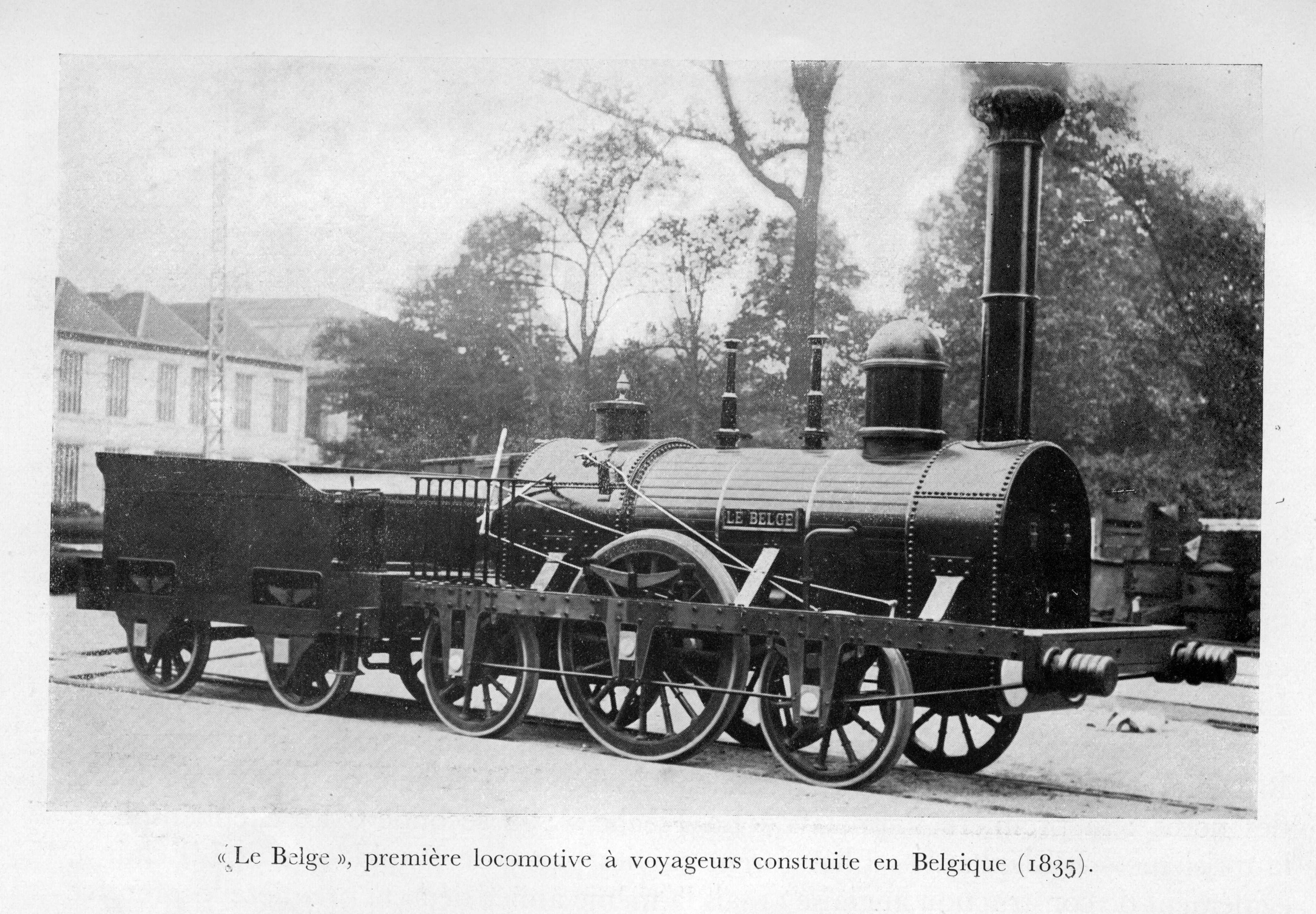
The first Belgian made locomotive in 1835 "Le Belge"

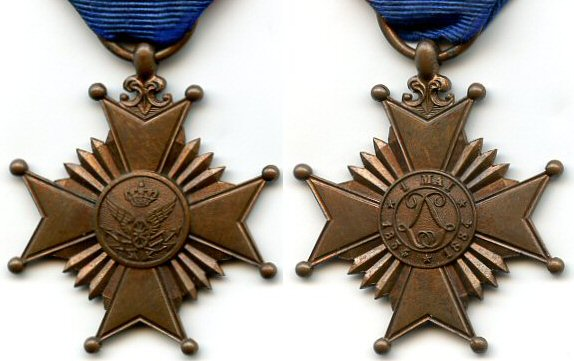
Obverse (left) and reverse (right) of the medal

The Commemorative Decoration of the 50th Anniversary of the Creation of the Railroads 1834-1884 (French: Décoration Commémorative du 50ème Anniversaire de la Création des Chemins de Fer 1834-1884, Dutch: Commemorative Decoratie van de 50e Verjaardag van de Schepping van de Spoorwegen 1834-1884) was a Belgian commemorative award denoting the 50th anniversary of the law of 1 May 1834 ordering the creation of railroads in Belgium. It was established by royal decree of King Leopold II on 30 April 1884 at the suggestion of the ministers of Public Works and of the Interior, its statute was ratified by a further royal decree on 11 July 1884.

== Award statute ==
The Commemorative Decoration of the 50th Anniversary of the Creation of the Railroads was awarded to civil servants, employees and agents commissioned by the Public Works or Interior departments who, while so employed, as of 1 May 1884, had a minimum of twenty-five years of good and loyal service and cooperated in the construction or exploitation of the state railways.

Following a proposition by the ministers of the Railways, of the Post and Telegraph, of Agriculture, of Industry and of Public Works, the statute was amended by royal decree on 11 July 1884 to include as potential recipients, in line with the award conditions stated in the previous decree dated 30 April 1884, civil servants and employees ceded to the State Railways, as well as retired civil servants, employees and commissioned agents.

== Award description ==
The Commemorative Decoration of the 50th Anniversary of the Creation of the Railroads was a white enamelled Maltese Cross with a slightly convex dark blue enamelled central medallion. The cross was outlined in gold and small gilt orbs were affixed to the eight tips of the cross arms. The obverse of the central medallion bore the gilt emblem of the railways of the time, a winged wheel over six arrows pointing in different directions, all under the royal crown of Belgium. Its reverse bore the gilt monogram of King Leopold II on a white enamelled background encircled by a dark blue enamelled ring bearing the gilt dates "1 MAI" (1 MAY) at the top, "1834" at lower left and "1884" at lower right, three small gilt five pointed stars separating the three inscriptions.

The decoration was suspended by a ring passing laterally through a ball shaped suspension mounted atop the decoration with an ornate base, from a blue silk moiré ribbon with red longitudinal stripes 2mm from each edge.

== Notable recipients (partial list) ==
The individuals listed below were awarded the Commemorative Decoration of the 50th Anniversary of the Creation of the Railroads:

- State Minister Jules Le Jeune

== Medal ==
A medal was also created aimed at rewarding the working class personnel of the state railroads. It was of the same basic design as the decoration except with rays extending outwards between the cross arms, being struck from bronze and being devoid of any enamels. It was awarded to workers of the Belgian railroads, both active and retired who, as of 1 May 1884, had cooperated to the construction or exploitation of the state railways for a minimum of 25 years of good and loyal services.

== See also ==
- History of rail transport in Belgium
- Rail transport in Belgium
- Orders, decorations, and medals of Belgium

== Other sources ==
- Quinot, H. (1950). Recueil illustré des décorations belges et congolaises, 4e Edition. Hasselt.
- Cornet, R. (1982). Recueil des dispositions légales et réglementaires régissant les ordres nationaux belges. 2e Ed. N.pl. Brussels.
- Borné, A.C. (1985). Distinctions honorifiques de la Belgique, 1830-1985. Brussels.
