= 1830 Volunteers' Commemorative Cross =

Belgian war medal

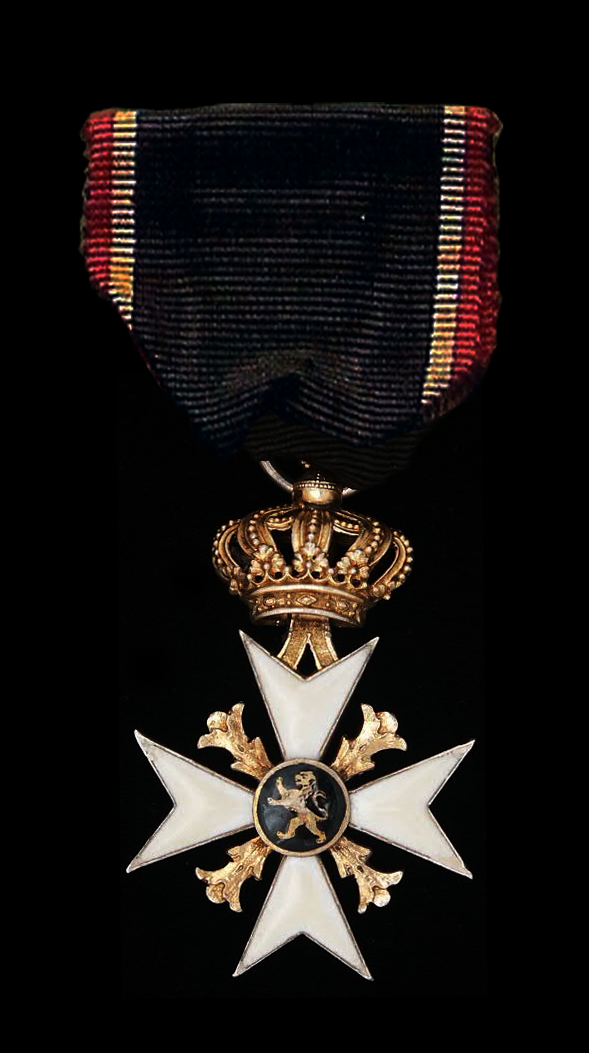
- 1830 Volunteers' Commemorative Cross (obverse)
- Type: War medal
- Awarded for: Voluntary military service during the Belgian Revolution
- Presented by: Kingdom of Belgium
- Eligibility: Belgian citizens
- Status: No longer awarded
- Established: 20 April 1878
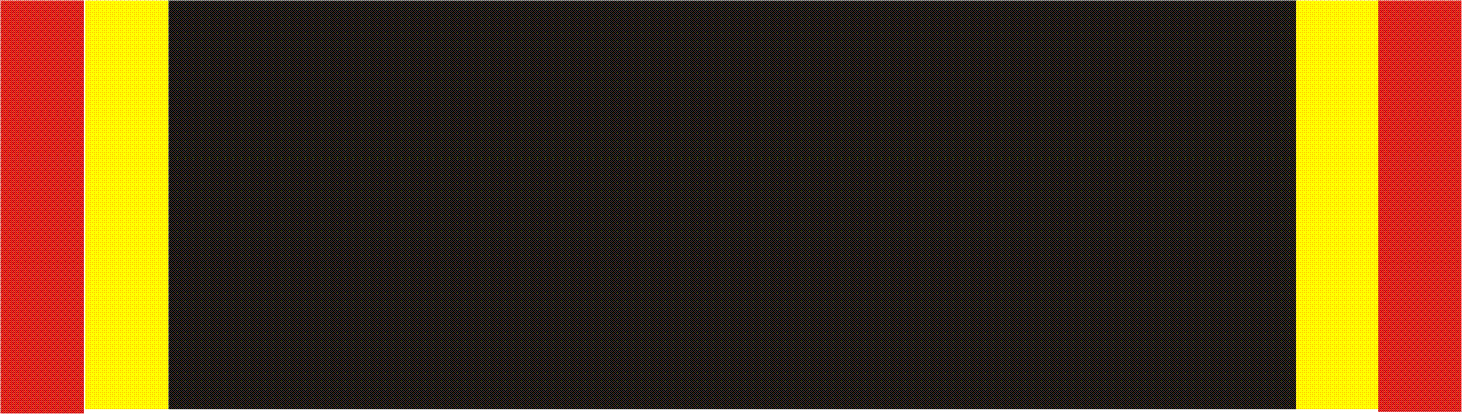

In 1833, following the end of the Belgian Revolution, the young kingdom of Belgium created the Iron Cross to recognise wounds received and bravery in battle. The award first class was bestowed to the wounded who elected to stay at their post and keep fighting, to the maimed and mutilated, as well as for acts of courage, the award second class was bestowed to all wounded combatants. In 1835, due to the discontent of most recipients, the award 2nd class was terminated and all received the first class. Over the years, recipients of the Iron Cross received ever increasing pensions, up to ten years of seniority when employed as civil servants and pensions for the widows and orphans of the deceased. The other combatants of 1830-1831 received no pension, and no commemorative medal was struck.

These forgotten veterans' discontent grew over the years to the point of forming the "Federation of Volunteer Combatants of 1830" which openly and actively lobbied for recognition of their combat actions. It was not until over forty years later, in 1878, that King Leopold II signed the decree creating the 1830 Volunteers' Commemorative Cross.

== Award statute ==
The 1830 Volunteers' Commemorative Cross (French: Croix Commémorative des Volontaires de 1830, Dutch: Herinneringskruis voor de Vrijwilligers van 1830) was a Belgian campaign medal established by royal decree on 20 April 1878 and awarded to all members of the Belgian Army and popular militias who served during the 1830-1831 Belgian Revolution who had not been awarded the Iron Cross.

== Award description ==
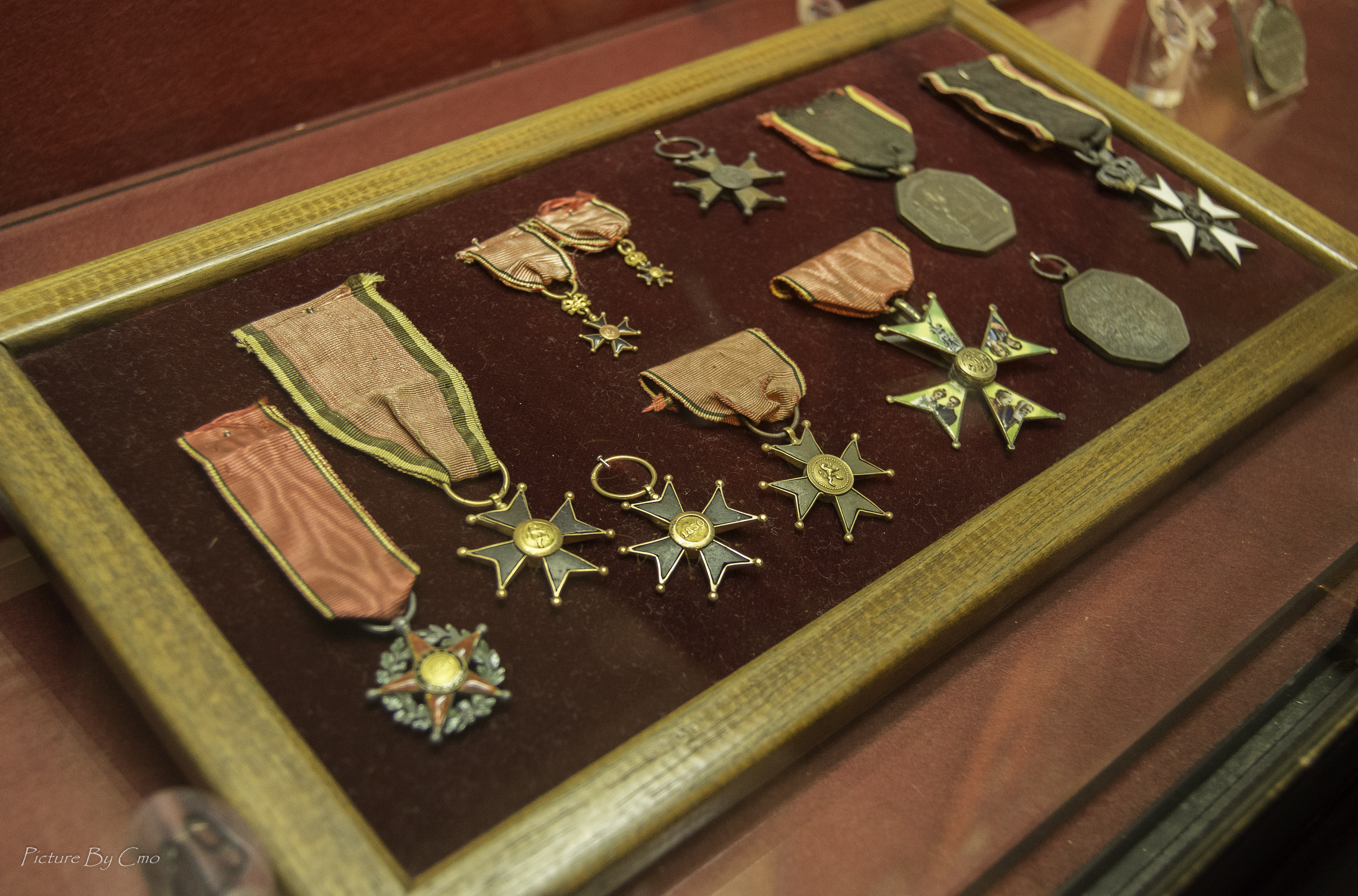
The volunteer Cross, Collection Royal Museum of the Armed Forces, Brussels

The 1830 Volunteers' Commemorative Cross was a white enamelled Maltese Cross with a gilt Burgundy Cross between its arms and a black enamelled central medallion, two arms converged upwards from between the tips of the upper cross arm to a pivot mounted royal crown. The black enamelled central medallion bore on the obverse the Belgian lion, an heraldic "lion rampant", the reverse bore the year "1830".

The cross was suspended by a ring through a lateral hole in the royal crown's orb from a silk moiré ribbon in the national colours of Belgium. The ribbon was black with narrow 2mm red edge stripes bordered by 2mm yellow stripes on the inside.

Obverse	Reverse

== Notable recipients (partial list) ==
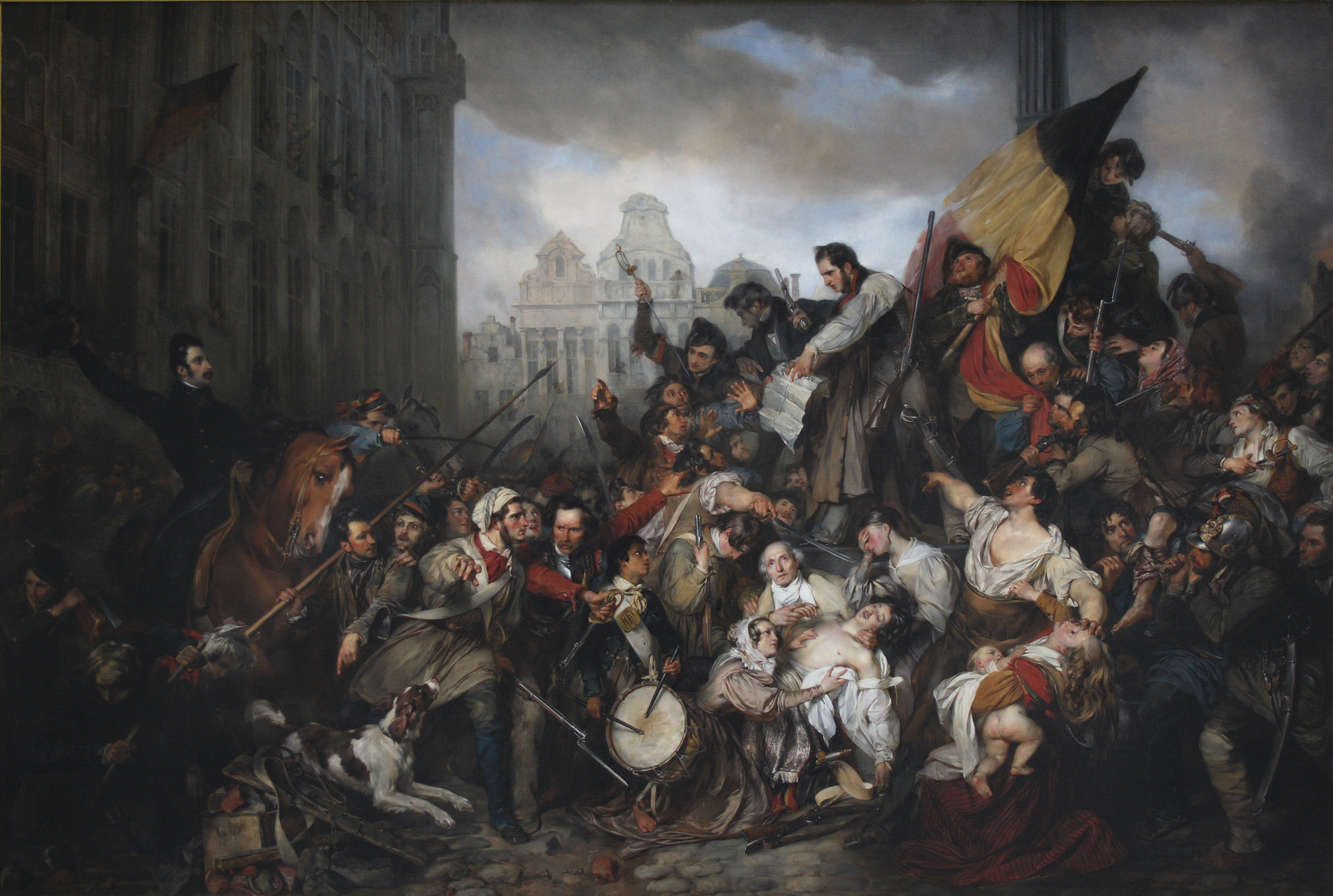
Episode of the September Days 1830 (on the Grand Place of Brussels)

- Major General Nicolas François Edouard Brialmont
- Cavalry Lieutenant General Narcisse Auguste Ablaÿ de Perceval

== See also ==
- Orders, decorations, and medals of Belgium

== Other sources ==
- Quinot H., 1950, Recueil illustré des décorations belges et congolaises, 4e Edition. (Hasselt)
- Cornet R., 1982, Recueil des dispositions légales et réglementaires régissant les ordres nationaux belges. 2e Ed. N.pl., (Brussels)
- Borné A.C., 1985, Distinctions honorifiques de la Belgique, 1830-1985 (Brussels)
