= Escapees' Cross 1940–1945 =

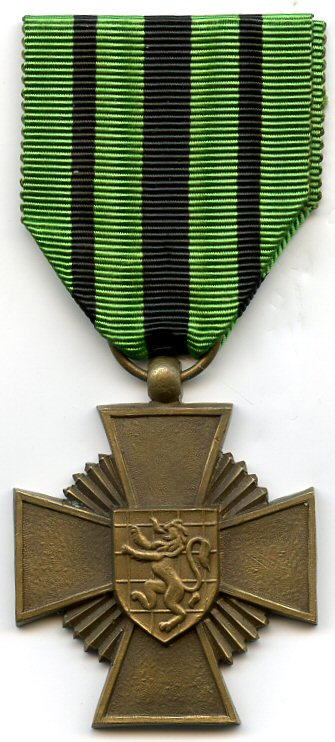
- Escapees' Cross 1940–1945 (obverse)
- Type: War medal
- Awarded for: Combat service following an escape from enemy imprisonment or territory
- Presented by: Kingdom of Belgium
- Eligibility: Belgian citizens
- Status: No longer awarded
- Established: 25 February 1944

The Escapees' Cross 1940–1945 (French: Croix des Évadés 1940–1945, Dutch: Kruis der Ontsnapten 1940–1945) was a Belgian war service medal established on 25 February 1944 by the Belgian government in exile in London. It was awarded to all Belgian citizens who, during World War II, escaped from occupied Belgium, from another occupied land or from Germany and that, following said escape, had proven their patriotism by joining and serving with a resistance group, or had been imprisoned for a minimum of three months following an act of patriotism, or for having travelled clandestinely to participate in a Belgian action aimed at promoting the war against the enemy. Escaped prisoners of war could also be awarded the medal if they met this last criteria.

The medal's statute was later amended to include those who had escaped, even from non occupied territories, and made their way to the United Kingdom in order to continue fighting the enemy. This included the Belgians rescued between 28 May and 2 June 1940 from the beaches of Dunkirk, it also included those who escaped, prior to 1 November 1940, from non occupied France or French North Africa.

== Award description ==
The Escapees' Cross 1940–1945 was a 39mm wide cross pattée with four 7mm long rays radiating outwards between its arms. Its obverse bore a 14mm wide by 18mm high shield bearing a "lion rampant" superimposed over prison bars. The medal was single face, its reverse was bare.

The Escapees' Cross 1940–1945 was suspended by a ring through a suspension loop from a 37mm wide green silk moiré ribbon with a longitudinal 6mm wide central black stripe and narrow 3mm black stripes 6mm from the ribbon edges.

== Notable recipients (partial list) ==
The individuals listed below were awarded the Escapees' Cross 1940–1945:

- Lieutenant General Roger Dewandre
- Lieutenant General Jean-Baptiste Piron
- Major General Baron Georges Danloy
- Baron Charles Poswick
- Baron Gilbert Thibaut de Maisières
- Walter Ganshof van der Meersch
- Charles Poswick

== See also ==
- Orders, decorations, and medals of Belgium

== Other sources ==
- Quinot H., 1950, Recueil illustré des décorations belges et congolaises, 4e Edition. (Hasselt)
- Cornet R., 1982, Recueil des dispositions légales et réglementaires régissant les ordres nationaux belges. 2e Ed. N.pl., (Brussels)
- Borné A.C., 1985, Distinctions honorifiques de la Belgique, 1830–1985 (Brussels)
