= Deportees' Cross 1914–1918 =

Former Belgian war medal

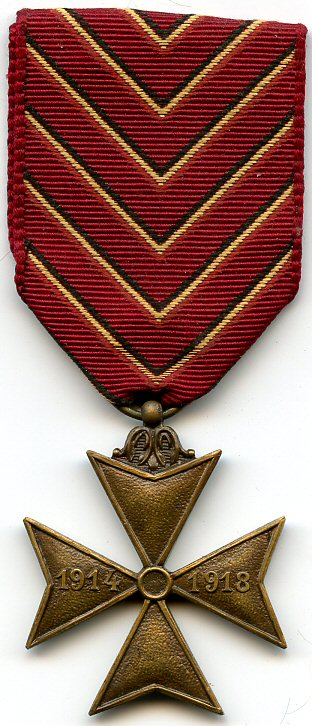
- Deportees' Cross 1914–1918 (obverse)
- Type: War medal
- Awarded for: Deportation to Germany for forced labour
- Presented by: Kingdom of Belgium
- Eligibility: Belgian citizens
- Status: No longer awarded
- Established: 27 November 1922

Highlights
- Total: ~55,000

The Deportees' Cross 1914–1918 (French: Croix des Déportés 1914–1918) (Dutch: Weggevoerdenkruis 1914–1918) was a Belgian war medal established on 27 November 1922 by royal decree and awarded to Belgian citizens deported to Germany for forced labour during the First World War.

Deportees who died during their deportation were not awarded this cross, instead, they received the Order of Leopold II with the ribbon bearing a central longitudinal gold stripe.

== Award description ==
The Deportees' Cross 1914–1918 is a 38mm wide bronze cross pattée with identical obverse and reverse. The horizontal arms bear the relief inscription "1914" on the right arm and "1918" on the left arm.

The cross is suspended by a ring through a suspension loop from a 37mm wide dark red silk moiré ribbon adorned with 3mm chevrons in the national colours of Belgium.

== See also ==
- Orders, decorations, and medals of Belgium

== Other sources ==
- Quinot H., 1950, Recueil illustré des décorations belges et congolaises, 4e Edition. (Hasselt)
- Cornet R., 1982, Recueil des dispositions légales et réglementaires régissant les ordres nationaux belges. 2e Ed. N.pl., (Brussels)
- Borné A.C., 1985, Distinctions honorifiques de la Belgique, 1830–1985 (Brussels)
