= 1940–1945 Military Combatant's Medal =

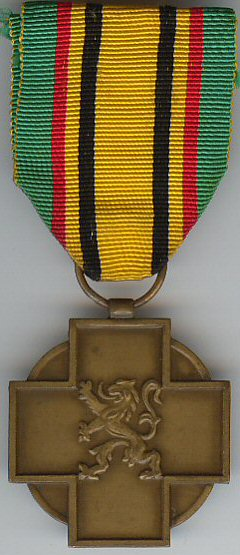
- 1940–1945 Military Combatant's Medal (obverse)
- Type: War medal
- Awarded for: Combat duty during the Second World War
- Presented by: Kingdom of Belgium
- Eligibility: Belgian citizens
- Status: No longer awarded
- Established: 19 December 1967
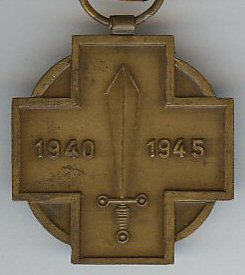
- Reverse

The 1940–1945 Military Combatant's Medal (French: Médaille du Combattant Militaire de la Guerre 1940–1945, Dutch: "Medaille van de Militaire Strijder 1940–1945") was a Belgian war medal established by royal decree on 19 December 1967 and awarded to all members of the Belgian Armed Forces who fought from the United Kingdom during the Second World War.

== Award description ==
The 1940–1945 Military Combatant's Medal is a 38mm wide bronze Greek cross with semi-circular protrusions filling the gaps between the arms up to 3mm from the cross arms' ends. The obverse bears the relief image of a "lion rampant" at the centre of the cross. The reverse bears a vertical broadsword bisecting the years "1940" and "1945" inscribed in relief.

The medal is suspended by a ring through a suspension loop from a 36mm wide silk moiré ribbon. The colours of the ribbon are divided as follows from the left to the right edge: 6mm green, 2mm red, 3mm yellow, 2mm black, 1 cm yellow, 2mm black, 3mm yellow, 2mm red, 6mm green.

== Notable recipients (partial list) ==
The individuals listed below were awarded the 1940–1945 Military Combatant's Medal:

- Lieutenant General Roger Dewandre
- Lieutenant General Ernest Engelen
- Lieutenant General Sir Louis Teysen
- Lieutenant General Constant Weyns
- Police Lieutenant General August Van Wanzeele
- Aviator Lieutenant General Armand Crekillie
- Aviator Vice Admiral Sir André Schlim
- Cavalry Major General Jules François Gaston Everaert
- François Ernest Samray

== See also ==
- Orders, decorations, and medals of Belgium

== Other sources ==
- Quinot H., 1950, Recueil illustré des décorations belges et congolaises, 4e Edition. (Hasselt)
- Cornet R., 1982, Recueil des dispositions légales et réglementaires régissant les ordres nationaux belges. 2e Ed. N.pl., (Brussels)
- Borné A.C., 1985, Distinctions honorifiques de la Belgique, 1830–1985 (Brussels)
