= Cross of Honour for Military Service Abroad =

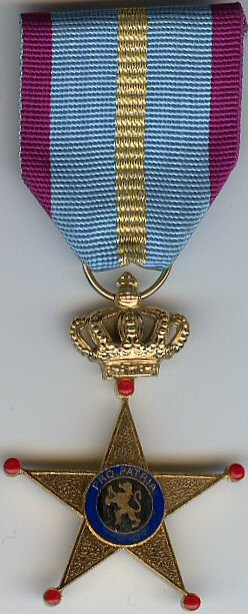
- Cross of Honour for Military Service Abroad (obverse)
- Type: Cross
- Awarded for: Foreign service
- Presented by: Kingdom of Belgium
- Eligibility: Military personnel of the Belgian Armed Forces
- Status: Active
- Established: 16 June 1997
- First class ribbon bar Second class ribbon bar Third class ribbon bar

Precedence
- Next (higher): Military Decoration for Long Service
- Next (lower): Commemorative Medal for Armed Humanitarian Operations

The Cross of Honour for Military Service Abroad (Dutch: Erekruis voor Militaire Dienst in het Buitenland, French: Croix d'Honneur pour Service Militaire à l'Étranger) is a Belgian military decoration originally established for award to Belgian servicemen who served for a long period of time in the Federal Republic of Germany, Zaire (now Congo), Rwanda or Burundi. It was established on 16 June 1997 in three classes.

== Classes and award prerequisites ==
The Cross of Honour is awarded in three classes based on the duration of service in the relevant territory. Years of service do not have to be continuous:

- The First Class is awarded for 15 years of service
- The Second Class for 10 years of service
- The Third Class for 5 years of service

However, depending on the region where the services were performed, one year of actual service may count for more than one year for the purpose of awarding the Cross of Honour. One year of service in the Congo, Rwanda or Burundi counted as five years, one year of service at the border between the former West Germany and the former East Germany counted for three years, and one year of service performed in the central region of the former West Germany counted for two years.

== Insignia ==
The medal is a gold star with a red pearl at each tip. The star is suspended to the ribbon by a royal crown and a ring. The obverse bears a central medallion with a golden lion on a black enamelled background surrounded by a ring of blue enamel with the motto in gold letters Pro Patria. The reverse medallion bears a crown of laurels surrounding two crossed swords.

The ribbon is azure blue with a purple vertical border on each side and in the centre a vertical stripe the colour of which depends on the class: gold for first class, silver for second class, and red for third class.

First Class Obverse	Second Class Obverse	Third Class Obverse	Third Class Reverse

== See also ==
- Orders, decorations, and medals of Belgium

== Other sources ==
- Quinot H., 1950, Recueil illustré des décorations belges et congolaises, 4e Edition. (Hasselt)
- Cornet R., 1982, Recueil des dispositions légales et réglementaires régissant les ordres nationaux belges. 2e Ed. N.pl., (Brussels)
- Borné A.C., 1985, Distinctions honorifiques de la Belgique, 1830-1985 (Brussels)
