= Civilian Disobedience Medal =

War service medal of the Kingdom of Belgium

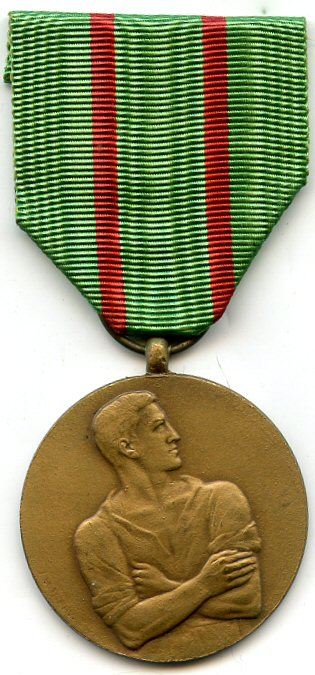
- Civilian Disobedience Medal(obverse)
- Type: War medal
- Awarded for: Refusal to help the German war effort during World War 2
- Presented by: Kingdom of Belgium
- Eligibility: Belgian citizens
- Status: No longer awarded
- Established: 12 February 1951
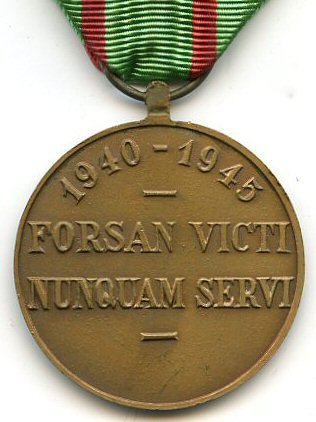
- Reverse of the Civilian Disobedience Medal

The Civilian Disobedience Medal (French: Médaille du Réfractaire, Dutch: Werkweigeraarsmedaille) was a war service medal of the Kingdom of Belgium established by royal decree on 12 February 1951 and awarded to Belgian citizens refusing to support the German war effort during the Second World War.

== Award description ==
The Civilian Disobedience Medal was a circular 37mm in diameter bronze medal. Its obverse bore the relief torso of a civilian male with his arms crossed and his face turned away to the right in defiance. The reverse bore the relief inscription on two lines in Latin "FORSAN VICTI NUNQUAM SERVI" roughly translating into "MAYBE DEFEATED BUT NEVER SLAVES". The years "1940-1945" are inscribed along the reverse's upper circumference.

The medal was suspended by a ring through a suspension loop to a 38mm wide silk moiré green ribbon with two 3mm wide longitudinal stripes located 1cm from the edges, the stripes came in three different colours depending on the reason for bestowal:

- yellow stripes indicated refusal to serve in the German armed forces;
- white stripes indicated refusal to work for the Germans;
- red stripes indicated refusal to return to Germany by a forced labourer following leave at home in Belgium.

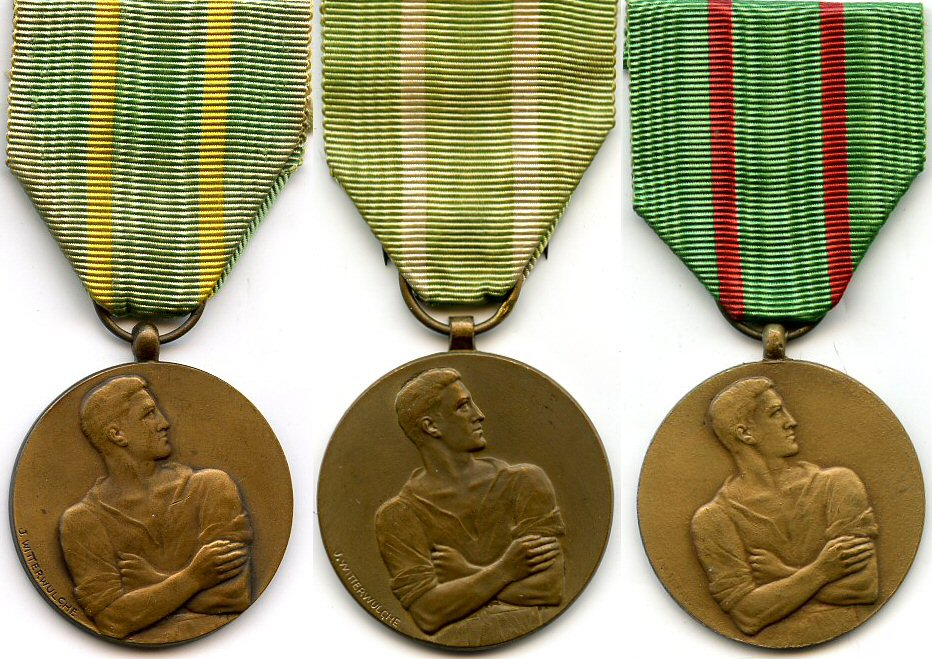

== Other sources ==
- Quinot H., 1950, Recueil illustré des décorations belges et congolaises, 4e Edition. (Hasselt)
- Cornet R., 1982, Recueil des dispositions légales et réglementaires régissant les ordres nationaux belges. 2e Ed. N.pl., (Brussels)
- Borné A.C., 1985, Distinctions honorifiques de la Belgique, 1830-1985 (Brussels)

== See also ==
- Orders, decorations, and medals of Belgium
