= Civilian Resistance Medal =

War service medal of the Kingdom of Belgium

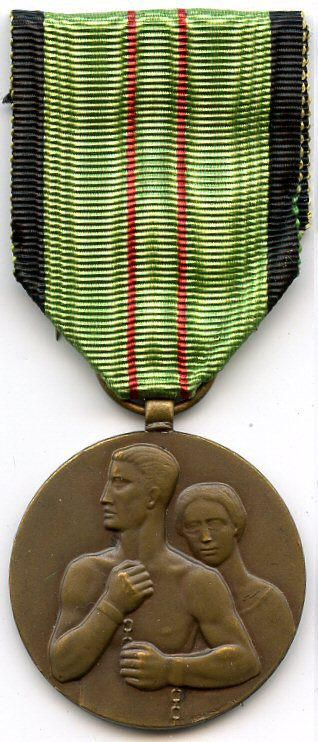
- Civilian Resistance Medal (obverse)
- Type: War medal
- Awarded for: Service in the civilian resistance during World War 2
- Presented by: Kingdom of Belgium
- Eligibility: Belgian citizens
- Status: No longer awarded
- Established: 21 March 1951
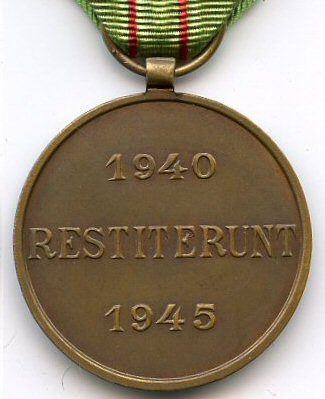
- Reverse of the Civilian Resistance Medal

The Civilian Resistance Medal (French: Médaille du résistant civil, Dutch: Burgerlijke Weerstandsmedaille) was a war service medal of the Kingdom of Belgium established by royal decree on 21 March 1951 and awarded to all members of the Belgian civilian resistance during the Second World War who were recognised as such by the law of 24 September 1946.

== Award description ==
The Civilian Resistance Medal is a circular 39mm in diameter bronze medal. Its obverse bears the relief image of the torso of a man breaking free of chains around his wrists, a woman stands behind him and slightly to his left. The reverse bears the relief inscription in Latin "RESTITERUNT" meaning "THEY RESISTED" with the years "1940" above and "1945" below. The reverse has a slightly raised border.

The medal is suspended by a ring through a suspension loop from a 37 mm wide light green silk moiré ribbon with two central 1 mm wide red stripes 5 mm apart and 4 mm black edge stripes. The colours of the ribbon are symbolic, the black denoting the dark days of the German occupation and/or the clandestine nature of the resistance, the green stands for the hope of liberation and the red for the spilled blood of the resistance members.

== Notable recipients (partial list) ==
- Baron Charles Poswick

== See also ==
- Resistance during World War II
- Resistance movement
- Orders, decorations, and medals of Belgium

== Other sources ==
- Quinot H., 1950, Recueil illustré des décorations belges et congolaises, 4e Edition. (Hasselt)
- Cornet R., 1982, Recueil des dispositions légales et réglementaires régissant les ordres nationaux belges. 2e Ed. N.pl., (Brussels)
- Borné A.C., 1985, Distinctions honorifiques de la Belgique, 1830–1985 (Brussels)
