= List of military awards and decorations of World War II =

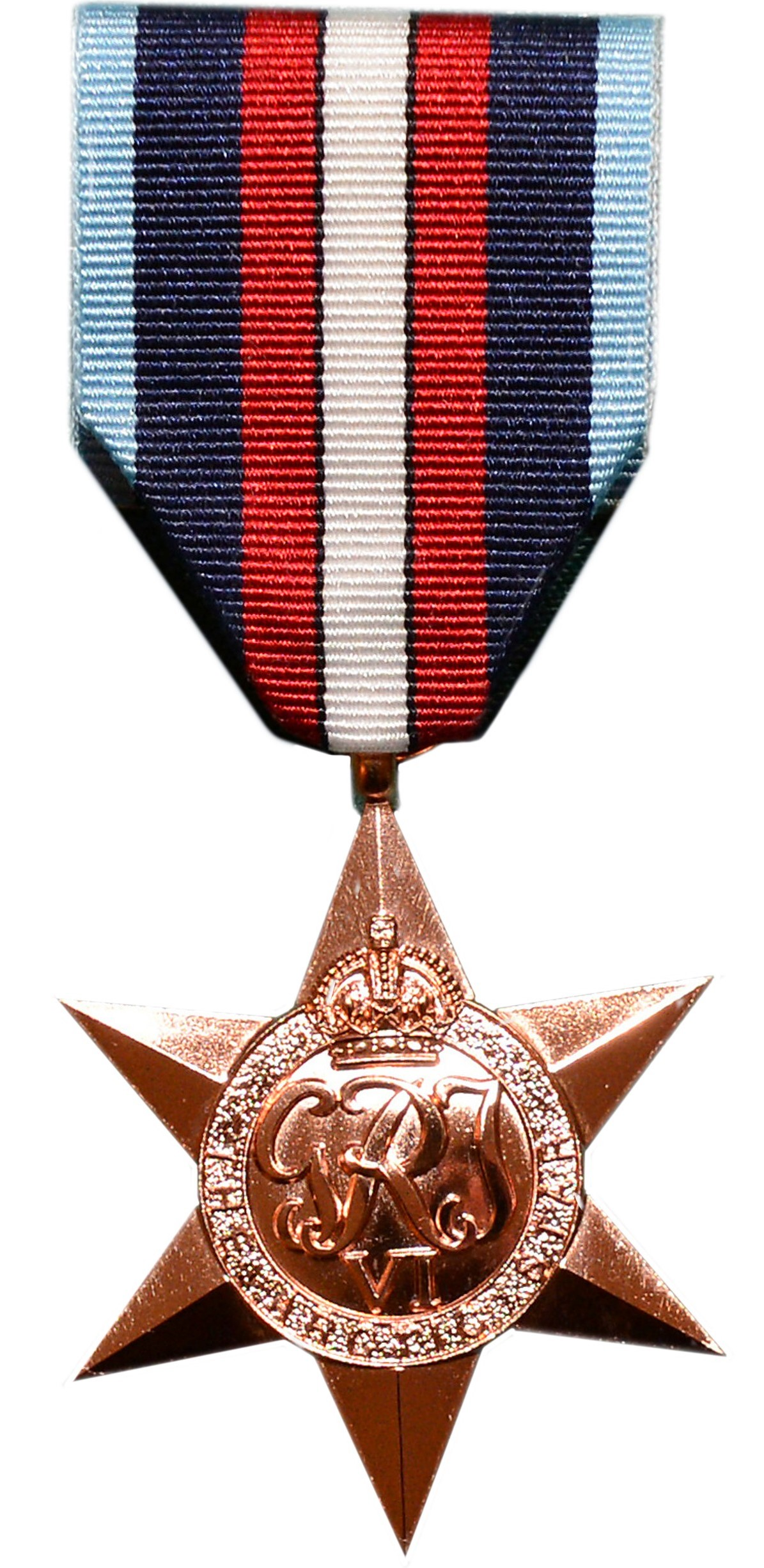
The Arctic Star medal recognises service between 1941 and 1945 delivering vital aid to the Soviet Union, running the gauntlet of enemy submarine, air and surface ship attacks.

This list of military awards and decorations of World War II is an index to articles on notable military awards presented by the combatants during World War II.

== Allied Powers ==
=== Australia ===
- Atlantic Star
- Air Crew Europe Star
- Arctic Star
- Africa Star
- Pacific Star
- Burma Star
- Italy Star
- France and Germany Star
- Defence Medal
- War Medal, 1939–45
- Australia Service Medal 1939–45

=== Belgium ===
- Croix de guerre
- Maritime Medal 1940–1945
- Medal of the Armed Resistance 1940–1945
- Political Prisoner's Cross 1940–1945
- Civilian Resistance Medal
- Prisoner of War Medal 1940–1945
- 1940–1945 Military Combatant's Medal
- Volunteer's Medal 1940–1945
- 1940–1945 African War Medal
- 1940–1945 Colonial War Effort Medal
- Fourragère

=== France ===
- Croix du combattant
- Croix du combattant volontaire
- Croix de Guerre 1939–1945
- Fourragère
- Légion d'honneur à titre militaire
- Médaille commémorative de la guerre 1939–1945
- Médaille de la France libérée
- Médaille militaire
- Médaille de la Résistance
- Ordre de la Libération

=== Greece ===
- Cross of Valour
- War Cross
- Medal of Military Merit

=== Kingdom of Italy (1943–1945) ===
- Commemorative Medal of the War of Liberation

=== Luxembourg ===
- Military Medal
- Luxembourg War Cross
- Order of the Resistance

=== Netherlands ===
- Military Order of William
- Dutch Cross of Resistance
- Bronze Lion
- Resistance Star East Asia
- Bronze Cross
- Cross of Merit
- Airman's Cross
- Honorary Medal for Charitable Assistance

=== Poland ===
- Virtuti Militari
- Order Krzyża Grunwaldu
- Order Krzyża Niepodległości
- Krzyż Walecznych (Cross of the Valorous)
- Krzyż Zasługi z Mieczami (Cross of Merit with Swords)
- Medal Wojska (Army Medal for War 1939–45)
- Medal Lotniczy (Air Force Medal for War 1939–45)
- Medal Morski (Navy Medal for War 1939–45)
- Medal Morski Polskiej Marynarki Handlowej (Merchant Marine Medal for War 1939–45)
- Krzyż Kampanii Wrześniowej 1939 (Cross of September Campaign 1939)
- Krzyż Pamiątkowy Monte Cassino (Monte Cassino Commemorative Cross)
- Krzyż Armii Krajowej (Home Army Cross)
- Medal "Zasłużonym na Polu Chwały" (Medal for Merit on the Field of Glory)
- Krzyż Partyzancki (Partisan Cross)
- Krzyż Czynu Bojowego Polskich Sił Zbrojnych na Zachodzie (Polish Armed Forces in the West Military Action Cross)
- Krzyż Bitwy pod Lenino (Battle of Lenino Cross)
- Krzyż Oświęcimski (Auschwitz Cross)
- Medal "Za udział w wojnie obronnej 1939" (Medal for the War of 1939)
- Warszawski Krzyż Powstańczy (Warsaw Cross of the Uprising)
- Medal za Warszawę 1939–1945 (Medal for Warsaw 1939–1945)
- Medal za Odrę, Nysę, Bałtyk (Medal for Oder, Neisse and Baltic)
- Medal Zwycięstwa i Wolności 1945 (Medal of Victory and Freedom 1945)
- Medal "Za udział w walkach o Berlin" (Medal for Participation in the Battle of Berlin)
- Krzyż Batalionów Chłopskich (Peasant Battalions Cross)
- Krzyż Narodowego Czynu Zbrojnego (National Military Action Cross)
- Krzyż Zesłańców Sybiru (Cross of the Deported to Siberia)
- Krzyż Powstania Warszawskiego (Cross of the Warsaw Uprising)

=== Soviet Union ===
- Hero of the Soviet Union
- Order of the Red Banner
- Order of Lenin
- Order of Suvorov
- Order of Kutuzov
- Order of Ushakov
- Order of Nakhimov
- Order of Glory
- Order of Alexander Nevsky
- Order of the Patriotic War
- Order of the Red Star
- Medal "For the Victory over Germany in the Great Patriotic War 1941–1945"
- Medal "For the Victory over Japan"
- Medal "For the Defence of Leningrad"
- Medal "For the Defence of Odessa"
- Medal "For the Defence of Sevastopol"
- Medal "For the Defence of Stalingrad"
- Medal "For the Defence of Moscow"
- Medal "For the Defence of the Caucasus"
- Medal "For the Defence of the Soviet Transarctic"
- Medal "For the Defence of Kiev"
- Medal "For the Capture of Berlin"
- Medal "For the Capture of Vienna"
- Medal "For the Capture of Königsberg"
- Medal "For the Capture of Budapest"
- Medal "For the Liberation of Prague"
- Medal "For the Liberation of Warsaw"
- Medal "For the Liberation of Belgrade"

In the Soviet Union orders and medals were also awarded to cities, factories, ships and military units.

=== United Kingdom ===
- Victoria Cross
- George Cross
- Order of the Bath
- Order of the British Empire
- Distinguished Service Order
- Distinguished Service Cross
- Military Cross
- Distinguished Flying Cross
- Air Force Cross
- Distinguished Conduct Medal
- Conspicuous Gallantry Medal
- Distinguished Service Medal
- Military Medal
- Distinguished Flying Medal
- Air Force Medal
- Burma Gallantry Medal
- George Medal
- Mention in Despatches
- 1939–1945 Star
- Atlantic Star
- Air Crew Europe Star
- Africa Star
- Pacific Star
- Burma Star
- Italy Star
- France and Germany Star
- Defence Medal
- War Medal 1939–1945

=== United States ===
- Medal of Honor
- Navy Cross
- Distinguished Service Cross
- Distinguished Service Medal
- Navy Distinguished Service Medal
- Legion of Merit
- Silver Star
- Bronze Star
- Soldier's Medal
- Navy and Marine Corps Medal
- Purple Heart
- Distinguished Flying Cross
- Air Medal
- World War II Victory Medal
- American Defense Service Medal
- Asiatic-Pacific Campaign Medal
- European-African-Middle Eastern Campaign Medal
- American Campaign Medal
- Marine Corps Expeditionary Medal
- Navy Expeditionary Medal

=== Yugoslavia ===
- Order of the National Hero
- Order of the National Liberation
- Order of Bravery
- Order of the Partisan Star
- Order of Brotherhood and Unity
- Medal of Bravery

== Axis Powers and their allies ==
=== Finland ===
- Order of the Cross of Liberty
  - Mannerheim cross (awarded 1941–1945)
- Order of the White Rose of Finland
- Order of the Lion of Finland

=== Nazi Germany ===
- Iron Cross
- Knight's Cross of the Iron Cross
- German Cross

=== Empire of Japan ===
- Imperial Service Medal
- Russian Campaign Medal
- European Campaign Medal
- China Incident War Medal
- Pacific Campaign Medal
- Imperial Good Conduct Medal
- Order of the Sacred Treasure
- Order of the Golden Kite
- Order of Culture
- Order of the Rising Sun
- Order of the Paulownia Flowers
- Supreme Order of the Chrysanthemum

=== Fascist Italy (1940–1943) ===
- Commemorative Medal of the War Period 1940–43

=== Romania ===
- Order of Michael the Brave
- Order of the Star of Romania
- Cruciada împotriva comunismului

== Non-Participants ==
=== Israel ===
- Volunteer Ribbon
- Fighters against Nazis Medal
- Decoration of State Warriors
