= Belgian Congo in World War II =

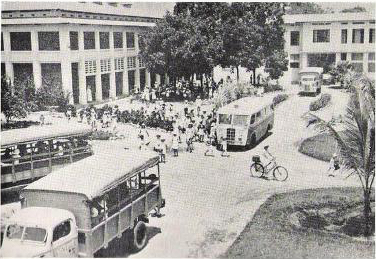
A busy city square in Léopoldville, capital of the Belgian Congo, 1943

The involvement of the Belgian Congo (the modern-day Democratic Republic of the Congo) in World War II began with the German invasion of Belgium in May 1940. Despite Belgium's surrender, the Congo remained in the conflict on the Allied side, administered by the Belgian government in exile.

Economically, the Congo provided much-needed raw materials such as copper and rubber to the United Kingdom and the United States. Uranium from the colony was used to produce the first atomic bombs. At the same time, a large supply of the territory's industrial diamonds were smuggled to Nazi Germany with the complicity of Belgian business executives. The Congo also financially supported the Belgian government in exile. Militarily, Congolese troops of the Force Publique fought alongside British forces in the East African campaign, and a Congolese medical unit served in Madagascar and in the Burma campaign. Congolese formations also acted as garrisons in Egypt, Nigeria and Palestine.

The increasing demands placed on the Congolese population by the colonial authorities during the war, however, provoked strikes, riots and other forms of resistance, particularly from the indigenous Congolese. These were repressed, often violently, by the Belgian colonial authorities. The Congo's comparative prosperity during the conflict led to a wave of post-war immigration from Belgium, bringing the white population to 100,000 by 1950, as well as a period of industrialisation that continued throughout the 1950s. The role played by Congolese uranium during the hostilities caused the country to be of interest to the Soviet Union during the Cold War.

== Background ==
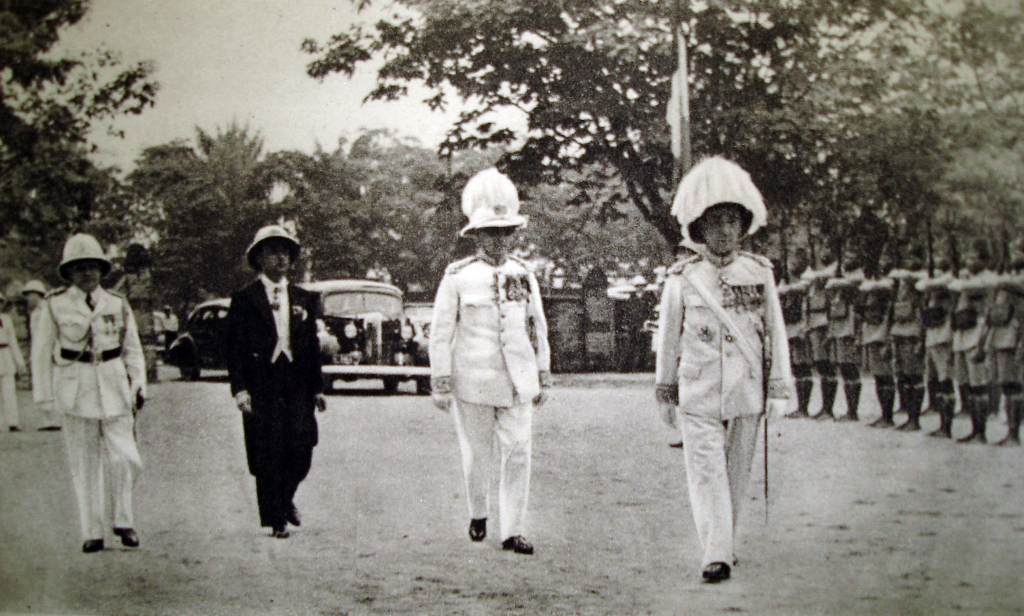
Colonial officials, including the governor-general, Pierre Ryckmans, in Léopoldville in 1938.

Following World War I, Belgium possessed two colonies in Africa: the Belgian Congo, which it had controlled since its annexation of the Congo Free State in 1908, and Ruanda-Urundi, which was formerly the northwestern portion of German East Africa that had been taken over by Belgium in 1916 and was mandated to Belgium in 1922 by the League of Nations. The Belgian colonial military numbered 18,000 soldiers, making it one of the largest standing colonial armies in Africa at the time. The Congo underwent an economic boom in the 1920s and mines, plantations, and transportation networks were greatly developed. The Great Depression led to a collapse of commodity prices, undermining the colony's export-based economy and leading to a large reduction in income and employment. The only industry that expanded during the time period was centered around cotton production.

The Belgian government followed a policy of neutrality during the interwar years. Nazi Germany invaded Belgium on 10 May 1940. After 18 days of fighting, the Belgian Army surrendered and the country was occupied by German forces. King Leopold III, who had surrendered to the Germans, was kept a prisoner for the rest of the war. Just before the fall of Belgium, its government, including the minister of the colonies, Albert de Vleeschauwer, fled to Bordeaux in France.

== Entry of the Congo into the war ==
On 10 May 1940 Belgian officials formally requested that the United Kingdom and France declare their respect for the Congo's neutrality and support for its territorial integrity in a future peace settlement. The British government (Churchill war ministry) refused, wanting to ensure that the Congo would not fall under control of Nazi Germany, and France followed suit. The French government briefly considered sending troops to occupy Léopoldville, the Congolese capital. On the day of the Belgian Army's surrender, the British government, uncertain about what would happen to the territory, held a crisis meeting in London. The British Admiralty proposed sending troops to occupy strategic locations in the Congo, but this was quickly ruled unfeasible due to other military commitments. The British government then resolved that if the Belgian government collapsed, it would support an "independent" Congo.

Within the Congo itself, opinion was divided on whether or not to continue to support the war. Belgian corporate officials hoped that the colony would take a neutral stance, and the staff of the Force Publique, the colonial army, recommended a declaration of neutrality or even independence under the authority of the governor-general of the Congo, Pierre Ryckmans. Ryckmans refused to take this advice, and declared on the day of the Belgian Army's surrender that the colony would remain loyal to the Allies. Despite this assurance, disruption broke out in the city of Stanleyville (now Kisangani in the eastern Congo) among the white population panicking about the future of the colony and the threat of an invasion by the Mussolini regime.

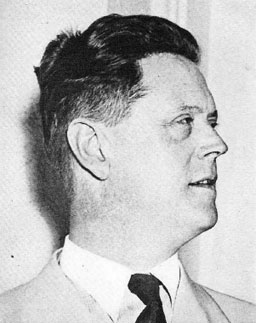
Belgian Minister of Colonies Albert de Vleeschauwer (pictured) argued for continued Belgian participation in the war and pledged the Congo's resources to the Allies.

On 17 June 1940, Philippe Pétain asked Nazi Germany for a ceasefire. Though Ryckmans had declared that he would continue to support the Allied cause, the Belgian government in Bordeaux was deeply disheartened by the French surrender. Prime Minister Hubert Pierlot believed that it lacked the resources to continue to fight and thus it would be better to negotiate a peace with Germany instead of going into exile in the United Kingdom. Most of the ministers agreed; de Vleeschauwer dissented. While the government prepared to negotiate with Nazi Germany, representatives of various Belgo-Congolese companies in Bordeaux informed the ministers of rumours that should Belgium surrender, the United Kingdom would seize control of the Congo. Meanwhile, some circles in occupied Belgium feared that if the Congo aligned itself with the Allies it would be permanently lost as a colony to Belgium. In Brussels, the Germans established a "Kolonial Politisches Büro" that attempted to forge connections with what remained of the Ministry of Colonies.

The British were determined that the Congo should not fall into Axis hands, and planned to invade and occupy the colony if the Belgians did not come to an arrangement. This was particularly because the Allies were desperate for raw materials like rubber which the Congo could produce in abundance. On 20 June the British foreign secretary told the Belgian ambassador in London that the United Kingdom would not accept German dominance over the colony. Meanwhile, Belgo-Congolese businessmen proposed that de Vleeschauwer go to London to ensure that Belgian sovereignty over the Congo would be respected. Pierlot suggested that de Vleeschauwer should be granted the new title of Administrator-general of the Congo, allowing him to pursue this cause even if the government later collapsed and his ministerial mandate became void. The government agreed to the idea, and on 18 June it passed an arrêté-loi, granting de Vleeschauwer the title and conferring on him full legislative and executive power to manage the Congo. The decree also stipulated that in the event the administrator-general was unable to exercise his duties, the responsibility would be passed on to the governor-general. Though granted his own emergency powers in the Congo's colonial charter, Ryckmans interpreted the arrêté-loi as meaning he could take measures in areas not already affected by de Vleeschauwer's orders, and he proceeded to govern the colony through a series of legislative ordinances.

De Vleeschauwer departed for London, arriving on 4 July. He spoke with members of the British government and assured them that he would place all of the Congo's raw materials at the disposal of the United Kingdom's war effort. Over the following months Pierlot and two other ministers managed to reach London while the rest declared their intention to remain in France and resign. In October Pierlot, de Vleeschauwer, and the two other ministers officially established the Belgian government in exile, recognised by the United Kingdom. Despite his presence, de Vleeschauwer was politically marginalised by Finance Minister Camille Gutt and played little role thereafter in the government. There was also conflict between de Vleeschauwer, who wanted to assure his own authority over the Congo, and Foreign Minister Paul-Henri Spaak who sought to be more conciliatory with regard to Allied influence in the colony. Well established and secure in the United Kingdom, the Belgian government replaced the 18 June 1940 arrêté-loi on 29 April 1942, restoring all legislative and executive powers to the government in full.

The Germans were upset by the Congo's support for the Allies, and threatened to apply sanctions to Belgian colonial enterprises. Leopold III expressed his discontent with Ryckman's decisions, believing that the colony should remain neutral. Royalist politicians sent messages to the Belgian authorities in London, attempting to dissuade them from allowing the Congo to support the British war effort. In October 1940 Leopold III requested permission from Nazi German leader Adolf Hitler to dispatch an emissary to Léopoldville to persuade the colonial administration to assume neutrality, but the trip was never authorised.

== Economic contribution ==
=== Allied support ===
"The Belgian Congo has entered the service of the Allies. Its economic doctrine and practices have been rapidly adapted to the new conditions and, whilst everything is being done to maintain the potentiality of the Congo wealth, there is no hesitation whatsoever when it comes to sacrificing any riches in favor of the war effort."

— Albert de Vleeschauwer, Minister of the Colonies, 1942

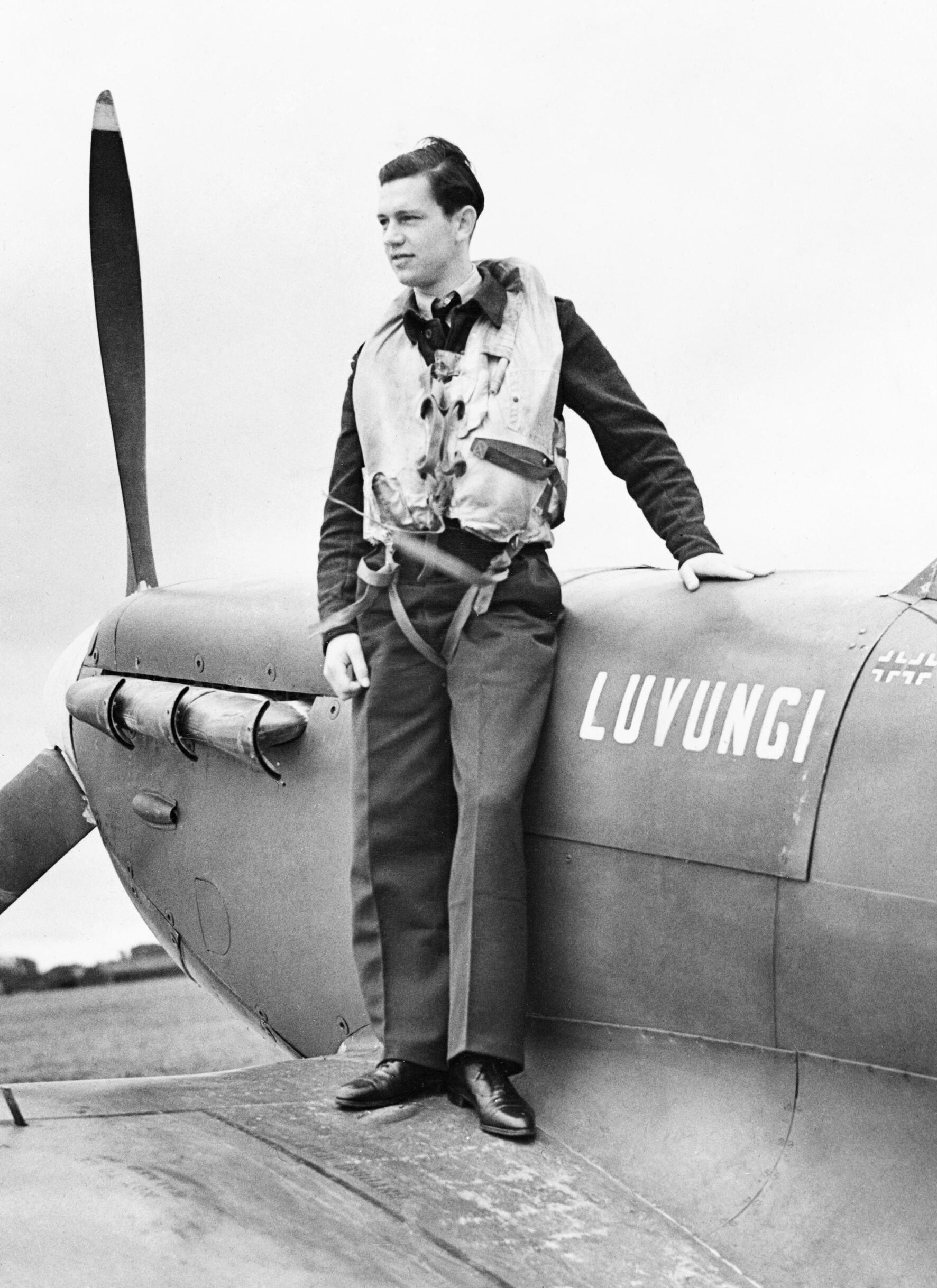
A Belgian pilot in the British Royal Air Force, 1942. His Spitfire aircraft was funded by contributions from the Congo, and took its name, "Luvungi", from the Congolese town of that name.

Soon after the establishment of the Belgian government in exile in London, negotiations began between the Belgians and the British about the role which the Congo would play in the Allied war effort. The two parties came to an arrangement on 21 January 1941, in which all the British demands were accepted, including a 30 percent devaluation of the Congolese franc and the entrance of the Congo into the sterling area. With the official agreement and the Congolese declaration of support for the Allies, the economy of the Congo—in particular its production of important raw materials—was placed at the disposal of the Allies. Though Ryckmans and leaders of the Banque du Congo Belge (the Congo's central bank) were pleased at the entry into the sterling area, which guaranteed an export market for the territory, they strongly disliked the fixed prices the agreement entailed which were favourable to the United Kingdom and worried that only trading with sterling could negatively impact the Congo's foreign exchange reserves. Business leaders in the colony were disgruntled as well, and boosted production of goods not mentioned in the agreement to sell to the neutral United States at their standard market value. In 1942, after the United States joined the Allies, the Belgian government negotiated a new economic agreement with the United States and United Kingdom. Belgian officials never signed it, but it was de facto applied for the rest of the war, and Congolese trade remained directed at the two countries. The Congo's economic output became an even more valuable asset to the Allies after Japan occupied large swathes of South East Asia in 1942, halting those areas' exports of key tropical commodities such as rubber.

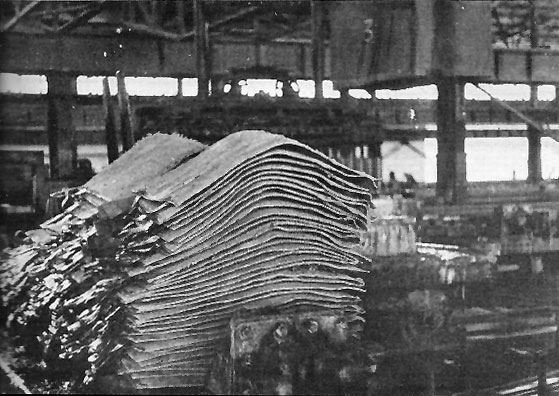
Sheets of copper from the Katanga Province's mines

The Congo had become increasingly centralised economically during the Great Depression of the 1930s, as the Belgian government encouraged the production there of cotton, which had value on the international market. The greatest economic demands on the Congo during the war were related to raw materials. Between 1938 and 1944, the number of workers employed in the mines of the Union Minière du Haut Katanga (UMHK) rose from 25,000 to 49,000 to cope with the increased demand. The colonial administration enacted ultimately successful policies aimed at increasing the size of the Congo's labour force; the number of wage labourers in the colony grew from 480,000 in 1938 to 800,000 in 1945. In order to increase production for the war effort, the colonial authorities increased the hours and the speed at which workers, both European and African, were expected to work. This led to increasing labour unrest across the colony. Forced labour, which had been banned in the 1930s, was reintroduced to keep up with demand; by 1944, the maximum number of days of forced labour per year was raised to 120 for rural Congolese. Discontent among the white population was also increased by the raising of heavy war taxes, which sometimes reached as high as 40 percent. High taxes and price controls were enforced from 1941, limiting the amount of profit that could be made and curbing profiteering. While the price controls aided exports to the Allies, it adversely affected Congolese peasants, who earned less despite their increased amount of labour.

The vast majority of the Congolese-produced raw resources were exported to other Allied countries. According to the Belgian government, by 1942 the entire colony's output of copper and palm oil were being exported to the United Kingdom, while almost all the colony's lumber was sent to South Africa. Exports to the United States also rose from $600,000 in early 1940 to $2,700,000 by 1942. Despite the Allied cooperation, many officials of the colonial administration treated American and British diplomats with suspicion, fearing the potential economic rivalry posed by their countries to Belgian enterprises. The United Kingdom and United States maintained large networks of spies throughout the Congo during the war.

As per a deal reached on 21 March 1941, loans from the Banque du Congo Belge enabled the Belgian government in exile and Free Belgian Forces to fund themselves, unlike most other states in exile, which operated through subsidies and donations from sympathetic governments. It also meant that the Belgian gold reserves, which had been moved to London in 1940, were not needed to fund the war effort, and therefore were still available at the end of the war.

=== Uranium ===
Uranium-235 was mined in the Congo at Shinkolobwe in Katanga before the war by the UMHK for export to Belgium. It was originally used by the medical industry—for radium production—and for colouring ceramics. Scientists in Europe later discovered that enriched uranium could be used in the production of a supposed atomic bomb. The physicists Leo Szilard and Albert Einstein sent U.S. President Franklin D. Roosevelt the Einstein–Szilard letter to warn him of the possibility of a German atomic bomb program and advised him that the Congo was a main source of the mineral. Uranium extracted from the disused Shinkolobwe mine ultimately proved instrumental in the development of an atomic bomb during the Allied Manhattan Project. The director of UMHK, Edgar Sengier, secretly dispatched half of its uranium stock to New York in 1940; in September 1942, he sold it to the United States Army. Sengier himself moved to New York, from where he directed the UMHK's operations for the rest of the war. The Roosevelt government sent soldiers from the Army Corps of Engineers to Shinkolobwe in 1942 to restore the mine and improve its transport links by renovating the local aerodromes and port facilities. In September 1944 the Belgian government reached an agreement with the United Kingdom and the United States, whereby it would sell only those two countries the Congolese uranium at a fixed price.
That year the US government acquired a further 1,720 long tons (1,750 t) of uranium ore from the newly reopened mine. The mine was mostly staffed by Congolese, who laboured in unhealthy conditions.

=== German diamond trafficking ===
During the war there were frequent rumors that some Belgian industrialists involved in colonial enterprises were covertly aiding Germany. American officials found working with Belgo-Congolese mining companies to secure industrial diamonds to be difficult. According to the Belgian government, by 1942 the colony's entire output of industrial diamonds was being shipped to the United Kingdom. In reality, many industrial diamonds were smuggled to Nazi Germany for use in the German war effort. Most Congolese diamonds were mined by Forminière, a subsidiary of the Société Générale de Belgique, which was in turn a member of the De Beers Diamond Syndicate. In 1940, the Syndicate reported that the Congo annually produced 10.9 million carats of diamonds. Immediately after the outbreak of war reported production sharply declined, and by 1942 production had officially fallen to 5 million carats–roughly the original production number minus the amount exported to Germany before the war. Believing that a large volume of diamonds were being smuggled out of the colony, American intelligence officials convinced British agents to inspect the security of the mines. The officer tasked with overseeing the inspection teams concluded that proper security measures were lacking and that Forminière and Société minière du Bécéka personnel fostered a "sinister atmosphere" during the tours. Firmin van Bree, the director of Forminière, was widely suspected of maintaining German sympathies. The German government conducted secret negotiations with leaders of Forminière and the Société Générale, and reached deals that allowed them to purchase large quantities of diamonds until 1944. In 1943 Germany paid the Société Générale $10.5 million for diamonds. American and British agents ultimately uncovered a wide smuggling network that brought diamonds out of the Congo and to German-occupied Europe by air and sea. According to one American report, Belgian diplomatic bags were sometimes used for transporting the gemstones. Proposals by the Americans to stifle the illicit trade were dissuaded by the British Ministry of Economic Warfare, whose Diamond Committee was dominated by members of the De Beers Diamond Syndicate. After the end of the war the Belgian government demanded that Germany pay $25 million owed to the Société Générale for 576,676 carats of diamonds.

== Military involvement ==
=== Force Publique ===
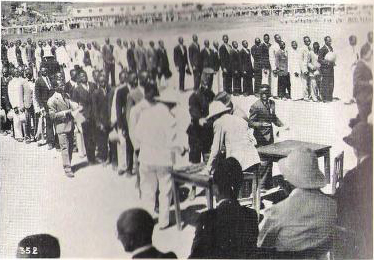
Congolese enlisting in the Force Publique following the outbreak of war

The Force Publique (or "Public Force") was the combined police and military force of both the Congo and Ruanda-Urundi. During World War II, it constituted the bulk of the Free Belgian Forces, numbering over 40,000 men at its peak in 1943. Like other colonial armies of the time, the Force Publique was racially segregated; it was led by 280 white officers and NCOs, but otherwise comprised indigenous black Africans. The Force Publique had never received the more modern equipment supplied to the Belgian Armed Forces before the war, and so had to use outdated weapons and equipment like the Stokes mortar and the Saint Chamond 70 mm howitzer. During the war the force was expanded through recruitment and the calling up of reserves.

De Vleeschauwer authorised the creation of an air service for the Force Publique, and the Belgian government secured an agreement with South Africa in March 1941 to provide training. The first recruits were drawn in by an appeal over Radio Léopoldville by Captain Frans Burniaux, a Belgian pilot who had fled from the Belgian Flying School in North Africa. Many of the pilots ultimately served with the South African Air Force during the war, but their salaries were paid for by the Belgian Congo's treasury.

=== East African campaign ===
While willing to mobilise the Congo's economic resources for the Allied war effort, the Belgian government in exile was initially much more hesitant to deploy Congolese troops in combat. The government also refused to declare war on Germany's ally, Italy, which had colonies in Africa and was fighting to secure British possessions in the continent, because the Belgian royal family had dynastic links with the Italian royal family. This attitude changed after it became known that Italian aircraft based in occupied Belgium were attacking Britain and when an Italian submarine sank a Belgian cargo ship. A Belgian declaration of war was eventually delivered against Italy on 23 November 1940. Two days later, Ryckmans proclaimed that a state of war existed between Italy and the Congo.

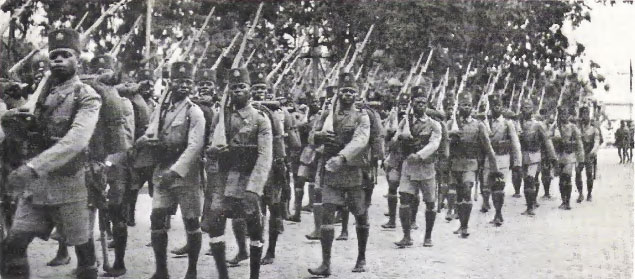
Force Publique soldiers leaving the Congo to participate in the East African campaign in Ethiopia

Three brigades of the Force Publique were sent to Italian East Africa alongside British forces to fight the Italians. The Belgian 1st Colonial Brigade operated in the Galla-Sidamo area in the South-West sector. In May 1941, around 8,000 men of the Force Publique, under Major-General Auguste-Édouard Gilliaert, successfully cut off the retreat of General Pietro Gazzera's Italians at Saïo, in the Ethiopian Highlands after marching over 1,000 kilometres (620 mi) from their bases in western Congo. The troops suffered from malaria and other tropical diseases, but successfully defeated the Italians in a number of engagements. Gilliaert subsequently accepted the surrender of Gazzera and 7,000 Italian troops. Over the course of the campaign in Ethiopia, the Force Publique received the surrender of nine Italian generals, 370 high-ranking officers and 15,000 Italian colonial troops before the end of 1941. The Congolese forces in Ethiopia suffered about 500 fatalities.

After the Allied victory in Ethiopia, the Force Publique moved to the British colony of Nigeria, which was being used as a staging ground for a planned invasion of Vichy-controlled Dahomey which did not occur, was also garrisoned by 13,000 Congolese troops. Then a part of the Force Publique went to Egypt and British Mandatory Palestine and was redesignated the 1st Belgian Congo Brigade Group during 1943 and 1944.

=== Medical support ===
A medical unit from the Congo, the 10th (Belgian Congo) Casualty Clearing Station, was formed in 1943, and served alongside British forces during the invasion of Madagascar and in the Far East during the Burma campaign. The unit (which had a small body of Force Publique troops for local defense of the station) included 350 black and 20 white personnel, and continued to serve with the British until 1945.

== Life in the Belgian Congo ==
At the start of the war, the population of the Congo numbered approximately 12 million black people and 30,000 white people. The colonial government segregated the population along racial lines and there was very little mixing between the colours. The white population was highly urbanised and, in Léopoldville, lived in a quarter of the city separated from the black majority. All blacks in the city had to adhere to a curfew. The colonial authorities arrested enemy aliens in the Congo and confiscated their property in 1940. The State Security Service maintained a large presence in the colony and closely monitored the foreign population. The colonial administration tried to conceal the war from the African population by censoring the media, but the Congolese noticed the internal tensions among the white population and the detention of German and Italian nationals. To better counter external influences in the colony, the administration established a Bureau of Information and Propaganda. About 3,000 Greek refugees were settled in the Congo during the war. Some European Jews, particularly those of Italian nationality, also settled in the Congo before and during the war to avoid anti-Semitic discrimination and find economic opportunities, though the Italian Jews in Katanga Province were interned by order of the governor in 1940. Some Jewish merchants in Élisabethville had swastikas graffitied on their stores.

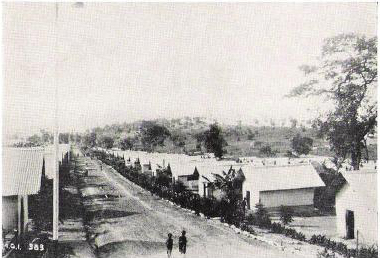
Congolese worker housing, c. 1943

The demands of the colonial administration fell hardest on rural residents, which were conscripted for road construction projects and rubber harvesting. Conditions were harsh for the labourers, and in some cases were conflated in the Congolese collective memory with the earlier atrocities committed by the Congo Free State in relation to its rubber collection system. The urbanised Congolese generally experienced more financial gain during the war than their rural counterparts, though several workers who had collected large amounts of rubber earned even more money. During the war the Belgian government in exile directed propaganda at the Allied states that created a positive image of its colony in an attempt to legitimise its rule. In New York City, the Belgian Information Center released numerous publications which asserted that the Belgians had rescued the Congolese from "terrible conditions" and improved life in the territory. Wider Allied propaganda also downplayed internal political tensions within the Congo and in its relations with the Belgian government so as to portray the coordination of its war effort in a harmonious fashion.

The Belgian colonial administration maintained a paternalistic attitude towards the indigenous Congolese. Education was overwhelmingly controlled by Protestant and Catholic missions, which were also responsible for providing limited welfare support to the rural Congolese. The occupation of Belgium severed Belgian missionaries from their parent organisations, causing the colonial administration to subsidise their activities to make up for budget deficits. The war did not adversely impact their evangelising, and the number of reported baptisms conducted increased from 1,824,000 in 1939 to a cumulative total of 2,214,000 in 1942. Healthcare was provided by a mix of government and corporate physicians, private practitioners, and missionaries. At the outbreak of the war there were 302 doctors working in the Congo. Some medical personnel accompanied the Force Publique on its foreign deployments, but the vast majority remained in the colony for the conflict's duration. Unlike the neighboring French possessions, the war did not adversely affect the resources of healthcare providers in the Congo. Medical research continued and a new journal was created so that findings could be published while the territory was separated from Belgium.

Food remained unrationed during the war, with only the sales of tires and automobiles restricted by the government. Nevertheless, the war did lead to a shortage of consumer goods. The devaluation of the Congolese franc also made foreign imports more expensive. One of the consequences of the Congo's economic mobilisation during the war, particularly for the black population, was significant urbanisation. Just 9% of the indigenous population lived in cities in 1938; by 1950, the figure stood at close to 20%. The colonial government also greatly improved transport and production facilities during the war.

== Unrest ==
=== Strikes ===
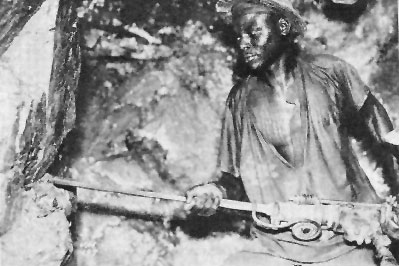
Katangese miner

The demands made by the colonial government on Congolese workers during the war provoked strikes and riots from the workforce. Whites in the colony were allowed to form trade unions for the first time during the war, and their demands for better pay and working conditions were often emulated by black workers. A lack of European skilled labor forced the colonial government to train and give native Congolese skilled labor positions for the first time, but they were paid less than their white colleagues, generating discontent. In October 1941, white workers in the colony unsuccessfully attempted a general strike across the colony.

"Why should a white man be paid more than a black, when all the white man does is stand there, giving orders, his arms behind his back and with his pipe in his mouth? We should take our rights, or we won't work tomorrow."

— Léonard Mpoyi, December 1941

In December 1941, black mine workers at various sites in Katanga Province, including Jadotville and Élisabethville, went on strike, demanding that their pay be increased from 1.50 francs to 2 francs to compensate for rising living costs. The strike started on 3 December, and by the next day 1,400 workers had downed tools. All UMHK sites were affected by 9 December. The strike was also fueled by other grievances against the colonial order and segregation.

A painting of the Élisabethville massacre by Tshibumba Kanda-Matulu, a Congolese artist, depicting the church and colonial state (personified at the right) as the instigators

From the start, the colonial authorities attempted to persuade the strikers to disperse and go back to work. When they refused, they were fired on. In Jadotville, 15 strikers were shot dead by the military. In Élisabethville, the strikers, including their leader Léonard Mpoyi, were invited to negotiations at the town's stadium, where they were offered various concessions, including a 30% pay rise. When the workers refused, the governor of Katanga, Amour Maron, shot Mpoyi, killing him. The governor then ordered his soldiers to fire on the other strikers in the stadium. Between 60 and 70 strikers were killed during the protest, although the official estimate was around 30. The miners returned to work on 10 December.

Numerous smaller strikes occurred in the Congo later in the war, though not on the same scale as in 1941. In 1944 strikes broke out in Katanga and Kasaï, provoked by the conscription of workers for the mines and deteriorating working conditions. That year the Belgians conducted a few "police operations" in the province of Équateur to ensure disgruntled labourers would collect rubber. In 1945, riots and strikes occurred among the black dockworkers in the port city of Matadi.

=== Luluabourg mutiny ===
The colonial government in the Congo depended on its military to maintain civil order and, above all, it depended on the loyalty of the native troops who made up the bulk of the Force Publique. Black non-commissioned officers led by First Sergeant-Major Ngoie Mukalabushi, a veteran of the East African campaign, mutinied at Luluabourg in the central Congolese province of Kasaï in February 1944; the trigger for this was a plan to vaccinate troops who had served at the front, though the soldiers were also unhappy about the demands placed on them and their treatment by their white officers.

The mutineers broke into the base's armoury on the morning of 20 February and pillaged the white quarter of the town. The town's inhabitants fled, and a Belgian officer and two white civilians were killed. The mutineers attacked visible signs of the colonial authorities and proclaimed their desire for independence. The mutineers then dispersed to their home villages, pillaging on the way; they failed to spread the insurrection to neighbouring garrisons. Two mutineers, including Mukalabushi, were executed for their part in the insurrection.

== Legacy ==
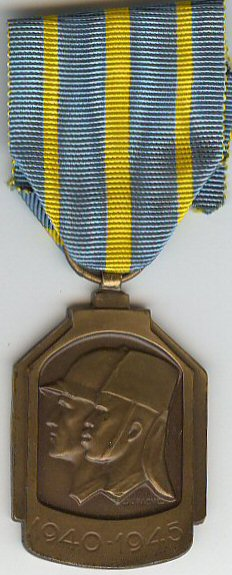
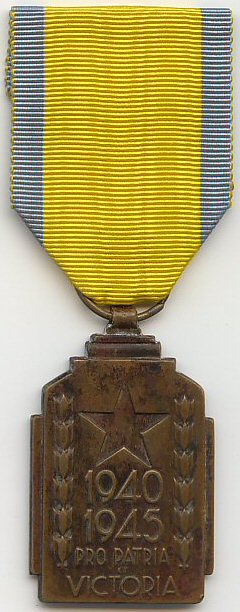
Medals awarded for service in the Force Publique (left) and in the colonial war effort (right).

Official postwar Belgian rhetoric portrayed the Congo's attitude towards the mother country as one of "unfailing solidarity." As a result of the Congo's comparative prosperity during the conflict, the post-war period saw a wave of immigration to the country from Belgium. By 1950, 100,000 whites were living in the Congo. Nevertheless, the war highlighted the precarious nature of the colonial administration, leading Governor Ryckmans to remark that "the days of colonialism are over" in 1946. A feeling by the Belgian government prevailed that it had incurred a "war debt" to the Congo, and thus more attention was given to the concerns of the indigenous population. In the years after the war, the colonial government underwent extensive reform. Black people were granted significantly more rights and freedoms, leading to the growth of a so-called Évolué ("evolved") class. Despite this, the Belgian policy of conscripted labour of 60 days a year from each native Congolese remained in effect until Congolese independence, whereas similar labour levies were abolished in British and French possessions after the war. Several black members of the Force Publique who were veterans of the war served in prominent roles in the army after Congolese independence, including Louis Bobozo, Eugene Ebeya and Norbert Muké.

Following the industrial unrest, trade unions for black workers were instituted in 1946, though they lacked power and influence. Workers at the UMHK continued to demand higher wages, and strikes were common in the colony for the next decade. Nevertheless, both wages and living conditions improved significantly in the years after the war. The war began a second wave of industrialisation that lasted right up to Congolese independence in 1960.

The 1941 Élisabethville massacre is a recurrent theme in Congolese art and folklore, and was later incorporated into the popular Congolese anti-colonial narrative. Historiographic discussion of the Congo's role in World War II is generally limited to mentions of the uranium extracted from Shinkolobwe. The importance of Congolese uranium during the war caused the Soviet Union to become interested in the territory; it was subsequently an area of Soviet interest during the Cold War. The war also led to a re-orientation of the Congo's trade away from Belgium and towards the United States, the United Kingdom, and the United Kingdom's colonies.

=== Commemoration ===
In 1943, a three-sided pyramid was erected in Faradje, Belgian Congo to commemorate the actions of the Congolese in Ethiopia. Each face of the pyramid was inscribed with the name of each major location of fighting: Asosa, Gambela, and Saïo. Many locations throughout the country—presently the Democratic Republic of the Congo—are named for the battles. In 1970 the Belgian government dedicated a monument in Schaerbeek, Belgium, to the military successes of Belgian colonial forces, including those during World War II.

== See also ==
- Belgium in World War II
- Free Belgian forces
- Ruzagayura famine (1943–44)
- List of massacres in the Democratic Republic of the Congo

== Works cited ==
- Byfield, Judith A.; Brown, Carolyn A.; Parsons, Timothy; Sikainga, Ahmad Alawad (2015). Africa and World War II. Cambridge University Press. ISBN 9781107053205.
- Martin, Phyllis M. (1985). "Reviewed Work: Le Congo Belge durant la Seconde Guerre Mondiale: Recueil d'Etudes". The Journal of African History. 26 (4): 422–424. doi:10.1017/S0021853700028905. JSTOR 181666. S2CID 245917939.
- Farrell-Robert, Janine (2007). Glitter & Greed: The Secret World of the Diamond Cartel (revised ed.). Red Wheel Weiser. ISBN 9781609258801.
- Fernández Soriano, Victor (2018). "'Travail et progrès': Obligatory 'Educational' Labour in the Belgian Congo, 1933–60". Journal of Contemporary History. 53 (2): 292–314. doi:10.1177/0022009417697807. S2CID 220318599.
- Geenen, Kristien (2019). "Categorizing colonial patients: Segregated medical care, space and decolonization in a Congolese city, 1931–62". The Journal of the International African Institute. 89 (1): 100–124. doi:10.1017/S0001972018000724. ISSN 1750-0184. S2CID 151174421.
- Gondola, Ch. Didier (2002). The History of Congo. Greenwood histories of the modern nations (illustrated, annotated ed.). Greenwood Publishing Group. ISBN 978-0-313-31696-8. ISSN 1096-2905.
- Heyse, T. (1946). "L'exercice du pouvoir législatif colonial pendant la période 1939-1945" (PDF). Bulletins des Séances (in French). 17 (1): 269–288.
- Omasombo Tshonda, Jean, ed. (2018). Haut-Katanga : Lorsque richesses économiques et pouvoirs politiques forcent une identité régionale (PDF). Provinces (in French). Vol. 1. Tervuren: Musée royal de l’Afrique centrale. ISBN 978-9-4926-6907-0.
- Pepin, Jacques (2011). The Origins of AIDS. Cambridge University Press. ISBN 9781139501415.
- Sampson, Henry (1957). The Dumpy Book of Air Forces of the World. London: Sampson, Low. OCLC 8912360.
- Stanard, Matthew (2009). The Leopard, the Lion, and the Cock: Colonial Memories and Monuments in Belgium. Leuven University Press. ISBN 9789462701793.
- Stanard, Matthew G. (2014). "Belgium, the Congo, and Imperial Immobility: A Singular Empire and the Historiography of the Single Analytic Field". French Colonial History. 15: 87–109. doi:10.14321/frencolohist.15.2014.0087. ISSN 1543-7787. S2CID 145671886.
- Van der Wee, Herman; Verbreyt, Monique (2009). A Small Nation in the Turmoil of the Second World War: Money, Finance and Occupation (Belgium, Its Enemies, Its Friends, 1939-1945) (revised ed.). Leuven: Leuven University Press. ISBN 9789058677594.
- Vanthemsche, Guy (2012). Belgium and the Congo, 1885–1980. New York: Cambridge University Press. ISBN 978-0-521-19421-1.
- Veranneman, Jean-Michel (2014). Belgium in the Second World War (illustrated ed.). Barnsley: Pen and Sword. ISBN 9781783376070.
- Weller, George (1942). The Belgian Campaign in Ethiopia: A Trek of 2,500 Miles through Jungle Swamps and Desert Wastes. New York: Belgian Information Center. OCLC 1452395.
- Willame, Jean-Claude (1972). Patrimonialism and Political Change in the Congo. Stanford: Stanford University Press. ISBN 978-0-8047-0793-0.
- Williams, Susan (2018). Spies in the Congo: The Race for the Ore that Built the Atomic Bomb. Oxford University Press. ISBN 9781787380653.
- Young, Crawford (1965). Politics in the Congo: Decolonization and Independence. Princeton: Princeton University Press. OCLC 307971.
