= Commemorative Medal of the African Campaigns =

Italian military award

Commemorative Medal of the African Campaigns (1894–1923) Medal in Memory of the Campaigns and Service Provided in the Italian Colonies of East Africa and in the Related Areas of Influence (1923–1935)
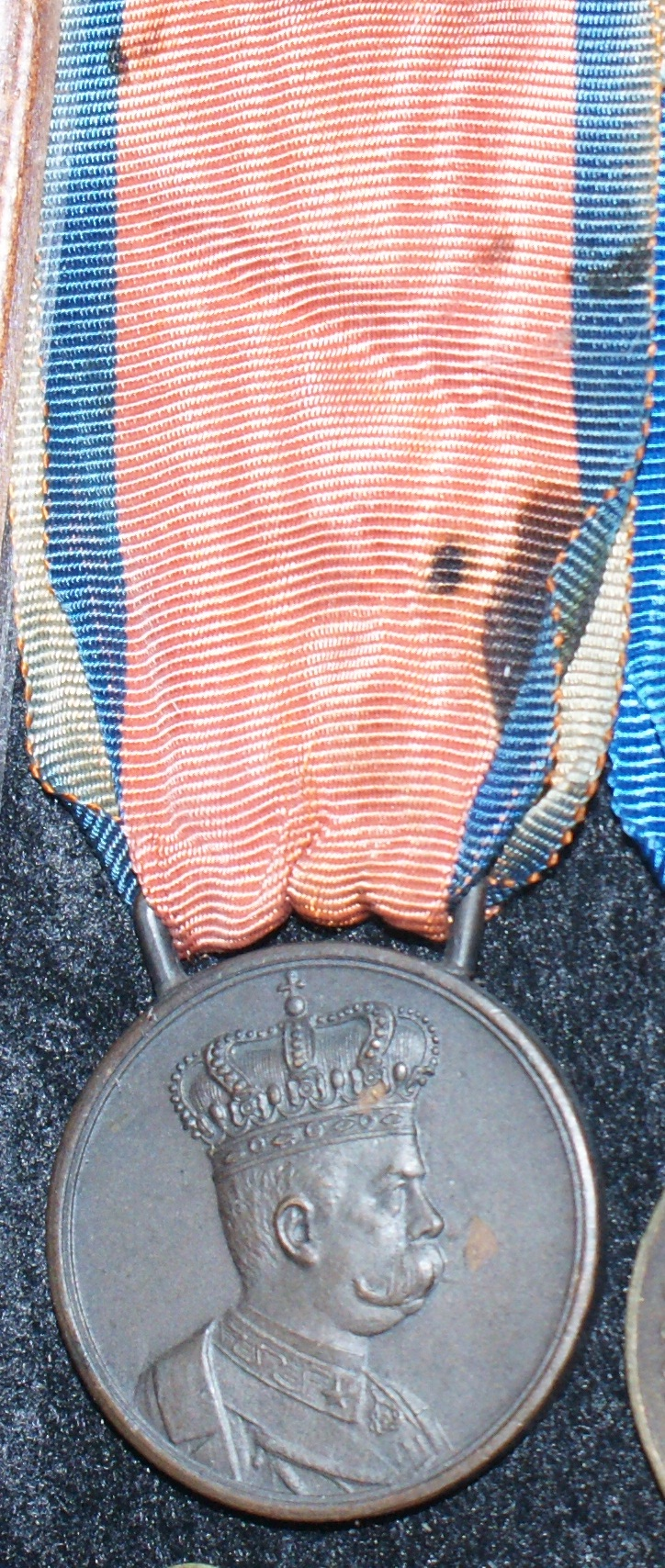
- The obverse of the medal.
- Type: Commemorative medal
- Awarded for: Service in Italian colonies in East Africa
- Presented by: Kingdom of Italy
- Eligibility: Military and civilian personnel
- Status: Abolished 10 May 1937 (effective 3 October 1935)
- Established: 3 November 1894
- Ribbon of the medal

Precedence
- Next (higher): Commemorative Medal for Military Operations in East Africa
- Next (lower): Commemorative Medal of the Spanish Campaign

The Commemorative Medal of the African Campaigns (Italian: Medaglia commemorativa delle campagne d'Africa) was a decoration established in 1894 by the Kingdom of Italy for personnel who took part in Italian military operations in Africa between 1887 and 1896 as the Italian Empire began its expansion during the Scramble for Africa. As the Italian Empire expanded in East Africa, the medal's applicability was extended in 1906 and 1923 to include additional service in the region.

In 1923 it was renamed the Medal in Memory of the Campaigns and Service Provided in the Italian Colonies of East Africa and in the Related Areas of Influence (Italian: Medaglia a ricordo delle campagne e del servizio prestato nelle colonie italiane dell'Africa Orientale e nelle relative zone d'influenza). In 1927, the medal's applicability again was expanded to additional geographical areas of service, and eligibility for it extended to Regia Aeronautica ("Royal Air Force") personnel for the first time. In 1937, the Commemorative Medal for Military Operations in East Africa replaced it, with the replacement backdated to 1935.

== History ==
King Umberto I established the Commemorative Medal of the African Campaigns with Royal Decree Number 463 of 3 November 1894 to recognize personnel who had taken part in the various military campaigns carried out by Italy during its first attempts at colonial expansion in Africa between 1887 and 1896, which led to the creation of the colonies of Eritrea and Italian Somaliland.

King Victor Emmanuel III modified the original legislation establishing the medal with Royal Decree Number 562 of 5 October 1906 and then again with Royal Decree Number 2067 of 27 August 1923. Given the lack of combat actions in Eritrea and Italian Somaliland in the years since the original decree and the involvement of Italian forces based in those colonies in conflicts elsewhere in the expanding Italian Empire, notably in Libya during and since Italy's conquest of Ottoman Libya in the Italo-Turkish War of 1911–1912, the 1923 decree in particular expanded the geographic eligibility for the medal to parts of Africa outside of Eritrea and Italian Somaliland and renamed it the Medal in Memory of the Campaigns and Service Provided in the Italian Colonies of East Africa and in the Related Areas of Influence.

With Royal Decree Number 1898 of 1927, Victor Emmanuel III further expanded geographic eligibility for the medal for operations in Italian East Africa and for the first time extended eligibility for the medal to personnel of the Regia Aeronautica ("Royal Air Force"), which had been founded in 1923.

With Royal Decree Number 2463 of 10 May 1937, Victor Emmanuel III replaced the medal, with effect backdated to 3 October 1935 (the first day of the Second Italo-Ethiopian War), with the Commemorative Medal for Military Operations in East Africa (Italian: Medaglia commemorativa delle operazioni militari in Africa Orientale), without prejudice to the rights of those who already had been awarded the medal.

== Eligibiity ==
The various decrees establishing and modifying eligibility for the medal led to a lengthy and complicated set of eligibility requirements. As requirements evolved over time from the originally prescribed eligibility of 1894 and modifications were promulgated in 1906, 1923, and 1927, personnel qualified for the medal if they met any one of the following criteria, labeled "a" through "f" in the various decrees:

a) Served in, or as a civilian in support of, the Italian Royal Army (Italian: Regio Esercito) or Regia Marina ("Royal Navy") — expanded to include the Regia Aeronautica ("Royal Air Force") in 1927 — in one of the African campaigns or "in a territory in the zone of Italian influence in Africa." Civilians who served in the colonial government for a minimum of one year, increased to two years in 1906, also qualified for the medal. In 1923, the requirement was modified to grant eligibility to personnel who served in one or more military campaigns in Italian East Africa or served for two continuous years in Italian East Africa — including Regia Marina personnel stationed ashore or aboard ships operating there — and to personnel who served in the sultanates of Somalia that were protectorates of Italy, as well as to personnel who took part in exploration, reconnaissance, or military expeditions under the authority of the colonial government beyond the boundaries of the colony itself. Under the 1923 decree, personnel who interrupted their service in Italian East Africa to serve in other colonies or aboard ships operating in other colonies could qualify for the medal as long as their total, nonconsecutive service in Italian East Africa totaled two years and they did not receive an assignment in Italy itself prior to completion of the nonconsecutive total of two years of service. In addition, personnel who spent at least two years assigned to Italian colonies in Africa at least one year of which was in Eritrea or Italian Somaliland also qualified for the medal. For personnel sent from Eritrea or Italian Somaliland to Libya, the two-year rule applied as of 1 February 1912.

b) Held the office of governor; "second commander" (changed to "deputy governor" in 1906 and to "general secretary" in 1923); "higher commander of the troops" (changed to "commander of the troops" in 1923); or "maritime commander" (changed to "senior naval commander" in 1923).

c) Took part in the 1887 expedition, changed in 1906 to "expedition embarked in January 1885," without clasp.

d) Took part in the expeditions of 1887–1888 during the Italo-Ethiopian War of 1887–1889, the 1895–1896 campaign during the First Italo-Ethiopian War, or the 1897 campaign against the Dervishes during the Mahdist War.

e) Took part in expeditions for the occupation of Keren in June 1889, Asmara in August 1889, or Adowa in January 1890.

f) Took part honorably in one of the following military events in Eritrea or Italian Somaliland: In Eritrea, the Siege of Saati on 25 January 1887, the Battle of Dogali on 26 January 1887, the Battle of Segheneyti on 5 August 1888, the First Battle of Agordat on 27 June 1890, the Battle of Halat on 22 February 1891, the Battle of Serobeti on 16 June 1892, the Second Battle of Agordat on 21 December 1893, the Battle of Kassala on 17 July 1894, the Battle of Halai on 19 December 1894, or the Battle of Coatit on 13 and 14 January 1895; in Italian Somaliland, the Battle of Lafoole on 25 November 1896, the Battle of Gelib on 26–27 August 1905, the Battle of Dhanane (or Turunley) on 9–10 February 1907, the Battle of Bagallei on 15 December 1907, the Battle of Dongab on 2 March 1908, the Battle of Mellet on 11–12 July 1908, the Battle of Arare on 24 September 1908, the Battle of Bullalo on 23 September 1908, the Battle of Buloburti on 27 March 1916, or the cycle of military operations for the effective occupation of the territories of northern Italian Somaliland between 23 September 1925 and 27 February 1927.

Indigenous soldiers of the Royal Corps of Colonial Troops (Italian: Regi corpi di truppe coloniali) of Eritrea and Italian Somaliland, hired native bands, or other irregular forces qualified for the medal only if they took part in at least one of the armed incidents mentioned in sections d) or f) above.

Also qualifying for the medal were Italian Army and Regia Marina personnel, officials of the central and colonial governments, and Italian citizens sent to a territory in the Italian zone of influence in Africa, or who carried out exploration, reconnaissance, or missions recognized as important for Italian interests and for the proper functioning of colonial services, even if the time spent was less than two years. In 1923 the phrase "in a territory in the zone of Italian influence in Africa" was replaced by the phrase "in the territory of the Italian colonies of East Africa or in the other territories specified under the previous letter a)."

In 1927 the authorization to wear the medal also was granted to civilian and provisional military personnel, to military personnel belonging to the Italian Army or the Regia Marina, to personnel of the Voluntary Militia for National Security (Italian: Milizia volontaria per la sicurezza nazionale or MVSN), i.e., the Blackshirts, and to indigenous military personnel and non-military personnel assigned to civil services who had served, for no less than three months, in the territory of Oltre Giuba ("Trans-Juba") — ceded by the United Kingdom to Italy under terms of a convention dated 15 July 1924 — during the period between Italy's first occupation of Oltre Giuba on 29 June 1925 and 30 June 1926, when Oltre Giuba was annexed to Italian Somaliland, regardless of the time limits established by the 1894 founding decree. Those who were already authorized to wear the commemorative medal for other reasons could wear a clasp recognizing duty in Oltre Giuba in lieu of an additional award of the medal itself.

The provisions of Article 22 of the Royal Decree of 28 September 1855 on the reorganization of the Military Order of Savoy were applicable to this medal in relation to cases in which the right to wear it was lost or suspended. The ministerial instructions on how to request authorization to wear the medal were published in the Official Gazette of the Kingdom of Italy Number 284 of 4 December 1894, updated in 1895, and repealed and replaced by the Norme per la concessione della medaglia d'Africa ("Rules for the granting of the African medal") published in the Official Journal Number 161 of 9 July 1896.

== Appearance ==
=== Medal ===
The medal consists of a bronze disc with a diameter of 32 millimetres (1.26 in). The obverse depicts a half bust of King Umberto I looking to the right, which remained unchanged after Victor Emmanuel III became king in 1900. The reverse has the inscription Campagne d'Africa ("African Campaigns"), surrounded by two laurel branches in the form of a crown.

=== Ribbon ===
The 33-millimetre (1.3 in) ribbon is red with blue edges.

=== Clasps ===
Various clasps were authorized for wear with the medal to indicate specific campaigns and actions in which the wearer participated. These included, but were not limited to:

- A clasp inscribed Spedizione 1887 ("1887 Expedition"), authorized along with the creation of the medal itself in the 1894 decree but abolished by the decree of 1906.
- A clasp inscribed Oltre Giuba ("Trans-Juba") for service in Oltre Juba between 29 June 1925 and 30 June 1926.
- A clasp inscribed Somalia Settentrionale 1925–27 ("Northern Somalia 1925–27") to recognize service in the cycle of military operations for the effective occupation of the territories of northern Italian Somaliland between 23 September 1925 and 27 February 1927, regardless of the time required to be entitled to the medal and the recognition of service in military campaigns.

=== Wear ===
The medal was worn on the left side of the chest. Originally, the ribbon was not to be worn without the medal, but Royal Decree Number 562 of 1906 authorized wearing the ribbon alone on the ordinary uniform authorized by Royal Decree Number 470 of 1906.
