= Chief of Staff Medal of Appreciation =

Medal of Appreciation of the Chief of Staff
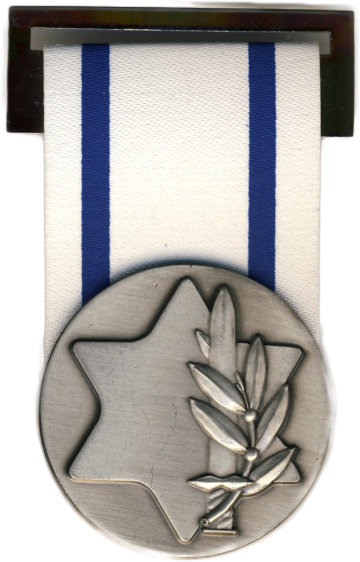
- Type: Order of Honour
- Awarded for: exceptionally distinguished service or merit in senior command or staff positions
- Presented by: Israeli Defense Force
- Eligibility: Members of the Israeli Armed Forces and foreign military members
- Status: Currently issued
- Established: 1981; 45 years ago

Highlights
- Total awarded posthumously: 4
- Ribbon

Precedence
- Next (higher): Chief of Staff Citation
- Next (lower): Medal of Appreciation of Officer Commanding Territorial Command (Major General)
- Related: Medal for Service in Israel

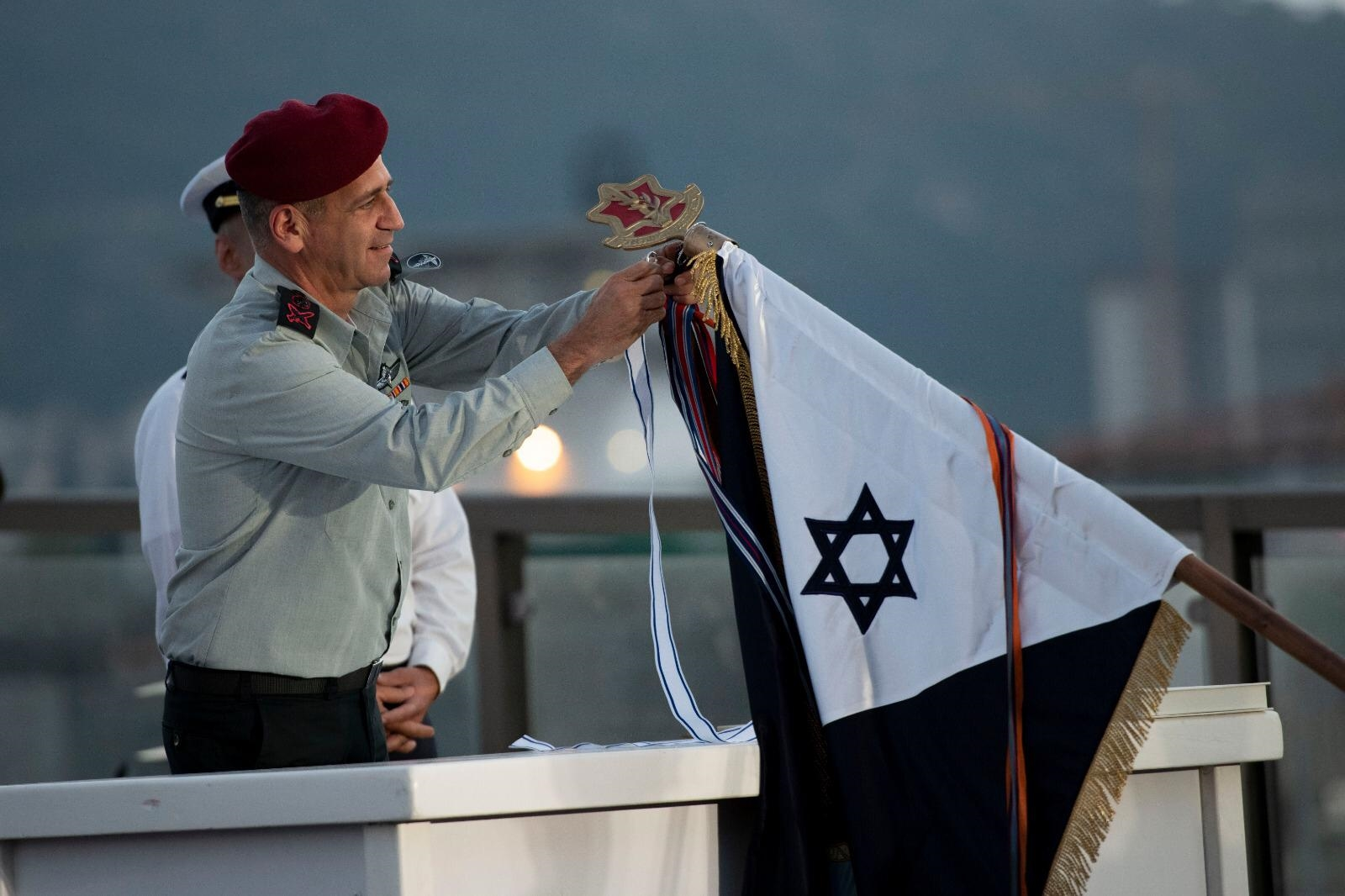
Chief of Staff Aviv Kochavi awarding the medal to the Israel Missile Boats Flotilla (3rd Flotilla) in 2019.

The Chief Of Staff Medal of Appreciation (Hebrew: אות הערכה מטעם הרמטכ"ל) is an Israeli military decoration.

The medal was instituted in 1981. It is awarded to both civilians and military personnel who contribute to the strengthening of the IDF or the security of Israel; the medal could also be awarded to foreign civilians.

The medal's most well-known recipient is the Israeli astronaut Ilan Ramon, who was awarded the medal after his death during a mission of the Space Shuttle Columbia.

It has since been given 10 times; 4 posthumously, 2 group awards (Iron Dome and Patriot missile defense soldiers), and the rest to individuals (most of them American).

== Design ==
The medal is round; on the front there is a Star of David with an olive branch and a sword rest on its left; the reverse is plain.

The medal is attached to a white ribbon with two blue strips on the edges, similar to those on the Israeli flag.

== Notable recipients ==
Notable recipients include:

- Colonel Ilan Ramon, IAF (posthumously)
- General Martin Dempsey, USA (Chairman Joint Chiefs of Staff)
- General Joseph Dunford, USMC (Chairman Joint Chiefs of Staff)
- Members of the Kiryat Arba Emergency Response Team for 2002 Hebron ambush
  - Yitzhak Buanish (posthumously)
  - Alexander Zwitman (posthumously)
  - Alexander Dohan (posthumously)
  - Elijah Libman
- Operation Protective Edge units
  - Iron Dome units
  - Technological unit of the Military Intelligence Directorate
