= Badge of Honor for the "Volunteers of Freedom" Patriots =

Italian military award

- Type: Commemorative medal
- Awarded for: Service in the Italian resistance or Co-belligerent forces during World War II, or who resistaed collaboration with the Axis powers while held as prisoners-of-war
- Presented by: Kingdom of Italy
- Eligibility: Military personnel and civilians
- Established: 3 May 1945

Precedence
- Next (higher): War Merit Cross
- Next (lower): Commemorative Medal for Military Operations in East Africa

The Badge of Honor for the "Volunteers of Freedom" Patriots (Italian: Distintivo d'onore per i patrioti "Volontari della Libertà") is an award established by the Kingdom of Italy to recognize those who participated in the armed struggle of the Italian resistance movement or Italian Co-belligerent Forces against Axis forces in Italy during World War II or who refused to collaborate with Axis forces after being taken prisoner by Nazi Germany.

== History ==
Fascist Italy — the Kingdom of Italy under Prime Minister Benito Mussolini — entered World War II on the side of the Axis powers in June 1940. On 9 September 1943, Italy surrendered to the Allies, and the Kingdom of Italy, which controlled southern Italy, switched to the Allied side, entering a status of co-belligerence with them, its armed forces becoming known as the Italian Co-belligerent Army, Italian Co-belligerent Air Force, and Italian Co-belligerent Navy. In response, Nazi Germany forcibly occupied the rest of Italy and installed Mussolini as the leader of the Italian Social Republic in northern Italy, which continued the war on the Axis side. An Italian resistance movement arose to combat the German occupation and the Italian Social Republic. These events resulted between 1943 and 1945 in the Kingdom of Italy's co-belligerent forces participating in Allied operations against German and Italian Social Republic forces during the Italian campaign, guerrilla actions by the Italian resistance against German forces, and a simultaneous Italian Civil War pitting the Italian co-belligerent and resistance forces against those of the Italian Social Republic. In Italy, these simultaneous conflicts are known collectively as the "War of Liberation."

On 8 September 1943, the National Liberation Committee (Italian: Comitato di Liberazione Nazionale, or CLN) was formed as a political umbrella organization and the main representative of the Italian resistance movement. On 9 January 1944, the CLN approved the creation of the Corpo Volontari della Libertà (CVL, "Volunteers of Freedom Corps") to serve as a general command to coordinate the actions of the various partisan groups of the resistance, and the CVL became operational on 9 June 1944.

With the war still underway, the Kingdom of Italy created the Badge of Honor for the "Volunteers of Freedom" Patriots (Italian: Distintivo d'onore per i patrioti "Volontari della Libertà") with Lieutenant Legislative Decree Number 350 on 3 May 1945. It made all members of the CVL and the Italian Co-belligerent Forces eligible for the badge. Germany surrendered five days later, on 8 May 1945.

With Law No. 907 of 1 December 1977, the Italian Republic extended eligibility for the badge to Italian military personnel who were deported to German concentration camps after 8 September 1943 and who contributed to the Italian resistance struggle by refusing release from the camps to serve the German occupying forces in Italy or the Italian Social Republic and by not collaborating voluntarily with the Germans or the fascists of the Italian Social Republic.

== Eligibiity ==
Personnel who were part of formations recognized by the National Liberation Committee who had been wounded in combat or served continuously in those formations for no less than three months are eligible for the badge, which is made available to them free of charge at the expense of the state. To qualify for the badge, military personnel needed a special authorization resulting from a certificate issued by the ministry of war, ministry of aeronautics, or ministry of the navy, while civilians require a similar certificate from the Ministry of Occupied Italy.

Personnel interested in receiving the badge could submit an application to the military district to which they belonged, which granted the badge after obtaining the opinion of the National Association of Former Internees. An appeal could be lodged against the negative decision of the military district to the Ministry of Defence within 90 days of the date of notification.

== Appearance ==
The badge consists of a 37-millimetre (1.5 in) wide magenta ribbon bordered vertically on both sides with the colors of the flag of Italy. The letters "V L" — an abbreviation for Volontari della Libertà ("Volunteers of Freedom") — in golden metal are superimposed in the center of the ribbon.

=== Wear ===
The badge is worn on the left side of the chest.

Although the badge consists only of the ribbon, it was often unofficially "enriched" with the medal established for war volunteers, used instead of the authorized ribbon for that badge. This continued a custom established after World War I with the War Labor Badge, established by Royal Decree Number 655 of 3 May 1918 to recognize the risks and inconvenience railway agents faced during World War I.
