= Commemorative Medal for Military Operations in East Africa =

Italian military award

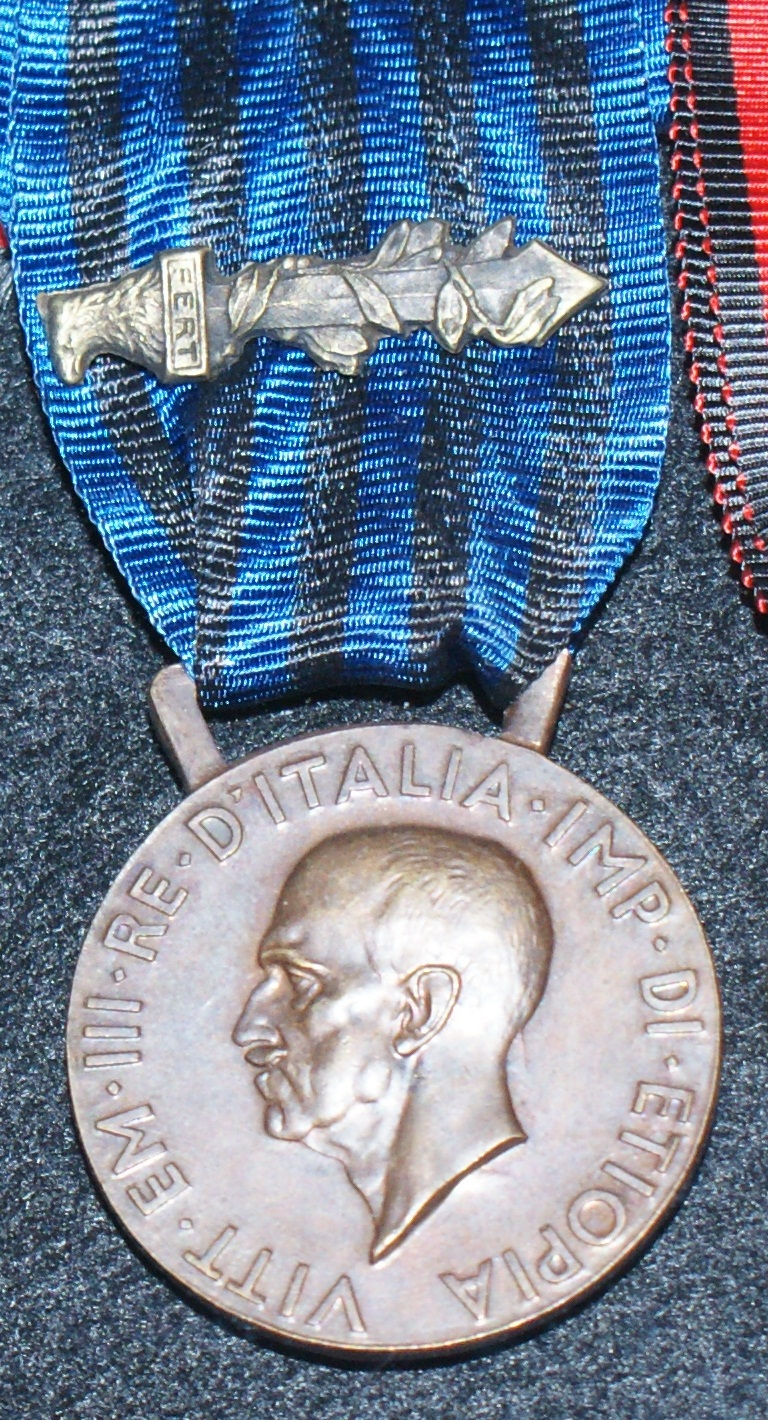
- The obverse of the medal with gladius clasp.
- Type: Commemorative medal
- Awarded for: Service in military operations in East Africa
- Presented by: Kingdom of Italy
- Eligibility: Military and civilian personnel
- Status: Abolished 15 December 2010
- Established: 27 April 1936 (effective 3 October 1935)
- Ribbon of the medal. Ribbon of the medal with gladius pin.

Precedence
- Next (higher): Badge of Honor for the "Volunteers of Freedom" Patriots
- Next (lower): Commemorative Medal of the African Campaigns

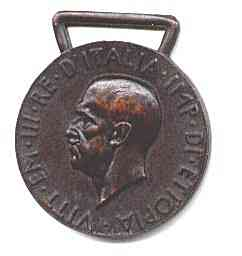
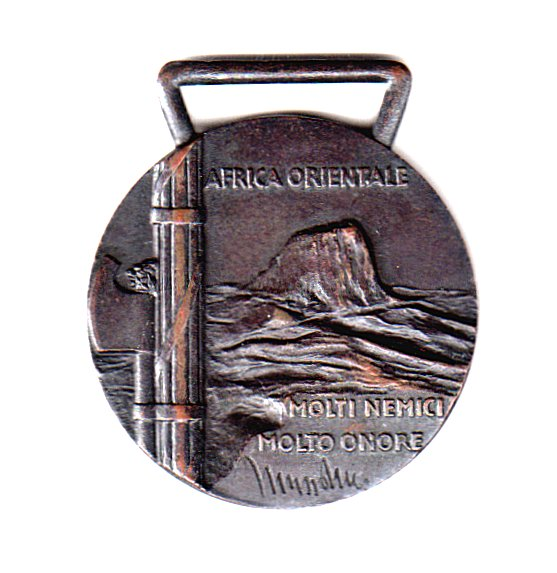
The obverse (left) and reverse of the medal..

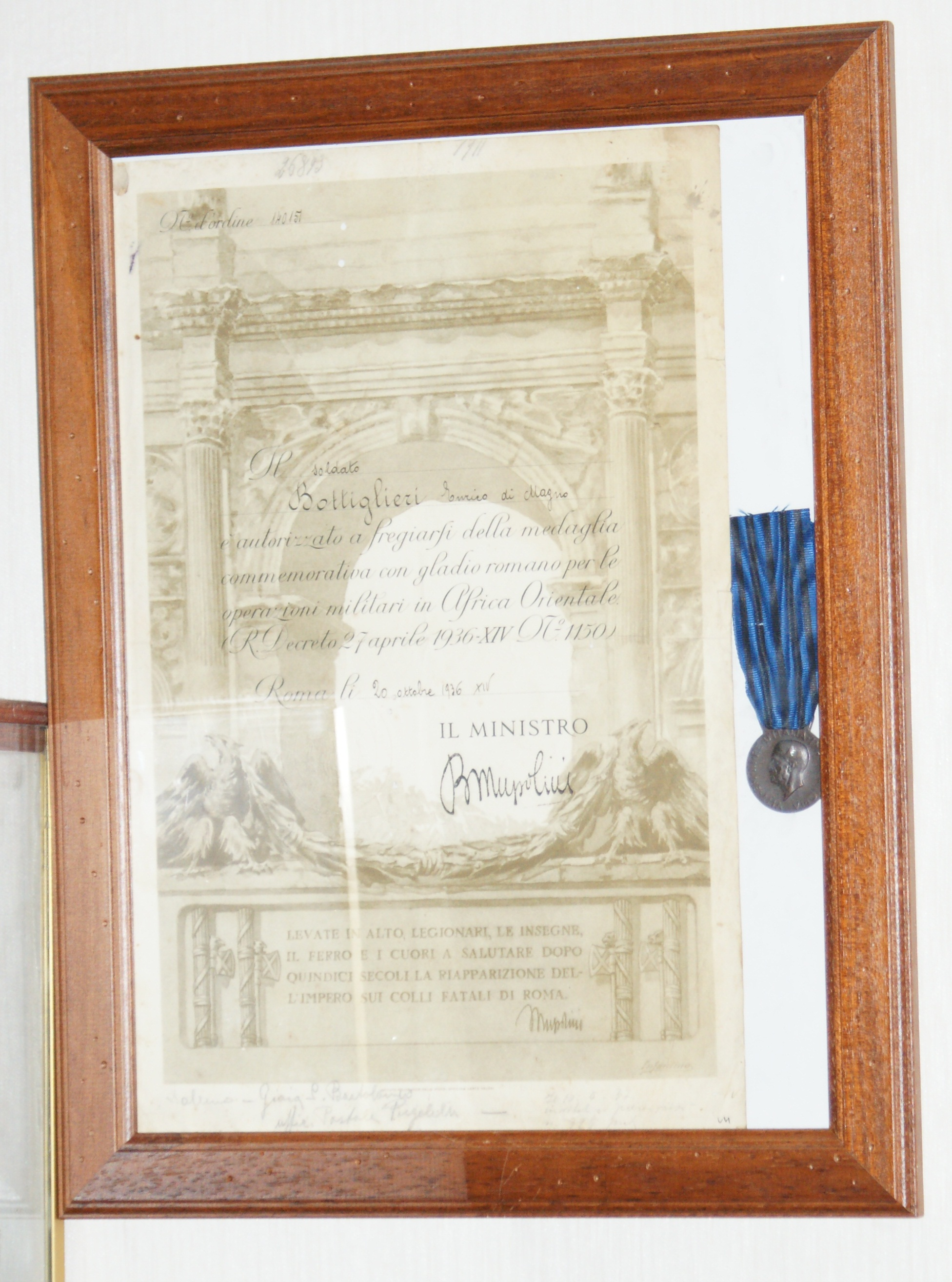
The diploma and medal.

The Commemorative Medal for Military Operations in East Africa (Italian: Medaglia commemorativa delle operazioni militari in Africa Orientale) was a decoration established in 1936 by the Kingdom of Italy for personnel who took part in Italian military operations in East Africa in 1935 and 1936, corresponding to major military operations during the Second Italo-Ethiopian War. The Italian Republic abolished the medal in 2010.

== History ==
King Victor Emmanuel III established the Commemorative Medal for Military Operations in East Africa with Royal Decree No. 1150 of 27 April 1936. Originally, recipients were permitted to affix a Roman gladius to the ribbon, but Royal Decree Number 1584 of 23 July 1936 rescinded the eligibility of recipients who served in non-combat roles to display the gladius.

Royal Decree No. 2463 of 10 May 1937 restored the display of the gladius for non-combat service. It also abolished the Medal in Memory of the Campaigns and Service Provided in the Italian Colonies of East Africa and in the Related Areas of Influence (Italian: :Medaglia a ricordo delle campagne e del servizio prestato nelle colonie italiane dell'Africa Orientale e nelle relative zone d'influenza) — known until 1923 as the Commemorative Medal of the African Campaigns (Italian: :Medaglia commemorativa delle campagne d'Africa) — without prejudice to the rights of those who already had been awarded the medal, and replaced it with the Commemorative Medal for Military Operations in East Africa, with effect backdated to 3 October 1935, the first day of the Second Italo-Ethiopian War.

Deeming the medal obsolete, the Italian Republic abolished it with Presidential Decree Number 248 on 15 December 2010.

== Eligibiity ==
Personnel who participated in Italian military operations in East Africa from 3 October 1935 (the first day of the Second Italo-Ethiopian War) to 1936 qualified for the medal. Originally only military personnel qualified for the award, but the 1937 decree extended eligibility to certain categories of civilians.

== Appearance ==
=== Medal ===
The medal consists of a bronze disc. The obverse depicts a portrait of King Victor Emmanuel III looking to the left with his head uncovered, with the inscription "VITT · EM · III · RE · D'ITALIA · IMP · DI · ETIOPIA" — an abbreviation of "Vittorio Emanuele III Re d'Italia Imperatore di Etiopia" ("Vittorio Emanuel III King of Italy Emperor of Ethiopia) — around the perimeter of the disc. The reverse depicts an East African scene of mountains and desert flanked on the left by a fasces. At the top is the inscription "AFRICA ORIENTALE" ("EAST AFRICA"). The motto "MOLTI NEMICI, MOLTO ONORE" ("MANY ENEMIES, MUCH HONOR") and the signature of Prime Minister Benito Mussolini lie below the scenery.

=== Ribbon ===
The ribbon has 11 stripes, with six blue stripes alternating with five black ones. A pin in the shape of a flaming gladius could be attached to the ribbon to recognize participation in active combat operations.

=== Clasps ===
Qualifying personnel could wear the gladius as a clasp on the ribbon from which the medal is suspended.
