= Volunteer Ribbon =

The Volunteer Ribbon
- The Volunteer Ribbon
- Type: Award for military service towards the establishment of the State of Israel
- Country: Israel
- Presented by: The State of Israel
- Campaigns: First World War; Second World War
- Established: 1961; 64 years ago

Order of wear
- Next (higher): Nili Ribbon
- Next (lower): Ribbon of The Haganah

The Volunteer Ribbon is an Israeli decoration that is awarded to World War I and World War II veterans.

== Award criteria ==
The ribbon is awarded to:

- All those who during World War I volunteered in the Jewish Legion.
- An Israeli citizen or a permanent resident of Israel, or those who during permanent residency in Palestine volunteered during World War I, to serve in the Turkish army according to the needs of the Yishuv's (the national Jewish institutions).
- Israeli citizens or permanent residents of Israel who volunteered for the British army during World War II before 8/11/1944. If they volunteered on 8/11/1944 or later, the condition is that they served for six consecutive months or more.
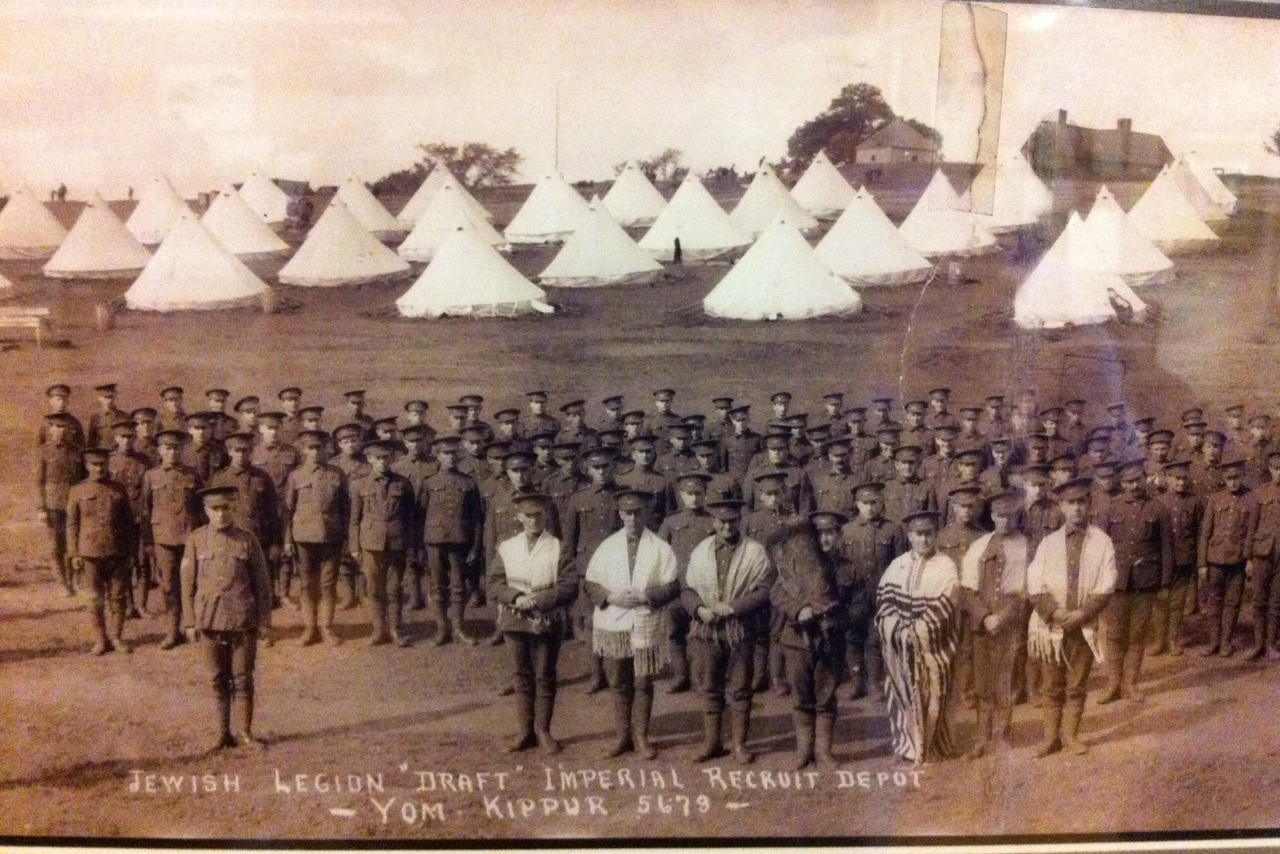
- 39th Battalion, Jewish Legion, at Fort Edward (Nova Scotia), Yom Kippur, 1918
  Citizens who volunteered during the Second World War are eligible for the Nazi Fighter ribbon for their engagement.

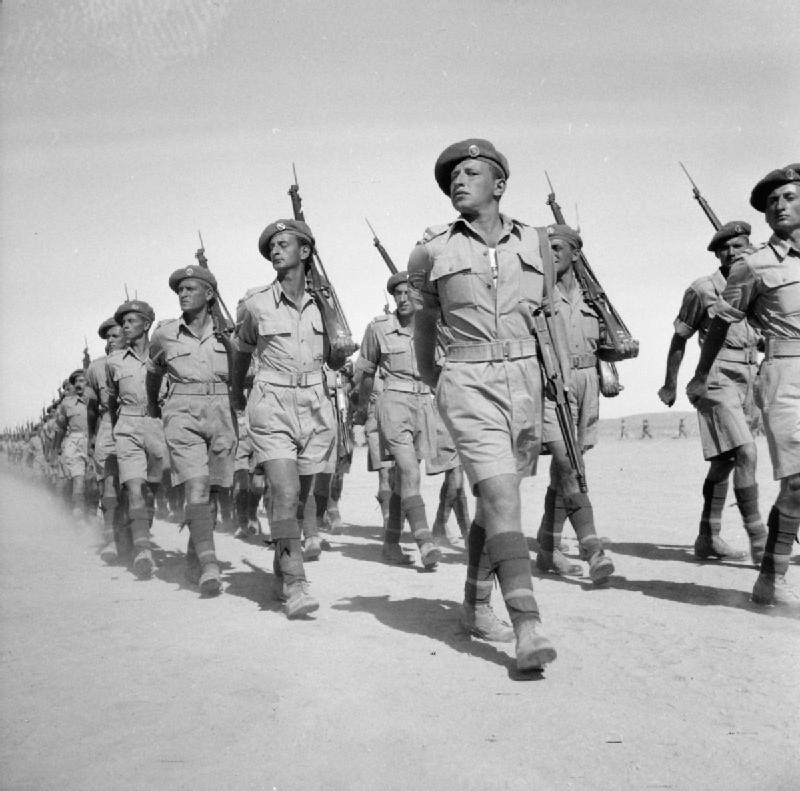
1st Battalion of the Jewish Brigade on parade Israeli veteran with medals and ribbons including The Volunteer Ribbon

If the person eligible for this award has died, a family member (a spouse, a son, a daughter, a father, a mother, a brother, a sister, a grandson, a granddaughter) is entitled to submit an application requesting the ribbon, or an equivalent to the ribbon in event of loss or wear and tear.

== Design ==
Ribbon

The ribbon's central stripe shows the flag of Israel with red, orange and green stripes on either side.

== See also ==
- List of military awards of World War II
- Israeli military decorations
- War of Independence Ribbon
- Fighters against Nazis Medal
