= Fighters against Nazis Medal =

The Fighters against Nazis Medal
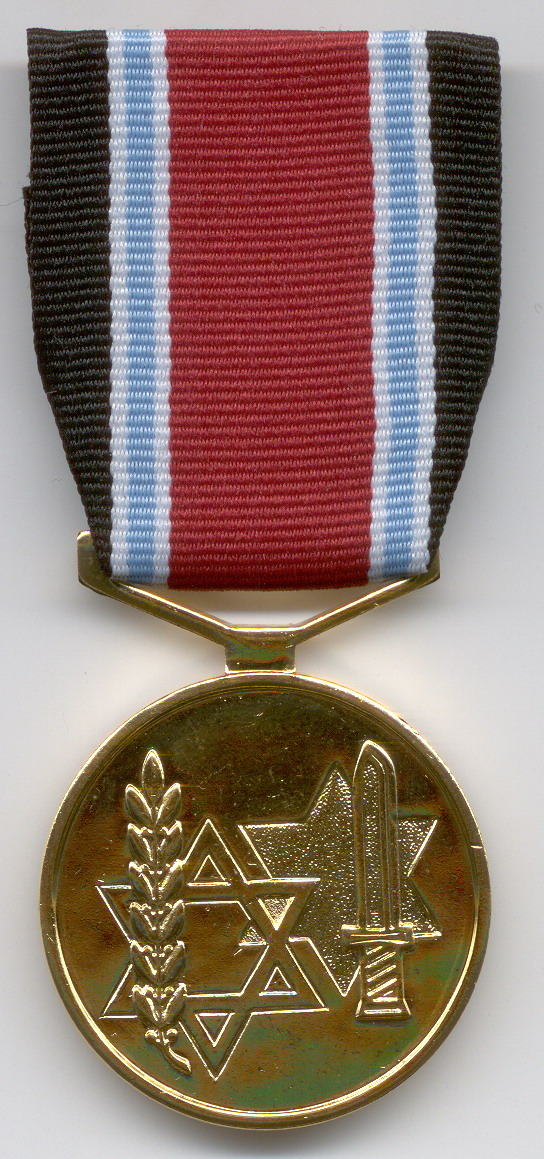
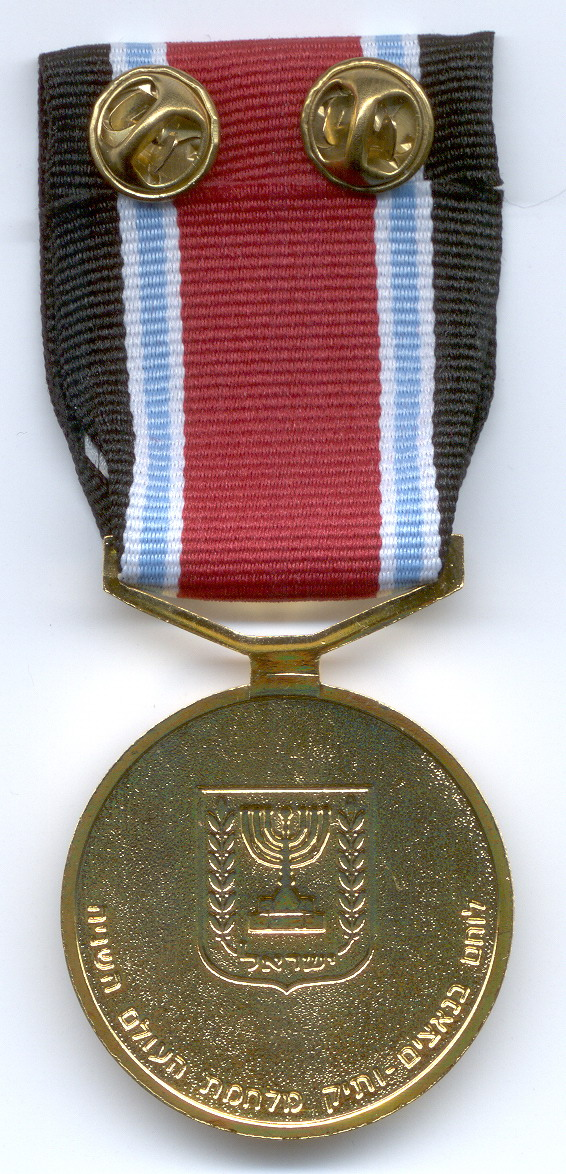
- Obverse and reverse of the medal.
- Type: Award for military service towards the establishment of the State of Israel
- Awarded for: Serving in the Second World War
- Country: Israel
- Presented by: Yad Vashem, Israel
- Eligibility: Israeli citizens or permanent residents in Israel who served in any of the allied armed forces or as partisans or members of underground resistance groups between 1 September 1939 and 1 September 1946.
- Campaign: Second World War
- Status: Awarded as necessary
- Established: As a ribbon: 1967; 59 years ago As a medal: 2000; 26 years ago
- First award: As a ribbon: 7/5/1967; As a medal: 2000
- Ribbon bar

Order of wear
- Next (higher): Irgun (ETZEL) Ribbon
- Next (lower): Stern Gang (LEHI) Ribbon

Fighters against Nazis Medal (Hebrew: אות הלוחם בנאצים, romanized: Ot Halohem BaNatzim) is an Israeli decoration that is awarded to World War II veterans.

First instituted as a ribbon bar in 1967, it was first awarded to World War II veterans at Yom HaShoah (7 May) the same year by the Prime Minister of Israel, Levi Eshkol.

In 1985 to mark 40 years to victory in World War II, an Israeli flag with the ribbon bar was awarded to a number of museums dedicated to the war.

In 2000, a medal was created from the ribbon bar.

== Award criteria ==
An Israeli citizen or permanent resident of Israel who during World War II was engaged in the military campaign against the Nazi oppressors and their supporters and fought them in one of the Allies armed forces, including the British brigade, as a partisan or as an underground movement member during the set period of time which is between 1/9/1939 and the 1/9/1945, as specified by Yad Vashem regulation of 1968, and also based upon the "status of the World War II veterans" Act of 2000.

If the person eligible for this award has died, a family member (a spouse, a son, a daughter, a father, a mother, a brother, a sister, a grandson, a granddaughter) is entitled to submit an application requesting the ribbon, or an equivalent to the ribbon in event of loss or wear and tear.

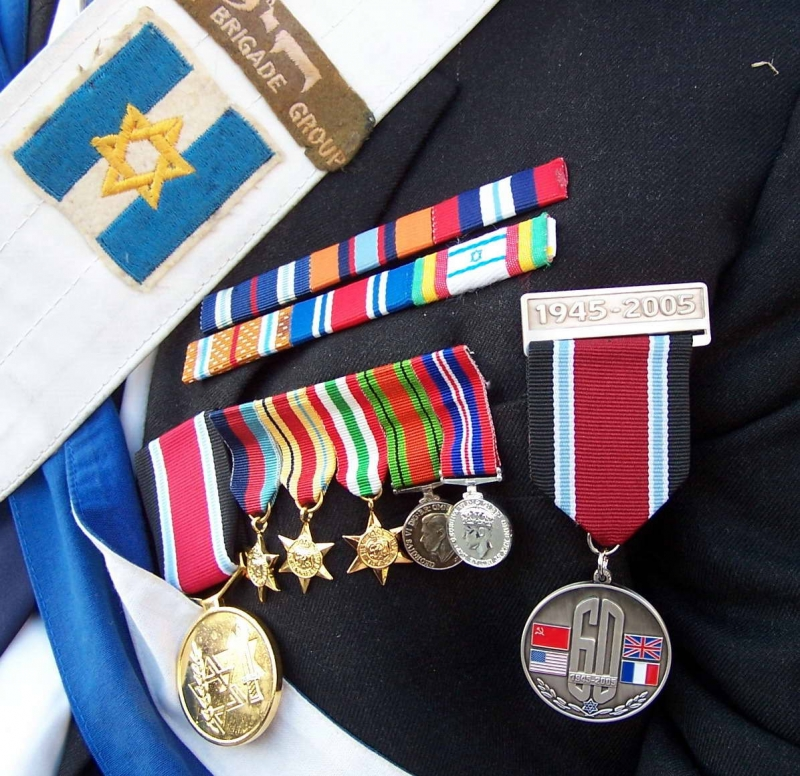
Israeli veteran with medals and ribbons including the Fighters against Nazis medal

== Design ==
The Fighters against Nazis Medal is a disc. The non-swivelling straight bar suspender is attached to the medal at the top of the medal. The medals were struck on a gold coloured metal.

Obverse

The obverse shows two Stars of David; one of them is shaped as a Yellow badge and has a bayonet on it while the other has an olive branch on it.

Reverse

The reverse shows the Emblem of the State of Israel, a menorah surrounded by an olive branch on each side, and the writing "ישראל" (Hebrew for Israel) below it, in the centre; around it the writing "לוחם בנאצים - ותיק מלחמת העולם השנייה" (Hebrew for Fighter against the Nazis - veteran of World War II).

Ribbon

The ribbon is red in the centre with a stripe made up of a light blue stripe sounded on both sides by a white strip on each side symbolising the flag of Israel; there are also two black stripes along the edges of the ribbon. This design was made to be nearly identical to the ribbon of the 1939 Iron Cross awarded in World War II.

== See also ==
- War of Independence Ribbon
- The Volunteer Ribbon
- Israeli military decorations
- List of military awards of World War II
