= Commemorative Medal of the Spanish Campaign =

Italian military award

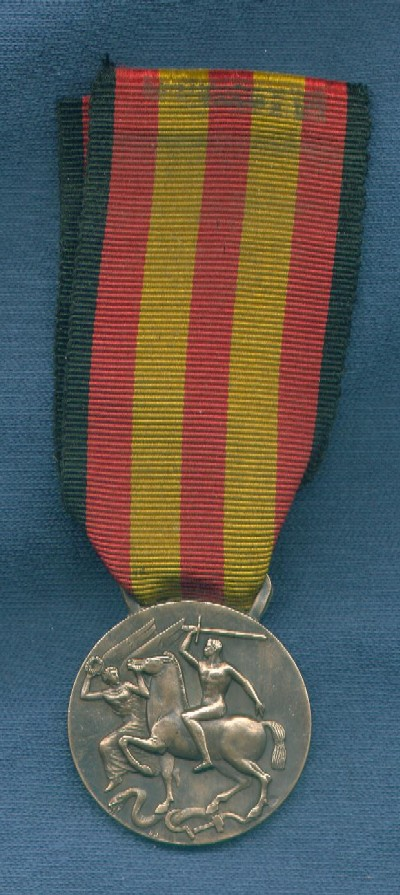
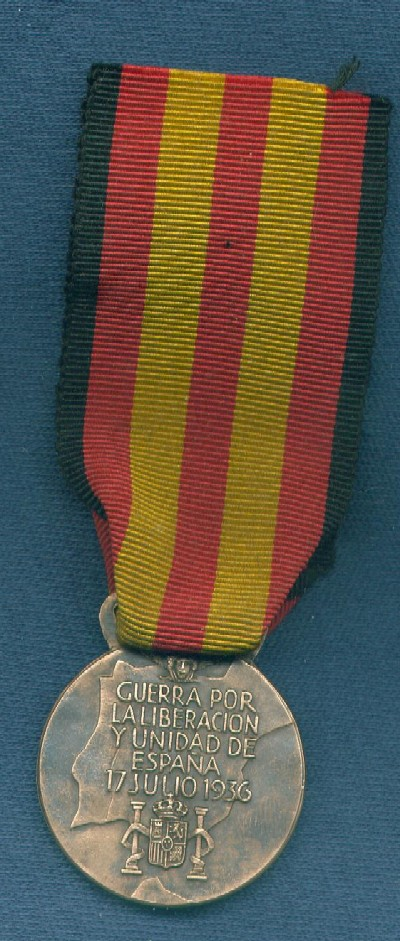
- The obverse (left) and reverse of the medal
- Type: Commemorative medal
- Awarded for: Service during the Italian intervention in the Spanish Civil War
- Presented by: Fascist Italy
- Eligibility: Military and civilian personnel
- Status: Abolished 13 December 2010
- Established: 6 June 1940
- Ribbon of the medal

Precedence
- Next (higher): Commemorative Medal of the African Campaigns
- Next (lower): Commemorative Medal of the War Period 1940-43

The Commemorative Medal of the Spanish Campaign (Italian: Medaglia commemorativa della campagna di Spagna) was a decoration awarded by the Kingdom of Italy during its period of Fascist rule under Prime Minister Benito Mussolini to personnel who took part in the Italian military intervention in Spain during the Spanish Civil War of 1936–1939.

== History ==
King Victor Emmanuel III established the Commemorative Medal of the Spanish Campaign with Royal Decree Number 1244 of 6 June 1940.

After deeming it obsolete, the Italian Republic abolished the medal with Presidential Decree Number 248 on 13 December 2010.

== Eligibiity ==
Eligibility for the award extended to:

- Personnel of the Corpo Truppe Volontarie ("Corps of Volunteer Troops") who served for at least three months in operational units in Spain.
- Personnel of the Regia Aeronautica ("Royal Air Force") who took part in at least three flight actions of the Aviazione Legionaria ("Legionary Air Force").
- Personnel of the Regia Marina ('Royal Navy") who served at least three months aboard ship in support of the interventiom.
- Italian volunteers of the Tercio de Extranjeros ("Tercio of Foreigners") who served in Spain for at least three months.
- Merchant mariners who provided services connected to the intervention.
- Airline employees who provided services connected to the intervention.

== Appearance ==
=== Medal ===
The medal consists of a bronze disc with a diameter of 33 millimetres (1.3 in) and a hook attachment.

The obverse depicts a naked knight brandishing a sword and riding a steed trampling a serpent and a hammer and sickle. The horse is led by a winged victory who holds a laurel wreath on his right.

The reverse depicts a slight relief of the Iberian Peninsula and the tip of Ceuta. Superimposed on the peninsula is the inscription Guerra Por La Liberation Y Unidad De Espagna 17 Julio 1936 ("War for the Liberation and Unity of Spain 17 July 1936"). The head of a winged medusa is on the upper edge above the inscription. Below the inscription is the symbol of the Kingdom of Spain, consisting of the royal coat of arms of Spain between the Pillars of Hercules wrapped in a cartouche.

=== Ribbon ===
The 37-millimetre (1.46 in) ribbon has seven vertical lines. Two 3-millimetre (0.12 in) black lines, on the left and right edges, symbolize Italian fascism. Between the black lines are five lines — three 6-millimetre (0.24 in) red lines alternating with two 6.5-millimetre (0.26 in) yellow lines — in the colors of the flag of Spain.
