= Commemorative Medal of the War of Liberation =

Italian military award

Badge of the Ongoing War of Liberation Against the Germans
- Type: Commemorative medal
- Awarded for: Service during the Italian campaign and Italian Civil War (1943–1945)
- Presented by: Kingdom of Italy
- Eligibility: Military personnel, partisans, and civilians of the Italian resistance and Co-belligerent Forces
- Status: Replaced 17 November 1948
- Established: 21 April 1945

Precedence
- Next (higher): Commemorative Medal of the War Period 1940-43
- Next (lower): Commemorative Medal of the Expedition to Albania

Liberation War Badge
- Type: Commemorative medal
- Awarded for: Service during the Italian campaign and Italian Civil War (1943–1945)
- Presented by: Italian Republic
- Eligibility: Military personnel, partisans, and civilians of the Italian resistance and Co-belligerent Forces
- Status: Replaced 6 May 1959
- Established: 17 November 1948

Precedence
- Next (higher): Commemorative Medal of the War Period 1940-43
- Next (lower): Commemorative Medal of the Expedition to Albania

Commemorative Medal of the War of Liberation
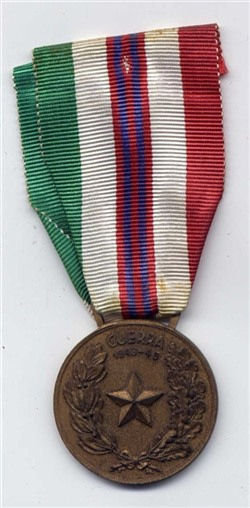
- The obverse of the medal.
- Type: Commemorative medal
- Awarded for: Service during the Italian campaign and Italian Civil War (1943–1945)
- Presented by: Italian Republic
- Eligibility: Military personnel, partisans, and civilians of the Italian resistance and Co-belligerent Forces
- Established: 6 May 1959
- Ribbon of the medal

Precedence
- Next (higher): Commemorative Medal of the War Period 1940-43
- Next (lower): Commemorative Medal of the Expedition to Albania

The Commemorative Medal of the War of Liberation (Italian: Medaglia commemorativa della guerra di liberazione) is a decoration awarded by the Italian Republic to personnel who participated in military and partisan operations of the Italian co-belligerent forces or the Italian resistance movement against the Axis powers during the Italian campaign of World War II and the coincident Italian Civil War. It originated in 1945 as the Kingdom of Italy's Badge of the Ongoing War of Liberation Against the Germans (Italian: Distintivo della guerra di liberazione in corso contro i tedeschi), which the Italian Republic replaced with the Liberation War Badge (Italian: Distintivo della guerra di liberazione) in 1948. In turn, the Commemorative Medal of the War of Liberation replaced the Liberation War Badge in 1959.

== History ==
Fascist Italy – the Kingdom of Italy under Prime Minister Benito Mussolini – entered World War II on the side of the Axis powers in June 1940. On 9 September 1943, Italy surrendered to the Allies, and the Kingdom of Italy, which controlled southern Italy, switched to the Allied side, entering a status of co-belligerence with them, its armed forces becoming known as the Italian Co-belligerent Army, Italian Co-belligerent Air Force, and Italian Co-belligerent Navy. In response, Nazi Germany forcibly occupied the rest of Italy and installed Mussolini as the leader of the Italian Social Republic in northern Italy, which continued the war on the Axis side. An Italian resistance movement arose to combat the German occupation and the Italian Social Republic. These events resulted between 1943 and 1945 in the Kingdom of Italy's co-belligerent forces participating in Allied operations against German and Italian Social Republic forces during the Italian campaign, guerrilla actions by the Italian resistance against German forces, and a simultaneous Italian Civil War pitting the Italian co-belligerent and resistance forces against those of the Italian Social Republic. The collective military and guerrilla actions by Italian co-belligerent and resistance forces against Germany and the Italian Social Republic between 1943 and 1945 became known in Italy as the "War of Liberation."

With the war still underway, the Ministry of War of the Kingdom of Italy created the Badge of the Ongoing War of Liberation Against the Germans with Circular Number 182, issued on 21 April 1945. It made all personnel who participated in the war of liberation against the Axis forces between 9 September 1943 and the German surrender eligible for the badge. Germany surrendered 17 days later, on 8 May 1945.

The Italian Republic replaced the Kingdom of Italy in 1946. On 17 November 1948, with Presidential Decree Number 1590, the Italian Republic replaced the Badge of the Ongoing War of Liberation Against the Germans with the Liberation War Badge, exclusively honorific in nature. With Law Number 390 of 24 May 1950, the Italian Republic extended eligibility to personnel involved in clearing explosive devices between the end of World War II and 16 April 1946.

By Presidential Decree Number 399 of 6 May 1959, the Italian Republic transformed the Liberation War Badge into the Commemorative Medal of the War of Liberation.

== Eligibiity ==
Eligibility for any of the three awards extended to:

- Personnel of the Italian Armed Forces who fought in the Co-belligent Army, Co-belligerent Air Force, or Co-belligerent Navy
- Personnel of the Guardia di Finanza (Financial Police)
- Personnel of the Italian Red Cross
- Personnel of the Sovereign Military Order of Malta
- Assimilated and civilian personnel following the armed forces

who during the period of the War of Liberation (9 September 1943 – 8 May 1945) met at least one of the following criteria:

- Died in combat
- Served for at least three months, consecutively or non-consecutively, either while in the employ of the armed forces of the Kingdom of Italy, after mobilization by their respective general staffs, or, if assimilated or civilian, while following the armed forces
- Suffered wounds or contracted illnesses identified as specifically resulting from war-related actions
- Honorably participated in an important military event
- Received the Gold Medal of Military Valor, Silver Medal of Military Valor, Bronze Medal of Military Valor, or War Merit Cross for actions against the Germans either prior to the Italian declaration of war on Germany on 13 October 1943 or during the War of Liberation

Additional eligibility for any of the three awards extended to:

- Personnel given the qualification of "fighting partisan"
- Military personnel and militarized civilians who between the end of the war and 16 April 1946 took part for at least three months, consecutively or non-consecutively, in the postwar clearance of land mines, bombs, and other explosive devices

Upon request of interested parties, Italian authorities also can grant a special authorization to wear the award by issuing a certificate of nomination indicated for this purpose by the Italian Minister of Defence.

In 1948, Presidential Decree Number 1590 also established the Badge of the 1940–1943 War Period, which recognized service to Fascist Italy during World War II between 1940 and 1943, and in 1959 Presidential Decree Number 399 also transformed that badge into a medal, the Commemorative Medal of the War Period 1940–43. Personnel may qualify for the Badge of the 1940–1943 War Period or the Commemorative Medal of the War Period 1940–43 as well as for the Liberation War Badge or the Commemorative Medal of the War of Liberation. Thus, qualifying Italian personnel are authorized to wear awards recognizing service on both the Axis and Allied sides during the war.

== Appearance ==
=== Badge of the Ongoing War of Liberation Against the Germans and Liberation War Badge ===
The Badge of the Ongoing War of Liberation Against the Germans and the Liberation War Badge were identical. In each case, the badge consists of a 37-millimetre (1.46 in) wide silk ribbon, made up of the colors of the flag of Italy with an 8-millimetre (0.31 in) wide green stripe on the left, an 8-millimetre (0.31 in) red stripe on the right, and a 21-millimetre (0.83 in) wide white stripe between them. In the center are five vertical stripes, each 1 millimetre (0.04 in) wide, with the colors characteristic of the United Kingdom and the United States, arranged as three red stripes alternating with two blue ones.

Burnished stars are affixed to each badge to recognize years of service. A badge with no stars indicates less than a year of service, and each star, to a maximum for four, indicates a full year of service.

Ribbons
Less than one year of campaign	One year of campaign	Two years of campaign	Three years of campaign	Four years of campaign

=== Commemorative Medal of the War of Liberation ===
==== Medal ====
The obverse features the goddess Roma as carved on the Tomb of the Unknown Soldier in Rome. The reverse has a five-pointed star at its center, encircled around the perimeter in the form of an open crown by a laurel branch on left and an oak branch on the right, rather than the laurel wreath around the entire perimeter prescribed by the award's 1959 founding decree. The laurel branch and oak branch are tied with a ribbon at the bottom. At the top are the words "Guerra 1943–45" ("War 1943–45"), and at the bottom is the letter "Z."

==== Ribbon ====
The medal's ribbon is identical to the badges. In the same manner as on the badges, burnished stars indicate complete years of service.

==== Clasps ====
Clasps are attached to the silk ribbon from which the medal is suspended indicating the campaign years in which the wearer participated in the War of Liberation. One clasp is attached for each year, i.e., "1943," "1944," "1945," and "1946."

==== Wear ====
The medal is worn on the left side of the chest.
