= Battle of Segheneyti =

Battle between the Kingdom of Italy and Ethiopian Empire in 1888

- Part of Italo-Ethiopian War of 1887–1889
Date	8 August 1888
Location	Segeneiti, Ethiopian Empire (present-day Eritrea)
Result	Ethiopian victory

Belligerents
Kingdom of Italy	Irregulars under Dejazmatch Debeb

Commanders and leaders
Captain Tullio Cornacchia †	Dejazmatch Debeb Araya

Strength
700–800	Thousands

Casualties and losses
200–300 Askaris and five Italian officers.	Unknown

The Battle of Segheneyti, or Saganèiti, was a small clash fought on August 8, 1888 between the troops of the Kingdom of Italy and Abyssinian irregulars towards the end of the Italo-Ethiopian War of 1887–1889. The Dejazmatch Debeb, who had previously betrayed the Ethiopian Empire, turned against the Italians. The battle resulted in the destruction of an Italian attachment that was deployed to Segheneyti. Five Italian officers and c.250 Askaris died in the action.

== Battle ==
In July 1888, the troops of General Antonio Baldissera began operations to extend Italian possessions in Eritrea, starting from the already acquired Massawa they targeted the plateau cities of Keren and Asmara. During this phase, the Italians faced the problem of a local leader, Debeb, who close to Ras Alula and previously in their service. Debeb and his irregulars had deserted in March 1888, after the troops of General San Marzano had led raids against the tribes which submitted to the Italians.

The task of capturing Debeb and dispersing his band was entrusted by Baldissera to captain Cornacchia, who headed a contingent of 400 "bashi-bazouk", 300 local irregulars and four Italian officers. The contingent departed from Ua-a on 4 August 1889, to the village of Segeneiti, where, according to the spies, Debeb's camp was located.

The attack on Debeb was supposed to be a surprise, but this plan failed because it took longer than anticipated for Italian troops to reach Segheneyti, giving Ethiopian forces enough time to be made aware of the attack. When Italian forces finally arrived on August 8, 1888, the Italian contingent occupied Segheneyti, but Debeb was not found there, having been warned in time, and had fled the village to stand with his troops on the nearby heights. From there, Debeb's superior forces ambushed the Cornish column; after killing the captain and other Italian officers, the contingent disbanded and retreated to Massawa, leaving about 200 casualties on the field.

== Aftermath ==
The defeat, though minor, drew heavy criticism towards Baldissera; In response, the general offered his resignation, which was rejected by the prime minister Francesco Crispi, who reaffirmed his confidence in the general's work. "The first group of askari was formed in October 1888, after the débacle of the basci-buzuk at Saganeiti, seen almost as a second Dogali, where all the Italian officers died while the 800 irregulars fled, followed by Debeb's men who killed around three hundred of them."

In the Italian army, the skirmish was considered a "massacre" - while most irregular Italian-aligned forces (referred to as basci-buzuk) fled, all Italian officers had been slain. The defeat at Segheyneyti prompted Italian command to reform their army organization - in October 1888, the first group of askari was formed to replace the basci-buzuk. After Italian forces took Segheneyti later in 1888, the local Coptic church in Segheneyti was destroyed and a new Catholic one was erected in its place to honour Cornacchia.

The battle had a profound impact of Italian strategy in Ethiopia and its approach towards indigenous troops. In early 1888, indigenous troops were hailed by Italian command as fighters that could "run some tens of kilometers without water, food or rest, that they could subsist on only a ‘fistful’ of wheat per day, and that they were responsible for their own provisioning". Italy would steadily increase its dependence on irregular native troops, and send Italian forces back to Europe. The defeat at Segheneyti forced Italy to reconsider its strategy. Italian public initially blamed the defeat on indigenous fighters themselves, with Italian newspapers condemning indigenous troops as disloyal and treacherous. However, Italian commanders argued that "indigenous troops sent to Saganeiti had shown a willingness to fight so long as their Italian officers were still alive". From that point, native troops were reformed to be more organized and better equipped, and went through Italian led training; lastly, more Italian officers were assigned to them.

== Fallen Italian officers at Segheneyti ==
- Captain Tullio Cornacchia
- Lieutenant Marcello Brero
- Lieutenant Umberto Poli
- Lieutenant Giulio Viganò
- Lieutenant Virginio Virgini

All five officers were decorated with the Silver Medal of Military Valor

== See also ==
- Battle of Dogali
- First Italo-Ethiopian War
