= Orders, decorations, and medals of Israel =

Orders, decorations and medals

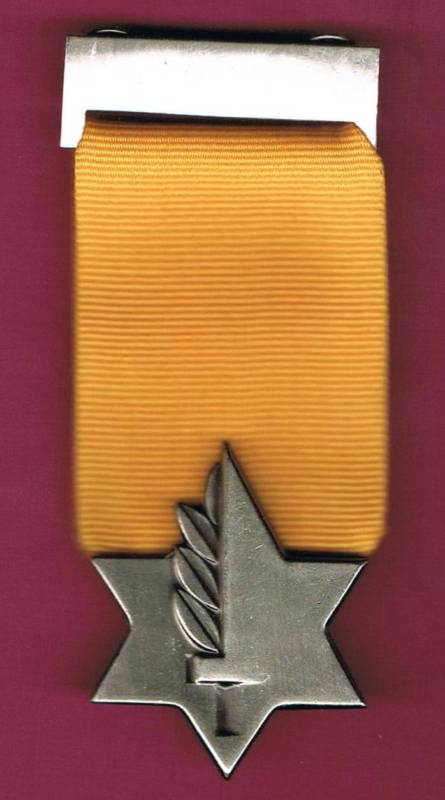
Israel's medal of valor

Israeli military decorations are the decorations awarded to soldiers in the Israel Defense Forces who exhibit extraordinary bravery and courage. Its decorations consist of the Medal of Valor (the highest decoration in the IDF), the Medal of Courage, and the Medal of Distinguished Service. It also includes the Citations (Tzalash), which are awarded in four classes.

Two soldiers share the title of being the most decorated soldier of the IDF: Captain Nechemya Cohen (1943–1967), and General Ehud Barak (formerly Chief of Staff, later Prime Minister).

== Decorations ==
Medal of Valor (The highest decoration)
Medal of Courage
Medal of Distinguished Service
Hero of Israel Ribbon (1948) (obsolete)

== Citations (Tzalash) ==
Citations are worn on the campaign ribbon when awarded in times of war.

Chief of Staff (Ramatkal) Citation
Head of Regional Command (Aluf) Citation
Divisional Commander Citation
Brigade Commander Citation

== Campaign ribbons, medal and Badge ==
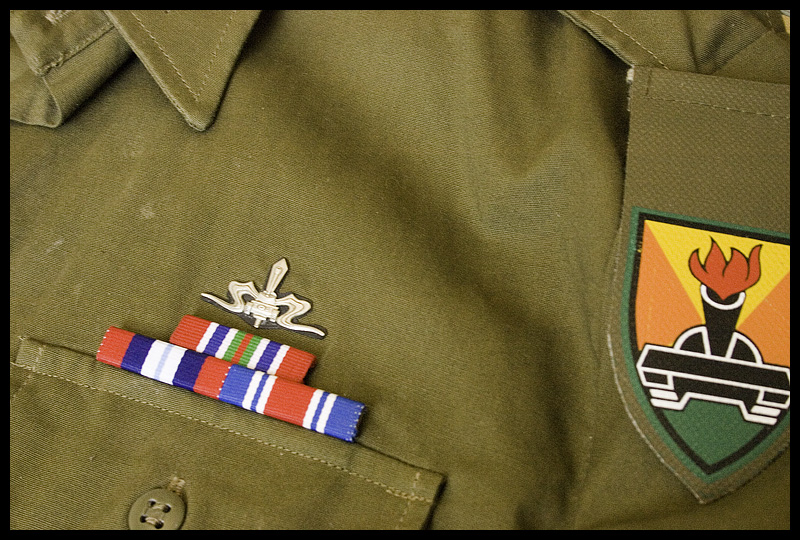

According to Israel Ministry of Defence, "'Campaign ribbons' are ribbons commemorating a person's participation in war, campaign and combat from the establishment of the State of Israel up to the present day. These ribbons are awarded by authorisation of government, the IDF decorations Act and regulations set up by the Minister of Defense."

War of Independence Ribbon
Sinai War Ribbon
Six-Day War Ribbon
War of Attrition Ribbon
Yom Kippur War Ribbon
First Lebanon War Ribbon
Security Zone in Lebanon Ribbon
Second Lebanon War Ribbon
Protective Edge Ribbon
Defence of Jerusalem Badge
Katamon Medal (1948) (obsolete)

== Awards for military service ==
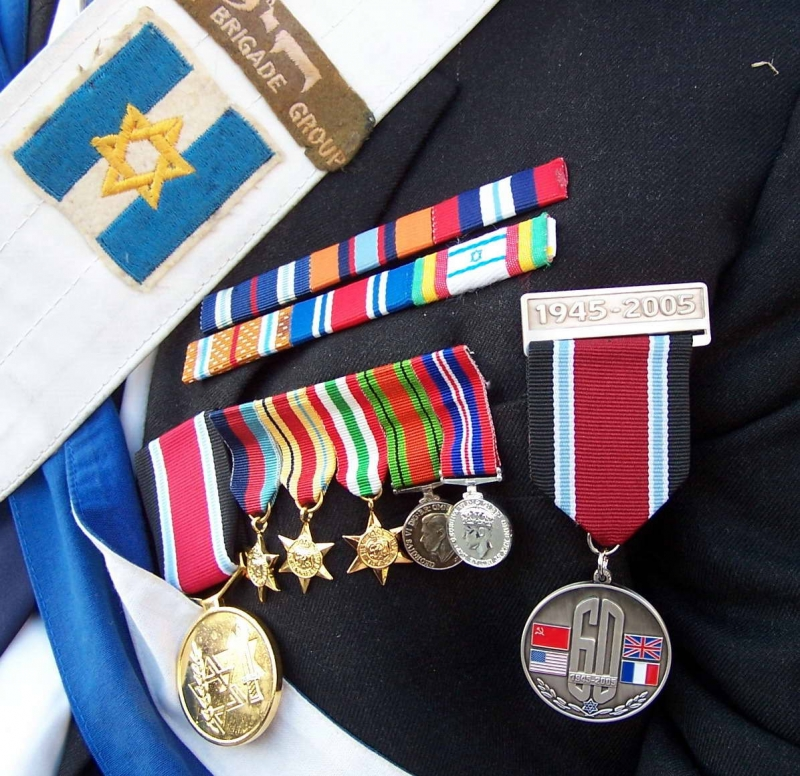

According to Israel Ministry of Defence, "'Awards for military contribution towards the establishment of the State of Israel' and decorations are awarded by authorisation of government and a ministerial committee for symbols and ceremonies, with the exception of the Nazi Fighter Ribbon which is awarded according to the 'Yad Vashem' regulation in the Remembrance and Holocaust Act, and in addition by the 'status of the Second World War II' Act of 2000."

Hashomer Ribbon
Nili Ribbon
The Volunteer Ribbon
Haganah Ribbon
Mishmar Ribbon
Etzel Ribbon
Fighters against Nazis Medal
Lehi Ribbon

== Other medals, awards and ribbons ==
Eliyahu Golomb Israel Security Award (right side decoration (highest possible award)
Mandate Prisoners Decoration (right side decoration)
IDF Chief of Staff Medal of Appreciation
Service in Israel Medal
Decoration of State Warriors (ribbon device)
