= Service in Israel Medal =

Service in Israel Medal אות השירות בישראל
- Ribbon
- Type: Military decoration
- Awarded for: 2+ years of service in Israel
- Presented by: Israel Defense Forces
- Eligibility: Foreign military attachés
- Status: Currently awarded
- Established: 2007; 19 years ago

The Service in Israel Medal (Hebrew: אות השירות בישראל) is an Israeli military decoration.

The medal is awarded to foreign military attachés in Israel upon the end of their posting. The criteria for the awarding of the decoration is a service of at least two years in Israel.

In an event that the medal recipient violated Israeli law, hurt its security and/or insulted Israel or the Jewish people the decoration would be withheld.

The medal was instituted on January 12, 2007 by a decision of the government of Israel, the medal was created due to numbers of requests by foreign military attachés who complain they receive no decoration for their time of service in Israel.

== Design ==
The medal is shaped like the IDF coat of arms but instead of the Hebrew writing the initials "IDF" are written in English.

The medal is attached to a white ribbon with two blue strips of the edges similar to the design of the flag of Israel.
