= Commemorative Medal of the War Period 1940–43 =

Italian military award

Badge of the 1940–43 War Period
- Type: Commemorative medal
- Awarded for: Service during World War II between June 1940 and September 1943
- Presented by: Fascist Italy
- Eligibility: Military and civilian personnel
- Status: Replaced 17 November 1948
- Established: 4 November 1941

Precedence
- Next (higher): Commemorative Medal of the Spanish Campaign
- Next (lower): Commemorative Medal of the War of Liberation

Badge of the 1940–43 War Period
- Type: Commemorative medal
- Awarded for: Service during World War II between June 1940 and September 1943
- Presented by: Italian Republic
- Eligibility: Military and civilian personnel
- Status: Replaced 6 May 1959
- Established: 17 November 1948

Precedence
- Next (higher): Commemorative Medal of the Spanish Campaign
- Next (lower): Commemorative Medal of the War of Liberation

Commemorative Medal of the War Period 1940-43
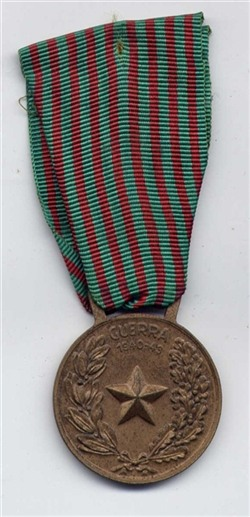
- The obverse of the medal.
- Type: Commemorative medal
- Awarded for: Service during World War II between June 1940 and September 1943
- Presented by: Italian Republic
- Eligibility: Military and civilian personnel
- Established: 6 May 1959
- Ribbon of the medal

Precedence
- Next (higher): Commemorative Medal of the Spanish Campaign
- Next (lower): Commemorative Medal of the War of Liberation

The Commemorative Medal of the War Period 1940–43 (Italian: Medaglia commemorativa del periodo bellico 1940-43) is a decoration awarded by the Italian Republic to personnel who served in the Italian Armed Forces or certain civilian entities of the Government of Italy during Fascist Italy's participation in World War II on the side of the Axis powers between 1940 and 1943. It originated in 1941 as Fascist Italy's Badge of the 1940–1943 War Period (Italian: Distintivo del periodo bellico 1940-43), which the Italian Republic replaced with an identical badge of the same name in 1948. In turn, the Commemorative Medal of the War Period 1940–43 replaced the Badge of the 1940–1943 War Period in 1959.

== History ==
Fascist Italy – the Kingdom of Italy under Prime Minister Benito Mussolini – entered World War II on the side of the Axis powers in June 1940. In Circular Number 91700, the Italian Ministry of War established what later became known as the Badge of the 1940–1943 War Period on 4 November 1941 to recognize service in the war.

On 9 September 1943, Italy surrendered to the Allies, and the Kingdom of Italy switched to the Allied side. World War II ended in 1945, and the Italian Republic replaced the kingdom in 1946. On 17 November 1948, with Presidential Decree Number 1590, the Italian Republic replaced the Fascist-era Badge of the 1940–1943 War Period with its own badge of the same name, exclusively honorific in nature.

By Presidential Decree Number 399 of 6 May 1959, the Italian Republic transformed the Badge of the 1940–1943 War Period into the Commemorative Medal of the War Period 1940–43.

== Eligibility ==
Eligibility for any of the three awards extended to:

- Personnel of the Italian Armed Forces
- Personnel of the Guardia di Finanza ("Financial Police")
- Personnel of the Italian Red Cross
- Personnel of the Sovereign Military Order of Malta
- Assimilated and civilian personnel following the armed forces

who during the period of Italy's participation in World War II on the Axis side (defined as from 11 June 1940 to 8:00 p.m. on 8 September 1943) met at least one of the following criteria:

- Died in combat
- Served for at least three months, consecutively or non-consecutively, in the employ of entities of the State
- Suffered wounds or contracted illnesses identified as specifically resulting from war-related actions
- Honorably participated in an important military event
- Received the Gold Medal of Military Valor, Silver Medal of Military Valor, Bronze Medal of Military Valor, or War Merit Cross

Upon request of interested parties, Italian authorities also can grant a special authorization to wear the award by issuing a certificate of nomination indicated for this purpose by the Italian Minister of Defence.

In 1948, Presidential Decree Number 1590 also established the Liberation War Badge, which recognized World War II service to the Kingdom of Italy after it switched sides and joined the Allies, and in 1959 Presidential Decree Number 399 also transformed that badge into a medal, the Commemorative Medal of the War of Liberation. Personnel may qualify for the Liberation War Badge or the Commemorative Medal of the War of Liberation as well as for the Badge of the 1940–1943 War Period or the Commemorative Medal of the War Period 1940–43. Thus, qualifying Italian personnel are authorized to wear awards recognizing service on both the Axis and Allied sides during the war.

== Appearance ==
=== Badge of the 1940–1943 War Period ===
The Badge of the 1940–1943 War Period the Fascist government authorized in 1941 and its successor of the same name, which the Italian Republic established in 1948, were identical in appearance. In each case, the badge consists of a 37-millimetre (1.46 in) wide silk ribbon, made up of 17 alternating green and red lines – nine green and eight red – with the two outermost lines green.

Burnished stars are affixed to the badge to recognize years of service. A badge with no stars indicates less than a year of service, and each star, to a maximum for four, indicates a full year of service.

Ribbons
Less than one year of campaign	One year of campaign	Two years of campaign	Three years of campaign	Four years of campaign

=== Commemorative Medal of the War Period 1940-43 ===
==== Medal ====
The obverse features the goddess Roma as carved on the Tomb of the Unknown Soldier in Rome. The reverse has a five-pointed star at its center, encircled around the perimeter in the form of an open crown by a laurel branch on left and an oak branch on the right. The laurel branch and oak branch are tied with a ribbon at the bottom. At the top are the words "Guerra 1940–43" ("War 1940–43"), and at the bottom is the letter "Z."

==== Ribbon ====
The medal's ribbon is identical to the badges. In the same manner as on the badges, burnished stars indicate complete years of service.

==== Clasps ====
Clasps are attached to the silk ribbon from which the medal is suspended indicating the campaign years in which the wearer participated in the war. One clasp is attached for each year, i.e., "1940," "1941," "1942," and "1943."

==== Wear ====
The medal is worn on the left side of the chest.
