= 1940–1945 African War Medal =

1940-1945 African War Medal
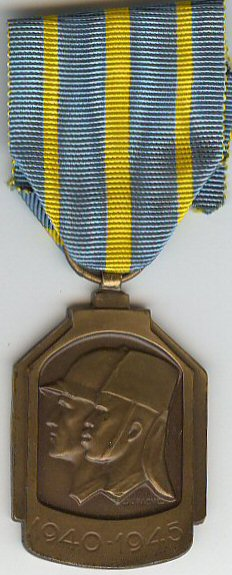
- 1940-1945 African War Medal (obverse)
- Type: War service medal
- Awarded for: Service in the Force Publique during World War II
- Presented by: Kingdom of Belgium
- Eligibility: Belgian citizens
- Status: No longer awarded
- Established: 30 January 1947

The 1940–1945 African War Medal (French: Médaille de la Guerre Africaine 1940-1945, Dutch: Afrikaanse Oorlogsmedaille 1940-1945) was a Belgian war service medal established by royal decree of the Regent on 30 January 1947 and awarded to officers and soldiers for at least one year's service in the Force Publique between 10 May 1940 and 7 May 1945. This service was not limited to the Belgian colonies of the Congo and Ruanda-Urundi but also included the Middle East, Nigeria, Madagascar and Burma, for which clasps were awarded for six months service in those areas.

Persons eligible for award of both the 1940–1945 Colonial War Effort Medal and the 1940–1945 African War Medal could only receive one of the two, usually the one earned for the longest period of service.

The 1940-1941 Belgian Ethiopian Campaign has his own medal : the Abyssinian Campaign Medal.

== Award description ==
The 1940–1945 African War Medal was a 52mm high (including suspension) by 33mm wide rectangular medal struck from bronze with sloped upper shoulders and rounded lower corners. Its obverse bore the relief images of the left profiles of a native African soldier wearing a fez and of a pith-helmeted Belgian soldier, both within a recessed central area. Under the recess, the embossed years "1940 - 1945". The reverse was plain.

Four clasps were issued for wear on the ribbon inscribed in French:

- NIGERIE (must be read as NIGÉRIE) for six months service in Nigeria
- MOYEN-ORIENT for six months service in the Middle East
- MADAGASCAR for six months service in Madagascar
- BIRMANIE for six months service in Burma

Air force personnel who served in theatre whether on an operational combat or transport unit received the medal with a miniature set of bronze wings on the ribbon.

The 1940–1945 African War Medal was suspended by a ring passing laterally though a suspension loop at the top of the medal, from a 37mm wide light blue silk moiré ribbon with a 5mm wide central yellow stripe and 3mm wide yellow stripes situated 5mm from the ribbon edges.

== See also ==
- Belgian Congo
- Orders, decorations, and medals of Belgium

== Other sources ==
- Quinot H., 1950, Recueil illustré des décorations belges et congolaises, 4e Edition. (Hasselt)
- Cornet R., 1982, Recueil des dispositions légales et réglementaires régissant les ordres nationaux belges. 2e Ed. N.pl., (Brussels)
- Borné A.C., 1985, Distinctions honorifiques de la Belgique, 1830-1985 (Brussels)
