= 1940–1945 Colonial War Effort Medal =

Belgian medal

1940-1945 Colonial War Effort Medal
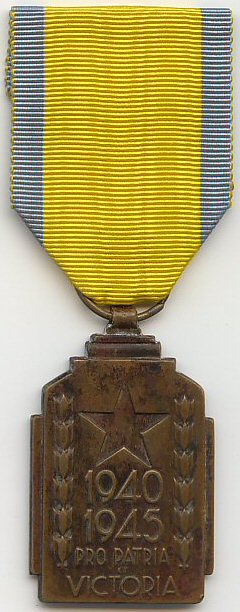
- 1940-1945 Colonial War Effort Medal (obverse)
- Type: War medal
- Awarded for: Service in Belgian colonies during World War II
- Presented by: Kingdom of Belgium
- Eligibility: Belgian citizens
- Status: No longer awarded
- Established: 30 January 1947

The 1940–1945 Colonial War Effort Medal (French: Médaille de l'Effort de Guerre Colonial 1940-1945, Dutch: Medaille voor de Koloniale Oorlogsinspanning 1940-1945) was a Belgian war service medal established by royal decree of the Regent on 30 January 1947 and awarded to government civil servants, magistrates, volunteer members of the female auxiliary service, missionaries, civilian agents of the different departments and civilians who served honourably for at least one year in the Belgian Congo or Ruanda-Urundi colonies of the Kingdom of Belgium in Africa between 10 May 1940 and 7 May 1945.

Persons eligible for the award of both the 1940–1945 Colonial War Effort Medal and the 1940–1945 African War Medal could only receive one of the two, usually the one earned for the longest service.

== Award description ==
The 1940–1945 Colonial War Effort Medal was a 31mm wide by 52mm high bronze rectangular medal with sloping upper corners. Its obverse bore at its upper center an embossed five pointed star above the relief inscription on five rows "1940" "1945" "PRO PATRIA" "ET" "VICTORIA" between vertical laurel leaves. The smooth reverse was plain.

The medal is suspended by a ring through a lateral suspension hole from a 37mm wide yellow silk moiré ribbon with 5mm wide light blue edge stripes.

== Notable recipients (partial list) ==
- Governor-General Pierre Ryckmans
- Léo Pétillon

== See also ==
- Orders, decorations, and medals of Belgium

== Other sources ==
- Quinot H., 1950, Recueil illustré des décorations belges et congolaises, 4e Edition. (Hasselt)
- Cornet R., 1982, Recueil des dispositions légales et réglementaires régissant les ordres nationaux belges. 2e Ed. N.pl., (Brussels)
- Borné A.C., 1985, Distinctions honorifiques de la Belgique, 1830-1985 (Brussels)
