= Gerard Van Caelenberge =

Belgian Air Force general

Air General Van Caelenberge
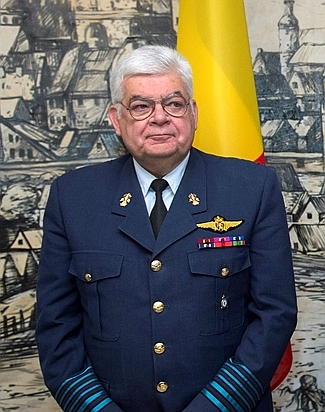
- Van Caelenberge, October 2015

Chief of Defence Belgium
- In office 30 March 2012 – 13 July 2016
- Preceded by: Charles-Henri Delcour
- Succeeded by: Marc Compernol

Commander Air Components Belgium
- In office 2006–2008

Personal details
- Born: Gerard Van Caelenberge; 6 September 1952 (age 73) Antwerp, Belgium
- Education: Royal Military Academy

Military service
- Allegiance: Belgium
- Branch/service: Belgian Air Component
- Years of service: 1975–2016
- Rank: Air Chief Marshall
- Unit: NATO Cooperative Cyber Defence Centre of Excellence; Chief of Defence of the Kingdom of Belgium; Belgium Air Force
- Commands: Assistant Chief of Staff Operations and Training; Flying Group of the 1st Fighter Wing; F-16 350th Squadron Beauvechain; Centralised Flying Schools; 10th Tactical Wing Kleine Brogel; Deputy Operations Commander; Aide-de-Camp to the King; Air Component Commander; European Air Group

Gerard Van Caelenberge is a Belgian Air Force general. He was Air Component Commander from 2006 to 2008 and Chief of Defence of the Kingdom of Belgium in March 2012 until he retired in July 2016. He was an expertise and member of the NATO Cooperative Cyber Defence Centre of Excellence.

Van Caelenberge was born on September 6, 1952, in Antwerp. He attended Collège Saint Michel Brasschaat and graduated from the Royal Cadets School Lier in 1970. He enrolled in the Royal Military Academy as student pilot of the polytechnic division graduated in 1975, he was trained on the Marchetti SF-260, Fouga Magister and T-33 in Brustem. He went on to obtained his pilots wings in 1977 and was trained on F-104G Startfighter. He was assigned to 350th Squadron of 1st Fighter Wing Beauvechain and attends a conversion of F-16 specific in electronic warfare.

He also attended the Royal Defence College for staff course 1984 and was back to the 350th Squadron. He was later assigned to AirForce Staff operations section in charge of Air Defence in 1985 and later went on to the Royal Defence College to complete his Senior Staff Course in 1987 and after completing he was the commander of the F-16 350th Squadron. He also commanded the Flying Group of the 1st Fighter Wing in Beauvechain base in 1995 and after attending a training, he was the instructor on Alpha-jet and Marchetti SF-260 in 1996 before he became the commander of Beauvechain airbase and the Flying Group Commander of the Centralised Flying Schools.

He went to the NATO Defence College Rome for a senior course in 1997. He commanded the 10th Tactical Wing in Kleine Brogel Base in 2001/2002 before he was moved to Defence Staff Operations and Training Department in 2004 and Deputy Operations Commander in 2005.

He became Aide-de-Camp to the King from 2005 to 2006 where he was made the Air Component commander in 2008 and the director of the European Air Group. He was Assistant Chief of Staff Operations and Training from 2009 to 2011, and rose to the rank of Air Chief Marshall (air general) before he was made the interim Chief of Defence in 2012 until his retirement in July 2016.

== Awards ==
- Commander, Order of Leopold
- Order of the Crown
- Commander, Order of Leopold II
- First Class, Military Cross
- Commemorative Medal for Foreign Operations or Missions
- Meritorious Service Medal
- NATO Medal
