= Michel Hofman =

Belgian Admiral

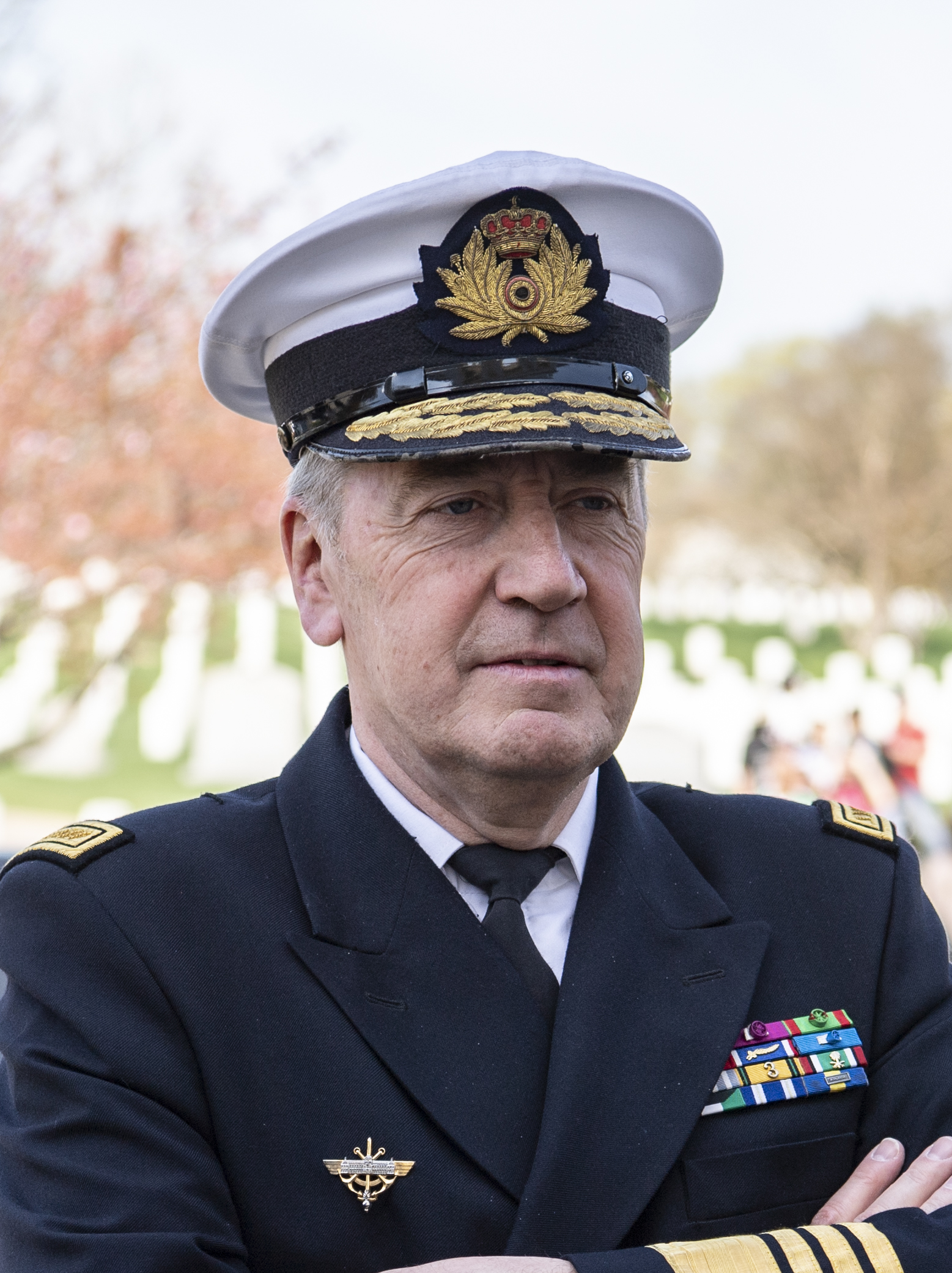
- Hofman in 2023
- Born: Michel Hofman; April 28, 1961 (age 65); Ostend
- Alma mater: Royal Military Academy
- Military career
- Allegiance: Belgium
- Branch: Belgian Navy
- Service years: 1978–present
- Rank: Admiral
- Commands: Chief of Defence; Vice Chief of Defence; Commander of the Belgian Navy; Operations & Training Department of the Defence Staff; F911 Westdiep
- Conflicts: Gulf War; Operation Active Endeavour; Operation Atalanta

Michel Hofman (born 28 April 1961), is a Belgian Admiral who served as the Chief of Defence of the Belgian Armed Forces from 10 July 2020 to 4 July 2024. Prior to his post, he served as the Vice-Chief of Defence.

== Education and Background ==
Hofman was born in Ostend, but moved to Brussels at a young age. He finished high school at the Royal Cadet School at Brussels, before entering the Royal Military Academy in 1978 as a candidate naval officer, studying social and military sciences (118th All weapons class). He also studied at the École de guerre - Terre (formerly College Interarmées de Défense) at France in 2000.

He was assigned in several positions on board the ships of the Belgian Navy, ranging from minesweepers, mine hunters and frigates. From 1991 and 1997, he served at the Operations School of the Belgian Navy in Bruges, and later on board the M917 Crocus, where he took part in the operations during the Gulf War, and the F911 Westdiep. He also served at the Standing NATO Maritime Group 1 (STANAVFORLANT). In autumn 1997, he joined the Chief of Defence staff, Vice Admiral Herteleer.

He commanded the F911 Westdiep in 2000, and took part on the Operation Active Endeavour in response to the September 11 attacks. In 2002, he was appointed as the Chief of Staff to the Belgian-Dutch Task Group, and in January 2004, he became Deputy Operations Assistant to the Commander of the Marine Component and Deputy Chief Operations Officer at the Benelux.

In 2006, he became the Deputy Officer and the Commander of the Operations Division within the Operations & Training Department of the Defence Staff.

In 2010, he served as a Deputy Commander to French Command during the Operation Atalanta, and later served as the Commander of the Belgian Navy and also became the Deputy Admiral Benelux. In May 2015 he served again at the Operations & Training Department of the Defence Staff, first as the Deputy Operations Officer and later as the Head of the Department. He was promoted to Vice Admiral on 26 June 2016. He was appointed as Vice Chief of Defense in July 2017.

On July 10, 2020, he was named as the new Chief of Defence, replacing General Marc Compernol.

On 4 July 2024 he was succeeded as Chief of Defence by Frederik Vansina.

== Awards ==
- Commander, Order of Leopold
- Order of the Crown
- Commander, Order of Leopold II
- First Class, Military Cross
- Commemorative Medal for Foreign Operations or Missions
- Meritorious Service Medal
- NATO Medal

== Personal life ==
Hofman is Bilingual, Dutch-French. He is married, father of 5 children. The family lives in Ostend.
