= Frederik Vansina =

Belgian general (born 1964)

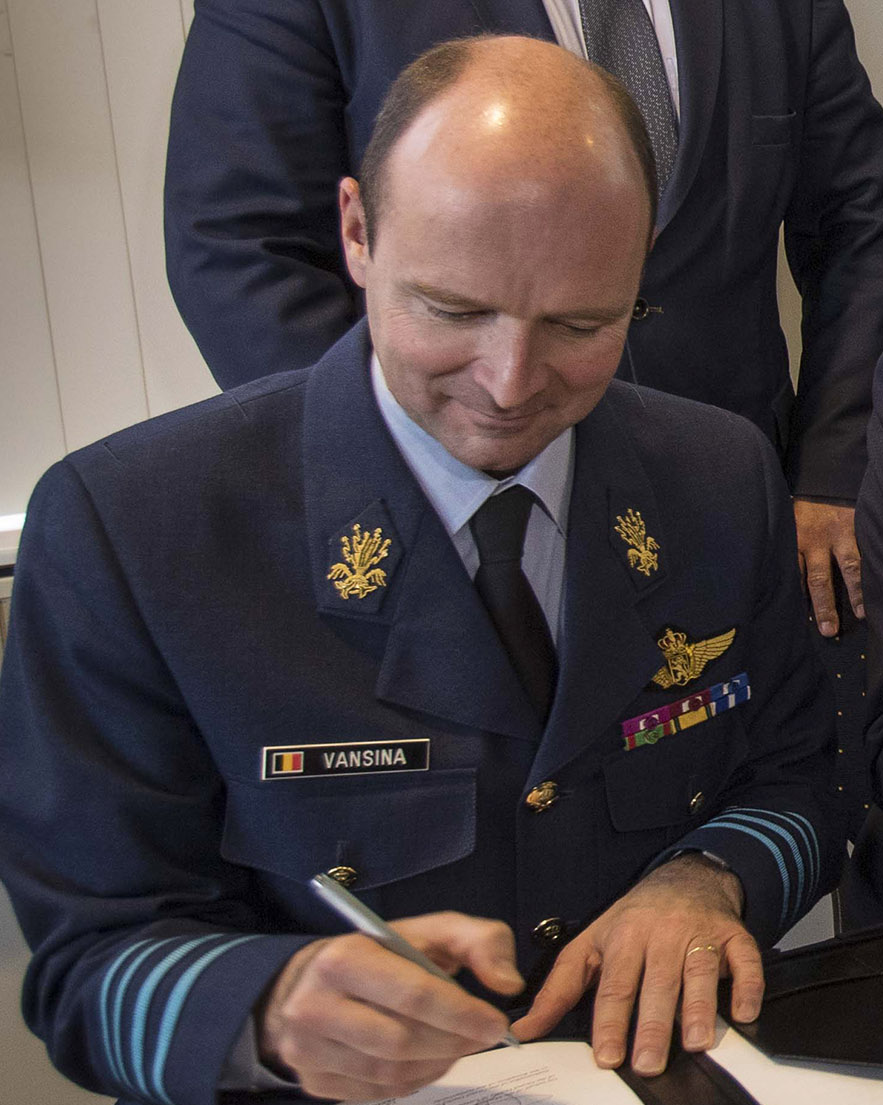
- Vansina in 2016
- Born: Frederik Vansina; 3 July 1964 (age 62); Bern, Switzerland
- Military career
- Allegiance: Belgium
- Branch: Belgian Air Component
- Service years: 1987–present
- Rank: General
- Commands: Chief of Defence; Vice-Chief of Defence; Commander, Belgian Air Component; 10th Tactical Wing; Operations Division (A3); 349th Fighter Squadron
- Conflicts: KFOR (Operation Joint Forge, Operation Allied Force); SFOR (Operation Joint Guardian); War in Afghanistan (ISAF); Operation Unified Protector

Frederik Vansina (born 3 July 1964) is a Belgian general and aviator in the Belgian Air Component who serves as the incumbent Chief of Defence of the Belgian Armed Forces, the highest-ranking official and overall professional head of the Armed Forces. Prior to his appointment to the post, Vansina formerly served as the Vice-Chief of Defence, commander of the Belgian Air Component, Aide-de-Camp of King Philippe of Belgium, and as commander of the 10th Tactical Wing.

== Military career and background ==
Vansina was born in Bern, Switzerland, to a diplomatic family and travelled a lot as a child. He graduated from the Royal Military Academy in 1987 and also holds a master's degree in Social and Military Sciences. Vansina later completed his aviation courses and became a fighter pilot in the 350th Squadron. Vansina also has a total of 2,600 flying hours as a fighter and command pilot, including 1,900 flying hours on the F-16A fighter planes and was later specialized in electronic warfare. Vansina later served as a fighter jet instructor of the 350th Squadron, and was later named as the squadron's weapons and tactics instructor. Vansina also completed his Majors Course and was later named as an operations officer of the 349th Fighter Squadron in 1995 and later joined the Plans and Programmes Division at the Air Component Headquarters, while subsequently serving as an equerry to then-Prince Philippe of Belgium for four years. Vansina was deployed to the Balkans in 1998 as part of the Belgian contingent of the Kosovo Force (KFOR) for the Belgian contingent in Operation Allied Force and Operation Joint Forge.

In 2000, Vansina was promoted to the rank of colonel and was later named as the squadron commander of the 349th Fighter Squadron, and later took part of Operation Joint Guardian under the Stabilisation Force in Bosnia and Herzegovina (SFOR), and later served as chief of operations of the Belgian-Dutch air contingent deployed at Amendola, Italy. Vansina later attended the Higher Staff Course at the Royal Higher Institute for Defence and was promoted to lieutenant colonel in 2002, where he was also named as the department head of the Strategy Department of the Joint Staff, and was tasked to conduct research for enhancing the tactical aerial operations of the Air Component. He was later named as the Assistant Chief of Staff for Strategy. In 2009, he was appointed commander of the 10th Tactical Wing at the Kleine Brogel Air Base and oversaw the deployment of F-16s to the NATO-led mission in Afghanistan as part of the Belgian component of the International Security Assistance Force (ISAF), as well as in the 2011 military intervention in Libya. After completing the Senior Course at the NATO Defense College, Vansina was later named as the Chief of Staff of the Belgian Air Component in February 2013. Vansina was later promoted to the rank of major general in March 2014, and was named as the Deputy Chief of Staff for Operations and Training, and was later named as the Commander of the Belgian Air Component and took office in November 2014, where he oversaw Belgian involvement in the multinational campaign against Islamic State.

In September 2016, Vansina was subsequently named as Aide-de-camp of King Philippe of Belgium, and was later named as the Director of the European Air Group before ending his term as the Commander of the Belgian Air Component in September 2020, as he was named as Assistant Chief of Staff for Strategy at the Belgian Defence Staff. He later ended his term as director of the European Air Group in 2022. Vansina became Vice-Chief of Defence in September 2023. On 4 July 2024, Vansina succeeded Admiral Michel Hofman as Chief of Defence.

== Awards from military service ==
- Commander, Order of Leopold (2014)
- Commander, Order of the Crown (2000)
- Commander, Order of Leopold II
- First Class, Military Cross
- Commemorative Medal for Foreign Operations or Missions
- NATO Medal for Kosovo
- Belgian Air Component Wings Badge
- Commander of the Order of Legion of Honour
