= Croix de guerre (Belgium) =

War Cross
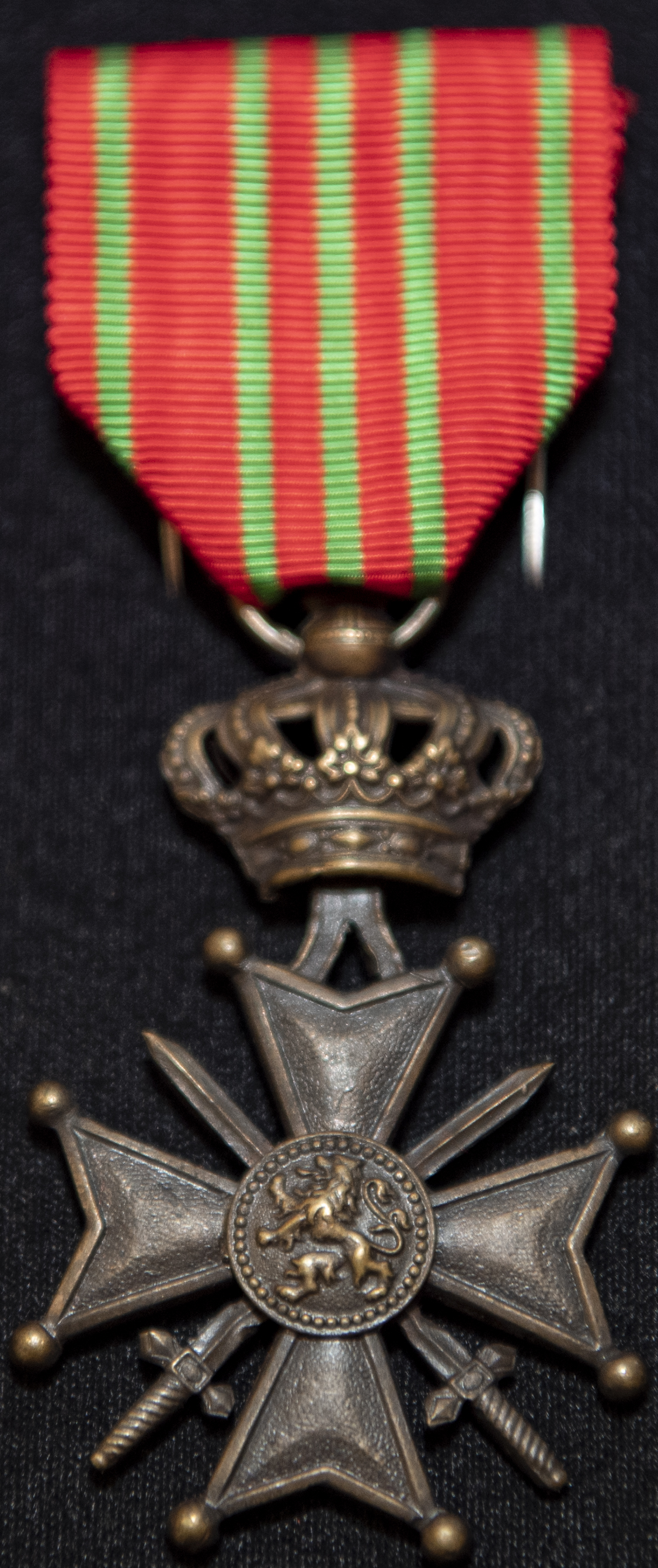
- World War I Croix de guerre with Palm (obverse)
- Type: Military decoration
- Awarded for: Bravery in the face of the enemy or front service
- Country: Belgium
- Eligibility: Belgians and military personnel of allied forces
- Campaigns: WW I, WW II, Korean War
- Clasps: Palms, lions
- Status: Dormant
- Established: 25 October 1915 (World War I); 20 July 1940 (World War II); 3 April 1954 (Future wars)
- Ribbon bar for World War I Ribbon bar for World War II Ribbon bar for 1954–present

Precedence
- Next (higher): Military decoration for exceptional service or gallantry
- Next (lower): Armed resistance medal

The Croix de guerre (French) or Oorlogskruis (Dutch) is a military decoration of the Kingdom of Belgium established by royal decree on 25 October 1915. It was primarily awarded for bravery or other military virtue on the battlefield. The award was reestablished on 20 July 1940 by the Belgian government in exile for recognition of bravery and military virtue during World War II. The post-1940 decoration could also be awarded to units that were cited. The decoration was again reestablished by royal decree on 3 April 1954 for award during future conflicts.

== World War I ==
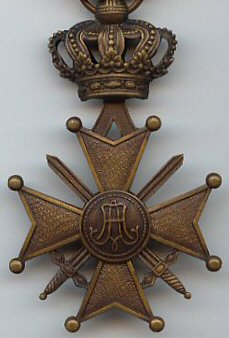
Reverse of the WW1 Croix de guerre

=== Award statute ===
The World War I Croix de guerre was established by royal decree on 25 October 1915 as an award for bravery or other military virtue on the battlefield. It was only awarded to individuals. The Croix de guerre was not only awarded for bravery but also for three years or more of service on the front line, or for good conduct on the battlefield. It was also awarded to volunteers older than 40 or younger than 16 after a minimum of 18 months of service, to escaped prisoners of war rejoining the armed forces, and to military personnel who were placed on inactive duty because of injury.

=== Award description ===
The World War I Croix de guerre was a 40mm wide bronze Maltese cross with 3mm in diameter balls at its eight points. It had a 14mm in diameter central medallion bearing the relief image of a "lion rampant" on its obverse and the royal cypher of King Albert I on its reverse. Two 37mm long crossed swords point upwards between it arms. A 14mm high "inverted V" between the two points of the top cross arm is secured to the inside of a 25mm wide by 25mm high royal crown, the ribbon's suspension ring passes through the top orb of the crown giving the cross a total height of 65mm.

The ribbon of the World War I Croix de guerre is red 38 mm (1.5 in) wide, with five 2 mm (0.079 in) wide light green longitudinal stripes, three at the center separated by 3 mm (0.12 in) and one on each side 3 mm from the edges.

When the person being awarded the Croix de guerre was mentioned in despatches, this distinction was denoted by a device worn on the ribbon, either a small lion or a palm adorned with the monogram "A" (for Albert I):

- Bronze lion: regimental level
- Silver lion: brigade level
- Gold lion: divisional level
- Bronze palm: Army level
- Silver palm: five bronze palms
- Gold palm: five silver palms

When awarded posthumously, the ribbon of the Croix de guerre was adorned with a narrow black enamel bar.

== World War II ==
=== Award statute ===
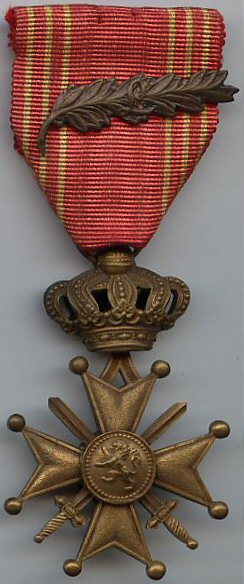
World War II Croix de guerre with Palm (obverse)

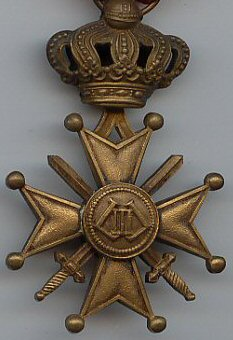
Reverse of the World War II Croix de guerre

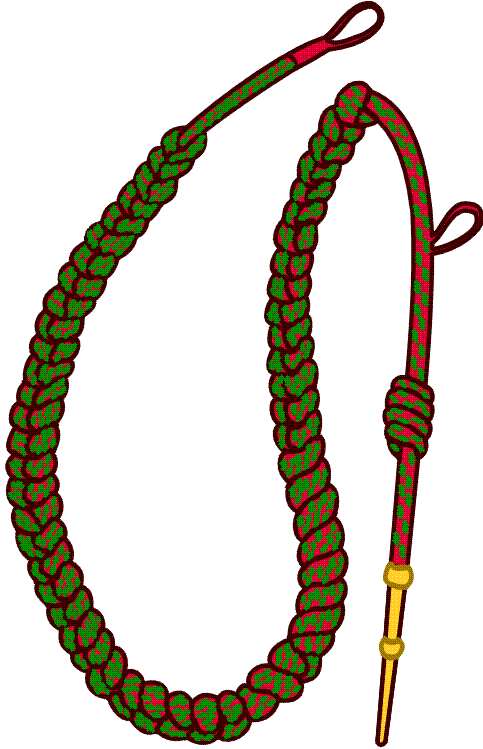
Fourragère of the WW II Belgian Croix de guerre

The World War II Croix de guerre was established on 20 July 1940 by the Belgian government in exile, it differed from the World War I version in its statute and slight changes to the reverse of the central medallion and the ribbon.

It was still mainly awarded to individuals, but was now also authorized as a unit award. A war cross being presented to a unit was denoted by a ribbon of the war cross being affixed to the unit colours

The Belgian fourragère was awarded by the Belgian Government to a unit that was cited twice. Award of the fourragère was not automatic and required a specific decree of the Belgian Government. The fourragère is in the same colours as the ribbon of the World War II Croix de guerre. The Belgian fourragère was only worn by those who were members of the unit at the time of the award.

=== Award description ===
The World War II Croix de guerre was constructed in the same dimensions as its World War I predecessor, the only real difference being the royal cypher of King Leopold III on its reverse. The new ribbon was still red with light green stripes but there were now six, 1mm wide, and positioned three on each side 2mm apart beginning 2mm from the edge of the ribbon.

The same ribbon devices were used as in World War I except the palms were now adorned with the monogram "L" (for Leopold III).

== Post 1954 variant ==
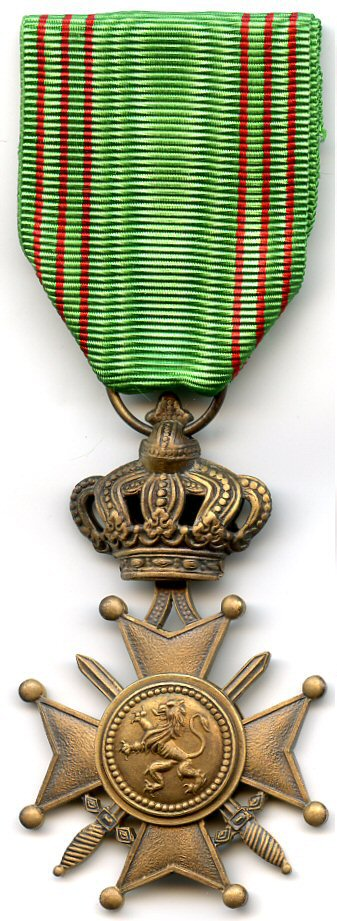
Obverse of the post-1954 Croix de guerre

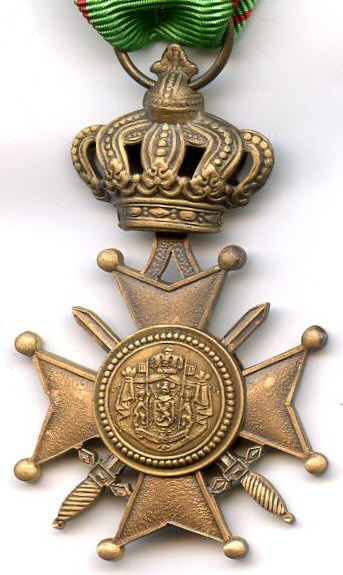
Reverse of the post-1954 Croix de guerre

=== Award statute ===
On 3 April 1954, the Belgian government re-established the Croix de guerre but this time without any reference to a specific conflict. This decoration was intended to be awarded in a manner akin the World War II statute during potential future wars. The 1954 Croix de guerre has not yet been awarded and is currently no longer part of the military regulations regarding awards and decorations, although the cross was never officially abolished.

=== Award description ===
The post-1954 (or current) Croix de guerre is similar to the previous variants but with a different reverse center medallion now bearing the Coat of arms of Belgium in lieu of a royal monogram.

The ribbon is a colour reversal of the World War II Croix de guerre ribbon, green with three narrow 1mm wide red stripes 2mm apart on each side beginning 2mm from the edge.

== See also ==
- Croix de Guerre (France)
- Croix de Guerre 1914–1918 (France)
- Croix de Guerre 1939–1945 (France)
- Orders, decorations, and medals of Belgium

== Other sources ==
- Quinot H., 1950, Recueil illustré des décorations belges et congolaises, 4e Edition. (Hasselt)
- Cornet R., 1982, Recueil des dispositions légales et réglementaires régissant les ordres nationaux belges. 2e Ed. N.pl., (Brussels)
- Borné A.C., 1985, Distinctions honorifiques de la Belgique, 1830–1985 (Brussels)
- Paul Hieronymussen, 1967, Orders Medals and Decorations of Britain and Europe in colour, 2nd Ed. 1970. (London)
