= List of Medal of Military Merit (Belgium) recipients =

The following persons have been awarded the Belgian Medal of Military Merit for exceptional services to the Belgian Armed Forces since the creation of the medal in 2005.

== 2015 ==
The Medal of Military Merit was awarded to six members of the Belgian Armed Forces.

- Warrant Officer P. Gautier
- First Master Corporal Steve Maertens
- First Master Corporal Pascal Branswyk
- First Master Corporal Hans Claessens
- Master Corporal Emmanuel Godart
- Corporal Kenny Lemmens

== 2014 ==
The Medal of Military Merit was awarded to eight members of the Belgian Armed Forces.

- Captain-Commandant (Reserve) J. Berger
- Captain-Commandant (Air Force) Renaud Thys
- Captain-Commandant (Air Force) Joffrey Dellis
- Chief Warrant Officer Alidor Haccourt
- Chief Warrant Officer Wim Van Thielen
- First Master Corporal Patrick Christiaens
- First Master Corporal Fabien Wattiaux
- Corporal Niels Scrayen

== 2013 ==
The Medal of Military Merit was awarded to twelve military and one civilian members of the Belgian Armed Forces.

- Mrs. Martine Prospero
- Captain Christophe Comhair
- Master Warrant Officer Patrick Eerdekens
- Master Warrant Officer Ivan Fierens
- Master Warrant Officer Erik Vanloffelt
- Master Warrant Officer (Air Force Reserve) E. Vercruysse
- Master Warrant Officer Patrick Weckx
- Chief Warrant Officer Patrick Choquet
- Chief Warrant Officer Marino Eeckhout
- Chief Warrant Officer Erik Sainte
- Chief Warrant Officer Paul Weijtens
- First Sergeant-Major Olivier Elsen
- First Master Corporal Eric Andre

== 2012 ==
The Medal of Military Merit was awarded to eight members of the Belgian Armed Forces.

- Lieutenant-General (Air Force) François Florkin
- Colonel (Medical Reserve) Paul Vanneste, MD
- Master Warrant Officer Gerald Hernalsteen
- Master Warrant Officer Patrick Vermeulen
- Chief Warrant Officer Erik Bejstrup
- First Master Corporal Frank Boelens
- Private First Class Timothy De Mars

The Medal of Military merit was awarded to two members of the United States Air Force.

- Colonel Mark E. Carter
- Major Anthony F. Sidoti

from the Office of Defense Cooperation of the United States embassy in Belgium and Luxemburg, for their contribution to the Belgian Air Component operations during its military intervention above Libya.

== 2011 ==
The Medal of Military Merit was awarded to eleven members of the Belgian Armed Forces.

- Lieutenant-General Baudouin Somers (Aide to the King)
- Lieutenant Luc Gille
- Chief Warrant Officer Emmanuel Livemont
- Master Warrant Officer Peter Prevot
- Chief Warrant Officer P. Cosse
- Chief Warrant Officer Stefaan Mouton
- Warrant Officer E. Rits
- First Master Corporal C. Lessire
- First Master Corporal R. Senesael
- First Master Corporal Philippe Trickels
- First Master Corporal Luc Volders

== 2010 ==
The Medal of Military Merit was awarded to eleven members of the Belgian Armed Forces.

- Major Werner Lauwers
- Major Rik Olievier
- Major Danny Snelders
- Master Warrant Officer A. Baccus
- Master Warrant Officer Danny Tielens
- Warrant Officer musician R. De Klippel
- First Sergeant Lionel Likin
- First Sergeant Philippe Scimar
- First Master Corporal Alain Jetteur
- First Master Corporal Chris Mertens
- Master Corporal Sean Vereecken

The Medal of Military merit was awarded to one member of the French Army.

- Brigade General Philippe Léonard, former commander of the Multinational Task Force North of the allied forces in Kosovo, of which the Belgian detachment was member.

== 2009 ==
The Medal of Military Merit was awarded to ten members of the Belgian Armed Forces.

- Warrant Officer Pascal Blanchart
- Warrant Officer Philippe Boon
- Warrant Officer Ivo Henkens
- First Master Chief Michel Bouché
- First Master Chief D. Thonon
- Sergeant James Ching
- First Master Corporal Bruno Coenen
- First Master Corporal Daniel Kolczyk
- First Master Corporal Yvan Moriamé

== 2008 ==
The Medal of Military Merit was awarded to ten members of the Belgian Armed Forces, including for the first time an officer from the reserve corps and an Air Force officer.

- Major (Army Reserve) I. Dupont
- Captain-Commandant (Air Force) Baudouin Heuninckx
- Master Warrant Officer G. Janssen
- Warrant Officer Dirk Brans
- Warrant Officer F. Christiaens
- Warrant Officer John Claerhout
- Warrant Officer Stephan Hussin
- First Sergeant Ian Dierckx
- Corporal D. Tricot
- Private First Class Nordine Boukhalfa

== 2007 ==
The Medal of Military Merit was awarded to nine members of the Belgian Armed Forces.

- Chief Warrant Officer P. Istas
- Warrant Officer Kris Donne
- Warrant Officer Franky Wheaton
- First Sergeant-Major Jozef Van Lancker
- First Master Sergeant A. Pillitteri
- First Master Corporal F. De Paepe
- First Master Corporal D. Giangiulio
- First Master Corporal Georges Surkyn
- First Master Corporal M. Van Thillo

== 2006 ==
The Medal of Military Merit was awarded to eleven members of the Belgian Armed Forces.

- Captain-Commandant P. Dumon
- Master Warrant Officer G. Lenders
- Master Warrant Officer L. Marechal
- Master Warrant Officer Gino Van Eeckhout
- Warrant Officer L. Bouvy
- Warrant Officer P. Schepmans
- Warrant Officer G. Verlent
- First Master Corporal D. Ladangh
- First Master Corporal Hugues Prevost
- First Master Corporal M.-C. Vandeweert
- First Master Corporal I. Verdeyen

== 2005 ==
The Medal of Military Merit was awarded to four members of the Belgian Armed Forces.

- Sergeant Yoann Severijns
- Master Corporal J.-P. Doyen
- Master Corporal S. Vanmalleghem
- Private First Class M. Toussaint

== See also ==
- Medal of Military Merit (Belgium)
- List of Belgian military decorations
