= Pieter De Crem =

Flemish politician (born 1962)

- De Crem in 2017

Minister of the Interior and Security
- In office 9 December 2018 – 1 October 2020
- Prime Minister: Charles Michel; Sophie Wilmès
- Preceded by: Jan Jambon
- Succeeded by: Annelies Verlinden

Secretary of State for Foreign Trade
- In office 11 October 2014 – 9 December 2018
- Prime Minister: Charles Michel
- Preceded by: Position recreated
- Succeeded by: Position abolished

Minister of Defence
- In office 21 December 2007 – 11 October 2014
- Prime Minister: Guy Verhofstadt; Herman Van Rompuy; Yves Leterme; Elio Di Rupo
- Preceded by: André Flahaut
- Succeeded by: Steven Vandeput

First Deputy Prime Minister of Belgium
- In office 5 March 2013 – 11 October 2014
- Prime Minister: Elio Di Rupo
- Preceded by: Steven Vanackere
- Succeeded by: Kris Peeters

Personal details
- Born: 22 July 1962 (age 64) Aalter, Belgium
- Party: Christian Democratic and Flemish
- Spouse: Caroline Bergez
- Education: Catholic University of Leuven; Free University of Brussels, Dutch
- Website: Official website

Pieter Frans Norbert Jozef Raymond De Crem (pronounced [ˈpitər də ˈkrɛm]; born 22 July 1962) is a Belgian politician and member of Christian Democratic and Flemish (CD&V). He has been a Member of the Belgian Chamber of Representatives since 1995. He headed the CD&V fraction in the Chamber of Representatives from 2003 to 2007. From 1995 to 2025, he was the mayor of Aalter in East Flanders. In September 2025, Pieter De Crem was forced to resign following a finding that the city systematically discriminated against foreigners and people with migration background trying to settle in Aalster.

De Crem became the Belgian minister of defense on 21 December 2007. On 5 March 2013, he was also appointed First Deputy Prime Minister in the Belgian federal government. From 11 October 2014 to 9 December 2018, he served as Secretary of State for Foreign Trade in the Michel I Government. He was subsequently appointed Minister for Security and the Interior under the Michel II Government.

== Education ==
De Crem holds a Master of Romance Philology from Katholieke Universiteit Leuven (Catholic University of Leuven) and a Master of European and international Law from Vrije Universiteit Brussel (Free University of Brussels). De Crem attended the six-week Harvard Business School Advanced Management Program.

== Municipal politics ==
- When Jan De Crem – father of Pieter De Crem – decided to retire after more than 30 years in office as a mayor of the township of Aalter, Pieter was considered as his favorite successor. In 1994, he participated for the first time in the municipal elections. He was straightaway elected mayor. His mandate was renewed in the elections in 2000 and in 2006.
- During the elections of 2006, all opposition parties in Aalter bundled their efforts while attempting to break the Christian Democrate majority. The opposition was led by former federal Minister Jef Tavernier. Nevertheless, the election resulted in a major success for the incumbent majority as two out of three citizens voted in favor of De Crem's party.
- With the municipal elections of 14 October 2012, De Crem even succeeded in improving his success of 2006. His party won 64,56% of the votes, which entitles it to 19 out of the 25 seats in Aalter.
- The municipal elections of 14 October 2018 confirmed his absolute majority, and he became by far the most popular politician in Aalter with a personal score of 5056 preferential votes.

On September 7, 2025, Pieter De Crem resigned because of his controversional policy to discriminate non-Belgians when registering in his municipality.

== Minister of Defense ==
- On 21 December 2007, when the ‘interim government Verhofstadt III’ was established, De Crem was appointed Minister of Defense. He promptly revised a controversial arms contract, signed by his predecessor André Flahaut, who ordered several non-NATO standard 90mm turrets for Belgian Army's armored vehicles. On 23 January 2008, he came into the news by suggesting that nuclear capability was present at the Kleine Brogel Air Base, confirming in this way Belgium's responsibilities in NATO's nuclear policy.
- De Crem increased the participation of the Belgian armed forces in international operations. As of early 2009, well over 1.200 Belgian troops participated in peace support missions around the world. This was an increase by half compared with the average during the five preceding years. Belgium sent the first four and later even six F-16 combat aircraft to Kandahar in southern Afghanistan. According to De Crem, hereby supported by several international reports, an emphasis must be granted on training the Afghan Army and Police. As a result, he sent two Operational Mentoring and Liaison Teams to Kunduz in the north to train the Afghan National Army. Meanwhile, the UNIFIL mission in Lebanon was extended for one year.
- He also launched several new initiatives. From September 2009, a Belgian navy frigate, flying the European flag, patrols in the Gulf of Aden to fight piracy.
- In May 2009, when a Belgian ship, the 'Pompey', was hijacked in the Gulf of Aden, he offers immediate military assistance to all Belgian merchant vessels sailing through the strait of Aden. At the same time, De Crem and his colleague Minister of Justice Stefaan De Clerck update an old law against piracy in order to enable prosecution. The Vessel Protection Disposal concept was born.
- As part of the budget cuts by the Belgian Government, Minister De Crem accelerated the reduction in staff from 42,000 to 37,725 employees. He realized, six years earlier than planned, the objectives of previous army reform. At the same time, he reduced the number of generals by 20 percent.
- On 21 October 2009, De Crem got the approval of the government for his own transformation plan. Initially, it received severe opposition from the unions. The plan completes all former but still unfinished reforms. De Crem is committed to finalizing this reform in the current legislative period. By 2012 the number of employees shall be reduced to 34,000 and 23 military barracks will close. Equipment and personnel are grouped together to form new and fully deployable units. The contingent needs to be reduced to bring expenditure back into balance.
- After years of searching in the jungle of Central Africa, Minister De Crem approved new defense efforts in order to locate the remains of a helicopter crash. The plane, a Piasecki H-21 Shawnee, was flown by a Belgian military three-man crew. It disappeared in 1965 in bad weather conditions. At the end of 2010, at year long insistence of the families, and because De Crem considers it important that the fate of every missing soldier is known, the Minister approved and sponsored an expedition into the jungle. Belgian paratroopers found the wreck after a four-day march through inaccessible terrain. They do not find any human remains, however, though they found serial numbers that demonstrated that they’d found the missing helicopter.
- De Crem used the opportunity of the Belgian EU-Presidency in the second half of 2010 to set the first steps towards more cooperation in the field of a common European Defence. On 9 December 2010 at the Council for Foreign Affairs in Brussels, all 27 Defence Ministers of the EU Member States supported the "Ghent Framework Initiative". European member states commit themselves to more cooperation in the defence field through pooling and sharing. The Framework Initiative took shape at the end of September in Ghent during the informal meeting that was convened by Minister De Crem.
- De Crem's name also pops up several times in the Wikileaks 'Cables'. They were sent by the U.S. Ambassador in Brussels to Washington saying that De Crem is striving to become again a reliable ally within NATO. Another message in which De Crem shows up, states that Belgium is a small country that will and can play an important role in Europe.
- In the middle of March 2011, all political parties in parliament requested a decisive attitude of the Belgian Government in response to Muammar Gaddafi, who was using tanks against the Libyan population in order to stop the "Arab Spring". As proposed by De Crem, Belgium offered six F-16 fighter aircraft, a minehunter, and one hundred and fifty soldiers to the international coalition. Belgium was one of the first countries to join the NATO operation for the protection of the population of Libya.
- On Wednesday, 18 April 2012, Belgian Minister of Defense, De Crem, and his Dutch and Luxembourg counterparts, Hans Hillen and Jean-Marie Halsdorf, respectively, signed a letter of intent on cooperation in the field of defence. This opens new possibilities for greater cooperation of the three armies and possible joint participation in NATO or EU operations.
- On 11 May 2012, Minister of Defense Pieter De Crem received the approval of the Council of Ministers for his investment plan for the Belgian Armed Forces. In 2012, 242 million euros will be invested. With this plan, Belgium wants to answer the recurring question of NATO for the renewal of its military equipment.
- On 20 and 21 May 2012, Minister De Crem, accompanied by Minister of Foreign Affairs Didier Reynders and Belgian Prime Minister Elio Di Rupo, participated at the NATO-summit in Chicago, United States. The key theme on the agenda was the role of NATO in the International Security and Assistance Force (ISAF) in Afghanistan. The decision has been made that all 130.000 international forces, including 600 Belgian military personnel, have to leave the country before the end of 2014. Afterward, NATO will continue to assist, train and support the Afghan security forces. The Belgian government has agreed to donate 12 million euros annually, after 2014, for the reconstruction of Afghanistan.
- On 11 July 2012, De Crem announced that the government had unanimously agreed to appoint Lieutenant General Gerard Van Caelenberge as the new Chief of the Belgian Armed Forces. The Council of Ministers of 13 July 2012, will confirm this mandate for a period of four years. Lieutenant General Van Caelenberge already took over this function on a temporary basis, after the resignation of his predecessor, General Charles-Henri Delcour in March 2012.
- During the budget negotiations for 2013, the Belgian government has agreed upon a one-time cut of 100 million euros in the Defense budget. Despite this considerable sum, Minister De Crem assured that the impact on the Department of Defense would stay relatively limited. Neither the operationality of the Belgian Armed Forces or the further implementation of the transformation plan that is almost fully realized, will be affected. Savings will be made in the domain of investments, although without canceling large projects. The planned investments for 2012, worth a total of 242 million euros, will not be influenced. The further implementation of the government agreement will thus remain the reference for this term.
- On 21 December 2012, the first NH90 helicopter has been delivered to the Belgian Ministry of Defence, in the context of the investment implementation. The handover ceremony took place on the Eurocopter Site in Marignane (France); this helicopter is part of an order for a total of eight NH90s: four in the TTH (Tactical Transport Helicopter) variant, and four NFH (NATO Frigate Helicopter). The TTHs will be used for tactical transport missions. Two of the four NFHs will be deployed on Belgium's M-class frigates; the two others will take over the Search and Rescue mission of the current Sea Kings.
- On 8 January 2013, De Crem was awarded the "Großes Verdienstkreuz mit Stern und Schulterband des Verdienstordens der Bundesrepublik Deutschland". This prestigious German decoration was awarded to him by the German Federal President Joachim Gauck, in particular for his efforts to strengthen the cooperation between the armed forces of both countries. The decoration was presented to him by the German ambassador in Belgium, Eckart Cuntz.
- On 15 January 2013, Minister De Crem received the approval of the Council of Ministers for a military contribution to the French military Operation Serval, aiming to stop and defeat an aggressive Islamic militant rebellion in the north of Mali. The Belgian Defence deploys 75 soldiers, two C-130 transport planes, and two Agusta A109 helicopters for medevac.
- On 18 February 2013, the Belgian Government decided to participate in the Training Mission of the European Union (EUTM Mali) in Mali after positively evaluating Belgian participation in the French operation Serval. Belgian C-130 transport planes will end their mission on 28 February 2013. Furthermore, the Government accepted De Crem's proposal to participate in EUTM. Belgian Defense will extend the presence of the two A109 medevac helicopters for the benefit of EUTM. The Government accepted an additional contribution to deliver force protection troops for the training camp or headquarters, provided that this participation is in proportion with the efforts of the other European partners.
- On Wednesday, 13 March 2013, Deputy Prime Minister and Minister of Defense Pieter De Crem received the approval of the restricted Council of Ministers to send 50 Belgian troops to Mali to assure the protection of the European Mission (EUTM) aiming to train Mali's armed forces. In total, 150 European troops will guarantee the safety of this mission.
- End of April 2013, De Crem inaugurated the new post of Belgian Defence Attaché in Germany. This is a part of a broader reorientation of the posts of Belgian Defence Attachés worldwide. Earlier that month, Minister De Crem already opened a new post in Brazil.
- On 14 May 2013, De Crem and Luxembourg Defence Minister Jean-Marie Halsdorf have signed a technical agreement that will strengthen the cooperation between the armed forces of both countries in the field of military air transport. Both countries opted for the Airbus A400M transport aircraft.
- During a conference at the Royal Higher Institute for Defence on 12 June 2013, De Crem called for a continuation of the Belgian military presence in Afghanistan, even after the end of the ISAF-mission in 2014, by taking part in the support and training mission that will replace the current NATO-led mission.
- On 20 June 2013, the Belgian Council of Ministers approved the proposal of Pieter De Crem to expand the Belgian contribution to EUTM Mali by sending 70 troops as part of the force protection of the training camp Koulikoro. They will be responsible for the protection of the infrastructure and of the trainers and other staff of the mission. They will also protect the convoys between Koulikoro and Bamako and be ready to intervene in case of incidents as a Quick Reaction Force. Belgium will alternate the command of this protection mission with Spain. The two A109 helicopters, who are already supporting the EUTM-mission, will return to Belgium not later than 31 July 2013. The first detachment of some fifty soldiers left for Mali on 10 July 2013, from the military airport of Melsbroek, where they were greeted by Minister De Crem.
- On 18 July 2013, the Belgian Senate approved two bills proposed by Minister De Crem that modify the status of Belgian military personnel. Earlier, on 17 July 2013, the Chamber of the Belgian Parliament already gave its approval. These changes, the most important since 2007, aimed at modernizing Belgian Defense in terms of personnel structure, management of personnel, military ability, internal recruitment, and transition from a military to a civilian career.
- Following the Dutch decision to buy 37 Joint Strike Fighters F-35 from the American aircraft manufacturer Lockheed Martin, Minister De Crem said that Belgium also needs to acquire a successor for the F-16. A decision must be taken quickly, explained De Crem, because of the large time gap between a political decision and the actual delivery of the aircraft. The JSF of F-35 will probably be the fighter aircraft used within NATO.
- On 1 and 2 October 2013, Minister De Crem visited the Belgian troops currently in Mali as part of the European Union Training Mission EUTM Mali. Minister De Crem also met with the commanders of EUTM and the French Operation Serval and spoke with different authorities from Mali, the United Nations, and the African Union.
- In his speech at the Royal Higher Institute for Defence on 11 December 2013, Minister De Crem has clearly called for the first time for the acquisition of a new fighter plane to succeed the F-16 aircraft, currently used by the Belgian Air Force. According to Minister De Crem, the Belgian Air Force needs about forty aircraft to remain a reliable partner. During the same speech, the Minister also launched the proposal that the Benelux region presents itself as a joint constituency for the European elections in 2019. This would give the Benelux the same numerical importance in the European Parliament as Spain or Poland, when it comes to its voting weight.
- On 13 December 2013, the Belgian Council of Ministers approved the proposal of Pieter De Crem to contribute to the French military operation in the Central African Republic with an Airbus A330 for the strategic airlift and a Lockheed C-130 Hercules for the tactical airlift. Both planes will transport French and African troops and their equipment to the Central African Republic. On the same day, the Council of Ministers also approved the operations of the Belgian Defence in 2014. The ongoing operations in Afghanistan and Lebanon will continue. The mission in Mali continues until May. In the second semester, the Belgian Navy will send a frigate for the European mission ATALANTA. Also, in the second semester, the Belgian Defence will take the lead of a European Union Battle Group. This involves approximately 1,800 Belgian military personnel that can be deployed on a short-term base.
- On 6 February 2014, De Crem gave a speech at a meeting of military reserve forces at NATO’s headquarters in Brussels, in which he outlined his vision on NATO's future. Among other topics, he stressed the need to further strengthen the transatlantic bond, with a balanced burden-sharing between the European Union and the United States.
- Pieter De Crem was often considered to become the next Secretary-General of NATO. A so-called secret visit to Washington end of 2013 nourished these speculations, and well-informed diplomatic sources put him in pole position. The North Atlantic Council however, agreed on 28 March 2014, on the former Norwegian socialist Prime Minister Jens Stoltenberg.
- On 2 June 2014, De Crem and his Dutch colleague Jeanine Hennis-Plasschaert have visited the Royal Military Academy in Brussels and the Belgian training center for paratroopers in Schaffen, near Diest. From mid-2015, both the Belgian and Dutch paratroopers will be trained here together. This initiative is part of the ongoing quest of both countries to enhance cooperation among allies in the field of defense.
- Following a formal request from the United States to Belgium, the federal government and the MP's approved the proposal of Deputy Prime Minister and Minister of Defense Pieter De Crem for Belgian military participation in the international coalition against the terrorist group Islamic State. Belgian Defense will deploy a military detachment consisting of 120 personnel and six F-16 fighter jets, which will operate from Jordan.

== Secretary of State for Foreign Trade ==
- On 11 October 2014, he took the oath as Secretary of State for Foreign Trade in the Belgian Government. Since 2017, he has also been a Special Envoy of the Federal Government for the research project MYRRHA of the Belgian Nuclear Research Center. He held this position until 9 December 2018, when he was subsequently appointed as Minister for Security and the Interior.

== Minister of the Interior and Security ==
- After the fall of the Michel I government and the departure of N-VA from the government, De Crem became Minister of the Interior and Security, in the Michel II government on 9 December 2018.

== Honours ==
- Belgium: Grand Officer in the Order of Leopold
- Denmark: Knight Grand cross in the Order of the Dannebrog.
- Netherlands: Knight Grand Cross in the Order of Orange-Nassau.
- Germany: Grand Cross in the Order of Merit of the Federal Republic of Germany.

== Other information ==
- De Crem has faced criticism for visiting a New York bar with taxpayers' money, claiming it was for a United Nations meeting. However, his own aides admitted they knew the meeting was cancelled.
- De Crem is known for his staunch support for the maintenance of Nuclear Weapons on Belgian soil. As revealed, he also pressed Prime Minister Leterme to maintain the 'secret' weapons in Belgium.

Political offices
Preceded by André Flahaut	Minister of Defence; 2007–2014	Succeeded by Steven Vandeput
Preceded by Jan Jambon	Minister of the Interior and Security; 2018–2020	Succeeded by Annelies Verlinden
