= Military Decoration =

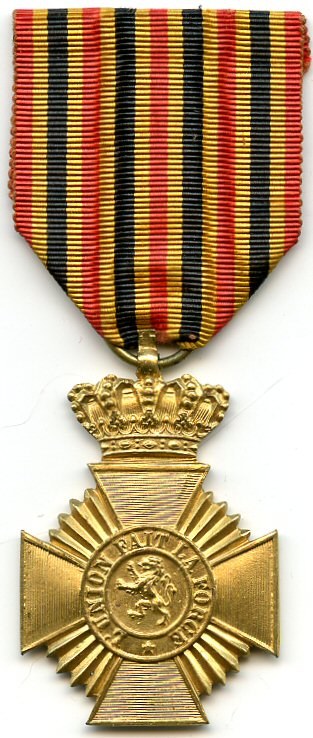
- Military Decoration, second class
- Type: Military decoration
- Eligibility: Non-Commissioned Officers and enlisted ranks of the Belgian Armed Forces
- Status: Active
- Established: December 22, 1873
- Ribbon

Precedence
- Next (higher): Military Cross
- Next (lower): Cross of Honour for Military Service Abroad

The Military Decoration (Dutch: Militair Ereteken, French: Décoration Militaire) is a military award of the Kingdom of Belgium. It was established on December 23, 1873 and is awarded to non-commissioned officers and other ranks of the Belgian Armed Forces for long service. Initially, the medal was created in 2 versions. The version for exceptional service, gallantry or devotion to duty was created by the same royal decree, has the same jewel, but a different ribbon. Currently, both medals still exist, but are considered to be separate awards, not variations of the same award.

== Award criteria ==
Only non-commissioned officers and enlisted personnel are eligible for the award. The second class is awarded to non commissioned officers or enlisted personnel after 10 years of service. 5 years after the award of the second class, one is awarded the first class. Officers are not eligible for the award, but also receive a decoration for long service: the Military Cross. When an individual is awarded both the military decoration and the military cross, only the latter can be worn on the uniform.

== Award description ==
The medal is a gilt cross pattée surmounted by the royal crown of Belgium with four rays between the cross arms. The obverse bears a circular central medallion with a lion and the circular relief inscription "L'UNION FAIT LA FORCE" (STRENGTH IN UNITY). The reverse is identical except for the central medallion, the center bears the royal monogram of the reigning monarch at time of award surrounded by the relief inscription "ARMÉE * MÉRITE * ANCIENNETÉ" ("ARMY * MERIT * SENIORITY"). The medal is suspended by a ring through the suspension loop to a silk moiré ribbon of seventeen alternating longitudinal stripes of red, yellow and black.

== Devices ==
A gilt inverted metal chevron is affixed to the ribbon of the award first class.

Obverse First Class	Obverse Second Class	Common Reverse

== See also ==
- Orders, decorations, and medals of Belgium
