= Marc Compernol =

Chief of Defence Staff of Belgium Defence Force

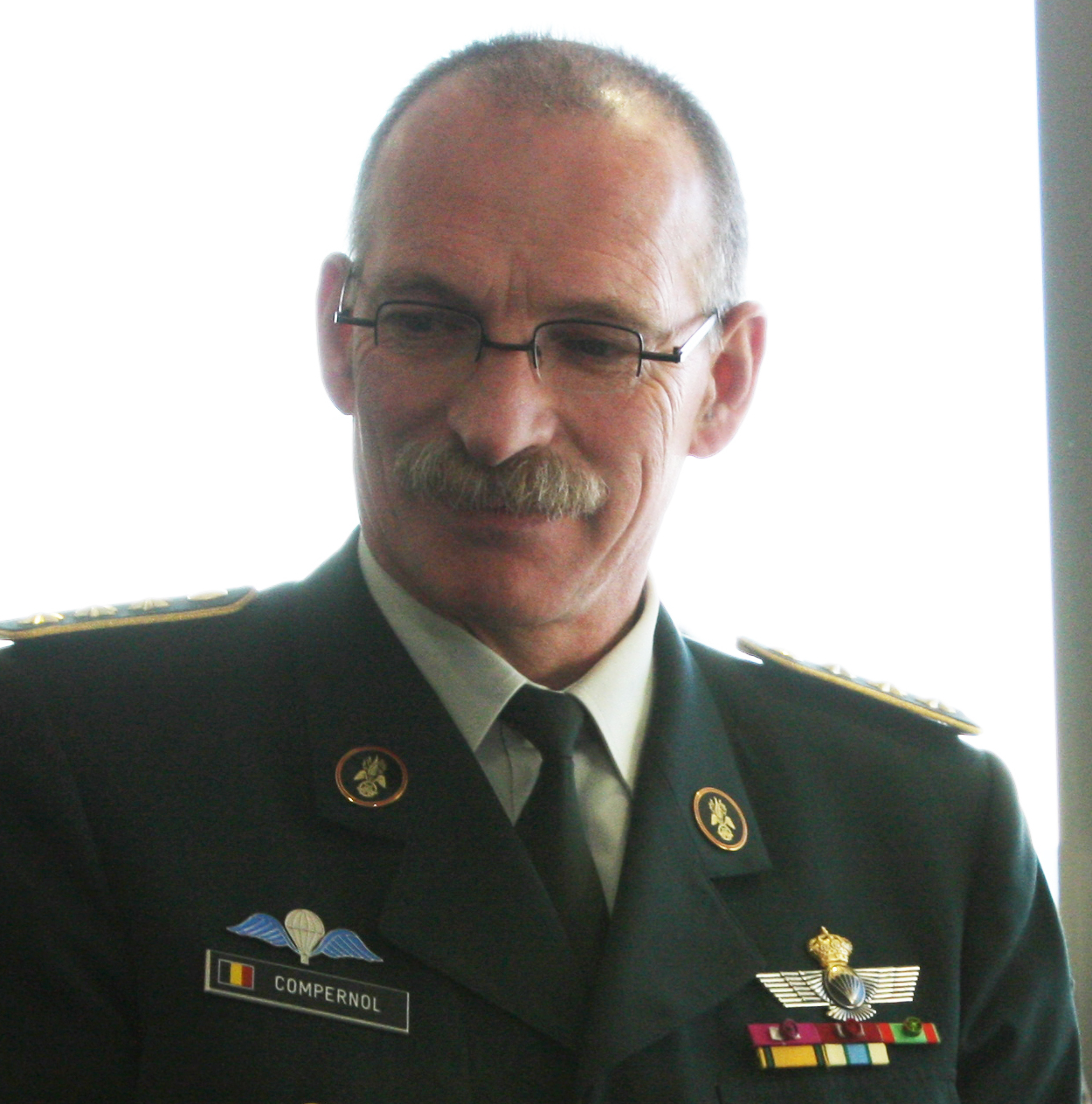

Chief of Defence Staff
- In office 13 July 2016 – 12 July 2020
- Monarch: King Phillip
- Prime Minister: Alexander De Croo
- Preceded by: Air General Gerard Van Caelenberge
- Succeeded by: Admiral Michel Hofman

Commander of Belgian Land Component
- In office 3 September 2009 – 2012

Personal details
- Born: April 8, 1957 (age 69) Bruges, Flemish Region
- Children: 2
- Awards: Order of the Oak Crown (insignia)

Military service
- Allegiance: Belgium
- Branch/service: Belgian Land Component
- Years of service: 1975—2020
- Rank: General
- Unit: Belgian Armed Forces
- Commands: Chief of Defence Staff, Vice Chief of Defence Staff, Assistant Chief of Staff Operations and Training, Belgian Land Component, Synthèse" Division of Army Staff, Deputy Assistant Chief of Staff Operations,

Marc Compernol is the Chief of Defence Staff of the Belgian Armed Forces since July 2016, until his time of retirement in July 2020.

Marc Compernol, a four-star army general was born April 8, 1957, in Bruges, a native of Brasschaat. He entered the army in 1972 after passing out in the Royal Cadet School Laeken in 1975, he went to the Royal Military Academy and graduates with 130th Polytechnic and he also obtained his masters of Mechanics and Ballistics.

He was trained as a field artillery in Brasschaat, he was transferred to serve in the Airborne Field Arty and went on to partake in Sunny Winter operations, ROC together the UNOSOM II where he commands, he was promoted to major in 1996 as the Army Staff, Plans and Programming Division until 1999 when he headed 2nd Regt Field Arty Helchteren, he got promoted to lieutenant colonel in 1997 and rose to be chief of Operational Logistics in the Operational Command of the Army during the early 2000, he also served the Army Staff Synthèse Division as head until 2002 he becisame colonel. Marc Compernol is also a graduate ACSC 28 in Army Command and Staff College Camberley for the high staff course and studies for security, and defence.

== Commands ==
After some years of promotion to colonel, he served beside the assistant Chief of Staff Operations and Training at the Joint Staff was in 2004. He got the promoted to major general and became the deputy assistant Chief of Staff Operations in 2006. He became the Commander of Belgian Land Component (army) and served in September 2009 and a promotion to lieutenant general was followed, he served as assistant Chief of Staff Operations and Training in 2012 and rose to become the deputy head in 2013 and Head of Belgian Defence Force on 13 July 2016 together with promotion to the rank of general.

== Families ==
He married Anne-Laure Debouver, they have two children.

== Awards and decorations ==

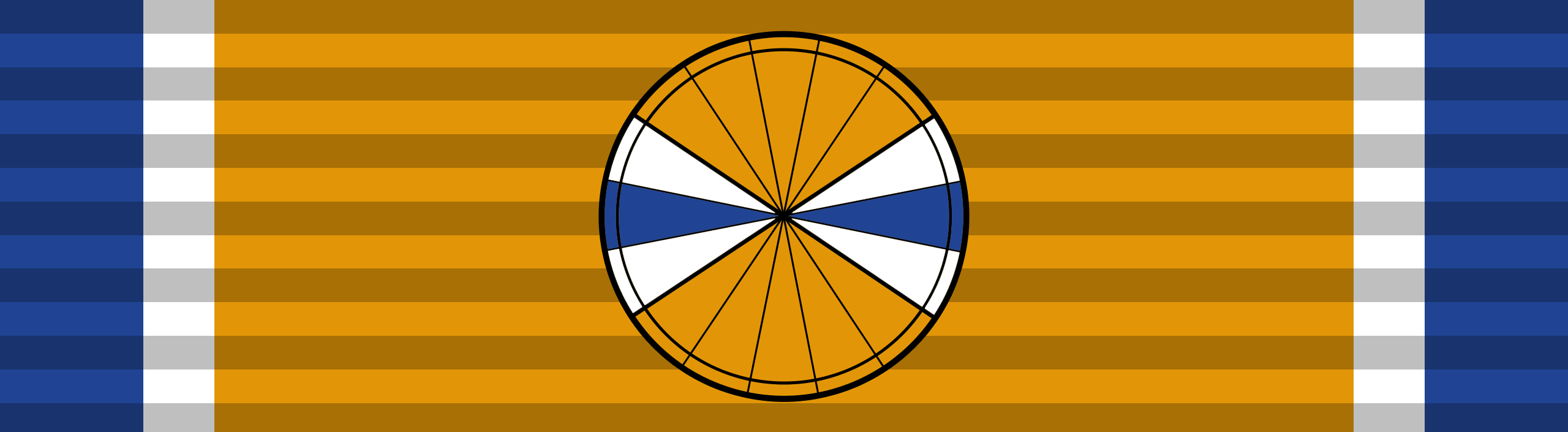

- Grand cross of the order of the crown
- Commander of the order of Leopold
- Military cross, first class
- Legion of merit, commander's degree (United States)
- Officer of the order of Orange-Nassau (Netherlands)
- Officer of the legion of honor (France)
- Medal of the 100th Anniversary of the establishment of the General Staff of the Polish Armed Forces (Poland)
- 100 years of restored Lithuanian armed forces medal (Lithuania)
- United Nations service medal for operation UNOSOM II (United Nations)
