= Commemorative Medal for Armed Humanitarian Operations =

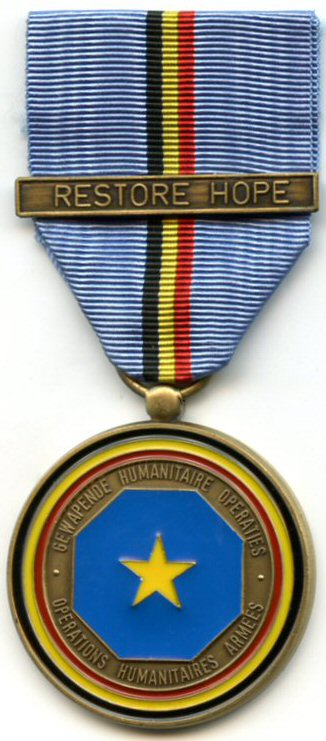
- Commemorative Medal for Armed Humanitarian Operations
- Type: Military decoration
- Awarded for: Participation in armed humanitarian operations
- Presented by: Kingdom of Belgium
- Eligibility: Military and civilian members of the Belgian Defence
- Status: Currently awarded
- Established: 11 September 1987
- Ribbon bar of the Commemorative Medal for Armed Humanitarian Operations

Precedence
- Next (higher): Cross of Honour for Military Service Abroad
- Next (lower): Commemorative Medal for Foreign Operations or Missions

The Commemorative Medal for Armed Humanitarian Operations (Dutch: Herinneringsmedaille voor Gewapende Humanitaire Operaties, French: Médaille commémorative pour opérations humanitaires armées) is a military decoration of Belgium. It was established on 11 September 1987 and is awarded to military and civilian members of the Belgian Armed Forces who participated in armed humanitarian operations. Although never explicitly stated, in practice, the medal is only awarded for a select number of operations on African soil.

== Medal description ==
The medal is circular and struck from bronze, the obverse bears at its center a blue enamelled octagon with a yellow enamelled five-pointed star in the center. Along the outer circumference of the medal are thin enamelled lines of black, yellow and red surrounding the relief inscription "ARMED HUMANITARIAN OPERATIONS" in French: OPÉRATIONS HUMANITAIRES ARMÉES) and in (Dutch: GEWAPENDE HUMANITAIRE OPERATIES). The obverse of the medal is plain. The ribbon is azure blue, with three thin longitudinal in the national colours of Belgium, black, yellow and red.

The ribbon is adorned with small bronze clasps bearing the names of the operations in which the recipient participated.

== Statute ==
The Commemorative Medal for Armed Humanitarian Operations is awarded to military and civilian members of the Belgian Armed Forces who participated in good standing in armed humanitarian operations. The list of the operations for which the medal is awarded was initially included in the Royal Decree creating the medal, which was often amended. Currently, the award of the medal is very rare, but no longer required an amendment to the Royal Decree.

As for the Commemorative Medal for Foreign Operations or Missions, Belgium does not award different medals for each operation. If a person participated in more than one such operation, he or she will be awarded the Commemorative Medal for Armed Humanitarian Operations for each of these operations, each award represented by an additional clasp on the ribbon.

The award of the medal is not automatic. In order to be awarded the medal, one who meets the award conditions has to request it. The medal is awarded by the Human Resources Department of the Belgian Armed Forces. In the period 2009–2013, the Commemorative Medal for Armed Humanitarian Operations was awarded 119 times.

== See also ==
- Orders, decorations, and medals of Belgium
