= Willy Herteleer =

Belgian admiral

Admiral Willy Herteleer

Chief of Defence Belgium
- In office 31 December 2002 – 1 November 1995
- Preceded by: A.L general José Charlier
- Succeeded by: air general. General August Van Daele

Chief of Naval Staff
- In office 1 January 1993 – 1 October 1995

Personal details
- Born: 1 October 1941 (age 84) Assenede, Belgium

Military service
- Allegiance: Belgium
- Branch/service: Belgian Navy
- Years of service: 1962—2003
- Rank: Admiral
- Unit: Chief of the Defence of Belgium, Belgium Navy; Eurodefense-Belgium
- Commands: Chief of Defence of the Kingdom of Belgium, Assistant Chief of Staff Operations and Training, Coastal Minesweeper, Belgium Naval Staff, commander of Officer of the frigate Westdiep, Commander Naval Operations, Assistant Chief of Staff Operations in Naval Operations Command, Deputy Operations Commander, DHQ, Aide-de-Camp to the King, Belgian Navy Commander (Chief of Maritime Defence), chief of Staff Operations Naval Operations Commands, Allied Command Transformation,

Willy Herteleer is an admiral of the Belgium Defence Force who served as the chief of the General Staff of Belgium from 1995 until he left the Navy in 2002.

== Military ==
Willy Herteleer, an admiral of the Navy was born 1 October 1941 in Assenede, Belgium

He enrolled in the Brussels Royal Cadet School in 1957 and in 1960 he attended the Merchant Navy Academy. He was commissioned as a lieutenant in 1962 after attending the academy.

He served in the command ship Godetia in 1963 and until 1968 when he went on to the mine warfare to 1970, at the same year he was moved to Belgian Navy Operational Command as their Mine countermeasures Staff Officer until 1972. He went on to attend the Belgian Staff College, Brussels and later flew to France to Ecole Supérieure de Guerre Navale, Paris, was between 1972 and 1974.

He commanded the Coastal Minesweeper, that was between 1975 until when he was moved to Ocean Minesweeper/Hunter during the summer of 1978 at the same year in Standing Naval Force Channel. He was moved to the Belgian-Dutch Mine warfare School, Ostend as a chief instructor, he became Lieutenant Commander in 1979 serving in Planning Section of the Belgian Naval Staff through which he became member of NATO's Naval Board of the Military Agency of Standardisation until 1982, he was the deputy commander of Officer of the frigate Westdiep was between 1984 and 1985, he later became the assistant chief of staff operations in Naval Operations Command, which was in 1986.

== Commands ==
He became chief of staff operations Naval Operations Commands in September 1987 at the same in the Herald of Free Enterprise rescue operations and in Operations of the First Gulf War, at the rank of captain, he commands Belgian-Dutch Mine Warfare School Osten was between 1987 and until 1989 was the time he introduced the Mine countermeasures operational sea-training and warfare simulator specifications, he was moved to Belgian Naval Staff Brussels during winter of 1989 and until the middle year of 1990 he became staff officer of operations.

He rose to become the commander Naval Operations that was June 1990, he became the head of the Belgian ships during the second Gulf War to freedom of Kuwait until 1992 when he rose up to the rank of rear admiral, he was moved to the General Staff HQ Brussels. He rose to become the chief of Naval Staff effective from 1 January 1993 with a promotion to the rank of vice admiral. He became the chief of the General Staff effective from October 1995 before It was renamed to Chief of Defence Staff in January 2002, a promotion to the rank of admiral was followed 12 days after the renaming of the Defence Staff office, it took effect on 14 January 2002.

He became aide to the King of Belgium between the October 1999, he retired on 1 January 2003 after serving in the both office and reaching the mandatory age limitation regulations. Before becoming the CHODS, he partakes his responsibilities which was Air Campaign Kosovo in 1996 until the summer of 1997 when he was responsible for SFOR and the Central Africa in 2001.

He joined the Allied Command Transformation as a member after retirement, he was their senior concept developer for the Consensus Decision Coherence, he rose to become the president of the Royal Work IBIS in 2005 from which he until 2008, he joined Eurodefense-Belgium for promoting the European Security and Defence concepts.

== Family ==
He is a father of four children and twelve grand children. He later relocated to Ostend where he lives with his family.
