= Armand Crekillie =

Belgian general

Chief of Defence
- In office 15 March 1972 – 31 October 1979
- Preceded by: Baron Georges Vivario
- Succeeded by: Willy Gontier

Personal details
- Born: 1921 Oostende, Belgium
- Died: 11 October 2006 (aged 84–85) Ostend, Belgium

Military service
- Allegiance: Belgium: United Kingdom
- Branch/service: Belgian Air Component
- Years of service: 1941 – 1949, 1949 – 1979
- Rank: lieutenant general
- Unit: North Atlantic Treaty Organization, (1975 – 1976): Royal Air Force, (until 1949); Dutch Air Force, (1949 – 1979)
- Commands: NATO: Chief of the General HQ, Tactical Air Force; 2nd Wings Flying Group

Armand Crekillie (1921 – 2006), was a general in the Belgian Armed Forces, he was Chief of Defence on 15 March 1972 to until 31 October 1979.

Crekillie, a lieutenant general of the Air Force, was born 1921 in Oostende, Belgium, and enrolled in the Belgian Armed Forces as a volunteer in the Great Britain in 1941 through which he enlisted in the section of the Royal Air Force, he became pilot officer in 1943 and of which in 1944, he was made to as flying officer one year after promotion to as flying pilot.

He was moved to the 609 Auxiliary Squadron after a his promotion in 1944 and served 95 war missions onto the Hawker Typhoon until 1945 he was moved to the 349 Squadron, as 1st Wing in 1948, he was promoted to captain in 1949 followed a posting to the Night fighters school as their instructor.

He rose up to be the chief of 2nd Wings Flying group, he was later promoted to lieutenant colonel in 1958 followed a commands in the 2nd Wing base and returned to the Air HQ in 1958, he rose up to be the head of operations in the HQ, he was promoted to colonel in 1964 and became the chief of the Tactical Air Force, he rose to become the deputy chief of the Belgian Air Force for one year of which he was made brigade general in 1969 and follows an appointment to as head of the Tactical Air Force in 1971, he was promoted to lieutenant general in 1972 to which he became the chief of the General HQ on 15 March. He also served as the dean of NATO from 1975 until 1976.

== Death ==
He died 11 October 2006 in Oostende, Belgium.

== Decorations ==
- Croix de guerre 1940 avec palmes
