= Commemorative Medal for Missions or Operations regarding the operational defense of the territory =

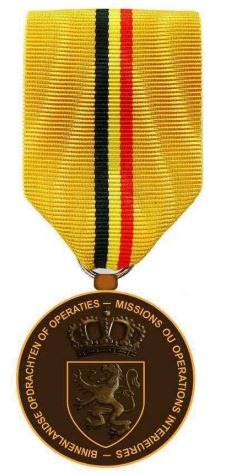
- Obverse of the Belgian commemorative medal for Missions or Operations regarding the operational defense of the territory
- Type: Military decoration
- Awarded for: Participation in operations or missions regarding the operational defense of the territory
- Presented by: Kingdom of Belgium
- Eligibility: Military and civilian members of the Belgian Armed Forces
- Status: Active
- Established: 28 March 2018
- ribbon bar

Precedence
- Next (higher): Commemorative Medal for Foreign Operations or Missions
- Next (lower): Meritorious Service Medal

The Commemorative Medal for Missions or Operations regarding the operational defense of the territory (Dutch: herinneringsmedaille voor de opdrachten of operaties met betrekking tot de operationele verdediging van het grondgebied, French: Médaille commémorative pour les missions ou opérations relatives à la défense opérationnelle du territoire) is a military decoration of Belgium. It was established on 28 March 2018 and is awarded to military and civilian members of the Belgian Armed Forces who participated in operations related to the defense of the Belgian territory or who provided specialized support to such operations.

== History ==
The medal, established on 28 March 2018, was first awarded to military personnel having served in Operation Vigilant Guardian during a military parade organized on the Grand Place of Brussels and attended by several high-ranking officials, such as the secretary of Defence, the Chief of Defence, the mayor of Brussels and several high ranking Belgian officers.

With the creation of the medal, the Belgian government abolished the former rule that military commemorative medals had to be bought by the recipient. Formerly, the recipient received only a brevet, allowing him to purchase the medal in a military store. With the creation of this medal, the government now provides for military commemorative medals.

== Insignia ==
The medal is circular and is struck from bronze, the obverse bears the Escutcheon-only version of the Coat of arms of Belgium under the royal crown and surrounded by the text MISSIONS OU OPERATIONS INTERIEURES BINNENLANDSE OPDRACHTEN OF OPERATIES. The reverse of the medal bears a laurel crown along the outer circumference. The blank area within the wreath may be used to engrave the recipients' name and date of the award. The ribbon is golden with three thin longitudinal stripes of black, yellow and red in the middle.

The ribbon is adorned with an Arabic numeral (9 mm by 6 mm) that denotes the number of operations or missions the recipient has participated in.

Obverse

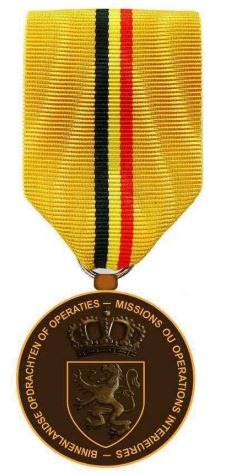

Reverse

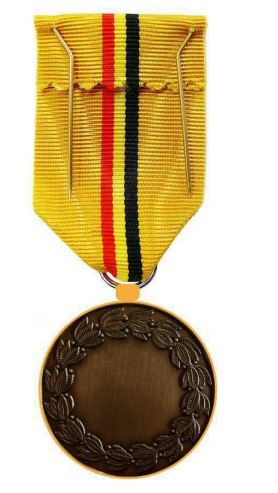

== Award conditions ==
The medal is awarded to military and civilian members of the Belgian Armed Forces who participated in operations related to the defense of the Belgian territory or who provided specialized support to such operations for a minimum duration of 30 days. In order to be eligible for the award, personnel must have shown exemplary behaviour during the operation.

For each additional service period of 90 days, the recipient is awarded a subsequent medal, allowing him to attach a bronze Arabic number to the ribbon of the medal. The medal is awarded regardless of service period to personnel that got severely injured during the operation or died of wounds directly attributable to the operation. When the award conditions have been met with, a request must be made either by the eligible person or by his command.

== See also ==
- Orders, decorations, and medals of Belgium
