= Chief of Defence (Belgium) =

Professional head and commander of the Belgian Armed Forces

- Chef Defensie (Dutch); Chef de la Défense (French)
- Incumbent; General Frederik Vansina since 4 July 2024
- Ministry of Defence
- Type: Chief of Defence
- Member of: Belgian Armed Forces
- Reports to: Minister of Defence
- Formation: 28 February 1958
- First holder: Lieutenant-General Jacques de Clarcq

The Chief of Defence (Dutch: Chef Defensie; French: Chef de la Défense, abbreviated as CHOD), is the professional head and commander of the Belgian Armed Forces. He is the highest official within the Ministry of Defence and the Chief of the Defence Staff. He reports directly to the Minister of Defence and is responsible for advising the Minister, for the implementation of defence policy and for the administration of the department. The current Chief of Defence is General Frederik Vansina, since July 2024.

== Chiefs of Staff (1958−present) ==
No.	Portrait	Chief of Staff	Took office	Left office	Time in office	Defence branch	Ref.
1	Jacques de Clarcq	Lieutenant General; Jacques de Clarcq	28 February 1958	30 November 1959	1 year, 275 days	Belgian Land Component	–
2	Baron Charles Paul de Cumont	Lieutenant General; Baron Charles Paul de Cumont (1902–1990)	9 December 1959	30 June 1963	3 years, 203 days	Belgian Land Component	–
3	G. Wagner	Lieutenant General; G. Wagner	1 July 1963	31 March 1965	1 year, 273 days	Belgian Land Component	–
4	V. Dessart	Lieutenant General; V. Dessart	1 April 1965	31 March 1968	2 years, 365 days	Belgian Land Component	–
5	Baron Georges Vivario	Lieutenant General; Baron Georges Vivario (1910–1990)	1 April 1968	14 March 1972	3 years, 348 days	Belgian Land Component	–
6	Armand Crekillie	Lieutenant General; Armand Crekillie (1922–2006)	15 March 1972	31 October 1979	7 years, 230 days	Belgian Air Component	–
7	Willy Gontier	Lieutenant General; Willy Gontier	1 November 1979	30 September 1982	2 years, 334 days	Belgian Land Component	–
8	Baron Maurice Gysemberg [fr]	Lieutenant General; Baron Maurice Gysemberg (1927–2001)	1 October 1982	21 July 1988	5 years, 265 days	Belgian Land Component	–
9	José Charlier	Lieutenant General; José Charlier (born 1934)	22 July 1988	30 September 1995	7 years, 71 days	Belgian Land Component	–
10	Willy Herteleer	Admiral; Willy Herteleer (born 1941)	1 November 1995	31 December 2002	7 years, 91 days	Belgian Navy	–
11	August Van Daele [nl]	General; August Van Daele (1944–2017)	1 January 2003	1 April 2009	6 years, 90 days	Belgian Air Component	–
12	Charles-Henri Delcour [nl]	General; Charles-Henri Delcour (born 1948)	2 April 2009	29 March 2012	2 years, 363 days	Belgian Land Component	–
13	Gerard Van Caelenberge	General; Gerard Van Caelenberge (born 1952)	13 July 2012	13 July 2016	4 years, 0 days	Belgian Air Component	–
14	Marc Compernol	General; Marc Compernol (born 1957)	13 July 2016	10 July 2020	3 years, 363 days	Belgian Land Component	–
15	Michel Hofman	Admiral; Michel Hofman (born 1961)	10 July 2020	4 July 2024	3 years, 360 days	Belgian Navy	
16	Frederik Vansina	General; Frederik Vansina (born 1964)	4 July 2024	Incumbent	2 years, 65 days	Belgian Air Component	
