= Meritorious Service Medal (Belgium) =

Meritorious service medal
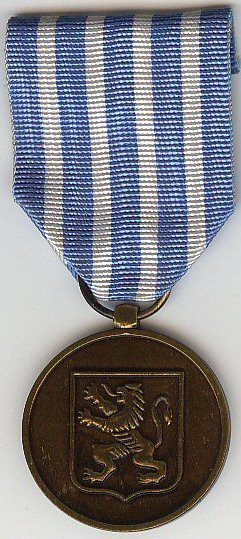
- Meritorious Service Medal (obverse)
- Type: Medal
- Awarded for: Exemplary behaviour or act
- Presented by: Kingdom of Belgium
- Eligibility: Personnel of the Belgian Armed Forces or personnel of non-Belgian Armed Forces
- Status: Active
- Established: 25 February 2005
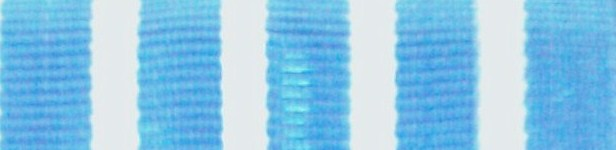
- Ribbon

Precedence
- Next (higher): Commemorative Medal for Missions or Operations regarding the operational defense of the territory
- Next (lower): Commemorative Medals for Army Marches

The Meritorious service medal for personnel of the Belgian Defence Forces and Foreign Armed Forces (Dutch: Medaille van Verdienste ten gunste van de personeelsleden van defensie en van vreemde legers, French: Médaille du Mérite en faveur des membres du personnel de la défense et d’armées étrangères) is a military decoration of Belgium. It was established on 23 February 2005 as a more rewarding successor of an earlier Medal of Military Merit (created in 1988) and is awarded to members of the Belgian Armed Forces and civilians working for the Belgian Defence who show an exemplary meritorious behaviour in the completion of their duties or who have accomplished an exemplary meritorious act.

The medal may also be awarded to foreign military and civilian members of a foreign Armed Force who have provided exceptional support to the Belgian Defence.

The Meritorious service medal is awarded by royal decree.

== History ==
The original Medal for Military Merit was created in 1988 by ministerial decree and awarded internally within the Ministry of Defence. However, the creation of the medal was presented to the Council of State under the form of a ministerial decree and the Council ruled that the creation of such an award should be done by the King, thus via a Royal Decree. Therefore a new Meritorious Service Medal with a slightly different official name was created in its place in 2005, that was to be awarded by the King of Belgium. As the original Medal for Military Merit had already been awarded a number of times, the Royal Decree provided retroactively that the original medal is to be considered as equivalent to the new one.

== Award Criteria ==
=== Belgian Military Personnel ===
The Meritorious Service Medal is awarded by the King based on a proposal from the Secretary of Defence, the Chief of Defence or an officer with the authority of Corps Commander or above, for award to a person who:

- is more productive than most of their colleagues;
- tries to achieve perfection in their daily work;
- has on their own initiative achieved something to the benefit of the Belgian Armed Forces;
- has not had any previous penal or disciplinary sanctions;
- behaves in an exemplary manner; and
- takes into account human and social issues in their work.

One cannot be awarded the Meritorious Service Medal if one has already been awarded the Civic Decoration, the Military Decoration for gallantry or exceptional devotion or the medal of the Carnegie Hero Fund for the same acts.

Award ceremonies are usually held only once a year, the medal is rare, with barely four to eleven yearly recipients. In the period 2009-2013, the Medal for Military Merit was awarded 55 times. The medal can only be awarded once to the same individual. When personnel receives a severe punishment, multiple light punishments or when they act in a way that is deemed unbecoming and has been punished accordingly, the King can revoke the award of the meritorious service medal.

=== Personnel of Non-Belgian Armed Forces ===
The meritorious service medal may be awarded to military and civilian personnel of non-Belgian armed forces when they have collaborated exceptionally with and provided extraordinary support to the Belgian Defence. The Belgian regulation stipulate explicitly that such an award is exceptional. In order to receive the award, the awardee must:

- Be in active duty at the time of the act
- Not have been awarded the medal of the Carnegie Hero Fund or the Civic Decoration for the same acts

The award of the medal to a foreign service member can be done by:

- The Belgian Secretary of Defence
- The Belgian Chief of Defence
- A Belgian Commanding Officer in a multinational service, including in a foreign operation theatre.
- A Commanding Officer of a combat branch or major staff

== Appearance ==
The medal is circular and struck from bronze, the obverse bears the Escutcheon-only version of the Coat of arms of Belgium, the plain reverse usually bears the engraved name of the recipient and date of the award. The medal is suspended to the ribbon by a ring though the suspension loop. The ribbon is light blue with four vertical white stripes. The original Medal for Military Merit had the same design and hung from the same ribbon as the new one, only the statute differs.

== Recipients (partial list) ==
- Lieutenant Yves Bertholet
- Sergeant Yoann Severijns
- Master Corporal J.-P. Doyen
- Warrant Officer G. Verlent
- Master Warrant Officer G. Lenders
- Chief Warrant Officer P. Istas
- First Sergeant-Major Jozef Van Lancker
- Corporal D. Tricot
- Major I. Dupont
- First Master Corporal Bruno Coenen
- Warrant Officer Pascal Blanchart
- Master Corporal Sean Vereecken
- Major Danny Snelders
- Chief Warrant Officer Stefaan Mouton
- Lieutenant Luc Gille
- Private First Class Timothy De Mars
- Master Warrant Officer Patrick Vermeulen

== Foreign recipients ==
- Brigadier General Philippe Léonard (France)
- Colonel Mark E. Carter (USA)
- Major Anthony F. Sidoti (USA)

== See also ==
- Orders, decorations, and medals of Belgium
- List of Medal of Military Merit (Belgium) recipients

== Other sources ==
- Quinot H., 1950, Recueil illustré des décorations belges et congolaises, 4e Edition. (Hasselt)
- Cornet R., 1982, Recueil des dispositions légales et réglementaires régissant les ordres nationaux belges. 2e Ed. N.pl., (Brussels)
- Borné A.C., 1985, Distinctions honorifiques de la Belgique, 1830-1985 (Brussels)
- Belgian military regulation DGHR-REG-DISPSYS-001 of 20 February 2006
- Belgian military regulation DGHR-SPS-DECOR-001 of 18 January 2006
- Report of written questions and answers in the Belgian House of Representatives, 17 March 2014 (QRVA 53-152)
