= Order of Leopold II =

Order of Belgium

Order of Leopold II Ordre de Léopold II Orde van Leopold II
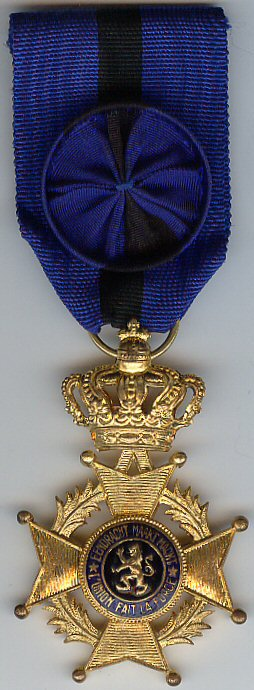
- Officer's cross of the Order of Leopold II

Awarded by King of the Belgians
- Type: Order of Merit with five classes and three medals
- Established: 24 August 1900; 1900 – 1908 (Order of Congo); 1908 – present (as Belgian Order)
- Motto: EENDRACHT MAAKT MACHT - L'UNION FAIT LA FORCE
- Eligibility: Eligible for persons above the age of 42
- Awarded for: Bravery in combat or meritorious service
- Status: Currently constituted
- Grand Master: His Majesty King Philippe
- Grades: Grand Cross; Grand Officer; Commander; Officer; Knight

Precedence
- Next (higher): Order of the Crown
- Next (lower): Military Decoration for gallantry or exceptional devotion

The Order of Leopold II is an order of Belgium and is named in honor of King Leopold II. The decoration was established on 24 August 1900 by Leopold II as Sovereign of the Congo Free State and was in 1908, upon Congo being handed over to Belgium, incorporated into the Belgian awards system. The order is awarded for meritorious service to the sovereign of Belgium, and as a token of his personal goodwill. It can be awarded to both Belgians and foreigners, and is seen as diplomatic gift of merit.

The order has become a long service order for people in the civil service and is awarded alternatively with the Order of the Crown, as the Order of Leopold is awarded under rarer circumstances. The order currently stands third after the Order of Leopold (1st) and the Order of the Crown (2nd) in the Belgian honors hierarchy. The Order of Leopold II is awarded by royal decree.

== Classes ==
The Order of Leopold II is issued in five classes and three medals:

- Grand Cross, who wears the badge on a sash on the right shoulder, plus a plaque on the left chest;
- Grand Officer, who wears only a plaque on the left chest;
- Commander, who wears the badge on a necklet;
- Officer, who wears the badge on a ribbon with rosette on the left chest;
- Knight, who wears the badge on a ribbon on the left chest;
- Gold Medal, who wears the medal on the left chest;
- Silver Medal, who wears the medal on the left chest;
- Bronze Medal, who wears the medal on the left chest.

== Insignia ==
- The badge of the Order is a metal Maltese Cross, in silver for the Knight class and in gold for the higher classes, with a wreath of laurel leaves of the same metal between the arms of the cross. The obverse central disc features a lion on a black enamel background surrounded by a blue enamel ring with the motto "Unity Is Strength" in French (L'union fait la force) and in Dutch (Eendracht maakt macht). The badge is topped by a crown of the same metal. Up to the inclusion of the Order of Leoplold II in the Belgian National Orders, the central disk showed an enamelled blue, black and white coat of arms of the Congo Free State and the motto Travail et Progrès.
- The plaque for Grand Cross is a faceted silver five-pointed star with golden rays between the branches of the star. The centre shows the obverse of a commander's cross. The plaque for Grand Officer is a faceted five-armed 'Maltese Asterisk' (see Maltese Cross), with golden rays between the arms. The centre shows the obverse of an officer's cross.
- The medal shows the shape of the Order badge imprinted in a metal shape that is vaguely octagonal and looks like a closed florian cross. The metal of the Medal is gold for the gold medal, Silver for the silver medal and Bronze for the bronze medal.
- The ribbon of the Order is blue with a central black stripe. However, if the Order is awarded in special circumstances, the ribbon of the Officer and Knight classes show the following variations:
  - Crossed swords are added to the ribbon when awarded in wartime (if the Order was awarded during the Second World War or during the Korean War, a small bar is added to the ribbon mentioning the name of the war);
  - The ribbon has a vertical gold border on both sides when awarded for a special act of valour;
  - The ribbon has a central vertical gold stripe in the middle of the black stripe when awarded for an exceptionally meritorious act;
  - A gold star is added to the ribbon when the recipient has been mentioned in despatches at the national level;
  - Silver or gold palms are added to the ribbon when awarded in wartime to military personnel.

Stars and borders or stripes can be awarded together, but these deviations are currently only rarely awarded.

Originally, the central stripe of the ribbon was white, as blue and white were the colours of the Congo Free State.

The ribbon bar of the order, which is worn on the semi-formal dress uniform is:

Ribbon bars
| Grand Cross | Grand Officer | Commander | Officer | Knight |
| | Gold Medal | Silver Medal | Bronze Medal | |

Despite the fact that, contrary to the Order of Leopold, no maritime or military divisions of the Order of Leopold II exist, some unofficial decorations with crossed anchors or crossed swords under the suspension crown are known to exist.

== Award conditions ==
=== Current award conditions of Belgian national orders ===
National Orders are awarded by Royal Decree at fixed dates: 8 April (Birthday of King Albert I), 15 November (King's Feast), and in some cases on 21 July (Belgian national holiday)) to reward meritorious services to the Kingdom of Belgium based on the career path and age of the recipient. A number of different regulations rule the award of National Order for the various ministries. In addition, the National Orders may be awarded by the King for especially meritorious deeds. The Royal Decrees are published in the Belgian Official Journal (Moniteur Belge).

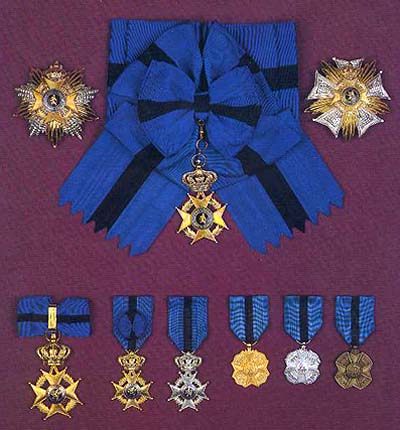
Top left and center: Grand Cross' plaque and sash, top right: Grand Officer's plaque, bottom, from left to right: Commander's cross, Officer's cross, Knight's cross, Gold Medal, Silver Medal, Bronze Medal (courtesy Société de l'Ordre de Léopold)

The Minister responsible for Foreign Affairs, currently the Federal Public Service (SPF/FOD) Foreign Affairs, administers the national orders and has a role of advisor in cases not fitting within a regulation.

For the award of National Orders for persons to which no regulation apply or has been adopted, the number of awards is limited every year by decision of the Council of Ministers (contingent).

The classes of the National Orders are integrated in a combined hierarchy defined by law, whereby within one class the Order of Leopold is senior to the Order of the Crown, which is senior to the Order of Leopold II. One cannot be awarded a National Order at a level below the highest that the recipient has already received.

People who are the subject of criminal proceedings will usually not be awarded a National Order until they are declared not guilty.

=== Award conditions to military personnel ===
The Order of Leopold II is mostly awarded to military personnel on the basis of their length of service, although exceptions to that rule exist where the order is presented to military personnel for exceptional or meritorious service. (e.g. awards to officers or non-commissioned officers for devoted service to His Majesy the King). When officers are considered for the award based on their length of service, their years of service in a non-officer's rank count for half. The first twelve years of service as a member of the flying personnel counts double.

- Grand Officer: Awarded at the time of retirement to a major-general having a minimum of 40 years of meritorious service;
- Commander: Awarded after 30 years of meritorious service to a field officer member of the flying personnel with minimum rank of lieutenant-colonel, or at the time of retirement to other field officers with minimum rank of lieutenant-colonel having a minimum of 30 years of meritorious service;
- Officer: Awarded after 22 years of meritorious service to a commissioned officer member of the flying personnel with minimum rank of captain, or at the time of retirement to other commissioned officers with minimum rank of captain having between 20 and 25 years of meritorious service;
- Knight: Awarded after 13 years of meritorious service to a commissioned officer member of the flying personnel, after 30 years of meritorious service for a non-commissioned officer (13 years for non-commissioned officers member of the flying personnel), and after 40 years of service for a private or corporal;
- Gold Medal: Awarded after 20 years of meritorious service to a non-commissioned officer (9 years for non-commissioned officers member of the flying personnel), and after 25 years of service for a private or corporal;
- Silver Medal: Awarded after 20 years of meritorious service for a private or corporal.

For awards to military personnel, there is no minimum age requirement.

For commissioned officers not members of the flying personnel, the Order of Leopold II is only awarded at the time of retirement, even if it is in fact earned before that in line with the rules presented above. Even then, because of the generic rule that one cannot be awarded a National Order at a level below the highest that the recipient has already received, the Order of Leopold II will not be awarded if the recipient has been awarded in the meantime a higher National Order than the Order of Leopold II at the Class he could receive. This apparent anomaly is due to the fact that King Albert I, who was fond of aviation, wanted to provide a special reward to aircraft pilots, and therefore ordered that the Order of Leopold II only be awarded to them. In its early days, the Order of Leopold II awarded to pilots was adorned with a bar for every one hundred hours flown (a practice currently discontinued).

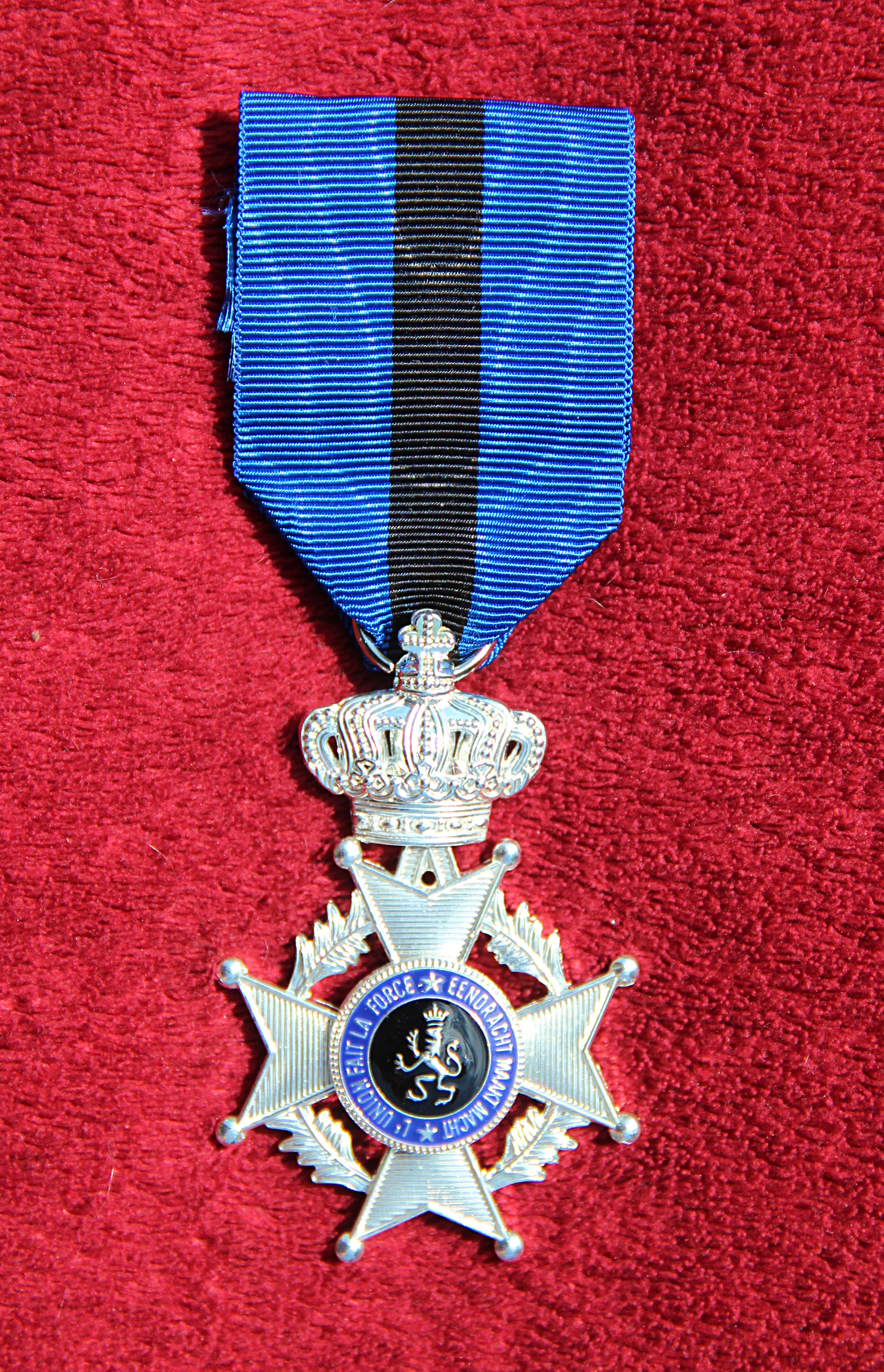
Knight's Medal of the Order of Leopold II.

The Order of Leopold II is also sometimes awarded to military personnel not meeting the conditions above when they have performed especially meritorious services to the King that do not deserve a special award of the Order of Leopold. This is in particular the case for commissioned officers who have been adjutant to the King or Crown Prince (usually a part-time position for a few especially selected Major), who are usually awarded the Order at the rank of commander.

=== Award conditions for long civilian service ===
The Knight's Cross of the Order of Leopold II is awarded to the presidents, secretaries and members of the board of directors of the largest representative trade organisations such as trade unions on the basis of the number of members of the organisation, of the length of their membership of the board, and on the length of their tenure within the board.

The Knight's Cross of the Order of Leopold II is also awarded, after a tenure of 10 years, to the members of the provincial committees for the promotion of labour who have reached the age of 42.

== See also ==
- Grand Masters : Leopold II - Albert I - Leopold III - Baudouin - Albert II - Philippe
- Order of Leopold
- Order of the African Star
- Royal Order of the Lion
- Order of the Crown
- List of civil awards and decorations
- List of Belgian military decorations
- Category:Recipients of the Order of Leopold II
