= Military Decoration for gallantry or exceptional devotion =

Military Decoration
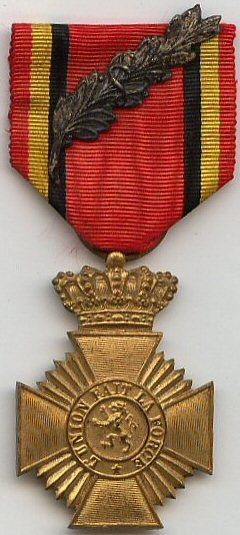
- Military Decoration for gallantry ribbon with palm
- Type: Military decoration
- Awarded for: Exceptional service, acts of heroism or exceptional devotion to duty.
- Eligibility: Military personnel of the Belgian Armed Forces
- Status: Active
- Established: December 22, 1873
- Final award: December 21, 2022 (72 awards to servicemen who participated in operation Red Kite)
- Ribbon

Precedence
- Next (higher): Order of Leopold II
- Next (lower): Military Cross (Belgium)

The Military Decoration for Exceptional Service or Acts of Courage or Devotion (Dutch: Militair ereteken voor buitengewone dienst of voor daad van moed of toewijding French: Décoration militaire pour service exceptionnel ou acte de courage ou de dévouement) is awarded to personnel of the Belgian Armed Forces for either displayed herorism or for display of extraordinary devotion to duty. In history, sometimes it is referred to as an 'Article 4' award, as originally, the medal was created as a variation of the military decoration for long service. However, nowadays, both medals are distinct awards, albeit still having the same guilt cross.

== Award criteria ==
During both World wars, the medal was almost exclusively awarded for acts of bravery and thus extremely rare. In the period 2009-2013, the Military Decoration for Exceptional Service or Acts of Courage or Devotion second class was awarded 58 times. During the same period, the Military Decoration for Exceptional Service or Acts of Courage or Devotion first class was not awarded. Presently, the award of the medal is a bit more common as it is more often awarded for exceptional service. Examples of awards for exceptional service are the automatic award of the medal to navy personnel below the rank of officer for 20 years of service on board of Navy vessels or the award of 72 medals to military personnel engaged in the Non Combatant Evacuation Operation (NEO) Red Kite in 2021. The medal can be awarded in 2 classes. Usually, only the second class of the medal is awarded. The first class of the medal is awarded for very exceptional heroism or devotion. Only commissioned and non-commissioned officers are eligible to the first class of the medal.

== Award description ==
The medal is a gilt cross pattée surmounted by the royal crown of Belgium with four rays between the cross arms. The obverse bears a circular central medallion with a lion and the circular relief inscription "L'UNION FAIT LA FORCE" (STRENGTH IN UNITY). The reverse is identical except for the central medallion, the center bears the royal monogram of the reigning monarch at time of award surrounded by the relief inscription "ARMÉE * MÉRITE * ANCIENNETÉ" ("ARMY * MERIT * SENIORITY"). It hangs from a red silk moiré ribbon with narrow longitudinal gold and black stripes near the edges.

== Devices ==
An inverted gilt chevron is worn on the ribbon, denoting award of the medal "first class". During the World Wars, the medal was sometimes awarded with a silver palm, worn on the ribbon denoting awards during wartime. The silver palm device is currently obsolete.

First Class Obverse	Second Class with palm Obverse

== Rejected decorations for efforts against terrorist attacks on March 22 ==
On 22 March 2016, two coordinated terrorist attacks in Belgium, were carried out by the Islamic State (IS). Two suicide bombers detonated bombs at Brussels Airport in Zaventem, and one detonated a bomb on a train leaving Maalbeek/Maelbeek metro station in central Brussels. Twentynine servicemen who were at that moment at the airport started immediately after the explosions to secure the area and to evacuate the people and took care of the victims. Seven other soldiers who were patrolling went to Maelbeek metro station in search of survivors and participated in the evacuation of the station. All of them submitted a request to get the Military Decoration for Exceptional Service or Acts of Courage or Devotion, with the support of their chefs but the army command denied the request because, as stated, 'We don't want to encourage a cult of heroes at Defense'.

== See also ==
- Orders, decorations, and medals of Belgium
- Belgian honours order of wearing
