= Commemorative Medal for Foreign Operations or Missions =

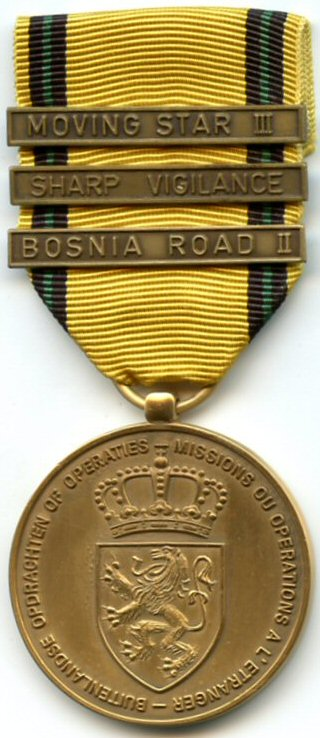
- Commemorative Medal for Foreign Operations or Missions
- Type: Military decoration
- Awarded for: Participation in operations or missions outside of the territory of Belgium
- Presented by: Kingdom of Belgium
- Eligibility: Military and civilian members of the Belgian Armed Forces
- Status: Active
- Established: 13 April 1993
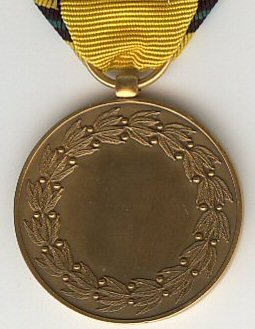
- Reverse Ribbon bar

Precedence
- Next (higher): Commemorative Medal for Armed Humanitarian Operations
- Next (lower): Commemorative Medal for Missions or Operations regarding the operational defense of the territory

The Commemorative Medal for Foreign Operations or Missions (Dutch: Herinneringsmedaille voor Buitenlandse Opdrachten of Operaties, French: Médaille Commémorative pour Missions ou Opérations à l'Étranger) is a military decoration of Belgium. It was established on 13 April 1993 and is awarded to military and civilian members of the Belgian Armed Forces who participated in operations or missions outside of the territory of Belgium.

== Insignia ==
The medal is circular and is struck from bronze, the obverse bears the Escutcheon-only version of the Coat of arms of Belgium under the royal crown and surrounded by the text Missions ou opérations à l'étranger - Buitenlandse opdrachten of operaties. The reverse of the medal bears a laurel crown along the outer circumference. The blank area within the wreath may be used to engrave the recipients' name and date of the award. The ribbon is golden with three thin longitudinal stripes of black, green and black near the outer edges.

The ribbon is adorned with an Arabic numeral that denotes the number of operations or missions the recipient has participated in. Prior to 2004, the various operations or missions the recipient had participated in were denoted by small bronze clasps bearing the name of the operation or mission like for the Commemorative Medal for Armed Humanitarian Operations.

== Award conditions ==
The Commemorative Medal for Foreign Operations or Missions is awarded to military and civilian members of the Belgian Armed Forces who participated in good standing, in humanitarian, peacekeeping, peace enforcement or international security operations or missions outside the territory of Belgium for a minimum duration of one month. The list of the operations for which the medal is awarded is included in a separate Ministerial Decree (see references), which is amended on a regular basis.

As for the Commemorative Medal for Armed Humanitarian Operations, Belgium does not award different medals for each operation. If a person participated in more than one such operation, they receive the Commemorative Medal for Foreign Operation or Mission for each of these operations, the number of award being represented by the number displayed on the ribbon.

The award of the medal is not automatic. In order to be awarded the medal, one meeting the award prerequisites must request it. The medal is awarded by the Human Resources Department of the Belgian Armed Forces. In the period 2009-2013, the Commemorative Medal for Foreign Operation or Mission was awarded 12,659 times.

== See also ==
- Orders, decorations, and medals of Belgium
