= Belgian military ranks =

The Belgian military ranks are the military insignia used by the Belgian Armed Forces.

== Commissioned officer ranks ==
The rank insignia of commissioned officers.

NATO code	OF-10	OF-9	OF-8	OF-7	OF-6	OF-5	OF-4	OF-3		OF-2	OF-1
Rank group (NL)	Opperofficieren					Hoofdofficieren			Lagere officieren
Rank group (FR)	Officiers généraux					Officiers supérieurs			Officiers subalternes
Rank group (DE)	Generäle					Stabsoffiziere			Subalternoffiziere
Belgian Land Component
Belgian Land Component		Generaal	Luitenant-generaal	Generaal-majoor	Brigadegeneraal	Kolonel	Luitenant-kolonel	Majoor	Kapitein-commandant	Kapitein	Luitenant	Onderluitenant
Belgian Land Component		Général	Lieutenant général	Général-major	Général de Brigade	Colonel	Lieutenant-colonel	Major	Capitaine-commandant	Capitaine	Lieutenant	Sous-lieutenant
Belgian Land Component		General	Generalleutnant	Generalmajor	Brigadegeneral	Oberst	Oberstleutnant	Major	Stabshauptmann	Hauptmann	Leutnant	Unterleutnant
Belgian Navy
Belgian Navy		Admiraal	Vice-admiraal	Divisieadmiraal	Flottieljeadmiraal	Kapitein-ter-zee	Fregatkapitein	Korvetkapitein	Luitenant-ter-zee 1ste klasse	Luitenant-ter-zee	Vaandrig-ter-zee	Vaandrig-ter-zee 2de klasse
Belgian Navy		Amiral	Vice-amiral	Amiral de division	Amiral de flottille	Capitaine de vaisseau	Capitaine de frégate	Capitaine de corvette	Lieutenant de vaisseau de 1^{re} classe	Lieutenant de vaisseau	Enseigne de vaisseau	Enseigne de vaisseau de 2^{e} classe
Belgian Navy		Admiral	Vizeadmiral	Divisionsadmiral	Flotillenadmiral	Kapitän zur See	Fregattenkapitän	Korvettenkapitän	Linienschiffsleutnant 1. klasse	Linienschiffsleutnant	Seefahnrich	Seefahnrich 2. klasse
Belgian Air Component
Belgian Air Component		Generaal	Luitenant-generaal	Generaal-majoor	Brigadegeneraal	Kolonel	Luitenant-kolonel	Majoor	Kapitein-commandant	Kapitein	Luitenant	Onderluitenant
Belgian Air Component		Général	Lieutenant général	Général-major	Général de Brigade	Colonel	Lieutenant-colonel	Major	Capitaine-commandant	Capitaine	Lieutenant	Sous-lieutenant
Belgian Air Component		General	Generalleutnant	Generalmajor	Brigadegeneral	Oberst	Oberstleutnant	Major	Stabshauptmann	Hauptmann	Leutnant	Unterleutnant
(Belgium) Belgian Medical Service
(Belgium) Belgian Medical Service		Generaal	Luitenant-generaal	Generaal-majoor	Brigadegeneraal	Kolonel	Luitenant-kolonel	Majoor	Kapitein-commandant	Kapitein	Luitenant	Onderluitenant
(Belgium) Belgian Medical Service		Général	Lieutenant général	Général-major	Général de Brigade	Colonel	Lieutenant-colonel	Major	Capitaine-commandant	Capitaine	Lieutenant	Sous-lieutenant
(Belgium) Belgian Medical Service		General	Generalleutnant	Generalmajor	Brigadegeneral	Oberst	Oberstleutnant	Major	Stabshauptmann	Hauptmann	Leutnant	Unterleutnant
NATO code	OF-10	OF-9	OF-8	OF-7	OF-6	OF-5	OF-4	OF-3		OF-2	OF-1

=== Ranks at the Royal Military Academy ===
Rank group	Officer-Students (Master)	Student-Officers (Bachelor)
Year	5th and 4th	3rd and 2nd	1st
Belgian Army
Belgian Army	Onderluitenant KBO	Adjudant KBO	Sergeant KBO	Korporaal KBO	Soldaat KBO
Belgian Army	Sous-lieutenant COC	Adjudant COC	Sergent COC	Caporal COC	Soldat COC
Belgian Army	Unterleutnant	Adjudant	Sergeant	Korporal	Soldat
Belgian Navy
Belgian Navy	Vaandrig-ter-zee 2e klasse KBO	1e meester-chef KBO	Sergeant KBO	Korporaal KBO	Soldaat KBO
Belgian Navy	Enseigne de vaisseau de 2e classe COC	Premier maître-chef COC	Sergent COC	Caporal COC	Soldat COC
Belgian Navy	Seefahnrich 2. klasse	Erster Chefmeister	Sergeant	Korporal	Soldat
Belgian Air Force
Belgian Air Force	Onderluitenant KBO	Adjudant KBO	Sergeant KBO	Korporaal KBO	Soldaat KBO
Belgian Air Force	Sous-lieutenant COC	Adjudant COC	Sergent COC	Caporal COC	Soldat COC
Belgian Air Force	Unterleutnant	Adjudant	Sergeant	Korporal	Soldat
Belgian Medical Service
Belgian Medical Service	Onderluitenant KBO	Adjudant KBO	Sergeant KBO	Korporaal KBO	Soldaat KBO
Belgian Medical Service	Sous-lieutenant COC	Adjudant COC	Sergent COC	Caporal COC	Soldat COC
Belgian Medical Service	Unterleutnant	Adjudant	Sergeant	Korporal	Soldat

Notes:

- Student-Officers attain the rank of Corporal, CCO after completing their military initiation phase ("MIP" ).
- Student-Officers attain the rank of Sergeant, CCO after the first winter camp when they complete the training at the 'individual' level and start their training at the 'team' and 'squad' level.
- Student-Officers take an oath after they receive their bachelor's degree and successfully complete their 'second native language' exam, thus becoming Officer-Students and attaining the rank of Lieutenant, CCO or branch equivalent.

== Enlisted ranks ==
The rank insignia of non-commissioned officers and enlisted personnel.

NATO code	OR-9		OR-8	OR-7	OR-6		OR-5	OR-4		OR-3	OR-2	OR-1
Rank group (NL)	Hoofdonderofficieren		Keuronderofficieren		Lagere onderofficieren			Keurvrijwilligers		Lagere vrijwilligers
Rank group (FR)	Sous-officiers supérieurs		Sous-officiers d'élite		Sous-officiers subalternes			Volontaires d'élite		Volontaires subalternes
Rank group (DE)	Hochrangigeunteroffiziere		Eliteunteroffiziere		Niedriger Unteroffiziere			Elitefreiwillige		Niedriger Freiwillige
Belgian Land Component
Belgian Land Component	Adjudant-majoor	Adjudant-chef	Adjudant	1ste sergeant-majoor	1ste sergeant-chef	1ste sergeant	Sergeant	1ste korporaal-chef	Korporaal-chef	Korporaal	1ste soldaat	Soldaat
Belgian Land Component	Adjudant-major	Adjudant-chef	Adjudant	1e sergent-major	1e sergent-chef	1e sergent	Sergent	1e caporal-chef	Caporal-chef	Caporal	1 soldat	Soldat
Belgian Land Component	Majoradjutant	Chefadjudant	Adjudant	1er Sergeant major	1er Sergeant chef	1er Sergeant	Sergeant	1er Korporal chef	Korporal chef	Korporal	1er soldat	Soldat
Belgian Navy
Belgian Navy	Oppermeester-chef	Oppermeester	Eerste meesterchef	Eerste meester	Meester-chef	Meester	Tweede meester	Eerste kwartiermeester-chef	Kwartiermeester-chef	Kwartiermeester	Eerste matroos	Matroos
Belgian Navy	Maître principal-chef	Maître-principal	Premier-maître chef	Premier maître	Maître-chef	Maître	Second-maître	Premier quartier-maître-chef	Quartier-maître-chef	Quartier maître	Premier matelot	Matelot
Belgian Navy	Chefhauptmeister	Hauptmeister	Erster chefmeister	Erster meister	Meister-chef	Meister	Zweiter meister	Erster oberquartiermeister	Oberquartiermeister	Quartiermeister	Erster matrose	Matrose
Belgian Air Component
Belgian Air Component	Adjudant-Majoor	Adjudant-chef	Adjudant	1ste sergeant-majoor	1ste sergeant-chef	1ste sergeant	Sergeant	1ste korporaal-chef	Korporaal-chef	Korporaal	1ste soldaat	Soldaat
Belgian Air Component	Adjudant-Major	Adjudant-chef	Adjudant	Premier sergent-major	Premier sergent-chef	Premier sergent	Sergent	Premier caporal-chef	Caporal-chef	Caporal	Premier soldat	Soldat
Belgian Air Component	Majoradjutant	Chefadjudant	Adjudant	1er Sergeant Major	1er Sergeant Chef	1er Sergeant	Sergeant	1er Korporal Chef	Korporal Chef	Korporal	1er soldat	Soldat
(Belgium) Belgian Medical Service
(Belgium) Belgian Medical Service	Adjudant-Majoor	Adjudant-chef	Adjudant	1ste sergeant-majoor	1ste sergeant-chef	1ste sergeant	Sergeant	1ste korporaal-chef	Korporaal-chef	Korporaal	1ste soldaat	Soldaat
(Belgium) Belgian Medical Service	Adjudant-Major	Adjudant-chef	Adjudant	1e sergent-major	1e sergent-chef	1e sergent	sergent	1e caporal-chef	Caporal-chef	Caporal	1e soldat	Soldat
(Belgium) Belgian Medical Service	Majoradjutant	Chefadjudant	Adjudant	1er Sergeant Major	1er Sergeant Chef	1er Sergeant	Sergeant	1er Korporal Chef	Korporal Chef	Korporal	1er soldat	Soldat
NATO code	OR-9		OR-8	OR-7	OR-6		OR-5	OR-4		OR-3	OR-2	OR-1

=== Notes ===
- CSM is an appointment at the Company level for individuals with the rank of First Sergeant or higher. Its insignia is that of the normal rank with a small crown at the top.
- RSM (Adjudant de corps/korpsadjudant) is an appointment at the Corps level for individuals with the rank of Warrant Officer or higher, this is the most senior NCO in the corps. Its insignia is that of the normal rank with a big crown at the top.
- Corps Corporal (Caporal de corps/korpskorporaal) is an appointment at the Corps level for individuals with the rank of 1st master corporal, its insignia is that of the 1st master corporal with a crown at the top.
- The rank names relating to corporal and sergeant are replaced with "brigadier" and "maréchal des logis/wachtmeester" in application to personnel of units whose traditions are related to or descend from horse units. These include the cavalry, artillery, and logistics units. Similarly, in the cavalry units, the lowest rank is named "cavalier/ruiter", they are addressed the title "Monsieur/Mijnheer", a remnant of the aristocratic origins of horse mounted units; it was sought to remove these names in March 2013, retaining only the generic rank names.
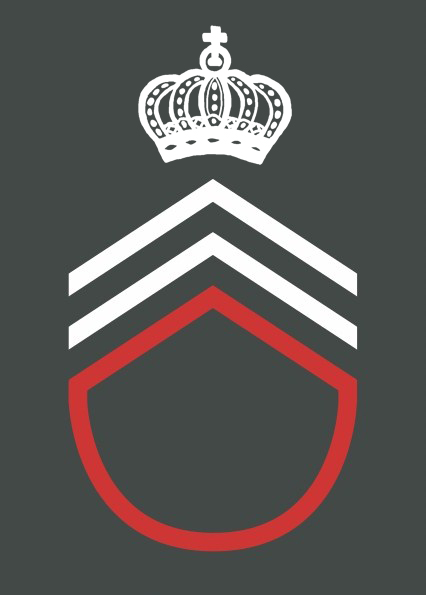
Caporal de corps / Korpskorporaal or korpsbrigadier

== Medical Service rank variations ==
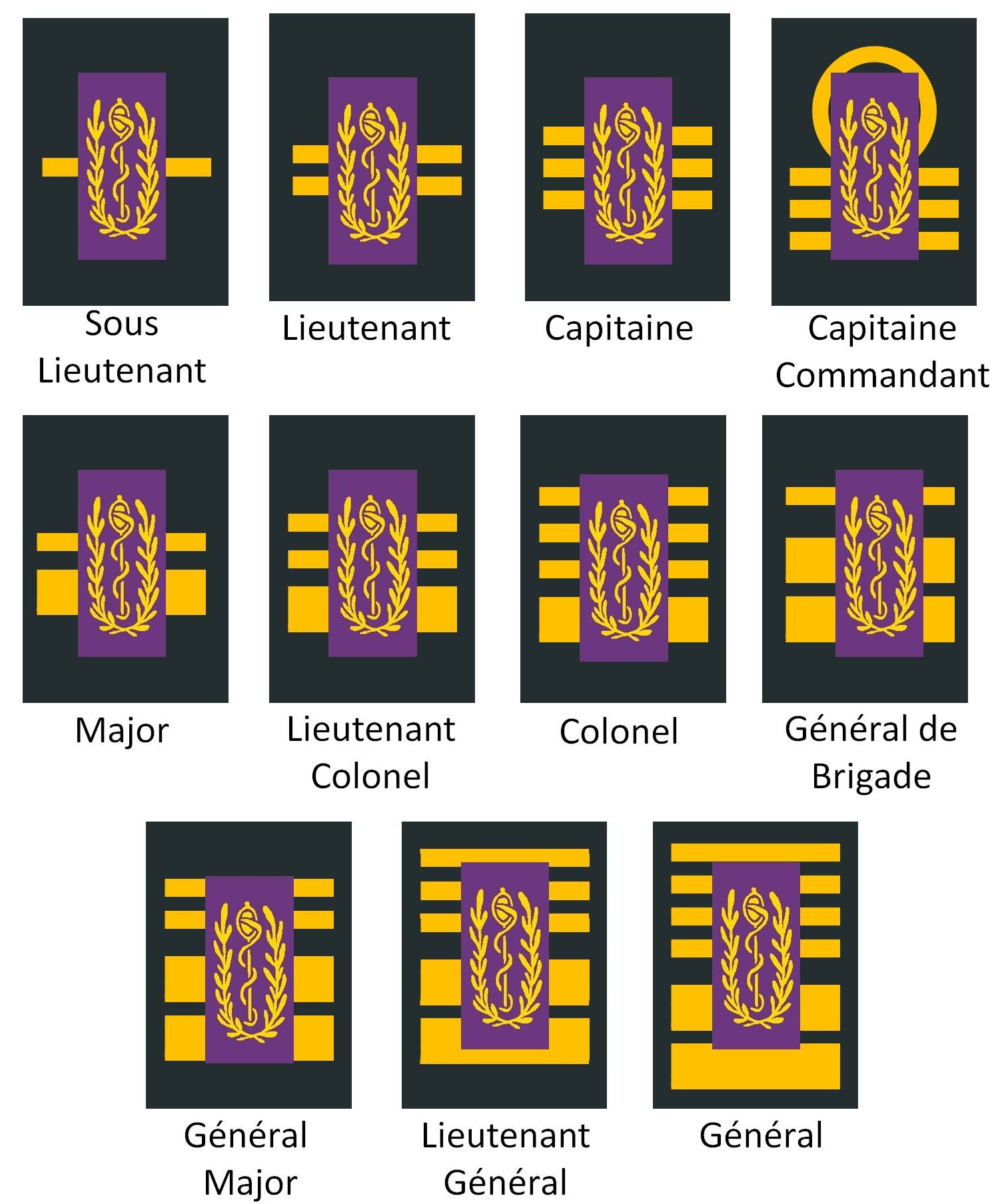
Dentist Ranks of the medical component.

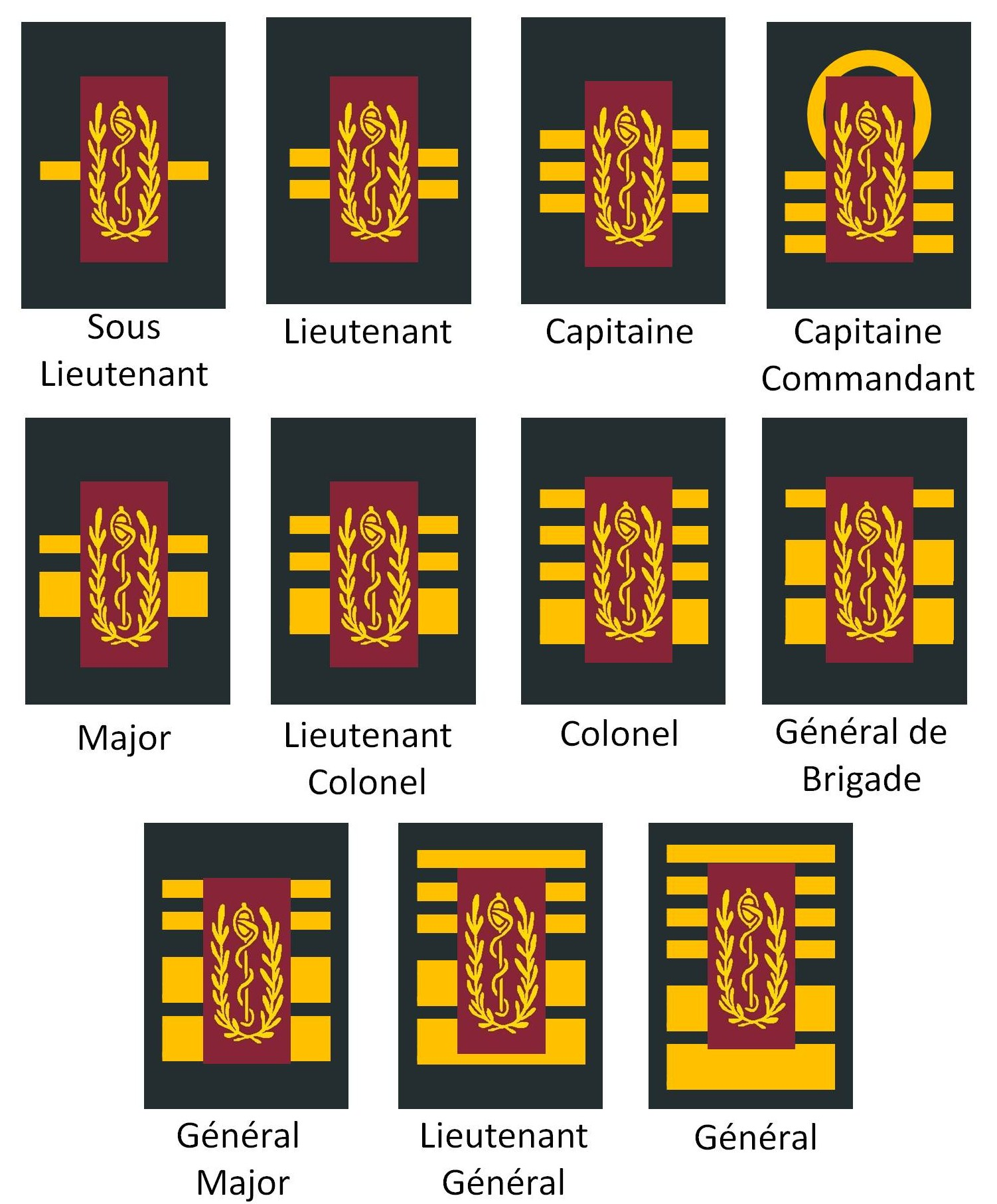
Doctor Ranks of the medical component.

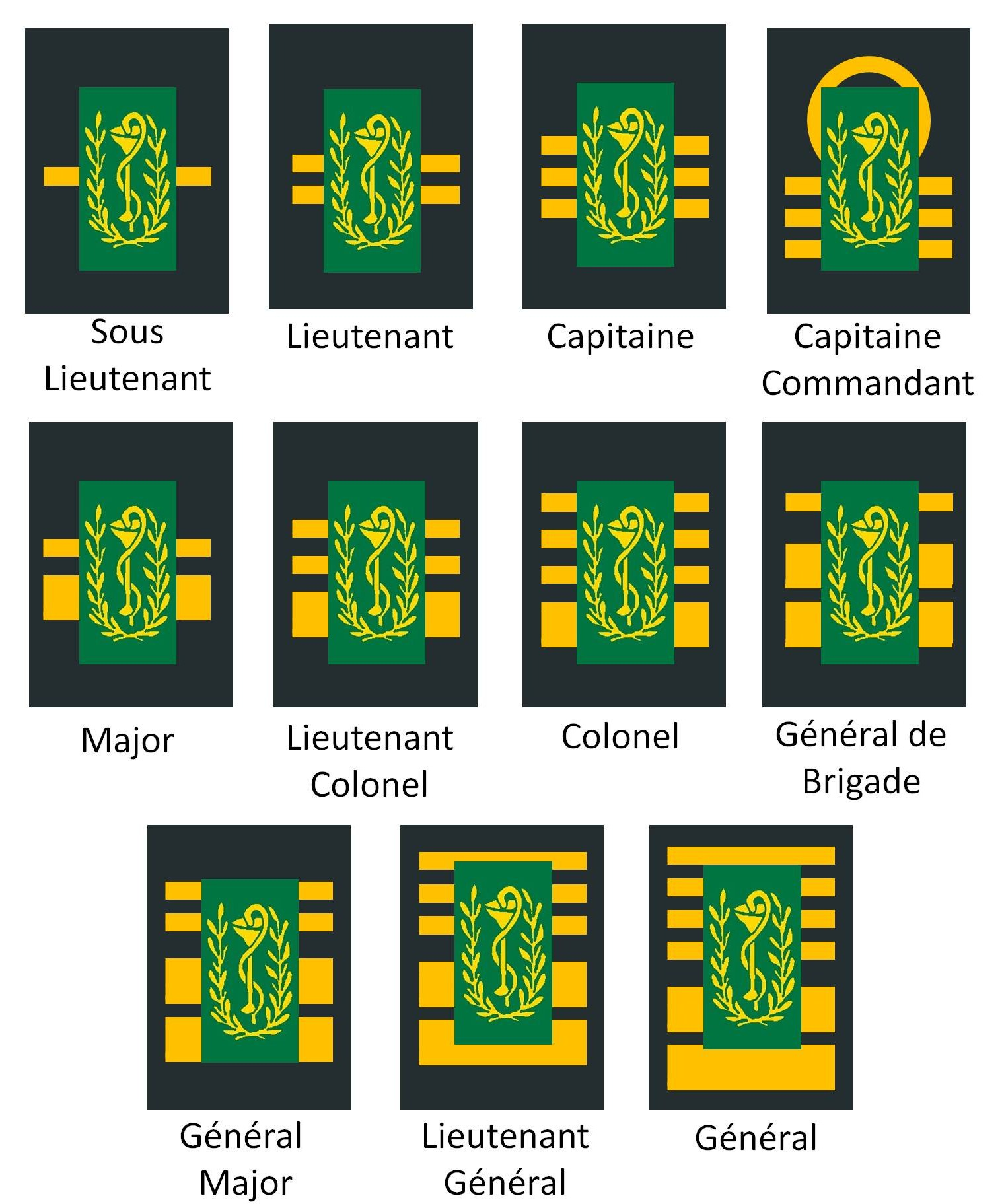
Pharmacist Ranks of the medical component.

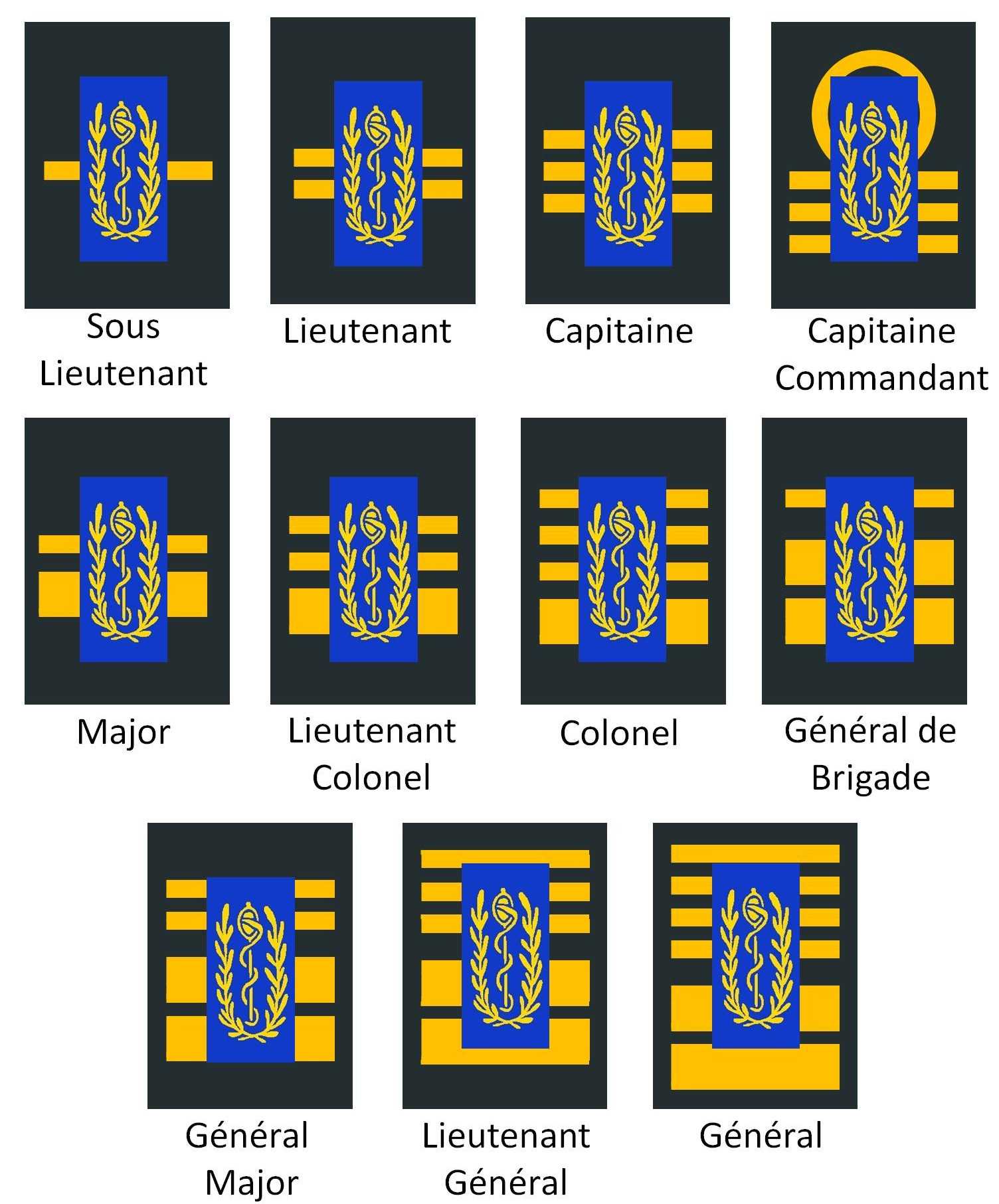
Veterinarian Ranks of the medical component.

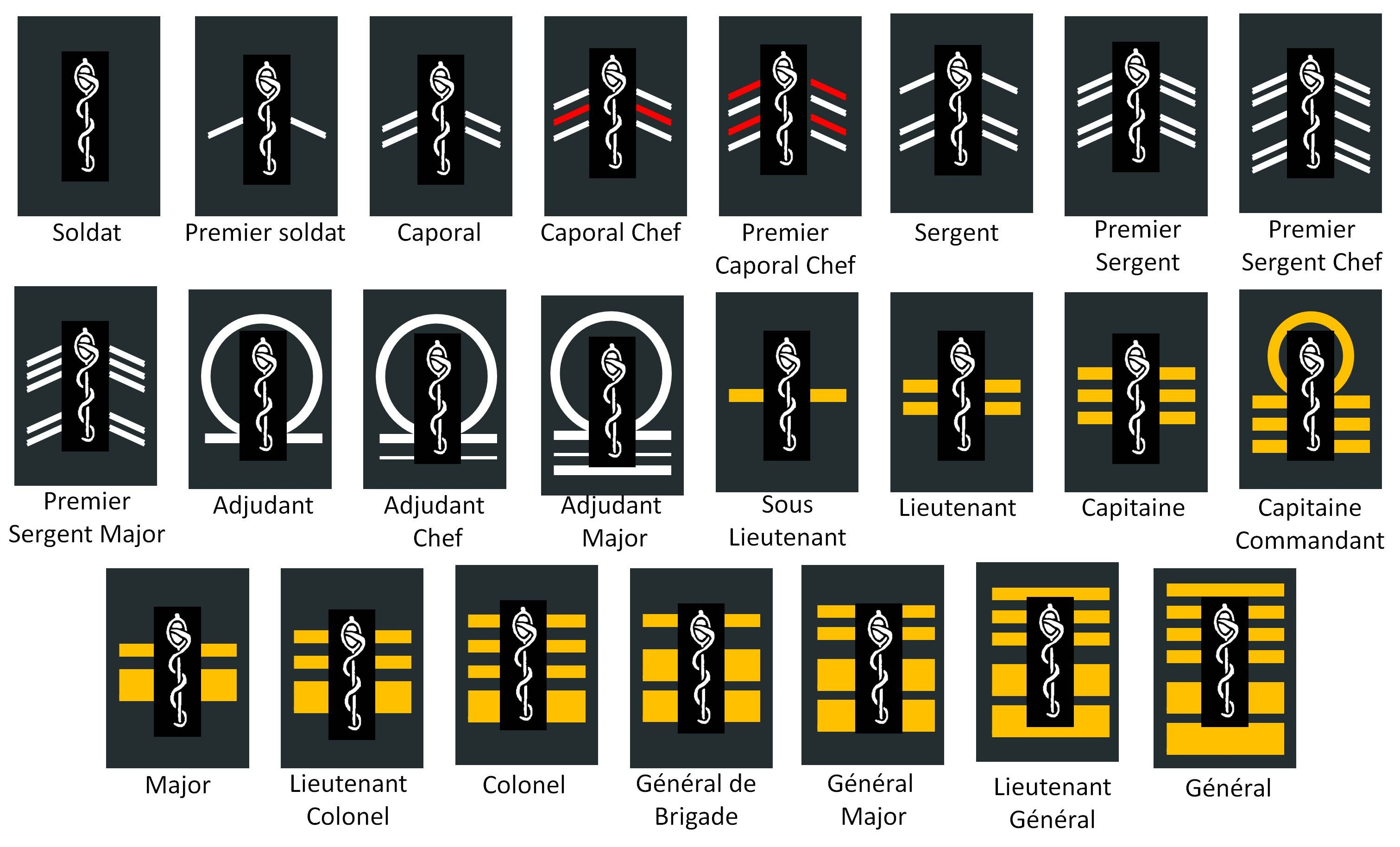
Medical Support Corps Ranks of the medical component.
