= Military Cross (Belgium) =

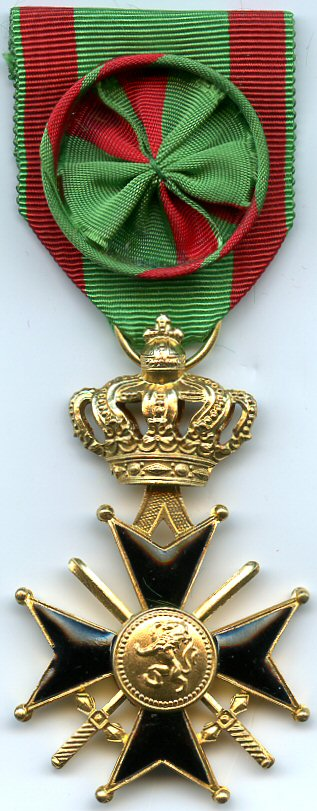
- Military Cross First Class
- Type: Military decoration
- Awarded for: Loyal and uninterrupted or meritorious service.
- Presented by: Kingdom of Belgium
- Eligibility: Commissioned Officers
- Status: Currently awarded
- Established: 11 February 1885
- Ribbon, First Class Ribbon, Second Class

Precedence
- Next (higher): Military Decoration for gallantry or exceptional devotion
- Next (lower): Military Decoration for faithful Service

The Military Cross (Dutch: Militair Kruis, French: Croix Militaire) is a military long service decoration of Belgium. It was established by Royal Decree on 11 February 1885 and is awarded to commissioned officers in the Belgian Armed Forces for loyal and uninterrupted service or to Non-Belgian military officers for distinguished service in favor of the Military of Belgium.

== Award criteria ==
=== Belgian military officers ===
The Military Cross, second class is awarded to Belgian military officers after 25 years of service.
The Military Cross, first class is awarded to Belgian military officers after 25 years of service as a commissioned officer.

In the Belgian military, years of actual service are sometimes multiplied with a certain factor when calculating the minimum due time for a long service award (to compensate for service in the air or on the battlefield). No such 'bonifications' may be applied when calculating the time served, required for the award of the Military Cross. Officers of the military reserve can also be awarded this decoration, on the condition that they are part of the trained (active) reserve forces and that their time served wasn't honored by the award of the Civic Decoration.

When serious disciplinary actions were taken against an officer, resulting in a temporary relief of duty, each month (begun) of non-activity results in a penalization of 12 months when it comes to the calculation of the service time required for this award. For example 34 days of non-activity due to disciplinary actions results in a penalization of 2 years, meaning the officer will receive the second class of the Military Cross after 28 years of service, instead of the usual 25.

This penalization is limited to 6 years per disciplinary action. This limit is reached whenever a temporary relief of duty of 7 months or more is ordered, which happens almost never.

=== Non-Belgian military officers ===
The Military Cross may be awarded to Commissioned Officers of non-Belgian armed forces for distinguished service towards the Belgian Defence. In such a case, the second class is awarded to officers below the rank of brigadier general. The first class is awarded to general officers.

== Appearance ==
The Military Cross is a black enamelled Maltese cross with a 1 mm gilt edge, the cross arms end in eight 2 mm in diameter gilt spheres. Gilt crossed swords pointing up are positioned between the arms of the cross. The obverse central medallion bears the Belgian "lion rampant", pre 1952, the reverse medallion bore the royal cypher of the reigning monarch, post 1952, the reverse is identical to the obverse.

Suspension is by means of a ribbon through a suspension ring passing through the orb of a pivot mounted crown. The green silk moiré ribbon has two 5 mm wide red stripes set 1 mm from the ribbon's edges. The Military Cross First Class differs only from the second class award in the form of a rosette on the ribbon in the same colours as the ribbon.

== Devices ==
When the first class of the medal is awarded, a rosette is attached to the ribbon.

== Notable recipients (partial list) ==
As Belgian military officers receive the award as a long service awards, their names have been omitted from this list.

- US Air Force Colonel Dean King - Military Cross Second Class
- Brigadier General Douglas MacArthur - Military Cross First Class (1918)

== See also ==
- Orders, decorations, and medals of Belgium

== Other sources ==
- Quinot H., 1950, Recueil illustré des décorations belges et congolaises, 4e Edition. (Hasselt)
- Cornet R., 1982, Recueil des dispositions légales et réglementaires régissant les ordres nationaux belges. 2e Ed. N.pl., (Brussels)
- Belgian military regulation DGHR-REG-DISPSYS-001 of 20 February 2006
