= Bignou Gallery =

Gallery in New York City, USA

Coordinates: 40.76190°N 73.97202°W

- Location: Rolls-Royce Building, 32 East 57th Street, New York

The Bignou Gallery was a New York City gallery located in Midtown Manhattan. It was a branch of the Bignou Gallery in Paris. The Bignou Gallery exhibited works by major European and American artists including Paul Gauguin, Georges Gimel, Henri Matisse, Jean Lurçat, Antoinette Schulte and Amedeo Modigliani.

== Étienne Bignou ==
Étienne Bignou (1891–1950) was a French art dealer known for his promotion of the Impressionists.

After the French art dealer Georges Petit's death, the Galerie Georges Petit was acquired by Étienne Bignou and the prominent art dealers/brothers Gaston Bernheim-Jeune and Josse Bernheim-Jeune.

== Related ==
- Georges Petit
- Jean Lurçat
- La Mousmé
