= Roland Balaÿ =

Roland Balay
- Born: 1902; Paris, France
- Died: September 16, 2004 (aged 101–102); New York, NY U.S.
- Occupation: art dealer
- Known for: director of the Knoedler Gallery

Roland Balay (May 1902, in Paris – 16 September 2004, in New York City) was a Franco-American art dealer and director of the Knoedler Gallery. He sold the family gallery to Armand Hammer in 1971.

== Biography ==
Son of Charles Balaÿ, French miniaturist painter, and Amélie Knoedler, Roland Balaÿ was the grandson of Michael Knoedler and the nephew of Roland Knoedler, respectively founder and director of the New York art gallery Knoedler. Balay joined the family firm in 1922. He was responsible, notably on behalf of Andrew Mellon, for the sales of works of art by the Soviet government 1930–1932, in association with Matthiessen galleries (Berlin) and Colnaghi (London).

Jan van Eyck - L'Annonciation, sold by the Soviet government June 1931 - Google Art Project

From the 1930s until 1940, Balay ran a gallery with Louis Carré, at 10 avenue de Messine, dealing in modern artists there and organizing exhibitions for artists Juan Gris and Paul Klee exhibitions (June–July 1938). Balay and Carré collaborated with Étienne Bignou, Valentine Dudensing, César de Hauke, Pierre Matisse and other dealers.

At the start of World War II, Balay was mobilized in the French army. He then partnered with George Keller for a time at Carstairs Gallery in New York. In 1956, after the death of Charles Henschel (Carl Henschel), Balay took over the management of the family business. He exhibited Braque, Léger, Picasso, Willem de Kooning, Henry Moore, Barnett Newman.

Balay was the last living family member to run Knoedler. In 1971, Knoedler was sold to collector Armand Hammer. Balaÿ was named honorary president of the company in 1976.

In 1975, Christie's London sold works of art belonging to him and Ruth K. Henschel.

== Family ==
From his first marriage to Marie-Thérèse Maxence, Balaÿ had a son, John Balaÿ, living in Leek, Staffordshire, and a daughter, Marianne Blondin-Walter, living in the Nantes region. Balaÿ remarried to Felicie Trayman, director of Gallery Felicie.

== Sources ==
- Wolfgang Saxon, "Roland Balay, Art Dealer in Modernsim, dies at 102", New York Times, 18 September 2004
