= Jean Lurçat =

French artist (1892–1966)

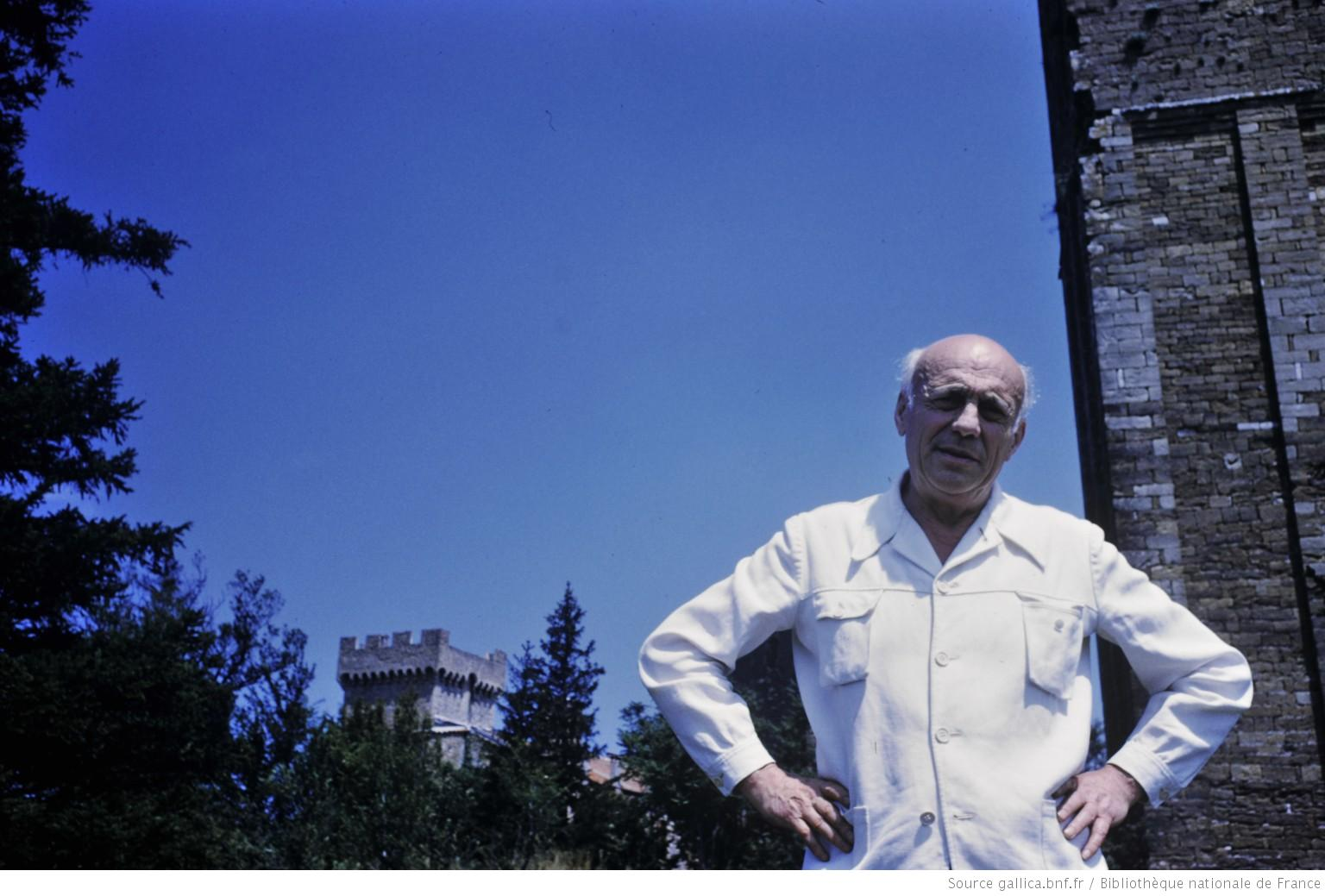
Jean Lurçat

Art auction in Amsterdam 1958, including a painting by Jean Lurçat

Jean Lurçat (French pronunciation: [ʒɑ̃ lyʁsa]; 1 July 1892 – 6 January 1966) was a French artist noted for his role in the revival of contemporary tapestry. He was also a painter and ceramist.

== Biography ==
He was born in Bruyères, Vosges, the son of Lucien Jean Baptiste Lurçat and Marie Emilie Marguerite L'Hote. He was the brother of André Lurçat, who became an architect. After his secondary education at Épinal, he enrolled at La Faculté des sciences de Nancy and studied medicine. He went to Switzerland and Germany (Munich) and in leaving his educational path, he went to the workshop of Victor Prouvé, the head of the École de Nancy.

== Painting and the War ==
In 1912, Jean Lurçat took residence in Paris with his brother André. He enrolled at the Académie Colarossi, then at the workshop of the engraver, Bernard Naudin. He met painters such as Matisse, Cézanne, Renoir; his friends included Rainer Maria Rilke, Antoine Bourdelle, and Elie Faure. Lurçat and three associates founded the Feuilles de Mai (The leaves of May), a journal of art in which these celebrities participated. He then became an apprentice of the painter Jean-Paul Lafitte with whom he had an exhibition at La faculté des sciences de Marseille. His first journey to Italy was interrupted in August by the declaration of war. Back in France, Lurçat joined the infantry, but was evacuated on 15 November after falling ill. During his recovery to health, in 1915, he practised painting and lithography. In July 1916, he returned to the front, but was evacuated once again due to injury. He never returned to the front. In September, his art was put on exhibition in Zürich.

== Discovery of tapestry ==
In 1917, Jean Lurçat made his first tapestries: Filles Vertes (Green Girls) and Soirée dans Grenade (Evening in Grenada). At the end of the war in 1918, he returned to Switzerland where he had a holiday in Ticino (Swiss Italy), with Rilke, Busoni, Hermann Hesse and Jeanne Bucher. His second exhibition took place in Zürich in the same year. In 1920, he travelled extensively: Berlin, Munich, Rome, Naples. Then he took up residence in Paris with Marthe Hennebert. It was she who wove two tapestries: Pêcheur (Fisherman) and Piscine (Swimming pool). He unveiled in the same year, at Le Salon des Indépendants, two tapestries and four paintings. He met the art merchant Étienne Bignou.

In 1921, Jean Lurçat met Louis Marcoussis, he discovered Picasso and Max Jacob, and created decoration and costumes for Le spectacle de la Compagnie Pitoeff: "He who receives slaps", and then spent the autumn near the Baltic sea. The following year, he created his fifth tapestry, Le Cirque (the circus), for Mme. Cuttoli. His first personal exhibition took place in Paris in April and September. He made a large decoration on a wall (no longer visible today) at the Castle of Villeflix. Then he went to Berlin, where he met Ferruccio Busoni.

During the next two years Lurçat resumed travelling. In 1923 he went to Spain; in 1924 he went to North Africa, the Sahara, Greece and Asia Minor. Upon his return, he signed a contract without exclusivity with his friend, Étienne Bignou. His brother André built his new house, Villa Seurat, in Paris. He devoted a portion of the year 1924 to the making of his sixth tapestry, Les arbres (The trees). On 15 December, Lurçat married Marthe Hennebert and traveled in 1925 to Scotland, then Spain and northern Africa. Upon his return, he took up residence at La Villa Seurat. He participated in several expositions with Raoul Dufy, Marcoussis, Laglenne and others. He revealed, at the home of Jeanne Bucher, elements of decoration (carpets and paintings) of Le Vertige, a film by Marcel l'Herbier. In 1926, he exhibited in Paris and Brussels, and participated in collective exhibitions in Vienna, Paris, and Anvers. His fame began due to several articles devoted to him.

== Years of glory ==
With the company of Marthe, he departed in 1927 for the Orient and spent the summer in Greece and Turkey. He decorated the lounge of the family of David David-Weill. There are four tapestries in developing and implementing L'Orage (The storm), for George Salles (Musée National d'Art Moderne, National Museum of Modern Art). He returned to Greece and Italy (Rome) in 1928 before embarking in October for the United States of America, for his first exhibition in New York. He spent 1929 in Marco. In 1930 he had exhibitions in Paris, London, New York, and Chicago; he created nine drypoint illustrations for Les Limbes (The limbo) by Charles-Albert Cingria; and he made another visit to America. In that same year he divorced Marthe Hennebert. In 1931 he married Rosane Timotheef and they took up residence in Vevey (Switzerland). He wrote several articles about painting, and reduced his production of pictures.

In December, 1932, Lurçat participated in the exhibition Sélections with Matisse, Picasso, Braque, Derain and Raoul Dufy; the event was organised in New York by the Valentine Gallery. Being aligned with the far left, from then on he often mixed his political opinions with his art. In 1933, he was living in New York. He created the decoration and the costumes for the Jardin Public (Public Garden), a ballet by Leonid Massine. 1933 also saw his first tapestry sewn at Aubusson, following the new and revolutionary technique that he developed.

== Lurçat and the revival of French tapestry ==
In order to fully appreciate and understand the works of Jean Lurçat, one must view them in the context of the history of tapestry, in particular, the downfall of its existence during the rise of the Renaissance. It was during this time that tapestry was somewhat re-invented, where by traditional techniques were misplaced in the likening of tapestry to paintings by artists of the likes of Raphael. Jean Lurçat is largely responsible for its revival in the 20th century when he redefined the importance of designing tapestry in a way that embraced the integrity of authentic tapestry from the Middle Ages, inspiring artists like Picasso to acquire the skills to design for tapestry.

It was in the 15th century that tapestry, in its authentic form, was first recorded as being practiced. By this time the technique had been mastered which gives us no reference as to when it was first put into practice. What we do know is that during the rise of the Renaissance in the early sixteenth century, the art of tapestry was alienated by a demand for tapestry to imitate painting as closely as possible. This allowed for traditional techniques, like hachure and hatching, to fall by the wayside allowing the art of tapestry to experience a kind of identity crisis. Techniques like shape-building dominated this new presence, creating an aesthetic dissimilar to that of traditional tapestry in that it achieved shading and implied dimension by building shapes as opposed to blending shapes and colour with the above mentioned techniques. This, in essence, created a new art form; a derivative of tapestry, effectively superseding it.

Western European tapestry history spans the foundation of the Gobelins manufactory 1662 to the beginning of the third republic of France in 1871. It is in this time period where the subservience to painting is observed as being the dominant characteristic of tapestry. The commission by Pope Leo X in the early sixteenth century of The Acts of the Apostles by Raphael, to be woven in the Brussels workshops is thought be the turning point whereby tapestry was to, from that point on, be fashioned after designs supplied by painters.

The relationship of painting to tapestry in fact began in 1476 where the first counts of tapestry weaving were in Belgium, and painters had ostracized weavers for creating their own cartoons. Thus indicating that tapestries were originally made in the likeness of paintings, and is where traditional techniques were formed. Furthermore, in the 1500s, painters (with paint) and later designated specialized glazers (with only ink, wild-grain colour or chalk) were commissioned to touch up and create defined lines around the shapes on the surface of woven tapestry. The need for this integration of painting on tapestry has been observed as being the result of poor tapestry cartoons.

Jean Lurçat himself began as a painter and tapestry weaver in 1915. He became intrigued by tapestry weaving when he was learned of its history. Lurçat was especially influenced by Apocalypse of Angiers (14C) which he viewed in 1937. He came away from this experience more sure that emotional content and reduction of means, or "scale of pre-arranged colour" were of ultimate importance to tapestry design. Lurçat was already practicing these values and was pleased to see them validated by such an illustrious and historically powerful piece. Consequently, his convictions about how tapestry should be designed, regarded and used became stronger.

The opening statement of Lurcat's Designing Tapestry, distinguishes tapestry and easel paintings by their location: tapestries custom made for a specific, large wall. Lurçat later refers to tapestry as a medium whose most authentic form is: 1) embedded with content; 2) is invariably large scale (15 meters X 15 meters), and; 3) is designed and thought of as being forever connected to architecture. The artist asserts: "I want to remind you that Tapestry knew its proudest moments in a time when a style of extremely grandiose architecture reigned supreme".

There are many things about tapestry that Lurçat is sure of, e.g. the emphasis of content in relation to economy; the importance for tapestry to continue to thrive as a partner to architecture. The most recurring theme in his book, Designing Tapestry, is that of the strict design guidelines of which should be followed in order for the weaver, who is presumably not the designer, to have no artistic freedom so as for the designer to be able to design a tapestry cartoon and achieve exactly what they had envisioned as a result. In essence, Lurçat recommends a non-interpretive code in which the weaver would have no question as to what the designer requires of them. Additionally, Lurçat makes it very clear that the idea of fashioning a tapestry after a painting, especially one that had originally been painted with no intention of becoming a tapestry, was to Lurçat misrepresentative and disrespectful to the art form.

== Expositions in the USSR ==
In 1934, Lurçat returned to New York where he participated in the creation of new decoration and costumes for a choreography of Balanchine; which he unveiled in Chicago and Philadelphia. Then he returned to Paris and Vevey for the summer. At summer's end, he departed for Moscow, where he had an exhibition at the Musée Occidental (Western Museum), then at the museum of Kiev. In 1935, he painted the Dynamiteros in Spain; with inspiration from the revolution and the War of Spain. In Paris, he participated in the activities of the Association of the revolutionary authors and artists. Then, he followed, with Malraux and Aragon, the Journées d'Amité pour l'Union Soviétique (The Journeys of Friendship for the Soviet Union). In 1936, he exhibited in London and released his first tapestry, made at La Manufacture des Gobelins (The Gobelins Tapestry Manufactory, Paris), Les Illusions d'Icare (The Illusions of Icare). In 1937, he met François Tabard.

== Vision of the apocalypse ==
In 1936, Jean Lurçat was inspired when he saw the tapestry L'Apocalypse (The Apocalypse), which was woven in the 14th century. In 1938, Moisson was sewn. In 1939, he exhibited in New York and in Paris. In September, he took up residence in Aubusson with Gromaire and Dubreuil in order to renovate the art of tapestry, which at the time had fallen to a low point. His innovative technique used a simplified palette and robust weaving at broad point. During this period he abandoned oil painting in favour of poster paints. The Musée National d'Art Moderne (National Museum of Modern Art) acquired Jardin des Coqs (Garden of Roosters) and L'Homme aux Coqs (The Man of the Roosters), of which the cardboard would be destroyed by the SS in 1944 in Lanzac. In 1940, he collaborated with André Derain and Raoul Dufy.

== Resistance ==
In June 1944, he associated himself with the fighters of the communist resistance, namely, Tristan Tzara, André Chamson, René Huyghe, Jean Cassou, and Jean Agamemnon. He was put on the Comité de Libération (Committee of Liberation). He also met Simone Selves, who would later become his wife. His adoptive son, Victor, was captured while on an intelligence mission in France and was put to death. Lurçat would not learn of his disappearance until the following year.

== Legacy ==
Lurçat died on 6 January 1966 in Saint-Paul de Vence. During the 1980s, his widow Simone established the Musée Jean Lurçat de Saint-Laurent les Tours and the Musée Jean Lurçat et de la Tapisserie contemporaine, and bequeathed many of his works to posterity.

== In popular culture ==
Terror Twilight (1999), the final album by American indie rock band Pavement features a part of Lurçat's 1957 tapestry La Grande Menace ("The Great Threat") as the cover art.
