= Simone Lurçat =

Simone Andrée Marie-Louise Lurçat (11 August 1915 – 23 March 2009), née Selves, was a member of the French Resistance during the Second World War and the wife of the artist Jean Lurçat.

She was born at Castelnau-Montratier into a family of teachers (though her father was a chemist), and herself became a teacher in the village of Calvignac. In 1937 she began her formal tertiary education in Toulouse, but was forced to interrupt them by the outbreak of war. When German tanks moved into the city's Place du Capitole on 11 November 1942, she decided to join the Resistance, and it was through this that she met her future husband, who was more than twenty years her senior.

Her role was that of a regional liaison officer and she was responsible for the safety of the families of those who had been shot or imprisoned. Working under Agnés Bidault at COSOR (Comité des Œuvres Sociales de la Résistance), she began to organise a political entity that would later become the Conseil départemental du Lot.

When the war ended, Simone Selves was involved in the repatriation of prisoners and travelled to Germany to help with this work. On her return, she was assigned first to the Ministry of National Education and later to the Ministry of Health, with particular responsibility for young blind people. She was reunited with Lurçat, and they were married on 11 August 1956.

In 1960, she decided to devote herself to promoting the work of her artist husband, who died in 1966. During the 1980s, she was responsible for the establishment of the Musée Jean Lurçat de Saint-Laurent les Tours and the Musée Jean Lurçat et de la Tapisserie contemporaine. She ensured that Le Chant du Monde, a tapestry series completed by Lurçat shortly before his death, was put on display at the Salle des Malades of the Hôpital Saint Jean from 1968 onwards. When several of Lurçat's tapestries were damaged by a fire, his widow made the final decision as to which of them should be destroyed and recreated and which were capable of conservation.

She died in Paris, aged 93. The Fondation Jean et Simone Lurçat was established in 2010 as a result of her bequest.
