= King Albert Medal =

Belgian medal

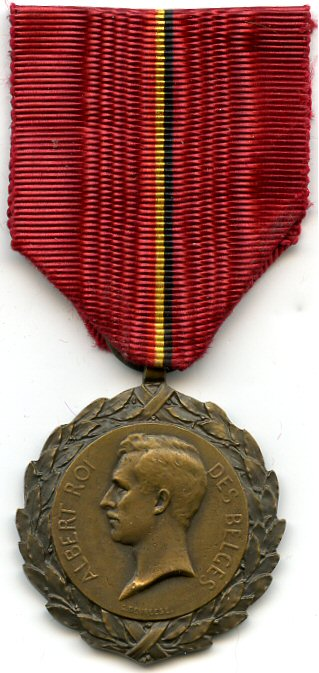
- King Albert Medal (obverse)
- Type: War medal
- Awarded for: Humanitarian assistance to Belgians during World War 1
- Presented by: Kingdom of Belgium
- Eligibility: Belgian citizens and foreign nationals
- Status: No longer awarded
- Established: 7 April 1919
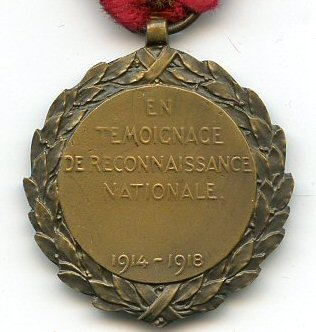
- Reverse of the medal

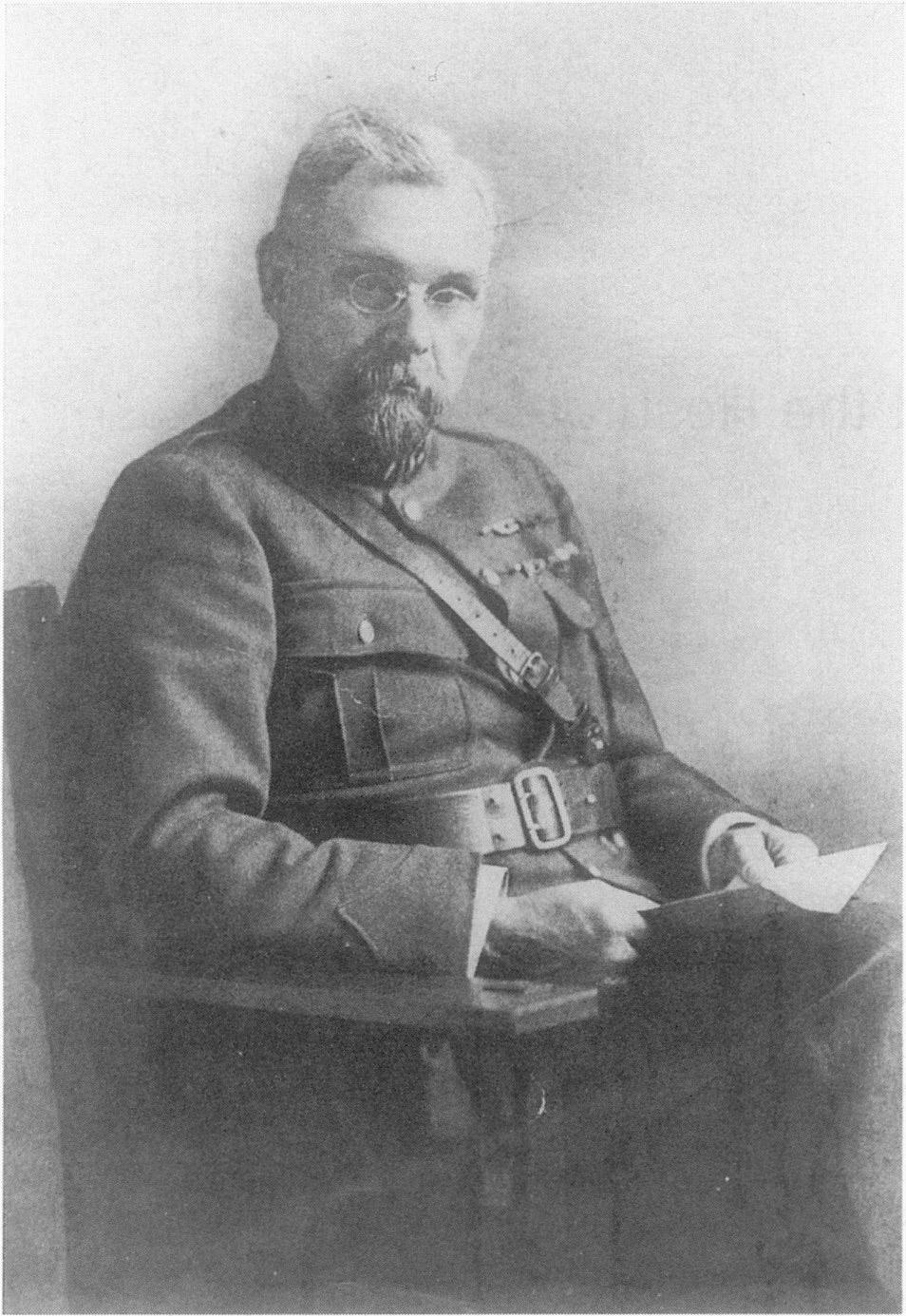
Major General Doctor Antoine Depage, a recipient of the King Albert medal

The King Albert Medal (Dutch: Koning Albert Medaille, French: Médaille du Roi Albert) was a Belgian medal established by royal decree on 7 April 1919 and awarded to both Belgians and foreigners who were exceptionally meritorious in promoting, organising or administering humanitarian and charitable work that assisted Belgians in need during the First World War.

== Description ==
The King Albert Medal is a 35mm in diameter circular bronze medal. Its obverse bears a 25mm in diameter central medallion bearing the left profile of King Albert I with the inscription in French or in Dutch "ALBERT KING OF THE BELGIANS" (French: "ALBERT ROI DES BELGES", Dutch: "ALBERT KONING DER BELGEN") surrounded by a 5mm wide laurel wreath along the entire medal circumference. On the reverse of the central medallion, the relief inscription on four lines in French or in Dutch "IN TESTIMONY OF NATIONAL RECOGNITION" (French: "EN TEMOIGNAGE DE RECONNAISSANCE NATIONALE", Dutch: "ALS BLIJK VAN'S LANDS ERKENTELIJKHEID") with the years "1914-1918" at the bottom.

The medal is suspended by a ring through a suspension loop from a 38mm wide dark red silk moiré ribbon bearing a single 3mm wide longitudinal central stripe in the national colours of Belgium (1mm red, 1mm yellow and 1mm black). The ribbon bore two such stripes if the recipients distinguished themselves in the covert resupply of occupied Belgium.

== Notable recipients (partial list) ==
The individuals listed below were awarded the King Albert Medal:

- Major General Doctor Antoine Depage
- Major General Baron Edouard Empain
- Cavalry Major General Baron Louis de Moor
- Lieutenant General Doctor Paul Derache
- Louis Dewis
- Lieutenant General Doctor Edmond François Durré
- Count Gaston Errembault de Dudzeele
- Count Edmond Carton de Wiart
- Edmond Rubbens
- Léonce du Castillon
- René Gérard
- Edmond Ronse
- Vicount Paul van Iseghem
- Count Pierre de Liedekerke
- Percy H Webb
- Fernando De Soignie

== See also ==
- Orders, decorations, and medals of Belgium

== Other sources ==
- Quinot H., 1950, Recueil illustré des décorations belges et congolaises, 4e Edition. (Hasselt)
- Cornet R., 1982, Recueil des dispositions légales et réglementaires régissant les ordres nationaux belges. 2e Ed. N.pl., (Brussels)
- Borné A.C., 1985, Distinctions honorifiques de la Belgique, 1830-1985 (Brussels)
