= Louis Dewis =

Belgian Post-Impressionist painter

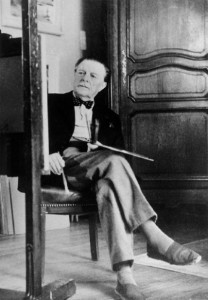
- Born: Isidore Louis DeWachter; 1 November 1872; Leuze, Belgium
- Died: 5 December 1946 (aged 74); Biarritz, France
- Known for: Painting
- Notable work: L’innondation, 1920; Port of Villefranche, 1930
- Awards: Légion d'honneur Chevalier (Knight) 1932 (France) Grande Médaille de la Reconnaissance française (France) Officier d'Académie; Silver Palms 1912 (France) Officier de l'Instruction Publique; Golden Palms 1922 (France) Lauréat du Salon des Artistes Français (France) Médaille de la Société d'Instruction et d'Education Populaire (France) Order of Leopold II; Knight (Belgium) King Albert Medal (Belgium) Order of Glory; San'f al-Talet (Officer) (Tunisia)
- Patrons: Georges Petit

Louis Dewis (1872–1946) was the pseudonym of Belgian Post-Impressionist painter Louis DeWachter, who was also an innovative and highly successful businessman. He helped organize and managed the first department store chain.

== Early life ==
He was born Isidore Louis DeWachter in Leuze, Belgium, the eldest son among the seven children of Isidore Louis DeWachter and Eloise Desmaret DeWachter. The father went by Isidore, while the future Dewis was called Louis. The name "DeWachter" has Flemish roots, however Louis DeWachter always considered himself a Walloon.

Isidore and his two brothers (Benjamin and Modeste) originated the idea of the chain department store when they formed Maisons Dewachter (Houses of Dewachter) in 1868, which they formally incorporated as the Belgian firm Dewachter frères (Dewachter Brothers) on 1 January 1875. For business purposes, they had decided not to use the capital "W" in the family name and because the chain became so famous, published references to the family would also be spelled "Dewachter". By the time of Dewis's death, the family had adopted the spelling "Dewachter" as well.

Maisons Dewachter introduced the idea of ready-made – or ready-to-fit – clothing for men and children, and specialty clothing such as riding apparel and beachwear. Isidore owned 51% of the company, while his brothers split the remaining 49%. They started with four locations: the Walloon city of Leuze (where Louis was born), La Louvière and two at Mons. Under Isidore's (and later Louis') leadership, Maisons Dewachter would become one of the most recognized names in Belgium and France.

Soon after the company was formed, Isidore and his family moved to Liège to open another branch. It was in that industrial city that Louis established a lifelong friendship with Richard Heintz (fr:Richard Heintz) (1871–1929), who also became an internationally known landscape artist. Heintz is considered the outstanding representative of the Liège school of landscape painting, a movement that greatly influenced Dewis's early work.

When Louis was 14, the family moved to Bordeaux, France, where Isidore established what would be the chain's flagship store. Louis, who had begun his studies at the Athénée Royal Liège, continued lycée (high school) at Bordeaux. For the rest of his life, he would remain an étranger – a Belgian citizen living in France.

== Family ==
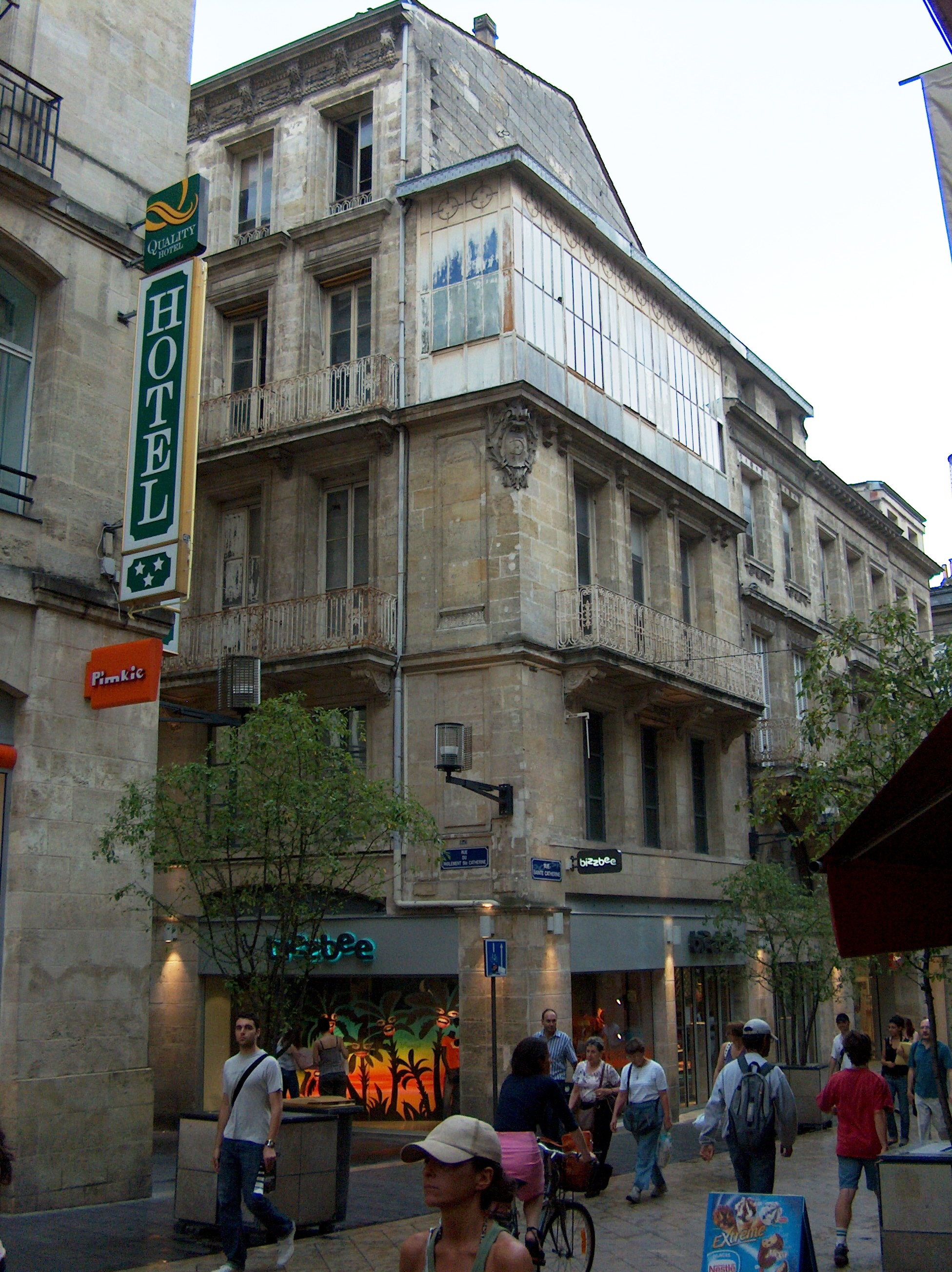
Maison Dewachter and family residence (above), 36 Rue de St-Cathérine, Bordeaux (2006 photo)

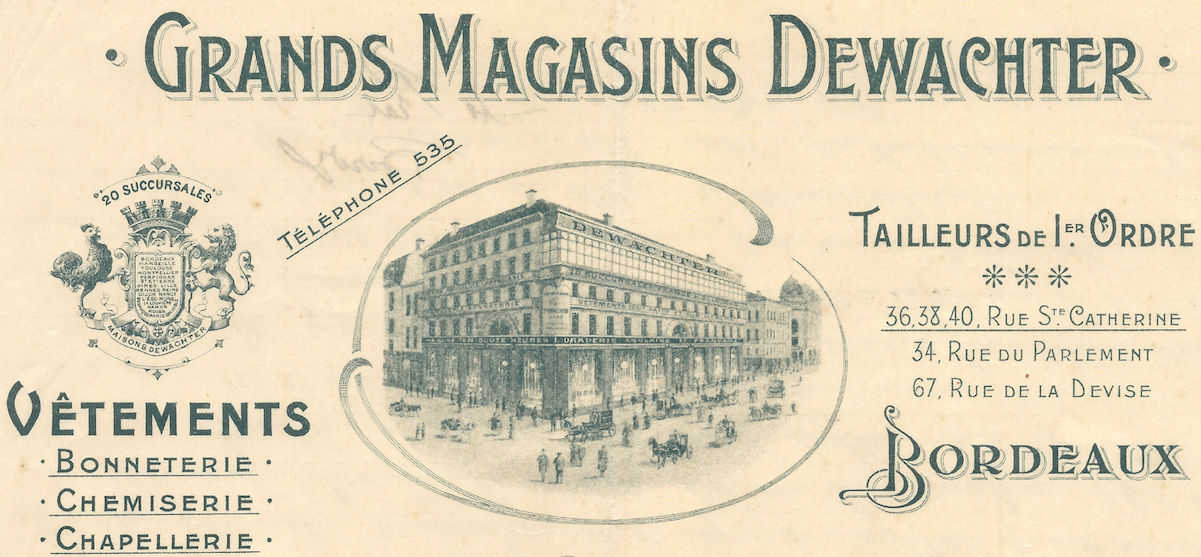
Maison Dewachter Bordeaux's appearance as depicted on its 1904 letterhead

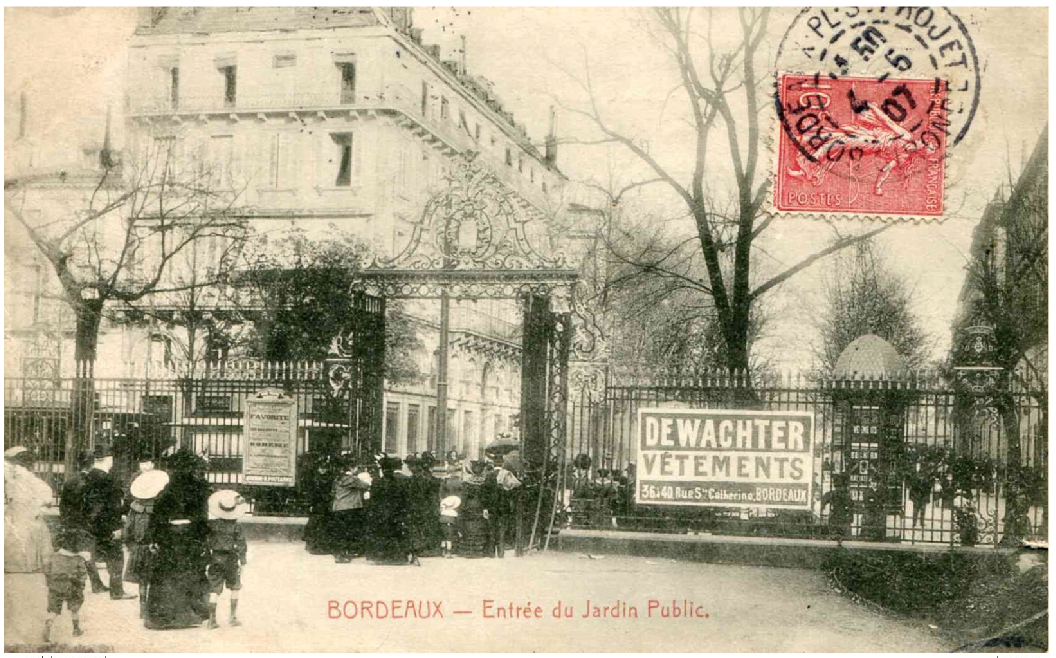
Maison Dewachter promotional post card showing a Dewachter sign at the entrance of Bordeaux's Public Garden (1907)

Louis DeWachter married Bordeaux socialite Elisabeth Marie Florigni (12 August 1873 - 25 August 1952) on 16 July 1896. Elisabeth was the daughter of Joseph-Jules Florigni (1842 - 14 April 1919) and Rose Lesfargues Florigni (1843 - 11 September 1917).

There was a feeling among some members of the Florigni family, which traced its roots back to the court of Catherine de' Medici, that "Babeth" had "married down."

Jules Florigni administered the Bordeaux regional newspapers the Girond and La Petite Gironde and was Chevalier de la Légion d’Honneur (Knight of the French Legion of Honor).

Elisabeth's brother, Robert (1881–1945), authored some 30 popular novels, several stage plays and at least ten screen plays. He was also a Paris-based journalist on the staff of La Petite Gironde and, like his father, Robert Florigni was named Chevalier de la Légion d’Honneur.

In 1919, Dewis's older daughter, Yvonne Elisabeth Marie, (23 Sep 1897, Toulouse, France - 19 Feb 1966, Saint Petersburg, Florida, USA) a student at the University of Bordeaux where she met and, after a whirlwind courtship, married Bradbury Robinson (1884–1949), a graduate student from America. He was a widowed army officer (a combat veteran of the Great War) and a medical doctor who, after being discharged in the United States, had returned to France to continue his studies. The couple would travel around Western Europe as Dr. Robinson oversaw immigrant screening for the U.S. Public Health Service. In 1906, Robinson had gained fame in the United States for having thrown the first forward pass in an American football game. The couple moved to the United States in 1926. They had seven children together, and Yvonne also gained a stepson from her husband's first marriage (his first wife having died in 1914).

In her memoirs, Yvonne remembers that in the early years of Dewis's career, her mother regarded her father's painting with benign indifference. She writes that Elisabeth DeWachter was pleased with her husband's choice of "hobbies" in one sense, telling her friends, "at least it's not noisy."

As the years passed, Elisabeth took more interest. It was she who maintained Dewis's scrapbook of critical reviews for three decades.

His younger daughter and only other child, Andrée Marguerite Elisabeth (24 September 1903 in Rouen, France - 11 May 2002 in Paris), married businessman Charles Jérôme Ottoz (1903–1993) in 1925, who proved to be less than supportive of his talented father-in-law.

Ottoz had his own connections to the art world. He was the namesake of his grandfather Jérôme (1819–1885), the well-known Paris color merchant and art collector (especially of Corots) who loved to show his paintings to visitors at his shop on the rue Pigalle. Ottoz's grandfather was also the subject of the famous portrait painted in 1876 by Edgar Degas.

A serious student of art, Andrée was passionate in her admiration of her father's work. As Yvonne lived in the States during the last 20 years of Dewis's life, Andrée was the artist's only child to witness the most important years of his career. She was so emotionally involved in his painting that one day Dewis wondered aloud whether his daughter would have loved him as much, "if I'd been a grocer." Years later, Andrée tearfully recalled assuring her father that she would.

== Life as an artist delayed, success in business immediate ==
Young Louis had displayed an interest (and astonishing talent) in art at the age of 8 – but Isidore was enraged at the thought that his offspring might waste his time with something as useless as painting. In a vain attempt to break his young son of his "bad habit," he would, on occasion, throw away or burn the boy’s canvases, paints and brushes.

The youngster's love of art could not be deterred. It could, however, be overwhelmed by business and family responsibilities. As the eldest son, Louis was expected to take over the family business. This was a duty that his father would not allow him to shirk and which made Louis' dream of life as an artist impossible.

Father and son, however, apparently made a good team. They doubled the number of cities and towns served by Maison Dewachter from 10 to 20 in Louis' first dozen years with the firm. Some cities had multiple stores, such as Bordeaux, which had three. For more than a decade, it was Louis' job to move from one place to another in France to open new stores, which would then be run by one cousin or another.

By 1908, Louis was back in Bordeaux managing the flagship Grand Magasin (Department Store). He assumed ultimate responsibility for 15 of the Maisons Dewachter.

He found a creative outlet as an active and innovative marketer, and ran ads in newspapers; distributed illustrated catalogues; placed advertising on billboards and on trolleys; and published several series of promotional postal cards. Some of the cards featured famous art, others humorous cartoons and another series bore images of Maison Dewachter signage that had been temporarily erected at well known locations.

In addition to the management of an international chain of department stores, Louis was forced to assume an additional burden when a brother lost a small fortune gambling. With his father too infirm to deal with the situation, it once again fell to the oldest son to do his duty and settle the enormous debt. Louis had no choice but to borrow the sum from a very rich relation, something that humiliated him to his core. So, as a matter of honor, he insisted on repaying the loan with 100% interest – over the protests of the lender and everyone else in the family. As a result, the task took Louis several years. These responsibilities and World War I combined to condemn him to what was a frustrating life as a merchant, however successful, until after his father's death and the conclusion of the war.

=== Sunday painter ===
Throughout his business career, Louis DeWachter maintained an atelier in his home and was essentially a Sunday painter.

His few surviving early works (dating from 1885 into the early 1900s) were unsigned because his father refused to allow him to sully the family name by associating it with such a frivolous undertaking. In about 1916, Dewachter signed his first work with the pseudonym "Louis Dewis" (pronounced Lew-WEE Dew-WEES). His nom d'artiste "Dewis" is composed of the first three letters of his last name – followed by the first two letters of his first name – Isidore.

As a wealthy merchant, his interest in art was not financially motivated. His daughter Yvonne wrote that, while living in Bordeaux, he turned down at least one offer of sponsorship – an offer conditioned on him giving up "the tailoring business."

Father told him [the hopeful sponsor] to mind his own business, that he would take care of his family the way he wanted to and nobody was going to tell him what to do. Well, maybe he felt free the rest of his life, but real artistic success was never his. No doubt he was a great artist and had recognition in a certain arty circle, but ... he could have been as famous as Utrillo or Picasso ... (l)ike everything else, it is a matter of publicity.

And, Yvonne recalled that the young Dewis made "real artistic success" even more difficult to achieve.

Another handicap was that he hated to part with any of his paintings. I remember as a girl, when anyone came to his studio and wanted to buy something, he always found some kind of excuse for not selling.

== First exhibitions ==
Dewis began to focus on his art about 1916, which motivated him to adopt the pseudonym "Dewis." He was 43 years old.

In the summer of that year, Dewis staged what was probably his first exhibition at the Imberti Galleries in Bordeaux, news of which reached across the trenches that divided France in the midst of World War I – to his native Belgium. Le Vingtième Siècle (The Twentieth Century) was clandestinely publishing a one-page edition in German-occupied Brussels. The paper somehow obtained a review of Dewis's exhibition for its 22 July 1916, issue. It was placed at the top of the page and titled: "Our artists in France." It expressed sentiments that critics would echo for the next thirty years:

[S]ome "singing" landscapes attract the eye. The brush, soaked in the matutinal coolness or in the blue mist of the windrow, has more freedom and lightness. It emerges from the cliché. This is how he must paint, with no other care than to allow his soul to vibrate like a bird, in the light.

The skies are like ours, changing, full of music ... The subtle movement of the waters seduces the artist; and it renders their undulating countenances a thousand reflections.

In 1917, as part of Dewis's considerable efforts to aid his Belgian countrymen (for which he was honored by both Belgium and France), he helped organize Le Salon franco-belge in the Bordeaux Public Garden. It was a charity event for the benefit of Belgian war refugees sponsored by the Belgian Benevolent Society of the South West and the Girondin Artists. This event was the first of a series of exhibitions in which the art of Louis Dewis would draw serious attention from some prominent art critics of the era.

Louis Dewis embodies the Flemish spirit, in love with colorings that are warm and harmonious. He treats tenderly the humble motifs reinforcing the simplicity of their soberly translated soul. But he also adores the sumptuous symphonies in which the greens, the reds and the golds sing, as he lets himself be charmed by the veil of a mist.
La Petite Gironde; Bordeaux, France; 11 June 1918

The painter Louis Dewis has just made a small exhibition of his works at the Galerie Marguy [Paris], which has obtained the greatest and most legitimate success. This excellent painter, whose talent asserts itself at each new exhibition, this time gives us landscapes quite crowned with success. We must mention in particular: The Reapers, a very luminous work; The Canal at Bruges, of a character well interpreted; St. Jean de Luz, which shines with the sun of the South; The Stone Bridge at Rouen, etc., but we should mention them all.
Ève: le premier quotidien illustré de la femme; Paris, France; 17 April 1920

The noted Belgian art and literary critic Henry Dommartin (sometimes spelled Henri) met Dewis at the 1917 exhibition and became a fervent admirer of his fellow countryman's work. He once served as the State Librarian at Brussels and had heroically engineered the rescue of truckloads of Belgian art treasures from what was almost certain destruction shortly after the Germans occupied Belgium in 1914. Dommartin was the first and most insistent among Dewis's circle of friends to argue that the artist should concentrate solely on his art.

From this period until his death in Biarritz in 1946, Dewis's landscapes were shown regularly at major exhibitions across western Europe. They attracted favorable reviews in the international press, purchases from major museums and the highest decorations from the governments of three countries. However, the highest achievement of fame eluded him.

True, Dewis had finally escaped the dictates of his overbearing father that had stymied his career for almost three decades. He was now free to focus on painting. He could spend more time in the studio in his family's large apartment at 36-40 Rue de St-Cathérine over the Maison Dewachter in Bordeaux. But, his career would be marked by uncommon public relations misfortune. As daughter Andrée (bilingual, like her sister) would say in English many years later, "Dad had hard luck!"

== Georges Petit - the opportunity of a lifetime turns to disaster ==
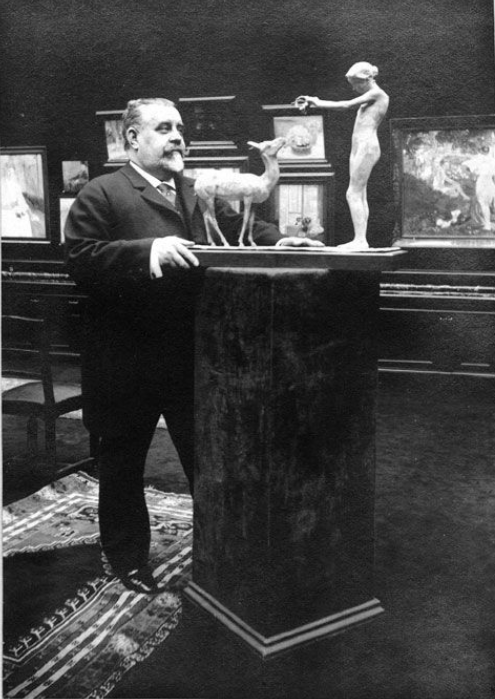
Georges Petit

The renowned and influential French art dealer, Georges Petit, was impressed by the Belgian's work at the 1917 exhibition in Bordeaux". His initial reaction, as he once told Dewis, was "vous êtes un tendre" ("you are tender-hearted").

The support of the owner of Galerie Georges Petit could be life-changing. According to Émile Zola, who knew the Parisian art world inside and out, Petit was "the 'apotheosis' of dealers when the Impressionist market soared and competition among marchands... became intense."

Petit had attained the highest degree of success and influence in his profession. His historic Expositions internationales de Peinture had featured works by Claude Monet, Camille Pissarro, Pierre-Auguste Renoir, Auguste Rodin, John Singer Sargent, Alfred Sisley and James McNeill Whistler – and he conducted the sales of the works of Degas, after that artist's death in 1917.

He pressured Dewis – scolding him that he was wasting his life "selling clothes. Petit urged him to sell his interest in Maison Dewachter and move to Paris – telling him, "come paint for me in Paris and I will make you famous."

Finally, Dewis relented. He sold his majority interest in Dewachter frères and relocated his family from Bordeaux to Paris in May 1919. But, only a year later, Georges Petit was dead at the age of 64.

Dewis was on his own... and he was no self-promoter.

== Painting for himself ==
In turning his career over to Petit, Dewis had taken the biggest risk of his life and lost.

He found himself in Paris without a sponsor. He, of course, still had resources from the sale of his business. So, the former merchant rented an atelier and began painting for public exhibition. From the beginning, his work was highly regarded and well reviewed, as this 1921 appraisal by the art critic at Paris' Revue moderne des arts et de la vie (Modern Review of the Arts and Life) attests:

Few landscape artists, in my opinion, among our modern painters, reach such a profound expression of truth in a finer art form. This artist knows admirably how to compose his paintings, while maintaining a note of reality which removes any impression of being formulaic. Modern, clearly, by the richness of the palette, by the skillful distribution of color and light, by the creation of this true atmosphere so rarely achieved, it nevertheless continues the high tradition of the old masters by the consciousness of drawing, respect for perspective and harmony of composition.

And all these elements combine to create real life on the canvas, palpitating with the intimate emotion of the artist before nature.

Dewis's work was never heavily promoted. He had arrived at the conclusion that Petit's prowess as a marchand d'art (art dealer) complemented to his own talents. But, now involuntarily and independently, Dewis simply did not have the drive – nor the desire – to achieve commercial success.

Dewis's son-in-law, Jérôme Ottoz, was also a recipient of the Chevalier de la Légion d’Honneur – recognition for his accomplishments in business. He is thought to have resented his talented and more famous father-in-law. Jérôme possessed a demeanor reminiscent of Isidore's and, as such, dominated the timid artist, even at one point talking Dewis out of accepting a lucrative offer of sponsorship by another Parisian art dealer.

Eventually, Dewis reconciled himself to his fate. And, happily so. He was perfectly content painting what he wanted to paint... and not producing what was in fashion or what art promoters thought would "sell." He was free to experiment with different techniques, as daughter Yvonne recalled:

He tried the impressionist style and the pointille and the heavy brush stroke – improving every time – but always his coloring, regardless of his method, was gorgeous. His skies were breathtaking and his water flowing on and on carrying you along in a dream.

He told his family, "I paint as the bird sings" – for the pure joy of expressing his emotions.

== Between the World Wars ==
Dewis exhibited throughout France and Belgium in the 1920s and 30s, as well as in Germany, Switzerland and what were at the time the French colonies of Algeria and Tunisia. Collectors and museums from Europe, South America and Japan purchased his work.

Critics commented on the maturation of his art – such as in this 1929 review by Brussel's Het Laatste Nieuws.

The superb works that the painter Louis Dewis has just hung in our theater deserve the deepest interest.

Although Dewis has long been established in France, he is still able to communicate admirably that special and intimate feeling that is found in many corners of Flanders and Wallonia, recreating them with the enthusiasm of his artistic soul, yet faithful and true.

The art of Louis Dewis appears in the magnificent maturity of a learned and profound spirit of observation put at the service of a firm technique, devoid of any indication of contrivances in pursuit of effects. Everything proves that among our Belgian artists, Dewis does not occupy a secondary position.

The Flemish critic at Het Volk also remarked on the sincerity of Dewis's work after visiting the same exhibition.

No clutter, no affected detail, but rather works of broad design and which, in powerful touches, express the emotions and aspirations of the artist.

Unlike the younger painter of Bordeaux described by his daughter Yvonne – in Paris, Dewis devoted nearly all of his time to painting in his atelier at 28 rue Chaptal or sketching at locations across France and Belgium. He was prolific, selling hundreds of paintings in his career.

=== International recognition ===
Although he concentrated on his art only in the last 30 years of his life, he was well known in France and Belgium for his high profile in the clothing industry – and his civic and charitable activities.

He served as the president of an organization in the South of France that worked in the interests of the suffering population of Belgium – and refugees from that country – during the Great War. He gained international attention for publicly urging the French government to treat Belgians with less suspicion (as potential German collaborators) and more compassion.

His efforts on behalf of his Belgian countrymen during WWI were recognized by the French Republic with the Grande Médaille de la Reconnaissance française (Grand Medal of French Gratitude).

In 1932, France named him a Chevalier de la Légion d’Honneur for "more than 30 years of artistic practice."

He was named an Officier d'Académie (Silver Palms) in 1912, when he was still painting as an amateur, and he was named Officier de l'Instruction Publique (Golden Palms) in 1922, three years after relocating to Paris.

Belgium awarded him the King Albert Medal and named him a Knight of the Order of Leopold II.

Tunisia made him an Officer of the Order of Glory.

His art was included in multiple Salons – taking a prize in 1930 – and it received the high honor of being chosen for Paris' Exposition Internationale des Arts et Techniques dans la Vie Moderne (1937).

What critics judged to be one of his most beautiful canvases, Vue de Bruges (View of Bruges), was purchased by the French Republic for the Palace of the League of Nations in Geneva, Switzerland.

Dewis was a Lauréat of the Société des Artistes Français, an associate member of the Société Nationale des Beaux-Arts, a founding member of the Salon des Tuileries and of the Société des peintres du Paris moderne and of the Société royale des beaux-arts of Belgium, among others.

== Final years at Biarritz ==
Dewis and his family fled Paris for the South West shortly before the Nazi occupation of 1940, initially staying with relatives in Bayonne.

Nearby, they heard of a villa that was becoming available in Biarritz. An American was heading back to the United States and selling a large house that he had named for his wife: Villa Pat. The family purchased the home and it was here that Dewis would paint for the last seven years of his life.

Biarritz wasn't far from Bordeaux, where Dewis had lived from the age of 14 to his marriage and from 1908-1919.

He was once again inspired by the countryside of the Pays Basque.

Since travel was greatly limited during the occupation, Dewis often found his subjects within his own garden, in nearby parks and along the Atlantic coast.

=== Contemporary assessment of his career ===
Louis Dewis died of cancer at Villa Pat in late 1946. Bordeaux's Sud-Ouest newspaper, successor to La Petite Gironde, which had been administered decades earlier by his maternal grandfather, published its lamentations under the headline, "A Painter Is No Longer With Us."

[A] great painter has just passed away in Biarritz: Louis Dewis.

The man was as good as the painter, for whom Biarritz, Bayonne and the Basque Coast quite often manifested a sincere admiration since he retired to the resort.

Through his acclaimed talent, he brought something new to this region, for which, as well as for the painting, his death is a great sorrow.

The critic at the Journal of Biarritz had no trouble finding the word that he felt best described Dewis:

If we have to characterize Dewis's talent in a word, we could say that he was one of the most sincere landscape painters of modern times. Behind the big strokes which he was particularly fond of, a quivering emotion can always be felt, since Dewis painted with his heart as much as his brushes.

He was buried in the family tomb at Bordeaux's Cimetière de la Chartreuse.

== A legacy in hibernation ==
Dewis's devoted daughter Andrée had returned to live in her Paris co-propriété (condominium) after the war ended. Except for the period of occupation, the flat in the 17th arrondissement of Paris was her home from 1935 until her death in 2002. The spacious apartment, just a few blocks from the Parc Monceau, occupied the entire top floor of a 19th-century building.

Andrée had made many extended visits to Biarritz during her father's illness. After he died, she was intent on preserving everything related to his artistic career. She carefully crated up the entire contents of his atelier at Villa Pat. Since she would be staying with her widowed mother in Biarritz for a while, she shipped the crates to Paris for safekeeping in the temporary custody of two trusted nephews, the noted architects Édouard Niermans (1903–1984) and Jean Niermans (1897–1989), Officier de la Légion d’Honneur (fr:Jean Niermans). Their father, Édouard-Jean Niermans (fr:Édouard-Jean Niermans) (1859–1928), celebrated as the architect of the "Café Society" and Chevalier de la Légion d’Honneur, married Dewis's sister, Louise Marie Héloïse DeWachter (1871–1963), in 1895. Dewis was very close to Louise and in her home the artist socialized with the likes of Auguste Renoir and Jules Chéret.

Eventually, the boxes would be transferred to the attic of Andrée's co-propriété and placed in a locked room that was originally designed as maid's quarters. There the sturdy wooden boxes would sit, untouched, for nearly 50 years.

== Dewis rediscovered ==
Dewis’s art had survived and blossomed despite the opposition of his father, the devastating loss of Petit, an antagonistic son-in-law and two world wars.

But now, it was all locked away and collecting dust. Jérôme had absolutely no interest in any effort to construct a legacy for his deceased rival.

As the years passed, Andrée had all but given up hope that her beloved father might be remembered.

By the mid-1990s, Jérôme was dead. Through a chance conversation with a visiting great-nephew from the States (a grandson of her sister Yvonne), the then 92-year-old Andrée and the young American opened the crates and immediately resolved to return Dewis's work to the public.

The more than 400 paintings and hundreds of sketches that they found were catalogued. Experts were retained to evaluate the vast collection and what were judged to be the most outstanding pieces were cleaned and properly framed for public exhibition.

The effort culminated in the exhibition Dewis Rediscovered at the Courthouse Galleries in Portsmouth, Virginia in 1998. It was the first public showing of Dewis's art in more than half a century.

=== Historical perspective ===
Dr. Linda McGreevy wrote essays for the catalogues for the first two Dewis exhibits in America. McGreevy, who was a professor of art history and criticism and the chair of the Art Department at Old Dominion University in Norfolk, Virginia, is an expert in French art between the two world wars. She described how Dewis's art was rediscovered in the attic of the Paris flat of Dewis/DeWachter's daughter:

On the walls of the apartment in which she'd lived for over fifty years were works not only by her father but by Jean-Baptiste-Camille Corot. During the course of this visit, and others over the next several months, [Andrée] recalled that there were probably more of her father's work stored in the attic, though she figured they'd probably all rotted away inasmuch as they'd been there since his death in 1946. What they found were... crates that, while caked in dust, the paintings themselves were in remarkably good condition. And stored in the ceiling were still more rolled canvases, numerous sketchbooks, journals, even his palette.

Louis Dewis was hardly an unknown artist in his time, but then again, he was no Monet or Degas either (both of whom he knew intimately). Louis Dewis's work resembles most closely that of Corot, who was his strongest influence, except that it tends to borrow from the Impressionists a more resplendent use of color. Dewis painted mostly landscapes, those of the Belgian towns and countryside he knew all his life. But by the end of WW II, the popular art styles of the time had not only changed drastically but the art world he'd known had fled Paris entirely. When he died, it was as if he took his life's work with him, except for less than a dozen examples in family hands in this country, and the few on the walls of his daughter's apartment in Paris. However, thanks to the perseverance of [Dewis's American great-grandson] and... the Portsmouth Art Museum, the work of Louis Dewis, and perhaps his spirit too, have returned from the dead...

The Belgian ambassador to the United States, Alex Reyn, was an honored guest at Dewis Rediscovered, after which he requested that three Dewis paintings be lent for permanent exhibition in his country's embassy in Washington, DC. Personally making the selections, he chose Snow in the Ardennes as the only painting to be displayed in the anteroom to the ambassador's office.

In the catalogue for 2002's Encore: Dewis Rediscovered, Professor McGreevy observed that "art history has worked against Dewis's inclusion" in what she described as "the modernist pantheon" which was:

... continuing to relegate artists solely concerned with landscape to a lower echelon, following a hierarchy of subject matter established in the 17th century. It's only in the last decade that the history of art in mid-War France has been reevaluated and expanded in scope. This is significant for Dewis, since his most productive period spanned those two decades.

Now he seems poised, like so many others, to claim a place in modernism's broader trajectory. His contributions to the French version of Regionalism, his luminous paintings from the pristine reaches of Frances arriere-pays (back country), alongside the Corot-inspired images of his native Belgium recovering slowly from the war's ravages, may well receive the recognition their creator deserved long ago.

Since their rediscovery in 1996, more than 100 of Dewis's paintings found in his daughter's attic have been cleaned and framed and are lent to museums for the public to enjoy.

=== Orlando Museum of Art ===
On 1 May 2018, the Orlando Museum of Art (OMA) announced that it may become the permanent home of the rediscovered collection of Dewis paintings and related materials.

OMA staged a mini-exhibition of Dewis works beginning in May 2018 and a full exhibit of more than 100 Dewis paintings in January 2019. In the catalogue for that exhibition, OMA Senior Curator Hansen Mulford provided this perspective:

While his earliest works were influenced by Impressionism, he quickly developed a personal style of expressive realism in line with this mainstream in French art of the 1920s and 30s. His paintings of regional locales throughout France featured views that were idealized and imbued with a sense of place. Dewis’s works draw upon classical models of French landscape painting such as those of Camille Corot. His compositions are balanced and orderly, following the conventions of depicting deep space through a recession of forms and aerial perspective. Broad planes of color define the topography, land, water, sky, and architecture, while bold diagonal elements like roads and rivers draw the eye into the scene. His brushwork is often quick and direct, rendering forms clearly without excessive detail. Though his style is anchored in a historic tradition, the simplicity of his best work is wholly modern and aligned with his contemporaries.

While descriptive detail enriches all of Dewis’s paintings, he rarely painted directly from life. Instead, he worked from drawings, which allowed him to edit and distill the expressive elements of each scene. Observed impressions were important, but memory was essential to his practice, allowing him the distance to find his own order in each composition. About this he said, "it is this memory that, transmuted by my sensitivity, gives to my works life and this truth that you love to find there." While Dewis was a realist, he was also interested in creating emotional resonance with his painting that did not require excessive detail, saying "I never seek a slavish copy of nature. This is the fundamental thought of the art of Corot, Cazin, Cézanne, Van Gogh, Gauguin, and which the latter expresses through the aphorism: 'In painting there is suggestion rather than description.'”

OMA opened another exhibit of Dewis's work on 24 September 2020, which continued until 1 May 2022.

The Dewis Collection continues discussions with Orlando and recently other cities in the U.S. and abroad relative to the creation of a home for the Collection – to make the Belgian’s work available for the public to enjoy on a permanent basis.

== Gallery ==
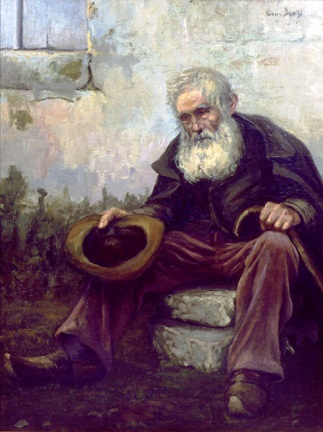
The Old Beggar (Bordeaux, France), 1916, shown at Le Salon franco-belge in 1917, where Dewis's work was first seen by Georges Petit

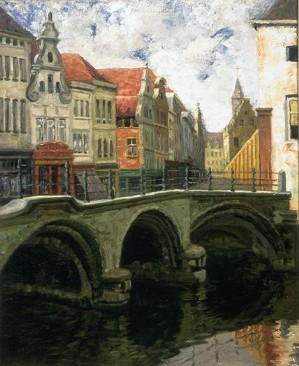
Dyle Bridge at Mechelen, Belgium, c. 1919

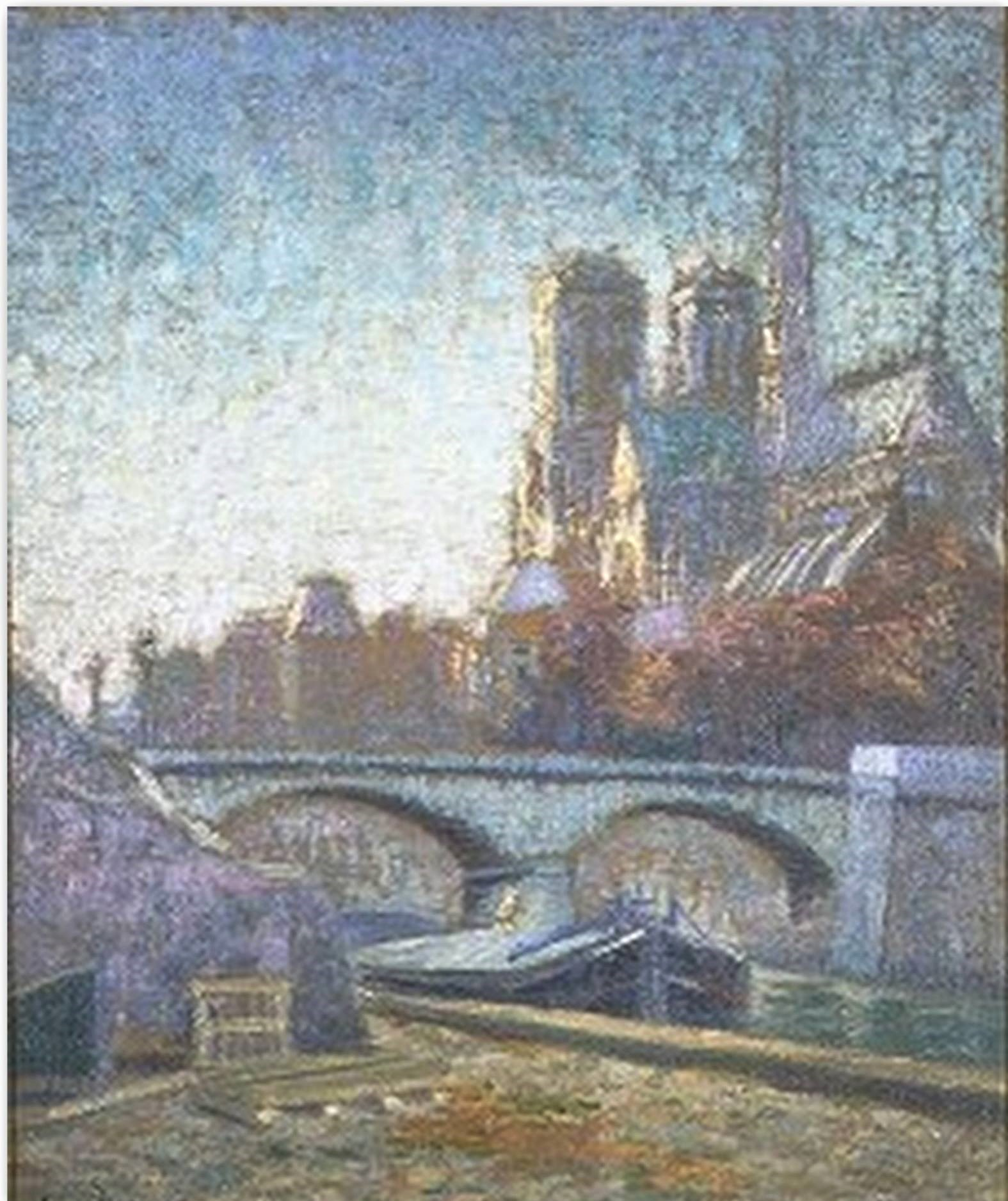
Notre Dame, 1919

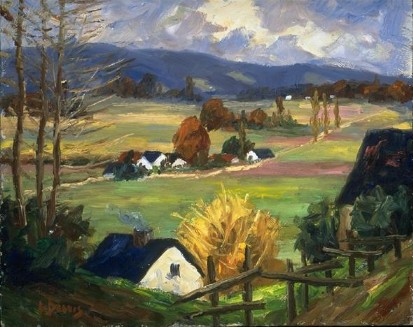
Valley in the Belgian Ardennes, c. 1920

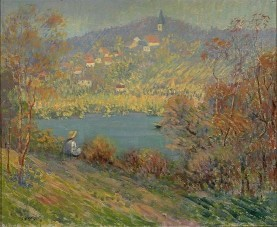
Andrée, the Little Fisherwoman, 1922

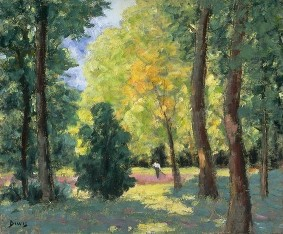
Morning Landscape, 1926

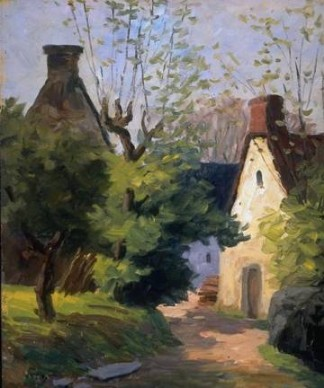
The Village Road - Auvergne, c. 1929

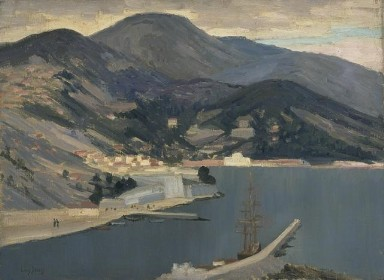
Port of Villefranche, honored at the 1930 Salon

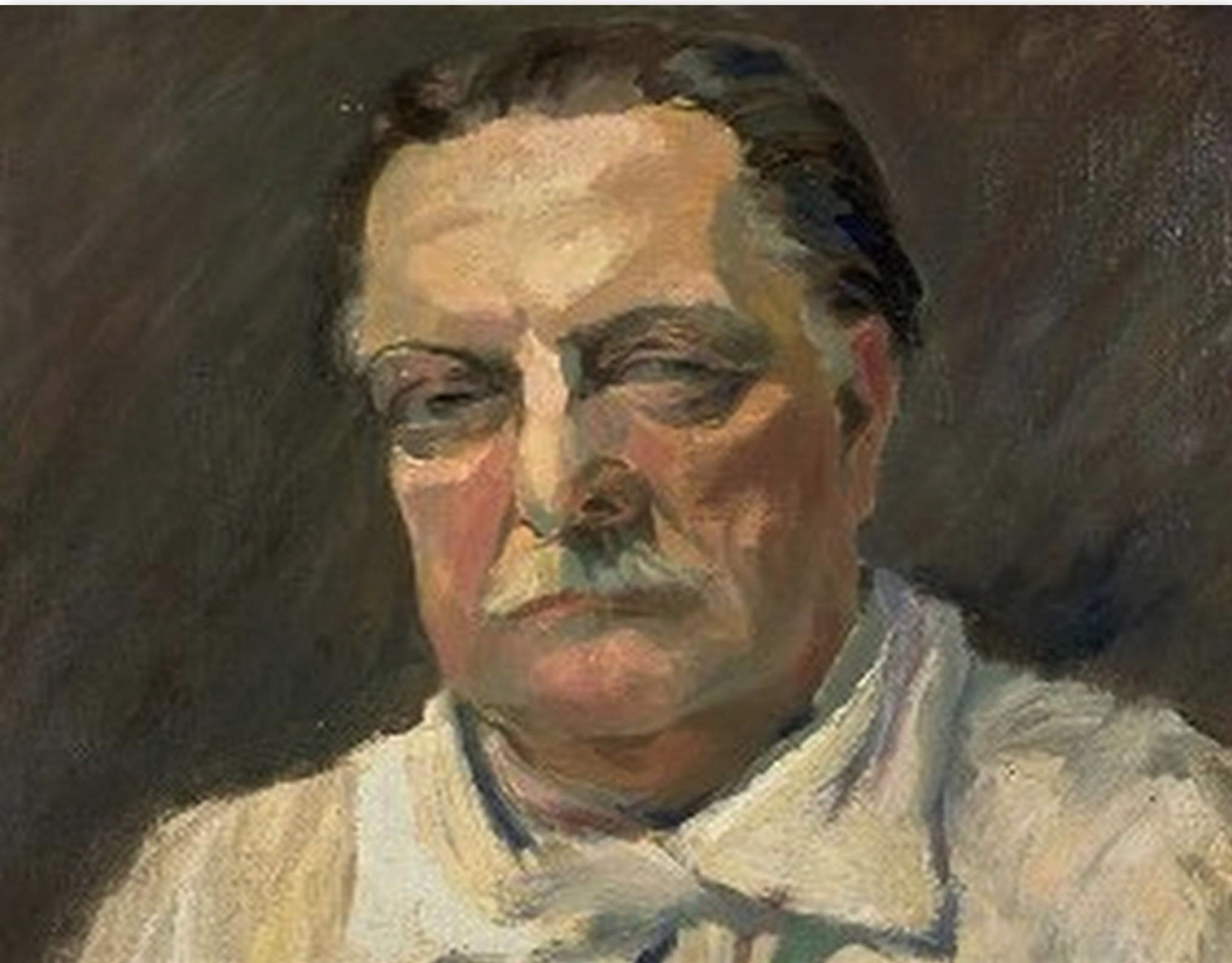
Self Portrait, c. 1940

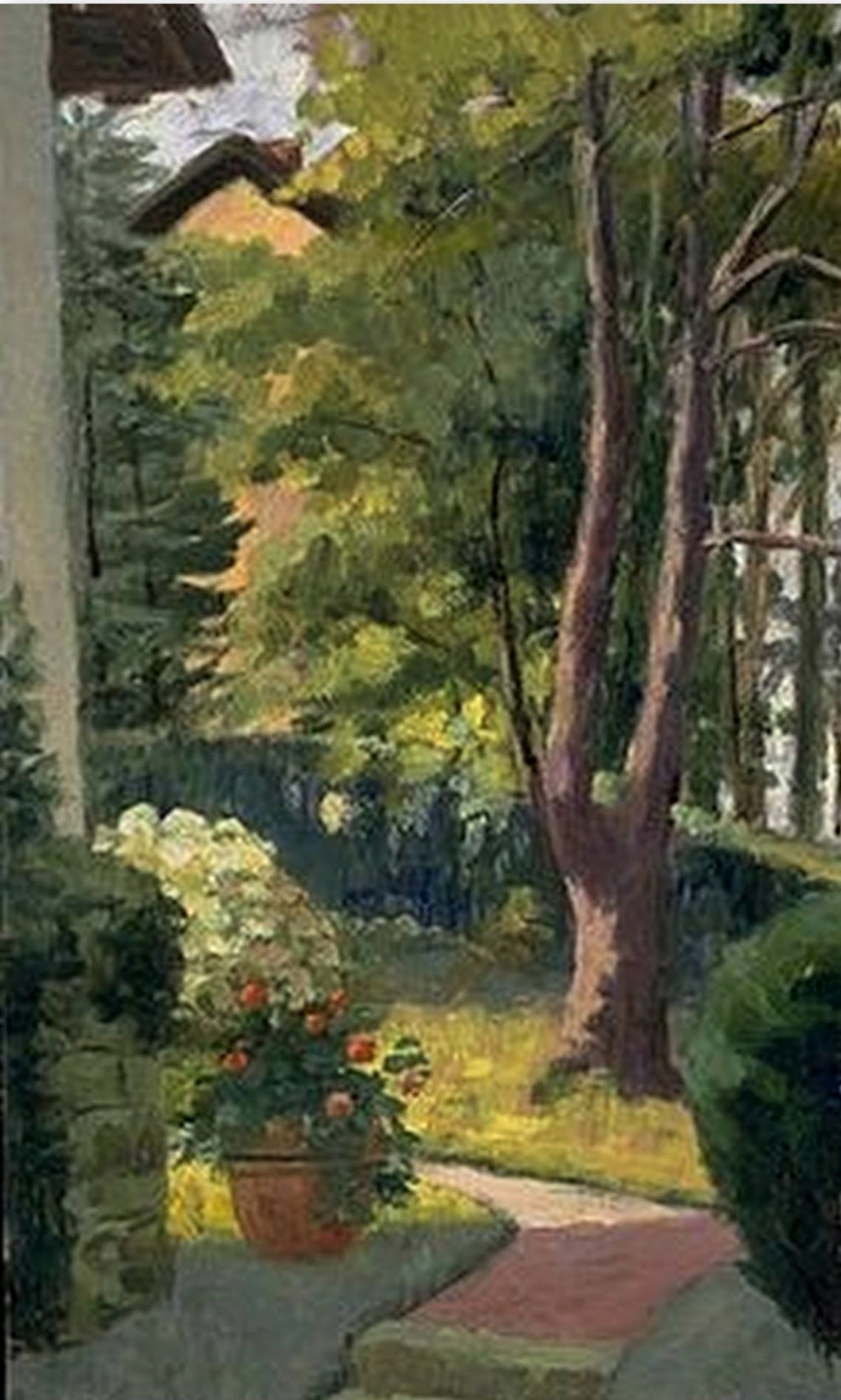
The Garden at Villa Pat, 1940

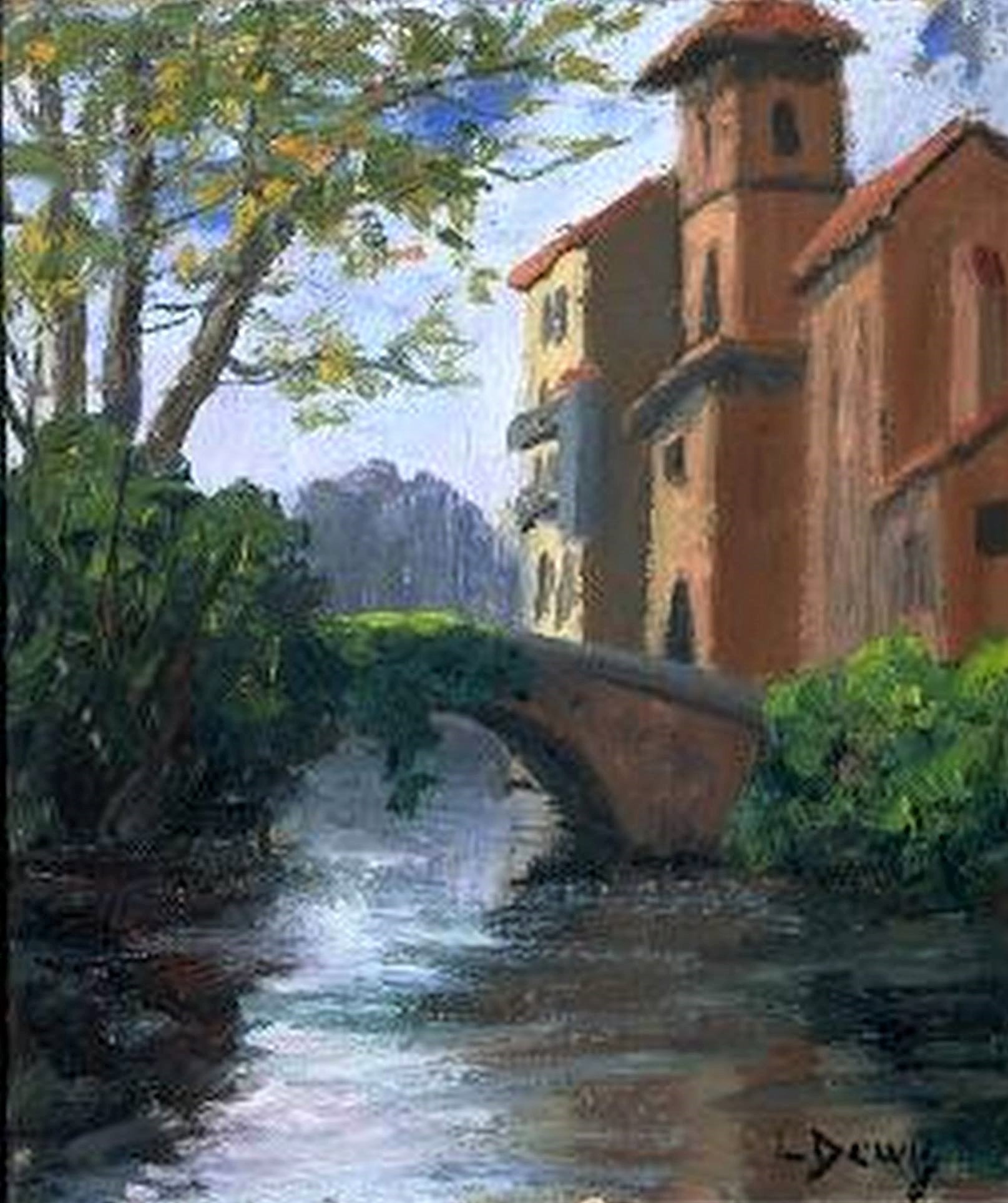
Bridge at Saint-Jean-Pied-de-Port, 1940

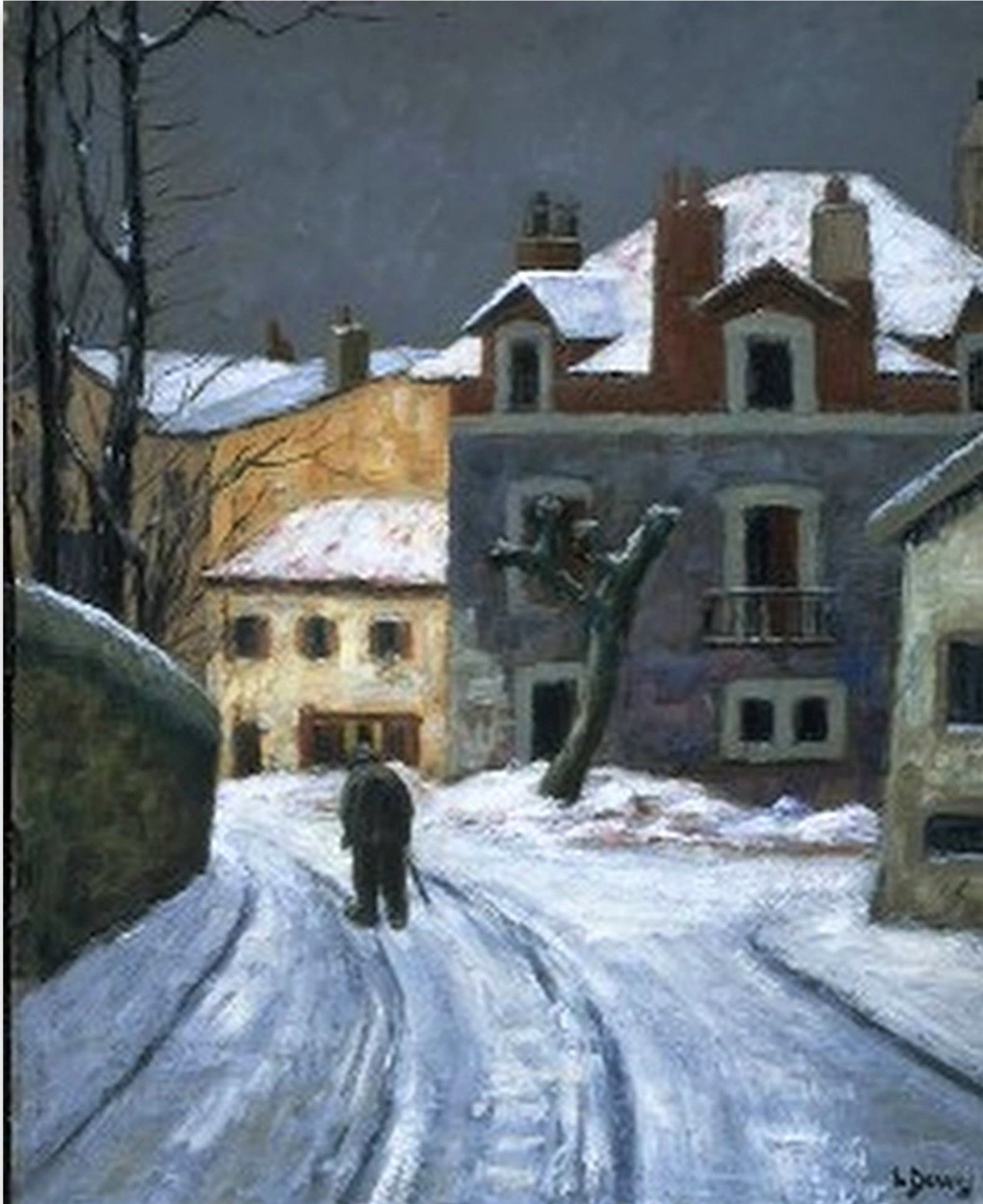
Snow in Biarritz, 1942

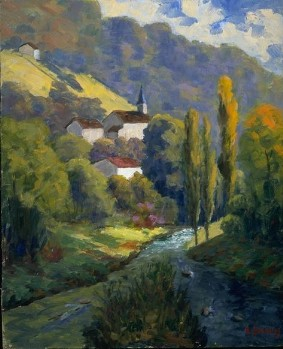
The Village Church, 1945

== Sources ==
- Catalogues for Dewis Rediscovered (1998) and Encore: Dewis Rediscovered (2002), Courthouse Galleries, Portsmouth, Virginia
- L'avenir de la Dordogne (Périgueux, France), 5 January 1918
- La Petite Gironde (Bordeaux, France), 11 June 1918
- Memoirs of Yvonne DeWachter Robinson Young
- Transcribed interviews with Andrée DeWachter Ottoz (1995–2001)
- LouisDewis.com
- YouTube Video of "Dewis Rediscovered" Exhibition at Portsmouth, Virginia in 1998
