= Georges Petit =

French art dealer (1856–1920)

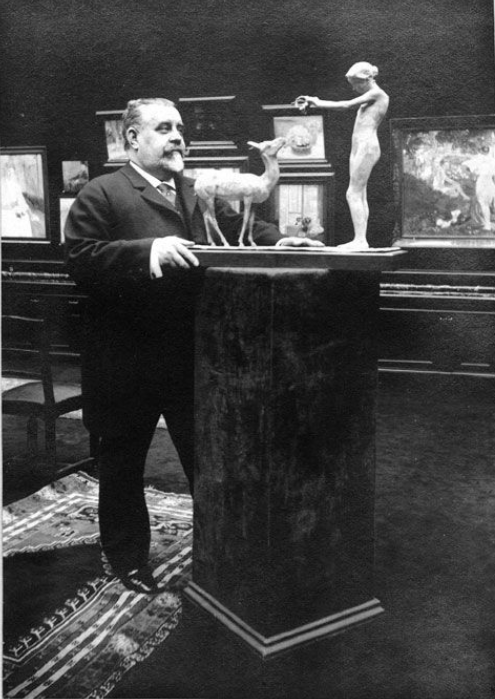
Georges Petit

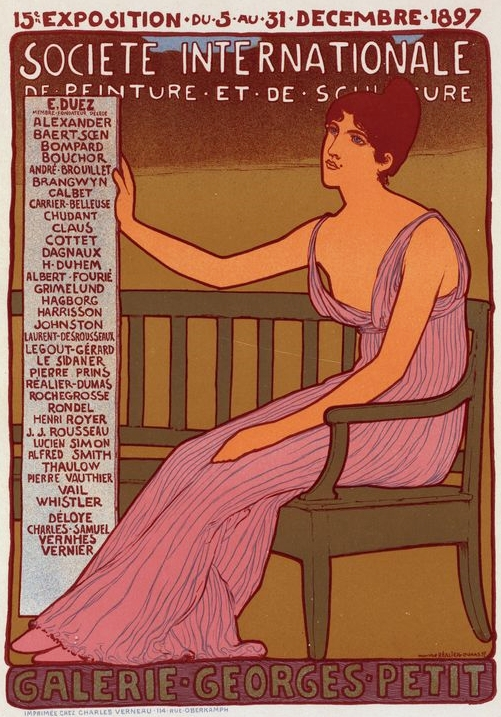
Poster by Maurice Réalier-Dumas (1860–1928) for the 15th "Exposition de la Société internationale de Peinture et de sculpture" at the galerie Georges Petit in Paris in 1897.

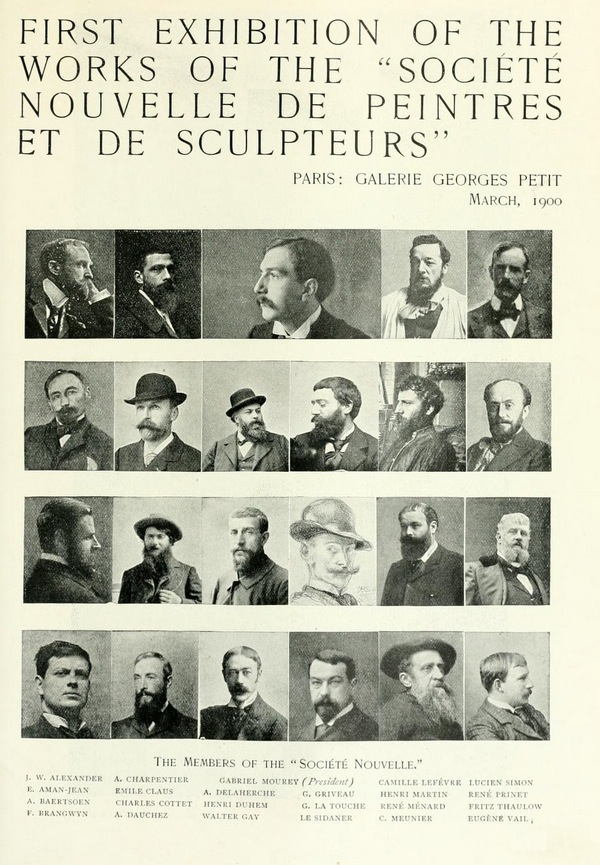
March 1900 Announcement in The Studio of the First Exhibition of the Société Nouvelle de Peintres et de Sculpteurs at the Galerie Georges Petit in Paris.

Georges Petit (French pronunciation: [ʒɔʁʒ pəti]; 11 March 1856 – 12 May 1920) was a French art dealer, a key figure in the Paris art world and an important promoter and cultivator of Impressionist artists.

== Early career ==
Petit was the son of François Petit, who founded the firm of art dealers at 7, rue Saint-Georges (Paris) in 1846. Within just a few years, the Galerie François Petit was among the most powerful firms in the French art market.

According to Robert Jensen in his book Marketing Modernism in Fin-de-Siecle Europe, the auction house assumed, "multiple roles that ran the gamut from certifying the authenticity of the object, to guiding it through the hazards of the marketplace, to establishing its provenance and enlisting critics and historians to situate the artist's importance."

Georges Petit inherited the firm, as well as a château and 3 million francs in 1877. He constructed a town house on the rue de Sèze. His annual expenses amounted to some 400,000 francs. That's what he spent to support his wife, children, mistress... and shooting expenses.

Jensen quotes Émile Zola as saying that the younger Petit was "more ambitious than his father… competitive to the point of wanting to ruin his rivals". Jensen continues, "[Petit] would wait… for the Americans to arrive in Paris every May. And what he bought for 10,000 francs, he sold for 40,000.

=== Impressionism ===
Petit began buying Impressionist works as early as 1878, when he served as an expert in the sales of works from the collections of Jean Victor Louis Faure and bankrupt former Claude Monet patron, Ernest Hoschedé. Petit was just 22 years old at this time — and it was only a year after he inherited the business — so his involvement with the Impressionists began with the commencement of his career. However, according to a biography at the National Gallery of Art (USA), this was at the end of the Impressionists' "lean years," and their works had already begun to find a market.

== Rivalries and rise to prominence ==
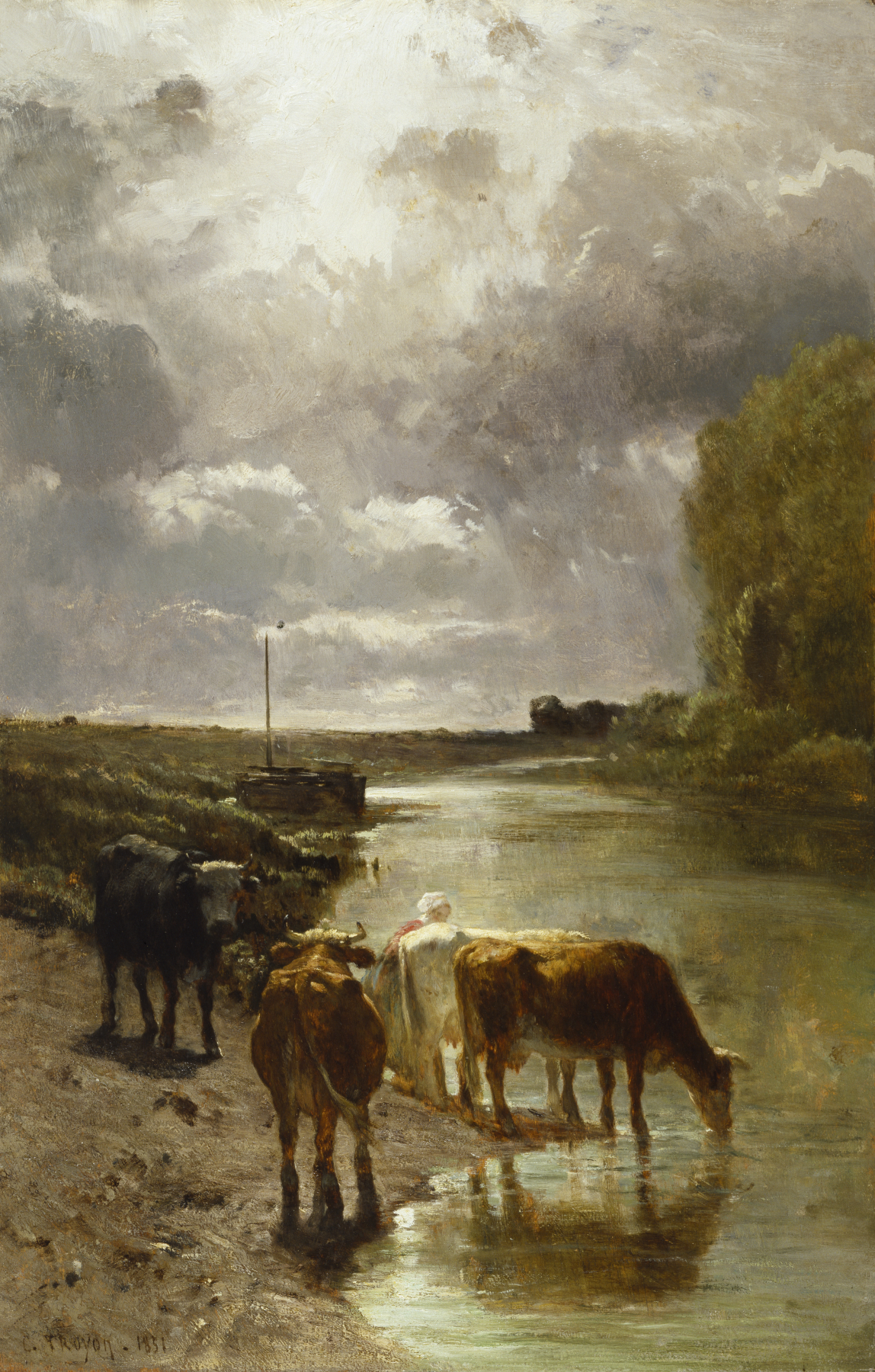
Cattle Drinking is a painting by Constant Troyon, exhibited in 1883 in the galleries of Georges Petit.

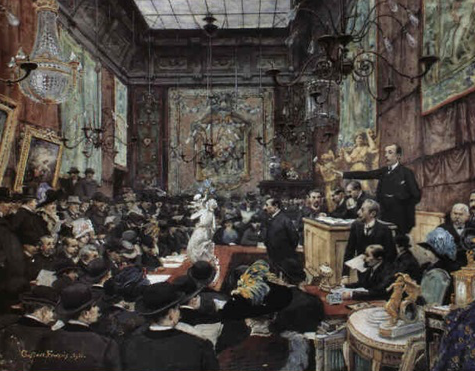
Auction Scene / Galerie Georges Petit (1911), watercolor by Gustave Francois, courtesy ArtNet.com

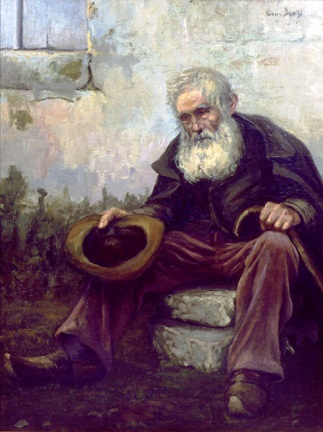
The Old Beggar (1916) by Louis Dewis, seen by Petit in 1917 at Le Salon franco-belge at the Bordeaux Public Garden, after which Petit offered Dewis his patronage.

Petit had an intense rivalry with art dealer Paul Durand-Ruel (1831–1922). Durand-Ruel took over his business from his father in 1865. The Petit and Durand-Ruel galleries had been the top two firms in Paris dating back to the 1850s. Paul Durand-Ruel was 25 years older than Petit and had become an advocate of the Impressionists as early as 1870.

The gallery which Petit opened at 12, Rue Godot de Mauroy in 1881 was a popular alternative exhibition space to the official Salon. Petit's gallery later relocated to 8, rue de Sèze in the heart of Paris.

Petit made his private views into grand social occasions. He devised the series of Expositions internationales de Peinture, the first of which was held in 1882. John Singer Sargent sent his portrait of Vernon Lee to the inaugural event, a work which received decidedly mixed reviews. Sargent wrote, "it has been exhibited … and has consternated many people."

These events attracted the likes of Claude Monet, Camille Pissarro, Pierre-Auguste Renoir, Auguste Rodin, Alfred Sisley and James McNeill Whistler.

Sisley held large retrospective exhibitions at the Galerie Georges Petit in the 1880s and 1890s. This was something of a coup for Petit, as Sisley had been previously associated with Durand-Ruel. In 1897, Petit exhibited 146 Sisley paintings and 5 of his pastels, covering the whole of his career. Two years later, just months after Sisley's death, the paintings remaining in Sisley's atelier were sold at auction by the Galerie Georges Petit to the benefit of his children.

=== "Formidable salesman" ===
The biography posted by the National Gallery of Art notes that, "Petit also dealt in Salon painters and handled the works of many successful and fashionable artists of the period, rivaling another Parisian dealer, Boussod & Valadon [successors to Goupil & Cie]. He enjoyed the reputation of being a 'formidable salesman', and most important Paris auctions... were held on his premises because the Hôtel Drouot accommodations were insufficient. This fact only increased his rivalry with Durand-Ruel, as Petit did not care to have his competitor officiate as 'expert' at public sales held in his gallery".

Michael C. FitzGerald, writing in his book The Making of Modernism, says that, "by the 1890s [Petit had] wrested many of the Impressionists from their first dealer, Durand-Ruel, and presented such important exhibitions as Monet's Morning on the Seine and Norman coast series. According to Émile Zola, who knew the Parisian art world inside and out, Petit was the 'apotheosis' of dealers when the Impressionist market soared and competition among marchands... became intense."

Petit held a number of auction sales on his premises, including the Narishkine collection in 1883, the Chocquet and Doria collections in 1889 and Edgar Degas' studio sale in 1918–19.

In 1919, Petit convinced Louis Dewis, a Sunday painter from Bordeaux, to sell his substantial men's clothing business there and move to Paris, where Petit promised "to make him famous." But just months after the Post-Impressionist relocated, Petit died on May 12, 1920.

The biographer at the Whistler Centre writes that Petit's Société internationale de Peinture was run on similar principles to the Grosvenor Gallery. Like the Grosvenor, it had an advisory body of artists (including Alfred Stevens, Raimundo de Madrazo y Garreta and Giuseppe De Nittis), but in fact was run by Petit alone. Other artists such as Paul Baudry, Jean-Léon Gérôme, Jozef Israëls, Lawrence Alma-Tadema, John Everett Millais, Ludwig Knaus and Adolph Friedrich Erdmann von Menzel were also involved.

According to the Whistler Centre, beginning in 1881, "the gallery was associated with print publishing and specialised in monochrome, very high quality reproductive engravings of paintings by contemporary artists such as Félix Bracquemond and Marcellin Desboutin".

In 1887, Auguste Rodin exhibited The Kiss and three figures from The Burghers of Calais at the Galerie. In 1889, Rodin and Monet held a joint exposition there, with Rodin showing 36 works. According to the August Rodin Project, the "Georges Petit exhibition sealed Rodin’s position as France’s premier sculptor and opened doors to collections and museums around the world."

In the late 1880s, Petit turned down Louis-Ambroise Vollard (1866–1939) for an apprenticeship because he knew no foreign languages. Vollard would, himself, become an art dealer... as well as a collector and publisher. Vollard played a role in the careers of Paul Cézanne, Maillol, Picasso, Rouault, Gauguin and Vincent van Gogh.

== The Galerie after Petit ==
After Petit's death, the Galerie Georges Petit was acquired by prominent art dealers/brothers Gaston and Josse Bernheim-Jeune and their partner Étienne Bignou. George Keller, who was establishing a relationship with Salvador Dalí at this time, became director in 1929.

Henri Matisse held at large retrospective at the Galerie in 1931, the largest exhibition of his works in France to that date.

In 1932, the Galerie hosted an important retrospective of the works of Pablo Picasso. Art historian Michael C. FitzGerald writes that, "displaying 225 paintings, seven sculptures, and six illustrated books, the exhibition was a blockbuster. Apart from sheer size, the show ranged across Picasso's career from 1900 to the early months of 1932."

FitzGerald opines, "the Galerie George Petit was a paradigm of the new relationships among dealers and collectors that formed in the early thirties." He continues, "although bearing an illustrious name in the history of modern art, the gallery was far from its origins when the Picasso retrospective hung."

May 1932 exhibit works of Salvador Dali.

December 1932 exhibition 'Wildflowers of Australia" by May Brookes (1874–1938) an Australian-born artist, writer.

The Galerie Georges Petit closed in 1933 and its assets were sold at auction.

== Exhibitions ==
- 1896 - 13me Exposition International

== See also ==
- Bords de la Seine à Argenteuil
- "Online Books by Galerie Georges Petit". onlinebooks.library.upenn.edu.

== Sources ==
- Jensen, Robert, Marketing Modernism in Fin-de-Siecle Europe, 1994;
- Biography at the Centre for Whistler Studies
- National Gallery of Art USA;
- O'Hare, Mary-Kate; John Singer Sargent and Modern Womanhood; The Magazine Antiques; 1 March 2006;
- Stair Sainty Gallery;
- giverny.org;
- Claude Monet virtual museum;
- FitzGerald, Michael C., The Making of Modernism: Picasso and the Creation of the Market for Twentieth-Century Art, 1995;
- Metropolitan Museum of Art, Chronology of the Artist's Life (Rodin);
- Matisse, Henri and Jack D. Flam, Matisse on Art, 1973;
- Exhibition Notes: Cézanne to Picasso: Ambroise Vollard, Patron of the Avant-Garde, The Art Institute of Chicago
- Dalí, Salvadore, The Secret Life of Salvador Dalí, 1993.
- Galerie Georges Petit, 1881–1895: Newly discovered documents | Journal of the History of Collections | Oxford Academic
