= Pitoëff =

Pitoëff is a surname transliterated in French from the Armenian-language surname Питоев (Pitoyev).

The surname may refer to:

- Georges Pitoëff (1884–1939), Russian and French (Russian-born of Armenian origins) actor and theater director
- Sacha Pitoëff (1920–1990), French film actor and theater director, son of Georges
- Ludmilla Pitoëff (1895–1951), French actress, wife of Georges
