= Pierre Berès =

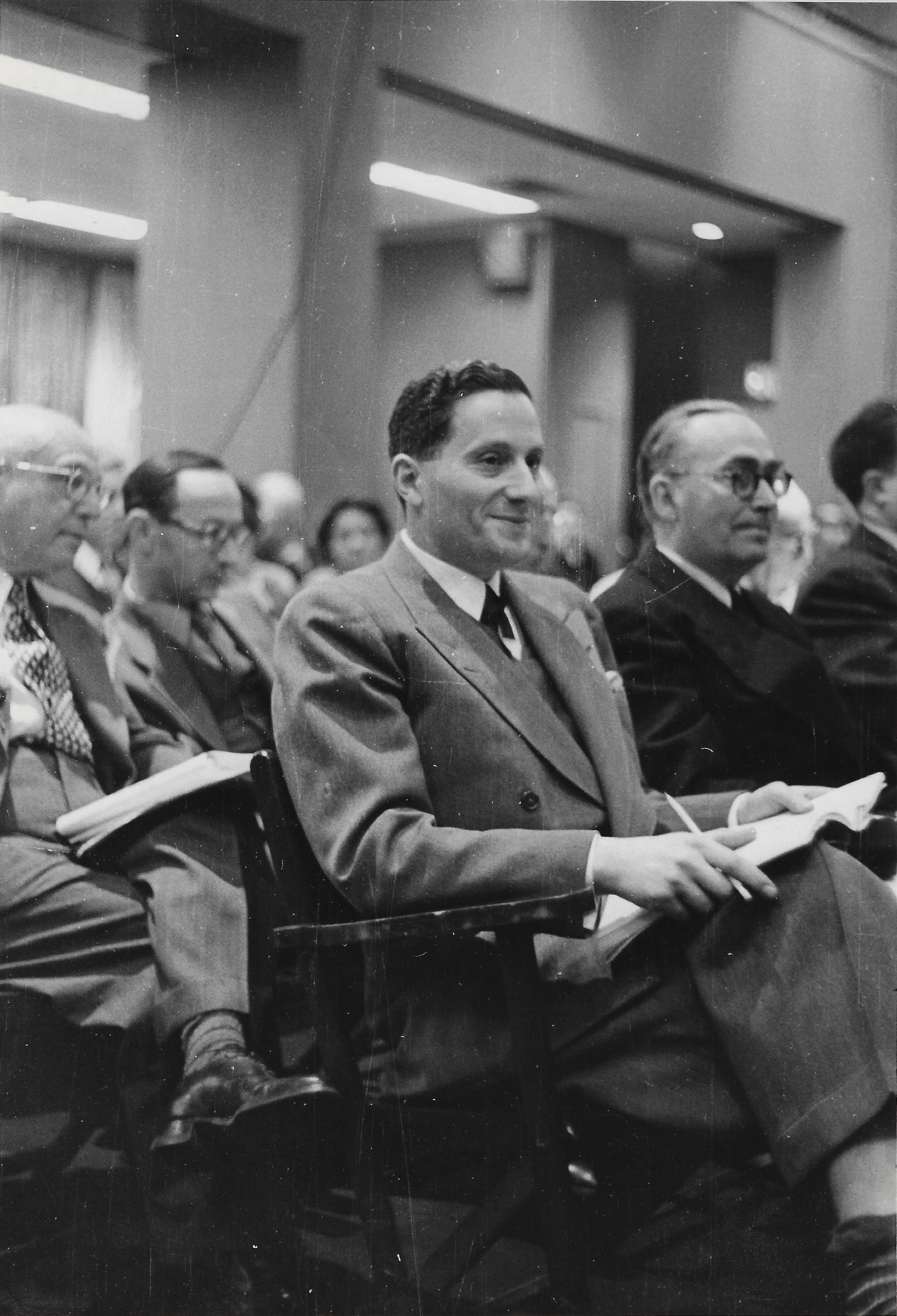
Pierre Bères

Pierre Berès (18 June 1913 – 28 July 2008) was a Swedish born French bookseller, antiquarian book collector, publisher and art collector. He was described as "the king of booksellers" in his New York Times obituary and as "a legendary figure in the world of art, collecting and publishing" by French culture minister Christine Albanel.

== Biography ==
Born in Stockholm, Sweden with the surname Berestovski or Berestov according to different sources, he grew up in Paris and attended Lycée Louis-le-Grand. He began as an autograph collector and quickly moved to books. His fast rise in the world of bookselling included liquidating collections of financially unstable French aristocrats and American millionaires, including Mortimer Schiff and Cortlandt Field Bishop.

He opened a New York branch of his bookstore in 1937, and his Paris shop weathered World War II. He befriended Pablo Picasso after the war. Henri Matisse chose Berès' bookstore to exhibit his "Jazz" series of prints. In 1956 he acquired science publisher Éditions Hermann. In 1959 he was awarded the Legion of Honor.

Rare finds included the manuscript of Louis-Ferdinand Céline's Voyage au bout de la nuit and Arthur Rimbaud's Une Saison en Enfer inscribed by the author to Paul Verlaine.

In 2005, he closed his bookstore in Paris and sold his collection of 12,000 books, which earned over 35 million euros in a series of auctions. He retired to Saint-Tropez, where he died.
