= Michael C. FitzGerald =

American art historian

Michael FitzGerald
- Born: 1953 (age 72–73); New York City, New York, United States
- Education: Stanford University (BA); Columbia University (PhD)

Michael C. FitzGerald (born 1953) is a professor of fine arts and director of the program in art history at Trinity College, Hartford, Connecticut, United States. After his BA in 1976 from Stanford University, FitzGerald obtained both his MBA and PhD degrees from Columbia University in 1986 and 1987 respectively. He has worked for Christie's New York City Art Auction House and for several museums including New York City's Museum of Modern Art and the Whitney Museum of American Art.

FitzGerald has written four books, starting with his 1995 Making Modernism: Picasso and the Creation of a Market for Twentieth-Century Art. He has received grants from the National Endowment for the Arts, the National Endowment for the Humanities and Terra Foundation for American Art.

Although known principally as a scholar on Pablo Picasso, FitzGerald's interests have varied into the role of photography in preserving the record of art history, as in his March 13, 2009, article in the Wall Street Journal on the 19th century Finnish-Swedish scientist Gustaf Nordenskiöld's work with the cliff dwellings of Mesa Verde, Colorado. His articles for the Wall Street Journal include a study of the Inanke prehistoric cave paintings in Matobo National Park in Zimbabwe.
