= Étienne Bignou =

French art dealer

Etienne Bignou
- Born: 3 June 1891; Paris
- Died: 12 December 1950 (aged 59); Paris
- Occupation: Art Dealer

Étienne Bignou (born 1891, d. 1950) was a French art dealer specializing in 19th and 20th century art.

== Biography ==
Bignou first worked with his stepfather, Bonjean, on rue Laffitte, a specialist in ancient art. Bignou took over the gallery in 1909, partnering with The Lefèvre Gallery in London and Alex Reid in Glasgow, which in 1926 joined to create Alex Reid & Lefèvre in London, of which Bignou became a director.

In 1929, in association with Gaston and Josse Bernheim-Jeune, Bignou bought the Georges Petit gallery on Rue de Sèze and appointed Georges Keller as director. Bignou organized a Matisse exhibition there in June–July 1931, Picasso in June–July 1932.

After the closure of the Georges Petit gallery in 1933, Bignou set up the Bignou Gallery in Paris with a branch in New York run by Keller on 57th Street, which opened in 1935. He organized a Renoir exhibition there. After Bignou's death in 1950, Keller continued to run the gallery, then closed it in 1953 and joined Carstairs Gallery. Bignou acted as agent for the American art collector and philanthropist Chester Dale, as well as supplying him with numerous artworks.

According to Lynn H. Nicolas in The Rape of Europa, during World War II, Bignou entered into a profit sharing agreement with Martin Fabiani concerning the shipment of "429 paintings, drawing and watercolors by Renoir, 68 Cézannes, 57 Rouaults, 13 Gauguin, and so forth, to a grand total of 635" artworks. The paintings left on the SS Excalibur from Lisbon, Portugal on September 25, 1940, bound for Bignou's New York gallery, but were seized by the British Navy and H. Montgomery Hyde in Bermuda on October 3 on account of their enemy origin, and of doubts about the sympathies of Fabiani, and stored in Canada until released to Fabiani in 1949.

Bignou had a collection of manuscripts and autographs which was dispersed by Pierre Bérès, from 1975. It included the first manuscript of Céline's Voyage au Bout de la Nuit that the writer had sold to the merchant for ten thousand francs and a painting by Renoir, on May 29, 1943.

Bignou is buried in the Père-Lachaise cemetery (92nd division).

== Nazi-looted art controversies ==
In 1945-6, Bignou was investigated by the OSS Art Looting Investigation Unit for his involvement in dealing in Nazi-looted art and listed as a Red Flag Name.

In recent years, several artworks that passed through Bignou were discovered to have been looted by Nazis or sold in forced sales or under duress by Jewish collectors during the Holocaust.

In 2013, Group of Trees, 1890, a watercolour by Paul Cézanne, "surfaced" at the National Gallery of Canada in Ottawa with a provenance that experts said required further verification as the British navy had seized it in a cargo of artworks sent by art dealer Fabiani to Bignou.

In 2019, the Kunstmuseum in Bern came under scrutiny for Georges F. Keller's donations of artworks by artists like Henri Matisse and Salvador Dalí because of his association with Bignou, who was described as "sulferous" due to his art dealing with Germans during the Nazi occupation of France. The Swiss museum, which had also received artworks from the Gurlitt stash, announced that it would investigate the provenance of artworks donated by George F. Keller since his business partner Bignou collaborated with the Nazis.

== See also ==
- The Holocaust in France

== Notes et references ==
=== Bibliography ===
- Christian Zervos, "Entretien avec Étienne Bignou", Cahiers d'art, 1927, n° 7-8, p. 1-2.
- Ph. Mariot, "Plaques de verre photographiques provenant des archives d'Etienne Bignou", 48/14. Revue du Musée d'Orsay, 2007, n° 25, p. 79.
