= List of Belgian regiments in World War II =

This list covers the regiments of the Belgian Army from 1939 to 1945, from mobilization to the ensuing Battle of Belgium and the Battle of France, along with Free Belgian regiments till 1945. This article covers up every detail on the 18 day campaign (1940) in the Belgian Perspective.

== Divisions ==
22 divisions form the basis of the Belgian Army. A division at full strength had three infantry regiments, an artillery regiment, an engineer battalion, and some transmission troops. Additional arms may include quartermaster companies, tanks, and signal units. Three divisions form a corps.

=== Original six divisions of 1914 ===
1st Infantry Division

2nd Infantry Division

3rd Infantry Division

4th Infantry Division

5th Infantry Division

6th Infantry Division

=== Divisions formed in the mobilization process of 1938-1939 ===
7th Infantry Division

8th Infantry Division

9th Infantry Division

10th Infantry Division

11th Infantry Division

12th Infantry Division

13th Infantry Division

14th Infantry Division

15th Infantry Division

16th Infantry Division

17th Infantry Division

18th Infantry Division

1st Cavalry Division

2nd Cavalry Division

=== Ardennes Hunter divisions (Chasseurs Ardennais) ===
Formed in 1934, they were specifically supposed to hold the Ardennes against attack. There were only two divisions.

1st Division Ardennes Hunters, also known as 1st Division Chasseurs Ardennais

2nd Division Ardennes Hunters, also known as 2nd Division Chasseurs Ardennais

=== Group Ninitte ===
Group Ninitte was a special group of regiments that acted as a flexible reserve and defence force.

== Infantry 1940 ==
Before World War II began, the Belgian Army had only 19 regiments, of which most were regiments of the line. In the ensuing mobilization process of the 1930s, each regiment was split, or reinforced, to form 3 more regiments. There was a traditional distinction between the Line Infantry, Foot Hunters, Carabiners, and Grenadiers, but all uniforms remained the same. (Besides the badges)

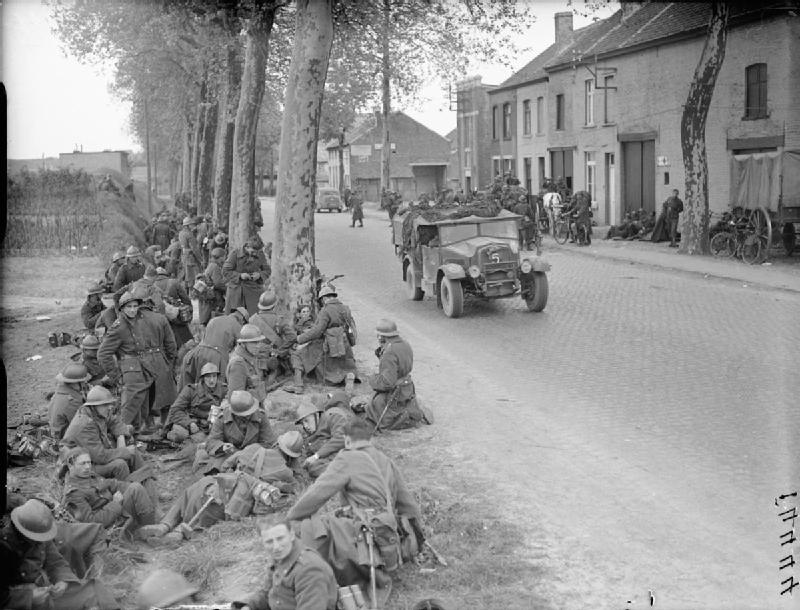
Belgian soldiers resting at the roadside. You can see their uniforms: Antiquated Helmet, and classic uniform

The Infantry Regiments were divided among 18 Infantry Divisions, two Cavalry Divisions, Several Corps, and Group Ninitte.

=== Field army ===
Most of these regiments saw combat in World War I, and were split to form other regiments. These regiments were well equipped as they were the first to enter combat.

==== Line regiments ====
1st Line Regiment (3rd Infantry Division), under Colonel Louis Barthélemy

2nd Line Regiment (12th Infantry Division), under Colonel Devloo

3rd Line Regiment (1st Infantry Division), under Captain Victor Defonseca

4th Line Regiment (1st Infantry Division), under Colonel Arthur De Cae

5th Line Regiment (2nd Infantry Division), under Colonel R. Carion

6th Line Regiment (2nd Infantry Division), under Colonel H. Godeau

7th Line Regiment (4th Infantry Division), under Colonel M. Gondry

8th Line Regiment (9th Infantry Division), under Colonel V. Vermeulen

9th Line Regiment (6th Infantry Division), under Colonel A. Bouha

10th Line Regiment (Formed the Ardennes Hunters)

11th Line Regiment (4th Infantry Division), under Colonel Louis Horckmans

12th Line Regiment (3rd Infantry Division), under Colonel Yvan Gerard

13th Line Regiment (8th Infantry Division), under Colonel Adrian Labio

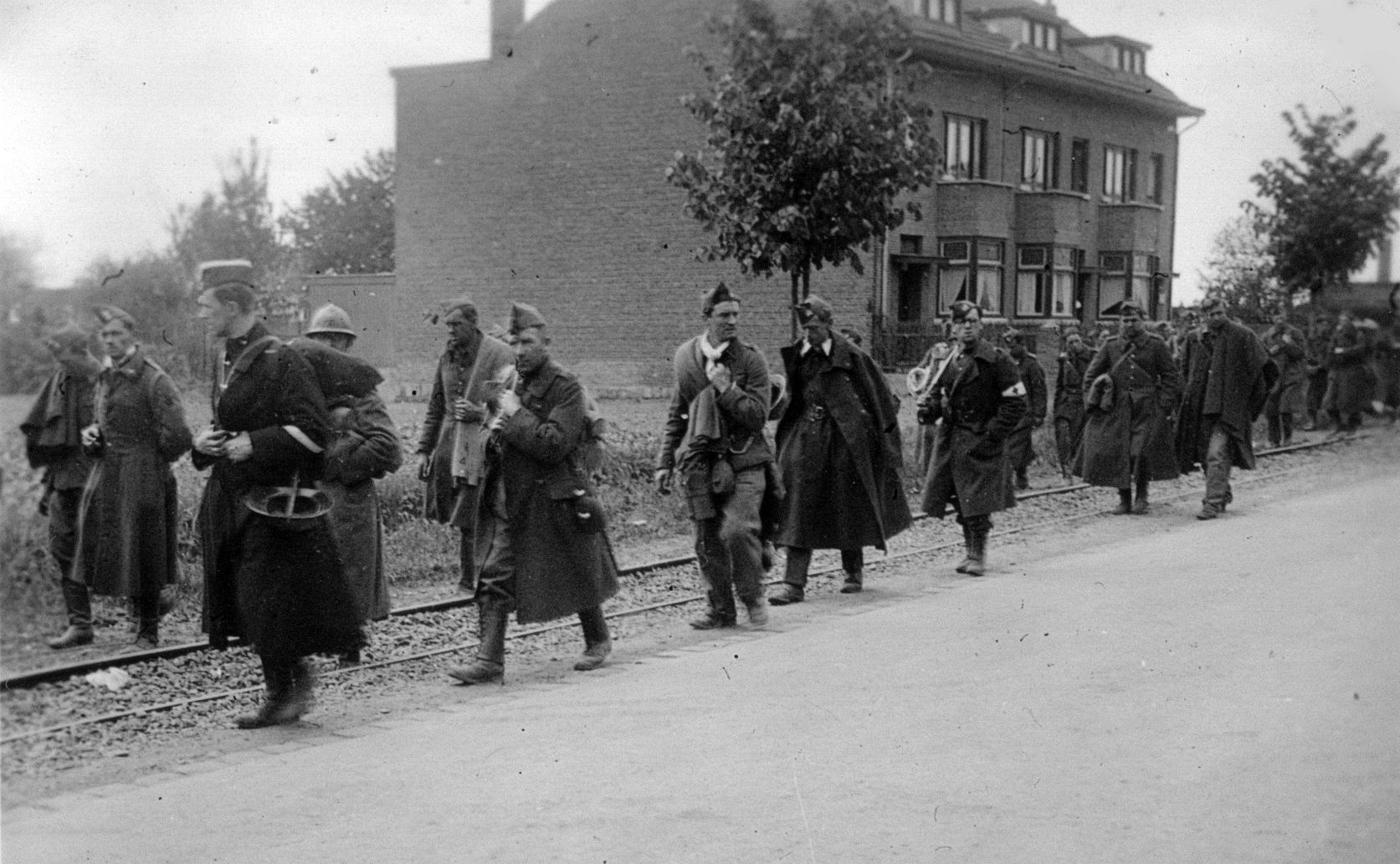
Another uniform for Belgian soldiers: A distinct beret, but otherwise, same uniform. This variant is more likely used by specialist units.

14th Line Regiment (11th Infantry Division), under Colonel E. Hennequin

==== Foot hunters ====
The foot hunters are a variant for a ‘Jager’ regiment.

1st Regiment Foot Hunters (5th Infantry Division), under Colonel L. Dagois

2nd Regiment Foot Hunters (5th Infantry Division), under Colonel Georges Lescornez

3rd Regiment Foot Hunters (10th Infantry Division), under Colonel A. Sthouse

==== Grenadiers and carabiners ====
Grenadiers, like all other armies in the world, consist of strong forces in the army. Carabiners fight quick skirmishes with the enemy to allow regular infantry to join the front. Carabiner-Cyclists also have cycles to increase mobility, allowing them to cooperate with cavalry, unlike most infantry. The Carabiner-Cyclists are also considered as cavalry.

1st Grenadier Regiment (6th Infantry Division), under Colonel André Van Sprang

1st Carabiner Regiment (6th Infantry Division), under Colonel, Robert Oor

1st Regiment Carabiner-Cyclists (Group Ninitte), under Colonel M. Flameng

2nd Regiment Carabiner-Cyclists, under Colonel Albert Mersch

==== Ardennes Hunters ====
The Ardennes Hunters were special forces in the Belgian Infantry. Created in 1934 by the reformation of the 10th Line Regiment, these regimental forces position themselves in the Ardennes, manning posts important junctions in the Ardennes region. In the Battle of Belgium, they slowed down the German onslaught, in time for the rest of the army to retreat to new positions.

1st Regiment Ardennes Hunters (1st Division Ardennes Hunters), under Colonel Robert Deschepper

2nd Regiment Ardennes Hunters (1st Division Ardennes Hunters), under Colonel Florent Merckx

3rd Regiment Ardennes Hunters (1st Division Ardennes Hunters), under Colonel H. Robert

=== Reserve units ===
==== First Reserve ====
The First Reserve was formed of young recruits in the 1930s. They consisted of regiments that were produced between early 1930 to late 1930. They have the same equipment as regiments in the Field Army.

===== Line regiments =====
15th Line Regiment (4th Infantry Division)

16th Line Regiment (9th Infantry Division)

17th Line Regiment (9th Infantry Division)

18th Line Regiment (7th Infantry Division)

19th Line Regiment (8th Infantry Division)

20th Line Regiment (11th Infantry Division)

21st Line Regiment (8th Infantry Division)

22nd Line Regiment (12th Infantry Division)

23rd Line Regiment (12th Infantry Division)

24th Line Regiment (1st Infantry Division)

25th Line Regiment (3rd Infantry Division)

26th Line Regiment (Was in 2nd Division in 1914, Non-existent in 1940)

27th Line Regiment (Was in 2nd Division in 1914, Non-existent in 1940)

28th Line Regiment (2nd Infantry Division)

29th Line Regiment (11th Infantry Division)

===== Foot hunters =====
4th Regiment Foot Hunters (5th Infantry Division)

5th Regiment Foot Hunters (10th Infantry Division)

6th Regiment Foot Hunters (10th Infantry Division)

===== Grenadiers and carabiners =====
2nd Grenadier Regiment (7th Infantry Division)

2nd Carabiner Regiment (7th Infantry Division)

3rd Regiment Carabiner-Cyclists (1st Cavalry Division)

4th Regiment Carabiner-Cyclists (1st Cavalry Division)

===== Ardennes Hunters =====
4th Regiment Ardennes Hunters (2nd Division Ardennes Hunters)

5th Regiment Ardennes Hunters (2nd Division Ardennes Hunters)

6th Regiment Ardennes Hunters (2nd Division Ardennes Hunters)

Ardennes Jagers Motorized Battalion

T13 Company at Namur

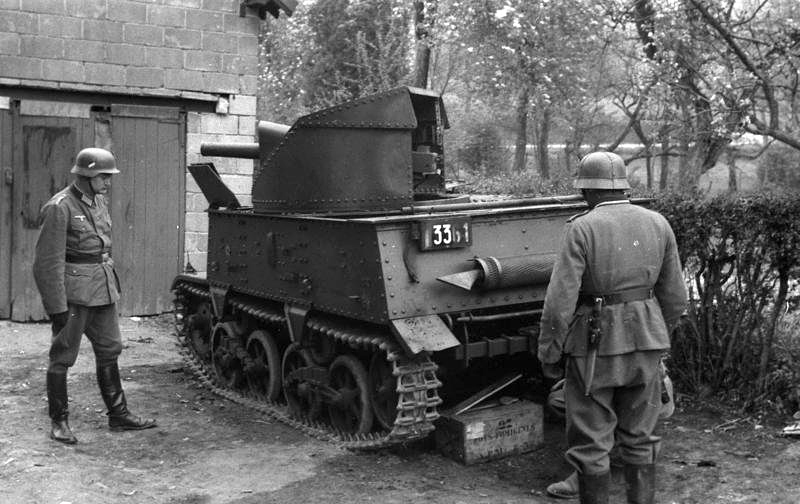
German soldiers inspect an abandoned Belgian T-13 tank destroyer

==== Second Reserve ====
The Second Reserve composed of conscripts that just joined in late 1939. These newer regiments were poorly equipped, their weaponry dated back to the early 1900s. Additionally, each regiment in the Second Reserve was smaller than their First Reserve counterparts, lacking a Fourth Battalion. A lack of heavy weapons plagued the Second Reserve for the duration of the Battle of Belgium.

===== Line regiments =====
31st Line Regiment (15th Infantry Division)

32nd Line Regiment (13th Infantry Division)

33rd Line Regiment (13th Infantry Division)

34th Line Regiment (13th Infantry Division)

35th Line Regiment (14th Infantry Division)

36th Line Regiment (14th Infantry Division)

37th Line Regiment (16th Infantry Division & Maritime Base)

38th Line Regiment (14th Infantry Division)

39th Line Regiment (18th Infantry Division)

40th Line Regiment (Non-existent)

41st Line Regiment (16th Infantry Division)

42nd Line Regiment (15th Infantry Division)

43rd Line Regiment (15th Infantry Division)

44th Line Regiment (16th Infantry Division)

===== Foot hunters =====
7th Regiment Foot Hunters (17th Infantry Division)

8th Regiment Foot Hunters (17th Infantry Division)

9th Regiment Foot Hunters (17th Infantry Division)

===== Grenadiers and carabiners =====
3rd Grenadier Regiment (18th Infantry Division)

3rd Carabiner Regiment (18th Infantry Division)

=== Reinforcements ===
Each regiment in the Field Army also made an additional reinforcing regiment to support operations. These regiments also acted as training forces.

==== Line regiments ====
51st Line Regiment

52nd Line Regiment

53rd Line Regiment

54th Line Regiment

55th Line Regiment

56th Line Regiment

57th Line Regiment

58th Line Regiment

59th Line Regiment

60th Line Regiment (Non-existent)

61st Line Regiment

62nd Line Regiment

63rd Line Regiment

64th Line Regiment

==== Foot hunters ====
10th Regiment Foot Hunters

11th Regiment Foot Hunters

12th Regiment Foot Hunters

==== Grenadiers and carabiners ====
4th Grenadier Regiment

4th Carabiner Regiment

5th Regiment Carabiner-Cyclists

==== Ardennes hunters ====
7th Regiment Ardennes Hunters

2nd Motorized Battalion (Ardennes Hunters)

Reinforcement and Training Center (Ardennes Hunters)

4th Army Depot

==== Fortress units ====
These units hold major junctions and forts along the front and consist of old veterans:

1st Regiment of Special Fortress Units

VI Special Fortress Unit Battalion

VII Special Fortress Unit Battalion

== Cavalry 1940 ==
Units considered to be ‘cavalry’ are a mix of Lancers, carabiners, Guides, Cyclists, and Armor. They act in support of Infantry and Artillery. Most of the regiments of the cavalry are motorized in the early 1930s.

=== Field units ===
1st Guides/Gidsen Regiment (1st Cavalry Division)

1st Lancers Regiment (2nd Cavalry Division)

2nd Lancers Regiment (1st Cavalry Division)

3rd Lancers Regiment (1st Cavalry Division)

1st Horseback Regiment (2nd Cavalry Division), also known as 1st Regiment Jagers op Paard, and 1st Chasseurs Regiment

2nd Horseback Regiment, also known as 2nd Regiment Jagers op Paard, and 2nd Chasseurs Regiment

1st Regiment Carabiner-Cyclists (1st Cavalry Division, transferred to Group Ninitte)

2nd Regiment Carabiner-Cyclists (2nd Cavalry Division)

=== Reserve units ===
==== First reserve ====
2nd Guides/Gidsen Regiment (Group Ninitte)

4th Lancers Regiment

T13 Battalion (2nd Cavalry Division)

Eskadron Armored Cars (2nd Cavalry Division)

Cyclist Squadron of 1st Infantry Division (Group Ninitte)

Cyclist Squadron of 2nd Infantry Division

Cyclist Squadron of 3rd Infantry Division

Cyclist Squadron of 4th Infantry Division

Cyclist Squadron of 5th Infantry Division

Cyclist Squadron of 6th Infantry Division

Cyclist Squadron of 7th Infantry Division

Cyclist Squadron of 8th Infantry Division

Cyclist Squadron of 9th Infantry Division

Cyclist Squadron of 10th Infantry Division

Cyclist Squadron of 11th Infantry Division

Cyclist Squadron of 12th Infantry Division

3rd Regiment Carabiner-Cyclists (1st Cavalry Division)

4th Regiment Carabiner-Cyclists (2nd Cavalry Division)

==== Second reserve ====
Cyclist Squadron of 13th Infantry Division

Cyclist Squadron of 14th Infantry Division (Group Ninitte)

Cyclist Squadron of 15th Infantry Division

Cyclist Squadron of 16th Infantry Division

Cyclist Squadron of 17th Infantry Division

Cyclist Squadron of 18th Infantry Division

=== Reinforcements ===
5th Regiment Carabiner-Cyclists (Cavalry Corps)

7th Motorized Regiment

== Border cyclists 1940 ==
These are emergency mobile units at the border. But the Border Cyclists recruitment effort has been limited, and there were few units.

1st Border Cyclists Regiment

2nd Border Cyclists Regiment

Border Cyclists Battalion of Limburg

Border Cyclists Battalion

T13 Company (Border Cyclists)

== Belgian Air Force 1940 ==
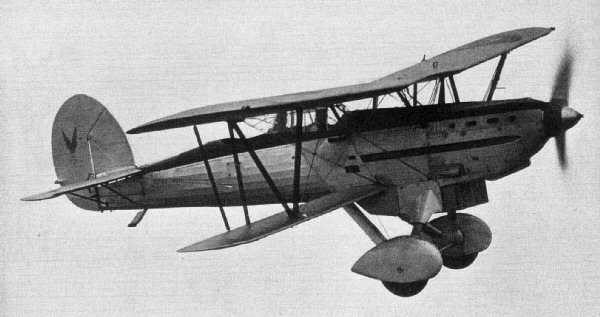
A Fairey Fox plane of the Belgian Air Force

The Belgian Air Force consists of three main regiments, with aircraft that was bought from the Allies.

1st Aviation Regiment, also known as 1st Air Regiment

2nd Aviation Regiment, also known as 2nd Air Regiment

3rd Aviation Regiment, also known as 3rd Air Regiment

Air Force Auxiliaries Regiment

== Gendarmerie 1940 ==
The Gendarmerie were police units that are standard in almost every country. For Belgium, in 1940, Gendarmerie volunteers joined the army for reconnaissance.

1st Light Regiment

2nd Light Regiment

Territorial Gendarmerie

== Army Health Service 1940 ==
There are classes of medical units in the Belgian Army of 1940. There are 6 “pillars” that describe a medical unit based on its strategic importance and size. This list shows the medical corps of the Belgian Army.

=== 1st Medical Corps (Reserve) ===
(2x) Medical Company

(2x) Army Ambulance

(3x) Light Surgery Ambulance

(1x) Heavy Surgery Ambulance

(2x) Medical Ambulance

(1x) ‘Hygiene Train’

(2x) Ambulance Vehicle Train

=== 2nd Medical Corps (Reserve) ===
(2x) Medical Company

(2x) Army Ambulance

(3x) Light Surgery Ambulance

(1x) Heavy Surgery Ambulance

(2x) Medical Ambulance

(1x) Hygiene Train

(2x) Ambulance Vehicle Train

=== 3rd Medical Corps (In active service) ===
(2x) Medical Company

1st Army Ambulance (VII Corps)

2nd Army Ambulance

1st Light Surgical Ambulance (VII Corps)

2nd Light Surgical Ambulance (Cavalry Corps)

3rd Light Surgical Ambulance

(1x) Heavy Surgery Ambulance

1st Medical Ambulance

2nd Medical Ambulance (Cavalry Corps)

Hygiene Train (VII Corps)

(2x) Ambulance Vehicle Train

=== Transport Corps ===
(3x) Company

== Artillery 1940 ==
This is a list of artillery regiments in the Belgian Army of 1940.

=== Field artillery ===
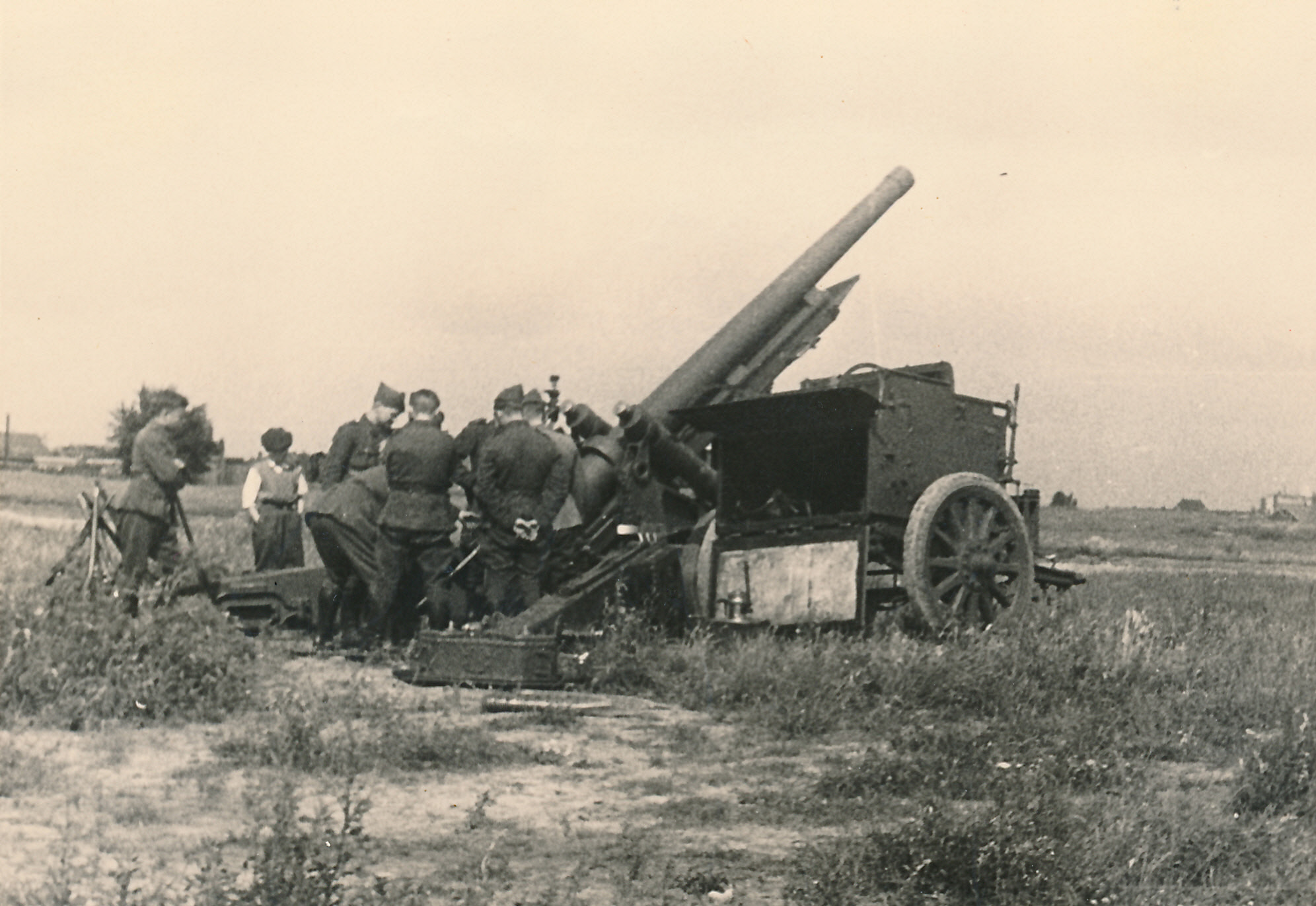
One Canon de 120mm L mle 1931 of 6th Artillery Regiment, April 1940.

These artillery regiments are part of the active army, and are placed in divisional command.

1st Artillery Regiment (1st Infantry Division)

2nd Artillery Regiment (2nd Infantry Division)

3rd Artillery Regiment (3rd Infantry Division)

4th Artillery Regiment (4th Infantry Division)

5th Artillery Regiment (5th Infantry Division)

6th Artillery Regiment (6th Infantry Division)

7th Artillery Regiment (7th Infantry Division, transferred to 12th Infantry Division)

8th Artillery Regiment (8th Infantry Division)

9th Artillery Regiment (9th Infantry Division)

10th Artillery Regiment (10th Infantry Division)

11th Artillery Regiment (11th Infantry Division)

12th Artillery Regiment (Split between 2nd Division Ardennes Hunters and IV Corps)

13th Artillery Regiment (IV Corps)

14th Artillery Regiment (Split between I Corps and II Corps)

15th Artillery Regiment (III Corps)

16th Artillery Regiment (II Corps)

17th Artillery Regiment (Split between 1st Cavalry Division and 18th Infantry Division)

18th Artillery Regiment (2nd Cavalry Division)

19th Artillery Regiment (Split between Cavalry Corps and Group Ninitte)

20th Artillery Regiment (7th Infantry Division)

21st Artillery Regiment (13th Infantry Division)

22nd Artillery Regiment (14th Infantry Division)

23rd Artillery Regiment (15th Infantry Division)

24th Artillery Regiment (16th Infantry Division)

25th Artillery Regiment (17th Infantry Division)

26th Artillery Regiment (13th Infantry Division)

VII Corps Artillery Group

=== Heavy army artillery ===
Army artillery regiments form heavy artillery support for the active army, but are not as mobile as the field artillery regiments. They are mostly divided between multiple units.

General Staff of Army Artillery

1st Army Artillery Regiment (General Staff of Army Artillery)

2nd Army Artillery Regiment (Split between 9th Infantry Division, 6th Infantry Division, General Staff of Army Artillery and II Corps)

3rd Army Artillery Regiment (Split between General Staff of Army Artillery and V Corps)

4th Army Artillery Regiment (Split between VII Corps, 6th Infantry Division, 17th Infantry Division, 9th Infantry Division, and 13th Infantry Division)

5th Army Artillery Regiment (Split between General Staff of Army Artillery, General Staff of the Army, Maritime Base, and VII Corps)

=== Anti-aircraft artillery ===
Anti-aircraft defense was very rare in the Belgian army of the early 1900s. The artillery was mostly bought, and there were only two units, plus a general staff.

General staff of Ground Defense against Air targets

1st Regiment Ground Defense against Air targets (1GrVLu)

2nd Regiment Ground Defense against Air targets (2GrVLu)

=== Fortress artillery ===
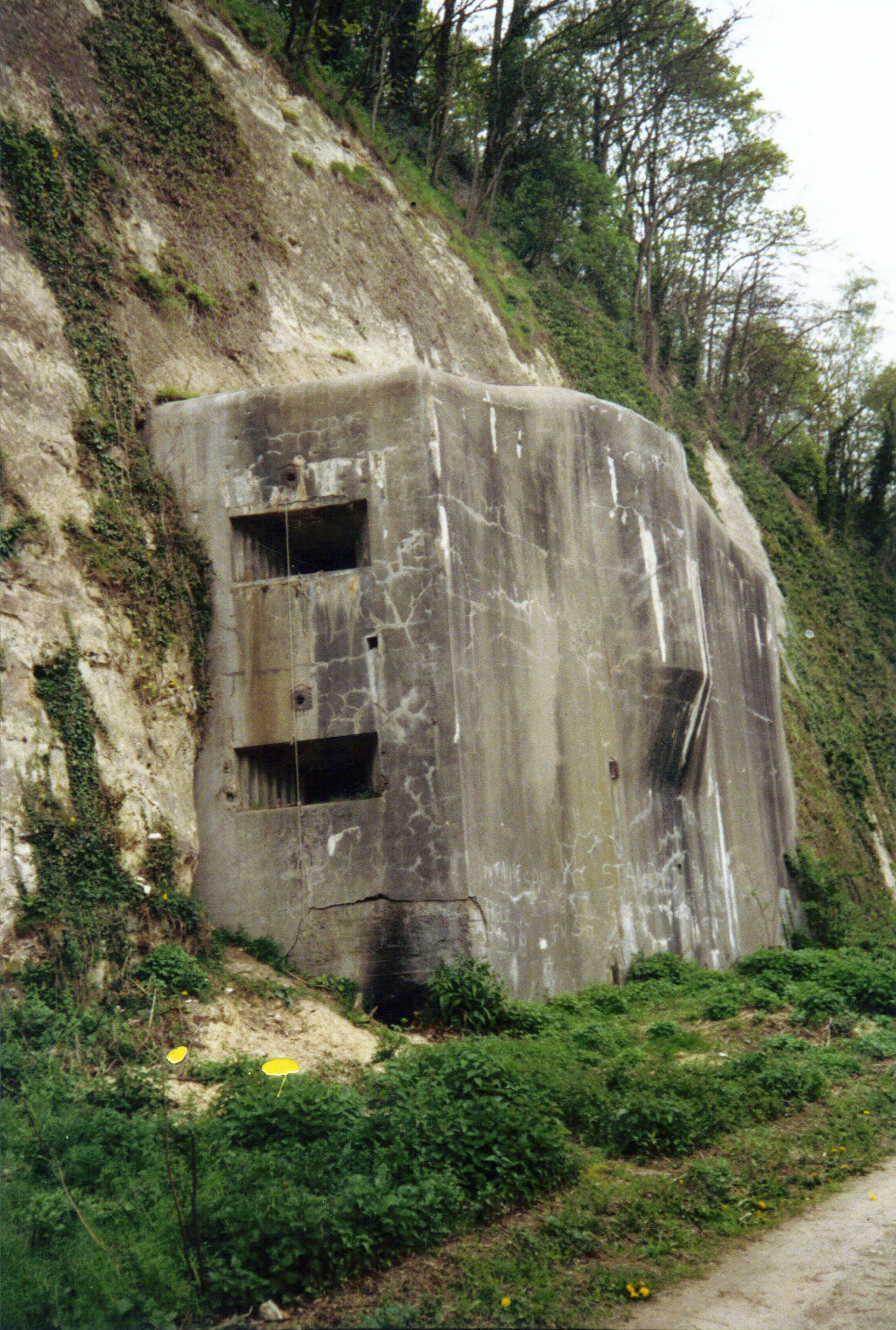
Fort Eben-Emael

Fortress Artillery are named for artillery that support Garrison sized forces in junctions and cities all around Belgium. There are 8 groups in total, 5 were part of a regiment.

Fortress Regiment of Liege (The main force is stationed at Liege against the Germans while smaller groups were positioned along the front, part of III Corps)

- Group I (Stationed at Eben-Emael, and part of the Fortress Regiment of Liege)
- Group II (Stationed at the Forts of Aubin-Neufchâteau, Pontisse, and De Barchon, and part of the Fortress Regiment of Liege)
- Group III (Stationed at the Forts of Evegnée, and Fléron, and part of the Fortress Regiment of Liege)
- Group IV (The largest Group, and stationed at the Forts of Chaudfontaine, Embourg, Boncelles, Tancrémont, and Flémalle, part of the Fortress Regiment of Liege)
- Group V (Stationed at the Fort of Battice, and part of the Fortress Regiment of Liege)
- Fortress Regiment of Namur (Stationed at Namur against the Germans, and was part of its defense)
- Group Defense of the Lower Scheldt (Part of 1st Army Artillery Regiment and was tasked with defending the lower Scheldt Canal)

=== Reinforcements ===
The reinforcing artillery are made up of all classes, and reinforce sectors as independent regiments.

31st Artillery Regiment

32nd Artillery Regiment

33rd Artillery Regiment

34th Artillery Regiment

6th Army Artillery Regiment

3rd Regiment Ground Defense against Air targets (3GrVLu)

== Engineers 1940 ==
In World War I, Belgium had only three engineer regiments. But in the mobilization process, the engineer regiments duplicated wildly, and by the time 1940 began, there were 26 engineer battalions and supporting units. The battalions were split among the divisions and corps.

=== Engineer battalions ===
1st Engineer Battalion (1st Infantry Division)

2nd Engineer Battalion (2nd Infantry Division)

3rd Engineer Battalion (3rd Infantry Division)

4th Engineer Battalion (4th Infantry Division)

5th Engineer Battalion (5th Infantry Division)

6th Engineer Battalion (7th Infantry Division)

7th Engineer Battalion (6th Infantry Division)

8th Engineer Battalion (10th Infantry Division)

9th Engineer Battalion (9th Infantry Division)

10th Engineer Battalion (8th Infantry Division)

11th Engineer Battalion (III Corps)

12th Engineer Battalion (VI Corps)

13th Engineer Battalion (14th Infantry Division)

14th Engineer Battalion (13th Infantry Division)

15th Engineer Battalion (18th Infantry Division)

16th Engineer Battalion (15th Infantry Division)

17th Engineer Battalion (17th Infantry Division)

18th Engineer Battalion (IV Corps)

19th Engineer Battalion (Split between 1st and 2nd Division Ardennes Hunters)

20th Engineer Battalion (Cavalry Corps)

21st Engineer Battalion (I Corps)

22nd Engineer Battalion (IV Corps)

23rd Engineer Battalion (III Corps)

24th Engineer Battalion (II Corps)

25th Engineer Battalion (1st Cavalry Division)

26th Engineer Battalion (2nd Cavalry Division)

Engineer Company (VII Corps)

=== Auxiliary units ===
1st Group of Auxiliaries

2nd Group of Auxiliaries

=== Reinforcements ===
40th Engineer Regiment

4th Battalion of Railway Troops

5th Company Pontonniers and ‘Inland Skippers’

== Transmission troops 1940 ==
Transmission troops were units attached to most active units of the Belgian Army. Divisions either have a company of these units or a battalion. Notice how only units from the Second reserve gain only a company and units from the active army and the First reserve gain a full battalion.

=== Divisional troops ===
1st Battalion of Transmission Troops (1st Infantry Division)

2nd Battalion of Transmission Troops (2nd Infantry Division)

3rd Battalion of Transmission Troops (3rd Infantry Division)

4th Battalion of Transmission Troops (4th Infantry Division)

5th Battalion of Transmission Troops (5th Infantry Division)

6th Battalion of Transmission Troops (6th Infantry Division)

7th Battalion of Transmission Troops (7th Infantry Division)

8th Battalion of Transmission Troops (8th Infantry Division)

9th Battalion of Transmission Troops (9th Infantry Division)

10th Battalion of Transmission Troops (10th Infantry Division)

11th Battalion of Transmission Troops (11th Infantry Division)

12th Battalion of Transmission Troops (12th Infantry Division)

13th Company of Transmission Troops (13th Infantry Division)

14th Company of Transmission Troops (14th Infantry Division)

15th Company of Transmission Troops (15th Infantry Division)

16th Company of Transmission Troops (16th Infantry Division)

17th Company of Transmission Troops (17th Infantry Division)

18th Company of Transmission Troops (18th Infantry Division)

19th Company of Transmission Troops (1st Division Ardennes Hunters)

20th Company of Transmission Troops (2nd Division Ardennes Hunters)

28th Battalion of Transmission Troops (1st Cavalry Division)

29th Battalion of Transmission Troops (2nd Cavalry Division)

=== Under corp command/under reserve ===
21st Battalion of Transmission Troops (I Corps)

22nd Battalion of Transmission Troops (II Corps)

23rd Battalion of Transmission Troops (III Corps)

24th Battalion of Transmission Troops (IV Corps)

25th Company of Transmission Troops (V Corps)

26th Company of Transmission Troops (VI Corps)

27th Company of Transmission Troops (VII Corps)

30th Battalion of Transmission Troops (Cavalry Corps)

=== Others ===
31st Battalion of Transmission Troops

Regiment of Army Transmission Troops

40th Battalion of Transmission Troops

== Free Belgian forces (1940-1945) ==
Independent Belgian forces evaded German disbanding following Belgian surrender. They would resist the Germans for the remainder of the war. Most were based in the UK, but some colonial forces were based in the Belgian Congo.

=== Ground forces ===
Piron Brigade

No. 10 (Inter Allied) Commando unit

5th Special Air Service

Public Force (Belgian Congo)

- 1st Groupement
- 2nd Groupement
- 3rd Groupement
- 2nd Infantry Battalion
- 3rd Infantry Battalion
- 5th Infantry Battalion
- 6th Infantry Battalion
- 8th Infantry Battalion
- 11th Infantry Battalion
- 12th Infantry Battalion
- 13th Infantry Battalion
- 4th Gendarmerie Battalion
- 7th Gendarmerie Battalion
- 9th Gendarmerie Battalion
- 10th Gendarmerie Battalion
- 15th Gendarmerie Battalion
- 16th Gendarmerie Battalion
- 1st Battalion de Garde

There were more reconnaissance units and detached Gendarmerie companies and platoons.

=== Air squadrons ===
350th Squadron

349th Squadron

=== Belgian Navy in-exile ===
The Belgian Marine Corp/Navy was dismantled following the surrender. Yet, many officers escaped to England and joined the Royal Navy.

== See also ==
- Battle of Belgium order of battle shows the divisions and corps of the Belgian Army for the Battle of Belgium
- Belgian Army order of battle shows the divisions and regiments of the Belgian army in 1914
