= 11th Infantry Division (Belgium) =

- Active: 1940
- Disbanded: 28 May 1940
- Country: Belgium
- Branch: Belgian Army
- Type: Infantry Division
- Role: Infantry
- Size: Division
- Part of: General Reserve
- Garrison/HQ: Leopoldsburg
- Engagements: Battle of Belgium (World War II)

The 11th Infantry Division (Dutch:11de Infanterie Divisie) was an Infantry Division of the Belgian Army that fought in the Battle of Belgium against the German Armed Forces.

== World War II ==
As a part of the first reserve, the 11th Infantry Division was a modernized Division of the Belgian Army. When mobilization was announced, the 11th Infantry Division gained extra support from the 14th Line Regiment, which had been transferred from the 4th Infantry Division.

11th Infantry Division became a general reserve of the Army. Leaving the organic III Corp, the 11th Infantry Division arrives at Berverlo Camp, where they will be stationed when the German attack begins.

The Beverlo Camp is north of the Albert canal, therefore, in front of the defensive perimeter, and in threat of attack by the ensuing German forces. Immediately starting the evacuation, with a small rearguard to delay the German attack, the 11th Infantry Division made its way to the Albert Canal.

The 11th Infantry Division was positioned at Diest, regrouping, when orders were given to go to the K-W line. By May 12, the Division, with all of its men from Camp Berverlo, arrive at Sint-Katelijne-Waver and position themselves east, west, and south.

After the collapse of the Albert Canal, II Corp has both the 6th and the 11th Infantry Divisions at the K-W line with 9th Infantry Division as reserve. No skirmishes in 11th Infantry Divisions sector have been determined. The Germans however, used their artillery to do damage on the roads leading out of the K-W Line, possibly trying to take out the 11th Infantry Divisions retreat path.

The K-W line was starting to collapse as the French and British forces are starting to abandon the line. Without outside support, the Belgians also had to fall back. The 11th Infantry Division made its way to Kluizen of the Ghent-Terneuzen Canal, where they set up a new defense. The division is of II Corp, along with 13th Infantry Division. After a German attack on the 13th Infantry Division came close to breaking a regiment, the northern flank of the 11th Infantry Division was in a panic. The reserves of the 11th Infantry Division were taken, and deployed north.

After the Allied forces in Flanders have been encircled, things have gone from bad to worse in Belgium. The German pressure steadily increased. By May 23rd, the 11th Infantry Division was stationed at Leie. The 11th Division manage to repulse a German attack, but were pushed back.

The 11th Infantry Division now is responsible for retaining a connection between them and the 12th Infantry Division. The Germans make sure to breach the connection by attacking with full force. The 12th Infantry Division respond by deploying their reserves to halt the attack south. An counterattack was launched.

By May 26, the full strength of the German Army manage to make several large infiltrations in the Leie Diversion Canal. A breach was made again and this time, the 12th Infantry Division was battered trying to defend the line. The 11th Infantry Division had to send in its last reserve.

The Germans outmaneuver the 11th Infantry Division, and after a last ditch defense of the Leie Diversion Canal, retreat towards Ursel, where resistance evaporates.

== Structure 1940 ==
Structure of division at eve of the Battle of Belgium:

- Headquarters: Beverloo Camp, Leopoldsburg
- Commanding Officer: Major General Ivan Lebert
- 14th Line Regiment
- 20th Line Regiment
- 29th Line Regiment
- 9th Artillery Regiment
- 11th Engineer Battalion
- 11th Battalion of Transmission Troops
- Cyclist Squadron 11ID (to the 11th Infantry Division)

== See also ==
- Battle of Belgium order of battle
- 16th Infantry Division
