= Battle of Belgium order of battle =

This is the order of battle for the Battle of Belgium, a World War II battle between German and Allied forces in Belgium on 10–28 May 1940.

== Allied armed forces ==
=== Belgian air service ===
The Belgian Air Service (Aéronautique Militaire Belge) comprised three main aerial regiments:

- 1^{er} Régiment d'Aéronautique (1st Air Regiment - Observation and Army Cooperation aircraft)
  - 1^{er} Groupe (Fairey Fox)
  - 2^{e} Groupe (Fairey Fox)
  - 3^{e} Groupe (Fairey Fox)
  - 4^{e} Groupe (Fairey Fox)
  - 5^{e} Groupe (Renard R.31)
  - 6^{e} Groupe (Renard R.31)
- 2^{e} Régiment d'Aéronautique (2nd Air Regiment - Fighter aircraft)
  - 1^{er} Groupe (Gloster Gladiator & Hawker Hurricane)
  - 2^{e} Groupe (Fiat CR.42)
  - 3^{e} Groupe (Fairey Fox)
- 3^{e} Régiment d'Aéronautique (3rd Air Regiment - Reconnaissance and Bomber aircraft)
  - 1^{er} Groupe (Fairey Fox)
  - 3^{e} Groupe (Fairey Battle & Fairey Fox)

The Aéronautique Militaire Belge was reinforced by the Royal Air Force:

- RAF Advanced Air Striking Force (Air Vice-Marshal P H L Playfair)
- No. 14 Group RAF (Group Captain P.F. Fullard)

=== Belgian Army ===
The strength of the Belgian Army extended to seven Corps, a Cavalry Corps and several ad hoc units and fortresses. In the following overview, the position of each division at the start of hostilities on May 10, 1940 is given in parentheses.

- I Corps - Lieutenant-General Alexis Vander Veken
  - 4th Infantry Division - Lieutenant-General René de Grave (Albert Canal: sector Diepenbeek-Eigenbilzen)
  - 7th Infantry Division - Major General Eugène Van Trooyen (Albert Canal: sector Eigenbilzen-Lixhe)
- II Corps - Lieutenant-General Victor Michem
  - 6th Infantry Division - Lieutenant-General Emile Janssens (Albert Canal: sector Eindhout-Beringen)
  - 9th Infantry Division - Lieutenant-General Richard Vander Hofstadt (Albert Canal: sector Herentals-Eindhout)
- III Corps - Lieutenant-General Joseph de Krahe
  - 2nd Infantry Division - Lieutenant-General Auguste Colpin (Fortified Position Luik: sector Chaudfontaine-Engis)
  - 3rd Infantry Division - Lieutenant-General Gaston Lozet (Fortified Position Luik: sector Chertal-Chaudfontaine)
- IV Corps - Lieutenant-General André Bogaerts
  - 12th Infantry Division - Major General Constant De Wulf (Fortified Position Antwerp: sector Sint Job-in't-Goor - Massenhoven)
  - 15th Infantry Division - Lieutenant-General Baron Raoul de Hennin de Boussu-Walcourt (Albert Canal: sector Massenhoven - Herentals)
  - 18th Infantry Division - Lieutenant-General Henri Six (Advance Position: sector Sint-Lenaerts - Dessel)
- V Corps - Lieutenant-General Edouard Van Den Bergen
  - 13th Infantry Division - Major General François Duthoy (Fortified Position Antwerp: sector Kapellen - Turnhout Canal)
  - 17th Infantry Division - Major General Raoul Daufresne de la Chevalerie (Fortified Position Antwerp: sector Berendrecht - Kapellen)
- VI Corps - Lieutenant-General Fernand Verstraeten
  - 5th Infantry Division - Lieutenant-General Maurice Spinette (Transversal position: sector Halle - Ninove)
  - 10th Infantry Division - Lieutenant-General Jules Pire (KW Line: sector Leuven)
- VII Corps - Lieutenant-General Georges Deffontaine
  - 8th Infantry Division - Major General André Lesaffre (Fortified Position Namur)
  - 2nd Division Chasseurs Ardennais - Major General François Ley (Meuse River: sector Engis - Andenne)
- Cavalry Corps - Lieutenant-General Knight Maximilien de Neve de Roden
  - 1st Infantry Division - Lieutenant-General Walter Coppens (Albert Canal: sector Hasselt)
  - 14th Infantry Division - Lieutenant-General Armand Massart (Albert Canal: sector Beringen - Stokrooie)
  - 2nd Cavalry Division - Major General Joseph Beernaert (Demer/Gete Position)
  - Group Ninitte - Major General Robert Ninitte (Advance Position: Dessel - Maasmechelen)
- Group K - Lieutenant-General Maurice Keyaerts
  - 1st Cavalry Division - Lieutenant-General Maurice Keyaerts (Advance Position Ardennes: Neufchateau)
  - 1st Division Chasseurs Ardennais - Major General Werner Goffinet (Advance Position Ardennes: Sint-Hubert)
- General Army Reserve
  - 11th Infantry Division - Major General Ivan Lebert (Camp Beverlo)
  - 16th Infantry Division - Lieutenant-General Georges Van Egroo (Ghent Bridgehead)

=== French First Army Group ===
==== 1st Army ====
- Cavalry Corps
  - 2nd Light Mechanized Division
  - 3rd Light Mechanized Division
- 3rd Corps
  - 1st Moroccan Infantry Division
  - 2nd North African Infantry Division
- 4th Corps
  - 32nd Infantry Division
- 5th Corps
  - 5th North African Infantry Division
  - 101st Infantry Division
- Belgian VII Corps
  - 2nd Chasseurs Ardennais
  - 8th Infantry Division

==== 2nd Army ====
- Direct reporting:
  - 2nd Light Cavalry Division
  - 5th Light Cavalry Division
  - 1st Cavalry Brigade
- 10th Corps
  - 3rd North African Infantry Division
  - 5th Light Cavalry Division
  - 55th Infantry Division
  - 71st Infantry Division
- 18th Corps
  - 1st Colonial Infantry Division
  - 41st Infantry Division

==== 7th Army ====
- Direct reporting:
  - 21st Infantry Division
  - 60th Infantry Division
  - 68th Infantry Division
- 1st Corps
  - 1st Light Mechanized Division
  - 25th Motorized Division
- 16th Corps
  - 9th Motorized Division

==== 9th Army ====
- Direct reporting:
  - 4th North African Infantry Division
  - 53rd Infantry Division
- 2nd Corps
  - 4th Light Cavalry Division
  - 5th Motorized Division
- 11th Corps
  - 1st Light Cavalry Division
  - 18th Infantry Division
  - 22nd Infantry Division
- 41st Corps
  - 61st Infantry Division
  - 102nd Fortress Division
  - 3rd Spahi Brigade

==== British Expeditionary Force ====
General Lord Gort

- Directly reporting:
  - 5th Infantry Division
  - 12th (Eastern) Infantry Division
  - 23rd (Northumbrian) Division
  - 46th Infantry Division
- I Corps - Lieutenant-General Michael Barker
  - 1st Infantry Division
  - 2nd Infantry Division
  - 48th (South Midland) Division
- II Corps - Lieutenant-General Alan Brooke
  - 3rd Infantry Division
  - 4th Infantry Division
  - 50th (Northumbrian) Infantry Division
- III Corps - Lieutenant-General Ronald Adam
  - 42nd (East Lancashire) Infantry Division
  - 44th (Home Counties) Division

== German armed forces ==
=== Army Group B ===
Commanded by Colonel General Fedor von Bock

- (Chief of Staff - Lt. Gen. Hans von Salmuth).
- Sixth Army —Colonel General Walter von Reichenau
  - (Chief of Staff - Maj. Gen. Friedrich Paulus).
  - IV Corps - Gen.of Infantry Viktor von Schwedler
    - 15th Infantry Division - Maj. Gen. Ernst-Eberhard Hell (reserve)
    - 205th Infantry Division - Lt. Gen. Ernst Richter
  - XI Corps- Lt. Gen. Joachim von Kortzfleisch
    - 7th Infantry Division - Maj. Gen. Eccard von Gablenz
    - 211th Infantry Division - Maj. Gen. Kurt Renner
    - 253rd Infantry Division - Lt.Gen. Fritz Kuhne
  - IX Corps
  - XVI Corps
    - 3rd Panzer Division
    - 4th Panzer Division
  - XXVII Corps
- Eighteenth Army — Georg von Küchler
  - Reserves
    - 208th Infantry Division
    - 225th Infantry Division
    - 526th Infantry Division
  - SS "Verfügungstruppe" Division
  - 7th Airborne Division
  - 22nd Air Landing Infantry Division
  - 9th Panzer Division
  - 207th Infantry Division
  - X Corps
    - SS "Adolf Hitler" Division
    - 227th Infantry Division
    - 1st Cavalry Division
  - XXVI Corps
    - 256th Infantry Division
    - 254th Infantry Division
    - SS "Der Führer" Division

=== Luftwaffe ===
The Luftwaffe order of battle for operations over Belgium:

- IV. Fliegerkorps (General der Flieger, Generaloberst Alfred Keller)
  - Lehrgeschwader 1 (Stab. I., II., III., IV. Düsseldorf)
  - Kampfgeschwader 30 (Stab. I., II., at Oldenburg III. at Marx)
  - Kampfgeschwader 27 (III. at Wunstorf)
- Jagdfliegerführer 2 (Oberst Kurt-Bertram von Döring)
  - Jagdgeschwader 26 (Stab., II at Dortmund, III. at Essen-Mühlheim)
  - Jagdgeschwader 3 (III. at Hopsten)
  - Jagdgeschwader 51 (Stab. at Bönninghardt, I. at Krefeld)
  - Jagdgeschwader 27 (II. Bönninghardt)
  - Jagdgeschwader 20 (I. at Bönninghardt)
- VIII. Fliegerkorps (Generalmajor Wolfram von Richthofen)
  - Jagdgeschwader 27 (Stab., I.)
  - Jagdgeschwader 21
  - Jagdgeschwader 1 (I.)
  - Sturzkampfgeschwader 76 (I.)
  - Sturzkampfgeschwader 2 (Stab., I., III.)
  - Sturzkampfgeschwader 77 (Stab., I, II.)
  - Lehrgeschwader 1 (IV(St.))
  - Lehrgeschwader 2 II.(Shl)
  - Kampfgeschwader 77 (Stab., I., II., III.)
