= 17th Infantry Division (Belgium) =

- 17 ème Infanteriedivisie
- Active: 25 August 1939 - 28 May 1940
- Country: Belgium
- Branch: Belgian Land Component
- Type: Infantry Division
- Role: Infantry
- Size: Division
- Part of: V Corps
- Garrison/HQ: Ekeren
- Engagements: Second World War; Battle of Belgium

Commanders
- Notable commanders: General Major, Raoul Daufresne de la Chevalerie

The 17th Infantry Division (Dutch: 17 ème Infanteriedivisie) was an Infantry Division of the Belgian Army that fought in the Battle of Belgium during the Second World War.

== History ==
=== Second World War ===
As part of the second reserve, the 17th Infantry Division, like its counterparts, were armed with antiquated weaponry from World War I and was from the older reserve classes. Deployed in the fortified positions of Antwerp along with the 13th Infantry Division, the 17th Infantry Division was part of the defense of the Scheldt Canal.

In the event of the German attack, the 17th Infantry Division fortified Antwerp. The surrounding countryside was turned into a firing field as the crops were mown down, and the grass was scattered. But north of Antwerp, the Germans advanced steadily, taking a heavy toll on their French counterparts. Retreating from the frontier, the scattered French managed to arrive at Antwerp, then continued a headlong retreat,

But now with the front weakening, the Germans advanced at a rapid pace, now with its intentions clear. They are hoping to threaten the flanks of Antwerp and coordinate an encirclement. The 17th Infantry Division took minor casualties, as fighting in Antwerp was relatively quiet.

After the capitulation of the Netherlands, the entire northern front came under attack. The Germans managed to gain a few provinces north of Antwerp. The K-W line south was overrun and threatened the flanks. Antwerp had to be abandoned. The 17th Infantry Division was sent to the Ghent–Terneuzen Canal to be part of its defense. They were deployed in the centre.

After the allied forces in Flanders and Northern France have been encircled, the situation in Belgium was going from bad to worse. The line had been breached as the 17th Infantry Division was ordered to retreat back to a new defense of the Leie Diversion Canal.

The 17th Infantry Division regrouped, joining with the 6th Infantry Division, and occupy the area near Strobugge. The canal defense of Leie was reorganized, with the 17th Infantry Division receiving the II and III battalions of the 39th Line Regiment.

A German attack on the 17th Infantry Division breaks through, and the division falls back to Male. The command orders that Infantry Divisions make no further contact with the enemy if possible, with the enemy slowed down by motorized units and artillery.

The situation has gotten into a really desperate stage by this point, and soon, surrender was declared official.

== Structure ==
On the eve of the Battle of Belgium, the division's structure was as follows:

- 17th Infantry Division
  - Divisional Headquarters
  - 7th Foot Hunter Regiment
    - Regimental Headquarters
    - Staff Company
    - Medical Company
    - Scout Platoon
  - 8th Foot Hunter Regiment
    - Regimental Headquarters
    - Staff Company
    - Medical Company
    - Scout Platoon
  - 9th Foot Hunter Regiment
    - Regimental Headquarters
    - Staff Company
    - Medical Company
    - Scout Platoon
  - 25th Artillery Regiment
    - Regimental Headquarters
    - Staff Battery
    - 1st Artillery Battalion
    - 2nd Artillery Battalion
- 17th Signals Battalion
- 17th Engineer Battalion

== See also ==
- Army Group B
- 13th Infantry Division
- 2nd Cavalry Division
- K-W line
