= 8th Infantry Division (Belgium) =

- 8 ème Infanteriedivisie
- Active: 25 August 1939 - 28 May 1940
- Country: Belgium
- Branch: Belgian Land Component
- Type: Infantry Division
- Role: Infantry
- Size: Division
- Part of: VII Corps
- Garrison/HQ: Namur
- Engagements: Second World War; Battle of Belgium

Commanders
- Notable commanders: Major General, André Lesaffre

The 8th Infantry Division (Dutch: 8 ème Infanteriedivisie) was an Infantry Division of the Belgian Army that fought in the Battle of Belgium during the Second World War.

== History ==
=== Second World War ===
As part of VII Corps, the 8th Infantry Division was part of the defense of the Meuse between Englis and the Ardennes. It also supported the strategic and fortified position of Namur.(VPN)

At the beginning of the battle, the III battalion of the 19th Line Regiment was deployed to the nearby town of Grand Bois de Grandes Salles to possibly intervene with a German Parachute landing. The 13th line regiment was sent to occupy the forest of Tronquoi to discourage and prevent a possible German landing.

When the Ardennes had been withdrawn from, the 1st Company of the 2nd Battalion, and the 3rd Auxiliary regiment join the 8th Infantry Division and fortified the Meuse Meuse Sector. The 8th Infantry Division will become responsible for this sector.

After the collapse of Liège, the 8th Infantry Division's defense was heavily manned with the 2nd Division of the Ardennes Hunters, the French 1st Army, and the retreating forces of III Corps, which made the lines of position Namur extend north. The Germans didn't hesitate to attack and are advancing on a rapid pace. The 8th Infantry Division as to get every advantage it could get to withstand this sudden collapse in resistance.

By May 15, contact was broken for a while as the high command issue that Namur and the Meuse Meuse sector be abandoned. The plan is that by May 16, the entire Corp must be west of the Scheldt Canal. But they managed to arrive at the three villages they have to defend. (Oeselhem, Markegem, and Olsene.) In an agreement with the British, VII Corps shortened their lines so the British army can take up positions south.

But the German advance didn't halt and the 8th Infantry Division was sent to take up positions between the Leie Canal and the Upper Scheldt Canal. The 8th Infantry Division was also responsible for securing the southern Belgian frontier in case of a British withdrawal.

The situation went downhill as the Germans advanced and encircled the Allied forces in northern France and Flanders. The high command ordered that the 8th Infantry Division retreat but the Division retained its positions. The Germans breached the defenses but the 8th Infantry Division still managed to hold on. The division was ordered to stay intact and to the best of its abilities, retain a connecting line between them, and the 9th Infantry Division. It suffered heavy losses as Leie eventually had to be abandoned.

May 26–27 saw great chaos engulf the division as the reorganization was futile. The Germans are steadily closing on the large gap created from the last retreat. The 8th Infantry Division, after a doomed attempt to join with the main army, capitulated near Kortemark.

== Structure ==
On the eve of the Battle of Belgium, the division's structure was as follows:

- 8th Infantry Division
  - Divisional Headquarters
  - 13th Infantry Regiment
    - Regimental Headquarters
    - Staff Company
    - Medical Company
    - Scout Platoon
  - 19th Infantry Regiment
    - Regimental Headquarters
    - Staff Company
    - Medical Company
    - Scout Platoon
  - 21st Infantry Regiment
    - Regimental Headquarters
    - Staff Company
    - Medical Company
    - Scout Platoon
  - 5th Artillery Regiment
    - Regimental Headquarters
    - Staff Battery
    - 1st Artillery Battalion
    - 2nd Artillery Battalion
    - 3rd Artillery Battalion
    - 4th Artillery Battalion
- Armoured Anti-Tank Company
- 8th Signals Battalion
- 10th Engineer Battalion

== See also ==
- Battle of Belgium
- Battle of Belgium Order of battle(1940)
- German Elite Airborne Troops
- French 1st Army
- 9th Infantry Division
- 10th Infantry Division
- K-W line
