= 14th Infantry Division (Belgium) =

- Active: 1940
- Disbanded: 28 May 1940
- Country: Belgium
- Branch: Belgian Army
- Type: Infantry Division
- Role: Infantry
- Size: Division
- Part of: Cavalry Corps (Belgium)
- Garrison/HQ: Herk-de-Stad
- Engagements: Second World War; Battle of Belgium

The 14th Infantry Division (Dutch: 14de Infanterie Divisie) was an infantry division of the Belgian Army that fought against the German armed forces in the Battle of Belgium.

== World War II ==
As a part of Second reserve, the 14th Infantry Division, like its counterparts, were armed with the outdated antiquated weaponry from World War I. As a result of an lack of antitank/aircraft equipment, the 14th Infantry Division had to count on 1st infantry Division for antitank support. Although the combat capabilities of the division were never in doubt, they could count on their reconnaissance cyclists unit, which was not withdrawn when the fighting begun, unlike most of the other infantry divisions.

Stationed on the Albert Canal, the 14th Infantry Division oversaw the destruction of the bridges over the canal, and later, were under continuous attack by the Germans. A breakthrough in the sector of the Albert Canal manned by the 7th Infantry Division caused the entire front to fall back to the K-W line.

In contrast to many infantry divisions, which organized a planned retreat to the K-W line, the 14th Infantry Division engaged in an unorganized and slow retreat. The morale of the 14th Infantry Division was deterred, and discipline collapsed in the lines. With the Germans advance not showing a sign of stopping, the division was eventually encountered by the Germans and was reduced to remnants. Two regiments of the line were wiped out in the impending German onslaught, and the remainder were not in a condition to engage the Germans.

Confirmed as no longer deployable, the 14th Infantry Division was transferred to the coastal areas near Zeeland and undertook no further fighting against the Germans.

"The 14th Infantry Division only fought the Germans for six days before being forwarded to the coast, where they will be stationed until on May 28, when the division were disbanded following the surrender of Belgium."

== Structure 1940 ==
Structure of the division at the eve of the Battle of Belgium.

•Headquarters, at Herk-de-stad

•Commanding General, 14th Infantry Division -Lieutenant- General Armand Massart

°35th Line Regiment

°36th Line Regiment

°38th Line Regiment

°22nd Artillery Regiment

°13th Battalion Engineer

°14th Company of Transmission Troops

°Cyclist Group 14ID(to the 14th Infantry Division)

== See also ==
- Battle of Belgium
- Army Group B
- 1st Infantry Division
- 7th Infantry Division
- Zeelandic Flanders (the coastal area the 14th Infantry Division occupies until capitulation)
