= 5th Infantry Division (Belgium) =

- Active: 1914-1940
- Disbanded: 28 May 1940
- Country: Belgium
- Branch: Belgian Army
- Type: Infantry Division
- Role: Infantry
- Size: Division
- Part of: VI Corps (Belgium)
- Garrison/HQ: Vlezenbeek
- Engagements: First World War; Battle of the Yser; Hundred Days Offensive; Second World War; Battle of Belgium

Commanders
- Notable commanders: Louis Ruquoy; Cyriaque Gillain

The 5th Infantry Division (Dutch: 5de Infanterie Divisie) was an infantry division of the Belgian Army that fought during the First World War (1914-18) and against the German Armed Forces in the Battle of Belgium (1940).

== History ==
=== World War I ===
At the start of World War I, the 5th Infantry Division was classified as ‘5th Division’. The headquarters were located at Mons and the division was composed of the 1st, 16th, and 17th Mixed Brigades. They had additional Cavalry, with the 16th and 17th Mixed Brigades mainly composed of Chasseurs, with additional support from Divisional Cavalry.

Commanders of the Division were :

- Georges Alexandre Ruwet (August - September 1914)
- Georges Louis Guiette (September - October 1914)
- Leon Alphonse Scheere (October 1914 - January 1915)
- P. LeChat (January 1915 - June 1916),
- Louis Ruquoy (June 1916 - January 1917),
- Cyriaque Gillain (January 1917 - April 1918),
- Louis Ruquoy (April 1918 - 4 October 1919)

=== World War II ===
During peacetime, the 5th Infantry Division was part of Iste Army Corps with 6th Infantry Division. They are not the strongest Divisions in the Army, but certainly do have a reputation, having an organic artillery regiment (the 11th Artillery Regiment). 5th Infantry Division was handed over to VI Corps, who stationed them at sector Halle of the Albert Canal.

When the German attack was confirmed, the 5th Infantry Division arrive at the K-W line and reinforced the 10th Infantry Division which was just south of them. Although the Germans have not breached the Albert Canal, the high command is preparing for a retreat to the K-W line.

After the fall of Lèige, the 5th Infantry Divisions northern flank was secured by the 2nd Infantry Division which had been withdrawn from Liège.

Then the British Expeditionary Forces arrive and the 5th Infantry Division's flank becomes a position of confusion. The 10th Infantry Division was sent away and was replaced by British forces. Now, the 5th Infantry Division retains responsibility of keeping connection between the entire Belgian Army, and the Allied Armies.

After the abandonment of Demer/Gate, the German attack was now focused on the Leuven sector of the K-W line. After heavy bombardment, contact was made with the first German soldiers. The allies wavered, and eventually, the British and French armies abandoned the K-W line. Without Allied support, the Divisions of the Belgian Army also had to retreat.

On May 17, the 5th Infantry Division made its way to the Willebroek Canal. After a new line was established, the 5th Infantry Division was positioned in the village of Erpe, then, under VI Corps, made its way to the Semmerzake-Munte Sector.

Even after the Allied forces in Flanders were encircled, the Germans diverted their attention onto breaching the Northern defense. Although minor fighting was for the VI Corps, the 2nd Infantry Division had experienced an attack from the Germans and morale wavered. VI Corps sends the 5th Infantry Division south to strengthen defense.

Things deteriorated quickly. The 5th Infantry Division was sent to the Leie Diversion Canal and positioned itself near Nevele. The 4th Infantry Division south had the Germans overrun their defense. To counter, 5th Infantry Division built new defenses near Poesele.

By May 27, heavy fighting is taking place as pressure is already increasing. The 5th Infantry Division line was bending from what seems to be never ending German attacks. After a last ditch defense, the entire Belgian front fell back.

With the strength of the 5th Infantry Division reduced, the 5th Infantry Division surrendered with the main army on May 28.

== Structure 1940 ==
Structure of the division at the eve of the Battle of Belgium.

•Headquarters, at Vlesenbeek

•Commanding Officer, 5th Infantry Division -Lieutenant- General Maurice Spinette

- 1st Regiment of Hunters-on-Foot
- 2nd Regiment of Foot Hunters
- 4th Regiment of Hunters-on-Foot
- 11th Artillery Regiment (to the 5th Infantry Division)
- 5th Battalion Engineer
- 5th Battalion of Transmission Troops

°Cyclist Squadron 5ID (to the 5th Infantry Division)

== See also ==
- Battle of Belgium (Order of Battle)
- Army Group B
- 10th Infantry Division
- 2nd Infantry Division
- 4th Infantry Division
- British Expeditionary Force
- K-W line
