= Louis Ruquoy =

Belgian military commander

Lieutenant-General Louis Ruquoy
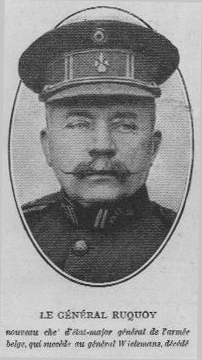
- Born: 3 November 1861; Frasnes-lez-Buissenal, Belgium
- Died: 1937 (aged 75–76); Braine-l'Alleud, Belgium
- Military career
- Allegiance: Belgium
- Branch: Belgian Land Component
- Service years: 1877–1918
- Rank: Lieutenant-General
- Commands: 5th Infantry Division (Belgium); Chief of Staff (1917–18)

Lieutenant-General baron Louis Ruquoy (or Louis Rucquoy) (French pronunciation: [lwi ʁykwa]; 3 November 1861 – 1937) was the Chief of Staff of the Belgian Army during the second part of the First World War.

== Career ==
Ruquoy entered the Belgian Army in 1877. By 1914 he was Lieutenant-Colonel and commander of the 3rd Regiment of chasseurs à pied. He was wounded twice in October 1914 during the evacuation of Antwerp. On June 11, 1915 he was promoted to Major-General and became commander of the Belgian 5th Division.

On 30 March 1916 he became Lieutenant-General and in January 1917 he succeeded Felix Wielemans as Chief of the General Staff. In April 1918, he was replaced by Cyriaque Gillain and became commander of the 5th Division again. He ended the war as commander of the Belgian occupation forces in the Rhineland.

After the war, he was made a Baron by King Albert I. His only son, Pierre, was killed in the trenches near Boezinge on 26 December 1916.

== Honours ==
- 1924 : Grand Cordon in the Order of Leopold.

Military offices
Preceded by Félix Wielemans	Chief of the General Staff of the Belgian Army; 6 January 1917 – 10 April 1918	Succeeded by Cyriaque Gillain
