= Henri Six =

Belgian fencer

Personal information
- Full name: Henri Émile Albert Joseph Six
- Born: 4 May 1877 Templeuve, Belgium
- Died: 4 November 1942 Ixelles, Belgium

Sport
- Sport: Fencing

Lieutenant-General Henri Six (born 4 May 1877 in Templeuve, died 4 November 1942 in Ixelles) was a Belgian Commander during WWII and olympic fencer. He competed in the individual sabre event at the 1908 Summer Olympics.

== Military career ==
=== Promotions ===
- 1927-03-26 Lieutenant-Colonel
- 1929-09-26 Colonel
- 1934-12-26 Major-General
- 1940-03-26 Lieutenant-General

=== Service ===
- 1930 - 1934 Aide-de-Camp to Prince Leopold
- 1934 – 1935 Aide-de-Camp to the King of Belgium
- 1935 – 1936 Commandant of the Province of Brabant
- 1937-07-01 Retired from service
- 1939-08-28 Recalled to service
- 1939 - 1940 General Officer Commanding the 18th Division
