= 4th Infantry Division (Belgium) =

- Active: 1913-1918; 1939-1940; 1950s
- Disbanded: 28 May 1940
- Country: Belgium
- Branch: Belgian Army
- Type: Infantry
- Role: Conventional warfare
- Size: Division
- Part of: I Corps (Belgium)
- Garrison/HQ: Tongeren
- Engagements: First World War; Siege of Namur (1914); Siege of Antwerp (1914); Battle of the Yser; Hundred Days Offensive; Second World War; Battle of Belgium; Cold War

Commanders
- Notable commanders: Lt. General Édouard Michel

The 4th Infantry Division (4de Infanterie Divisie) was an infantry division of the Belgian Army that existed during the First World War (1914-18) and the Battle of Belgium (1940) in the Second World War.

== History ==
=== World War I ===
Before mobilization for the First World War in 1914, the 4th Infantry Division was based in Namur, with its troops spread out through the area. In the mobilization of Belgium, the division comprised the 8th, 10th, 13th, and 15th Mixed Brigades plus supporting Brigade and Divisional Lancer and Chasseurs Cavalry, classified as ‘4th Division’. The divisional Commander throughout its existence was Édouard Michel.

=== World War II ===
At the start of hostilities on 10 May, the 4th Division was stationed at the Albert Canal, on the left flank of the 7th Division. As it became clear very soon that this division was unable to hold the brunt of the German attack on Belgium, troops of the 4th were called upon to first help organizing a counterattack and, when that failed to materialize due to miscommunication, to improvise a defensive line between the Canal and Bilzen with the help of Group Ninitte. By 15.00 on 11 May, this line was pierced to the south of its flank. The 4th Division was spared encirclement only since German motorized units turned further south-west to meet the challenge of the armoured divisions of the French 1st Army, resulting in the Battle of Hannut.

The 4th Division managed a hasty escape and after some regrouping behind the KW Line, was placed in reserve at the Ghent Bridgehead. After the KW line was abandoned due to the breakthrough at Sedan, the 4th fought some skirmishes behind prepared lines. When the allied front was again shortened, the 4th was deployed behind the Lys river, between Nevele and Deinze. By this time, its complement of soldiers had fallen by half, two thirds of its anti tank guns, and almost all mortars and heavy machine guns were lost during the two retreats. This time, no prepared lines were available.

When the Germans attacked on 25 May, beginning the Battle of the Lys (1940), the 15th Regiment's front quickly crumbled, and after some fighting the neighbouring battalions of the 7th and the 11th were encircled. A counter-attack by the 1st Battalion 11th Regiment was cut short after the Germans used prisoners as human shields. By the end of the day, the Germans had advanced 6 km (3.7 mi) from the Lys towards Vinkt, setting the stage for a dramatic last stand at that time. Having lost most of its troops, the 4th Division was not in any position to participate at the fighting that followed. It surrendered with the rest of the army on 28 May. At least 201 personnel were estimated to be killed in action.

== Order of battle ==
=== 1940 ===
Structure of the division during the Battle of Belgium:

- Headquarters, at Hoeselt
- Commanding Officer, 4th Division - Lieutenant General de Grave
  - 7th Line Regiment
  - 11th Line Regiment
  - 15th Line Regiment
  - 8th Artillery Regiment
  - Bicycle Squadron (1st Light Horse)
  - 4th Engineer Battalion
  - 4th Signal Battalion
  - 4th Divisional Self-Propelled Anti-Tank Company (T-13 Tank destroyer)
  - 4th Divisional Anti-Tank Gun Company (lorried)
  - 4th Divisional Supply Battalion
  - 4th Divisional Field Hospital Battalion
  - 4th Divisional Quartermasters Company
  - 4th Divisional Military Police Unit

== See also ==
- Belgian Army order of battle (1914)
- Belgian Army order of battle (1940)
