= 1st Cavalry Division (Belgium) =

- Active: 1940
- Disbanded: 28 May 1940
- Country: Belgium
- Branch: Belgian Army
- Type: Cavalry Division
- Role: Combat Support
- Size: Division
- Part of: Group K (Belgium)
- Garrison/HQ: Saint-Hubert, Belgium
- Engagements: Second World War; Battle of Belgium

The 1st Cavalry Division (French: 1ere Division de Cavalerie) was a cavalry division of the Belgian Army that fought against the German Armed Forces in the Battle of Belgium.

== History ==
=== World War I ===
At the start of World War I, the 1st Cavalry Division was not formed yet, but was part of a reserve Cavalry Division as '1st Cavalry Brigade.' Its headquarters were in Brussels and was composed of the 1st and 2nd Guides Regiment.

=== World War II ===
When the 1st Cavalry Division was mobilized in late 1939, most of its regiments were at full strength. Two regiments of the 1st Cavalry Division (the 3rd Lancers regiment, and the 1st Cyclist regiment) left, weakening the division in 1940. The 1st Cavalry Division was positioned at the Belgian border near the Ardennes.

When the German offensive was confirmed, most of the 1st Cavalry Division was near Neufchateau and its main objective was to regroup with the retreating 1st Division of the Ardennes Hunters, and the other detachments of the Cavalry Division. Delays hampered the advance.

The 1st Cavalry division sent the 4th regiment Lancers to the 2nd Cavalry division and in turn, was reinforced with the 2nd Regiment Gidsen. The command system was thoroughly redistributed.

The Germans advanced at full speed. The K-W line was fully breached and the 1st Cavalry Division retreated west. The 1st Cavalry Division was ordered to fall to the Scheldt. But the Germans overran the positions and the Scheldt Canal was abandoned. The situation got worse when the Allied armies including the Belgians were encircled near Northern France and Flanders.

By May 25-26, the remainder of the division not yet killed or captured was again reorganized so they could be deployed in the Sluis Middelburg line. But the line was breached yet again, as 1st Cavalry Division was withdrawn and had to defend the quickly built defense of Strobugge-Maldegem-Oostwinkel axis. But the Germans moved on and after the breach of the last desperate defense, the division surrendered.

== Structure 1940 ==
Structure of the division at the eve of the Battle of Belgium:

•Headquarters, at Saint Hubert

•Commanding General, 1st Cavalry Division - Lieutenant -General Maurice Keyaerts

°1st Regiment Guides

°2nd Lancers Regiment

°3rd Lancers Regiment

°3rd Regiment Carabiners -Cyclists

°1st Regiment Carabiners-Cyclists

°17th Artillery Regiment

°25th Battalion Engineer

°28th Battalion of Transmission Forces

== See also ==
- Battle of Belgium order of battle
- Army Group B
- 2nd Cavalry Division
- K-W line
