= 16th Infantry Division (Belgium) =

- 16 ème Infanteriedivisie
- Active: 25 August 1939 - 28 May 1940; 1951-1994
- Country: Belgium
- Branch: Belgian Land Component
- Type: Infantry Division
- Role: Infantry
- Size: Division
- Part of: General Reserve
- Garrison/HQ: Ghent
- Engagements: Second World War; Battle of Belgium

Commanders
- Notable commanders: Lieutenant General, Georges Van Egroo

The 16th Infantry Division (Dutch: 16 ème Infanteriedivisie) was an Infantry Division of the Belgian Army that fought in the Battle of Belgium during the Second World War.

== History ==
=== Second World War ===
The 16th Infantry Division was mobilized in late 1939, becoming part of the General Reserve of the Army. Since its forces were mostly raw conscripts, they were sent to Beverlo Camp for refitting. The 16th Infantry Division had partially modernized with WWI Weaponry like other divisions from the Second Reserve.

At the start of hostilities in May 1940, the 16th Infantry Division was stationed west of the front lines, at the Ghent Bridgehead, and behind the main line. On May 13, the 16th Infantry Division had to give up its Cyclist Units. Even more troubling for the 16th Infantry Division is that the Albert Canal had been breached and contact with German Forces was possible at this stage.

On May 16, an unexpected Allied abandonment of the K-W line forced the Belgian Forces to retreat as well. The airfields in the sector were destroyed although some were spared. The 16th Infantry Division would now be an active division.

The 16th Infantry Division will be under the Command of Iste Army Corps along with the 1st Division and the 18th Division. They were sent north, taking positions near Melle. All troops positioned at Melle are informed of German intentions (taking Melle) as the defenses were bolstered.

The attack came the following day, but the German attack seemed to ground to a halt, as they lack the strength to break through. Minor skirmishes continue, but by May 22, the high command orders the front to fall back to Lye. Although they were reinforced by IV Corps with extra artillery support, desertion ran rapid. Even worse for the 16th division, the Germans discovered that Bruggenhoofd Gent was abandoned and already established a breach in the new defenses.

Pressure is steadily increasing, especially after Allied Forces (including the Belgians) have been encircled in Flanders. The remaining Cyclist Units were dispatched along railway lines to Sint-Pieters possibly to halt the German forces. There was a lack of Infantry to follow up with halts in the German advance.

The 16th Infantry Division needed reorganization. Most of the Division was transferred to VII Corps. The 16th Division was placed between Arsele and would have the remains of some regiments of other divisions. Still, the Germans had the 16th Infantry Division routed. Tielt was taken and a huge breach was made by the Germans. The Germans had already amassed their forces and are planning for another strike. The 16th Infantry Division raced to construct another defense, struggling to maintain a connection between them and other divisions.

By May 28, orders were not called upon as communication became a huge problem. It became clear that the Battle of Belgium was lost as the remaining Belgian Divisions either gave up or surrendered.

== Cold War ==
After the Second World War, a 16th Armoured Division was recreated as part of the army of occupation in Germany and then as part of NATO's Northern Army Group (NORTHAG). In 1960, the 16th Division was transformed into a mechanised division of the "Landcent" type. It consisted of:

- 17th Armoured Brigade (Duren),
- 16th Infantry Brigade (Ludenscheid),
- 4th Infantry Brigade (Soest).

In 1966, the Division was reduced to two active-duty two-brigade divisions :

- the 4th Mechanised Brigade at Soest,
- the 17th Armoured Brigade at Siegen

After the Dissolution of the Soviet Union, conscription in Belgium was abolished in 1992, and the 16th Infantry Division was dissolved in 1994.

== Structure in 1940 ==
On the eve of the Battle of Belgium, the division's structure was as follows:

- 16th Infantry Division
  - Divisional Headquarters
  - 37th Infantry Regiment
    - Regimental Headquarters
    - Staff Company
    - Medical Company
    - Scout Platoon
  - 41st Infantry Regiment
    - Regimental Headquarters
    - Staff Company
    - Medical Company
    - Scout Platoon
  - 44th Infantry Regiment
    - Regimental Headquarters
    - Staff Company
    - Medical Company
    - Scout Platoon
  - 24th Infantry Regiment
    - Regimental Headquarters
    - Staff Battery
    - 1st Artillery Battalion
    - 2nd Artillery Battalion
- 16th Signals Battalion
- 18th Engineer Battalion

== See also ==
- Army Group B
- 11th Infantry Division
- 18th Infantry Division
- K-W line
