= 10th Infantry Division (Belgium) =

- Active: 1940
- Disbanded: 28 May 1940
- Country: Belgium
- Branch: Belgian Army
- Type: Infantry Division
- Role: Infantry
- Size: Division
- Part of: VI Corps (Belgium)
- Garrison/HQ: Kortenberg
- Engagements: Battle of Belgium (World War II)

The 10th Infantry Division (Dutch: 10de Infanterie Divisie) was an Infantry Division of the Belgian Army that fought against the German Armed Forces in the Battle of Belgium.

== World War II ==
When mobilization was announced, the 10th Infantry Division, was part of the First Reserve with some of its regiments already active in the army. The Division was under the command of VI Corp, and because of the need to forces at the K-W line, the division was deployed to sector Leuven.

At the start of the German invasion, the 10th Infantry Division began fully operating in its sector. The Division is the only Infantry unit occupying the K-W line.

On May 11, the British expeditionary Army had arrived and came to take positions up the K-W line. Disagreement was brewing among the Allied command as the K-W line was manned by both the Belgians, the French, and British forces. The 2nd British Division takes up positions south of the 10th Infantry Division as a result.

After the abandonment of the K-W line by the Allies, the 10th Infantry Division was on to a slow retreat as the lack of vehicles meant delays. The 10th Infantry Division arrive at the new lines and was responsible of retaining a connection between them and the British.

10th Infantry Division can expect a major German attack and possible breakthrough. The attack officially came, with scouts alerting of the attack. But the Germans focus in the North, allowing the 10th Infantry Division to counterattack. News arrive that the British abandoned their positions, exposing the south to the Germans.

After the allied forces have been encircled in Northern France and Flanders, things have gone from bad to worse. The German pressure steadily increased, especially for the 10th Infantry Division with the Germans hoping to threaten the flanks exposed by the British.

Now, reinforced and supported with their organized Artillery, the Germans struck the 10th Infantry Division. The Belgian command orders a retreat. The 10th Infantry Division now had to defend a sector 11 km wide stretching from Ledegem, to Izegem.

A German attack near Ledegem failed but because of a lack of reserves, but the Germans managed to breach the lines west, causing a collapse of resistance. The 10th Infantry Division had to retreat.

Having lost most of its combat capabilities, the 10th Infantry Division had to lay down their weapons.

== Structure 1940 ==
Structure of the division at the eve of the Battle of Belgium.

•Headquarters, at Kortenberg

•Commanding Officer, 10th Infantry Division -Lieutenant- General Jules Pire

°3rd Regiment Foot Hunters

°5th Regiment of Hunters-on-foot (5th Regiment Foot Hunters)

°6th Regiment of Hunters-on-foot (6th Regiment Foot Hunters)

°10th Artillery Regiment

°8th Battalion Engineer

°10th Battalion Transmission Troops

°Cyclists Squadron 10ID(To the 10th Infantry Division)

== See also ==
- Battle of Belgium
- 11th Infantry Division
- 5th Infantry Division
- Battle of Belgium order of battle
- British Expeditionary Force(Army)
- K-W line
