= Édouard Michel du Faing d'Aigremont =

Belgian Army general

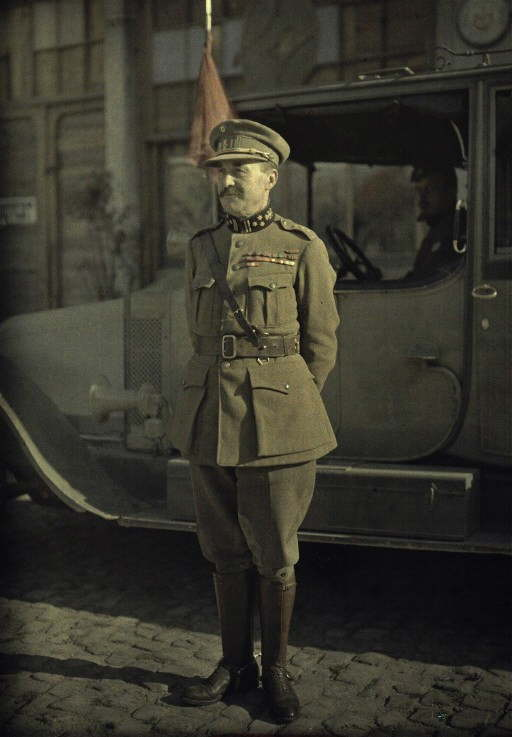
- Born: 14 May 1855; Charleroi, Belgium
- Died: 15 June 1931 (aged 76); Fays-Famenne, Belgium
- Burial place: Ixelles, Belgium
- Military career
- Allegiance: Belgium
- Service years: 1871-1920
- Rank: Lieutenant-general
- Commands: 4th Infantry Division (Belgium)
- Conflicts: World War I; Siege of Namur; Battle of the Yser; Hundred Days Offensive

Baron Augustin Édouard Michel du Faing d'Aigremont, born Augustin Édouard Michel (14 May 1855 – 15 June 1931) was a Belgian army officer and general who served during World War I.

== Career ==
Son of a mining engineer, he studied at the Athénée de Charleroi, and in 1871 at the Royal Military Academy in Brussels. He qualified in 1873 as an artillery officer, and rose through the ranks to become Inspector General of the Artillery in 1906.

In 1912, he was promoted to Lieutenant-General and received the command of the 4th Army Division based on in the Fortified Position of Namur. In August 1914, he commanded the division during the Siege of Namur, retreating towards Antwerp. He took part in the Battle of the Yser, where the 4th Division occupied the front between Kaaskerke and Tervate along the Nieuwpoort-Diksmuide railway line until its relief on 26 October 1914. From December 1914 to January 1917, the 4th Division remained in Wulpen. It participated on the general allied offensive in 1918 and crossed the Scheldt river on 8 November 1918, reaching the city of Ghent. After the war, Michel commanded the Belgian forces during the Occupation of the Rhineland. He retired in 1920 in order to work with the Royal Museum of the Armed Forces and Military History in Brussels.

In 1921, he was made Baron du Faing d'Aigremont. The barracks of the 17th Regiment of the Line in Mechelen was named after him, and numerous streets in different towns across the country are named in his honour.

== Honours ==
- Belgium: 1919 : Grand Cordon in the Order of Leopold.
