= 12th Infantry Division (Belgium) =

- Active: 1940
- Disbanded: 28 May 1940
- Country: Belgium
- Branch: Belgian Army
- Type: Infantry Division
- Role: Infantry
- Size: Division
- Part of: IV Corps (Belgium)
- Garrison/HQ: Wommelgem
- Engagements: Battle of Belgium (World War II)

The 12th Infantry Division (12de Infanterie Divisie) was an infantry division of the Belgian Army that existed during the Battle of Belgium during the Second World War.

== World War II ==
At the start of the war on May 10, 1940, the 12th Division was assigned the southernmost position of the Fortified Position of Antwerp, covering a portion of the anti-tank canal between St-Job-int-Goor and the Albert Canal at Massenhoven. Contrary to the Namur and Liège Positions, the forts of the Antwerp Positions were unmodernized forts of World War One vintage. Moreover, its artillery batteries were not replaced after being stripped down by the Germans during that conflict. Only some light and heavy machine gun positions were installed to support the infantry of the 12th Division.

During the first days of the conflict, the 12th's units saw elements of the French 7th army pass through its positions on their way to the Netherlands. When these units were defeated they hurriedly passed the Belgian line again, along with units of the 18th Belgian division which fought delaying actions in the Turnhout area. The French 4th 'dragons portés' where the last to pass through on the 15th of may. At this point, the 12th Division found itself in the first line of Allied forces.

As the Germans closed in, the order was given to abandon the Antwerp Position due to the French defeat in Sedan. The 12th was to regroup behind the Scheldt river, and then proceed to a reserve position at the Leie canal near Ursel. This withdrawal was seriously delayed due to intensive Luftwaffe bombing of remaining Belgian railway infrastructure.

When the Germans reached the English Channel on 22 May, the Belgian Army, along with the BEF and elements of the French Army, was cut off. It was decided to make a last ditch defense at the Lys and the canal, where the 12th was already in position. The division took up position between Veldekens and Ronsele, digging itself in behind the canal. The 2nd and 23rd regiments occupied the first echelon, the 22nd stood in reserve.

On May 24, the Germans undertook several attempts to cross the canal. A final attempt was successful after capturing a makeshift bridge prepared for a counterattack by surprise. Although the Germans quickly gained a foothold in the sector of the 2nd regiment, the commander of its neighbouring 23rd regiment staged a successful counterattack with the help of two battalions of the 22nd and 2nd regiments. Using a T-13 tank destroyer, the Belgians reached the canal again, took out German machine gun nests and destroyed the bridge. On the 25th, the remaining 235 German troops surrendered.

On the 26th, the Germans attacked again after hours of bombardment by artillery and Luftwaffe units. This time their attack was successful, especially in the sector of the 23rd. Division headquarters threw the remaining two battalions of the 22nd in the fight, with mixed success. At the end of the day, only the 2nd regiment held on to parts of its positions along the canal. The following day, the 12th Division was ordered to retreat east of Knesselaere. Only the 2nd and 22nd regiments did so in relatively good order, as the 23rd was nearly destroyed.

By the Belgian surrender on 28 May, at least 199 officers, NCO and enlisted were killed in action.

== Structure 1940 ==
Structure of the division at the eve of the Battle of Belgium:

- Headquarters, at Wommelgem
- Commanding Officer, 12th Division - Major-General Constant De Wulf
  - 2nd Line Regiment
  - 22nd Line Regiment
  - 23rd Line Regiment
  - 7th Artillery Regiment (Belgium)
  - 12th Bicycle Squadron (to the 1st lancers regiment)
  - 2nd Engineer Battalion
  - 12th Signal Battalion
  - 1st Divisional Anti-Tank Gun Company (lorried) -> to the 15th Division
  - 12th Divisional Supply Battalion
  - 12th Divisional Field Hospital Battalion
  - 12th Divisional Quartermaster Company
  - 12th Divisional Anti Aircraft Company
  - 12th Divisional Military Police Unit

== See also ==
- Belgian Army order of battle (1940)
