= 9th Infantry Division (Belgium) =

- 9 ème Infanteriedivisie
- Active: 25 August 1939 - 28 May 1940
- Country: Belgium
- Branch: Belgian Army
- Type: Infantry Division
- Role: Infantry
- Size: Division
- Part of: II Corps
- Garrison/HQ: Diest
- Engagements: Second World War; Battle of Belgium

Commanders
- Notable commanders: Lieutenant General Richard Vander Hofstadt

The 9th Infantry Division (Dutch: 9 ème Infanteriedivisie) was an Infantry Division of the Belgian Army that fought in the Battle of Belgium during the Second World War.

== History ==
=== Second World War ===
At the start of the war on 10 May 1940, the 9th division occupied one of the central sections of the Albert Canal line. In this position, it was not directly affected by the breakthrough at Eben-Emael for the first days of the war. Instead, the soldiers of the 9th witnessed fleeing civilians and advancing vanguards of the French 7th army passing through its lines. As a precaution, however, General Vander Hofstadt ordered the 17th and elements of the 16th regiments to take up a position along the Nete River, guarding the division's flank. Troops from these units saw panicking units of the 6th Division passing its line, causing unrest among the troops.

As by the evening of the 12th it was clear that the German breakthrough north of Liège could not be contained, the division was ordered to deploy behind the main line of resistance of the K-W Line. The 9th Division arrived by the 15th on its new sector, defending the city of Mechelen along well-prepared lines and buttressed by the fort of Walem.

Unfortunately, after the breakthrough at Sedan, the Belgian army was to retreat the K-W Line without much of a fight. At the new Scheldt line, the 9th Division was to take up position behind the Scheldt River just south of Ghent. The troops arrived there after much confusion on 18 May. At their new positions, the 8th and the 17th regiments skirmished with advance guards of the approaching Germans.

The 10th Division to its south, neighbouring the British Expeditionary Force, was under more serious attack. Since the British by the 21st were wavering, the 16th regiment was deployed to the very south of the Belgian line to prevent immediate envelopment. For the men of the 16th, this was the fourth line in less than two weeks which had to be hastily prepared. They promptly came under German artillery fire.

When the Germans reached the English Channel, a third retreat was ordered on 22 May. This time, the 9th was to take up reserve positions around Tielt, supporting the main line behind the Lys River. The 17th regiment was detached from the 9th division, and put at the disposal of the 2nd Division Chasseurs Ardennais.

By this time, there were signs of discipline breaking down, with some troops ordered to carry on at gunpoint.

In any case, the 9th was called into action soon after the German breakthrough near Kortrijk. They took up positions at the canal between Roeselare and the Lys on 24 May. This would be the last stand of the Division.

The 8th and 16th regiments took up positions near Ingelmunster and Izegem. However, they found out the Germans had already crossed the canal at several points. After heavy combat on the 25th and 26th, some involving door-to-door fighting in Izegem, the regiments were slowly giving away their positions at the canal. Despite some locally successful counterattacks south of Ardooie, by the end of 27th, the regiments were slowly disintegrating with the companies that were not captured falling back towards the sea.

By the surrender on the 28th, at least 212 officers, NCO and enlisted were killed in action.

== Structure ==
On the eve of the Battle of Belgium, the division's structure was as follows:

  - 8th Infantry Regiment
    - Regimental Headquarters
    - Staff Company
    - Medical Company
    - Scout Platoon
  - 16th Infantry Regiment
    - Regimental Headquarters
    - Staff Company
    - Medical Company
    - Scout Platoon
  - 17th Infantry Regiment
    - Regimental Headquarters
    - Staff Company
    - Medical Company
    - Scout Platoon
  - 4th Artillery Regiment
    - Regimental Headquarters
    - Staff Battery
    - 1st Artillery Battalion
    - 2nd Artillery Battalion
    - 3rd Artillery Battalion
    - 4th Artillery Battalion
- Armoured Anti-Tank Company
- 9th Signals Battalion
- 9th Engineer Battalion

== See also ==
- Belgian Army order of battle (1940)
