= I Corps (Belgium) =

1st Army Corps (1946–1948) 1st Battle Corps (1948–1951) 1st Army Corps (1951–1995)
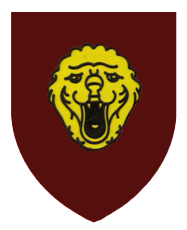
- Corps insignia
- Active: 1946–1995
- Country: Belgium
- Branch: Belgian Land Component
- Size: Corps

The 1st Corps of the Belgian Army (French: 1er Corps d'Armée belge), was a Belgian army corps active during First World War, Second World War, and the Cold War.

== World War II ==
During the Belgian Campaign of 1940, it initially held defences at Liège but was forced to retreat by the German XVI Panzer Corps. The Battle of Fort Ében-Émael occurred along the Corps' defensive line. German planners had recognised the need to eliminate Fort Ében-Émael if their army was to break into the interior of Belgium. It decided to deploy airborne forces (Fallschirmjäger) to land inside the fortress perimeter using gliders. Using special explosives and flamethrowers to disable the defences, the Fallschirmjäger then entered the fortress. In the course of the battle, German infantry overcame the defenders of the I Belgian Corps' 7th Infantry Division in 24 hours.

== Post-war service ==
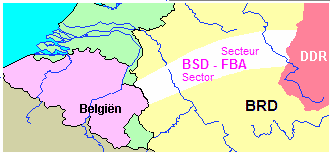
NATO Corps General Defence Plan sector for I (BE) Corps. Just to the north was I (BR) Corps and over the Central Army Group boundary to the south was III (GE) Corps of the German Army

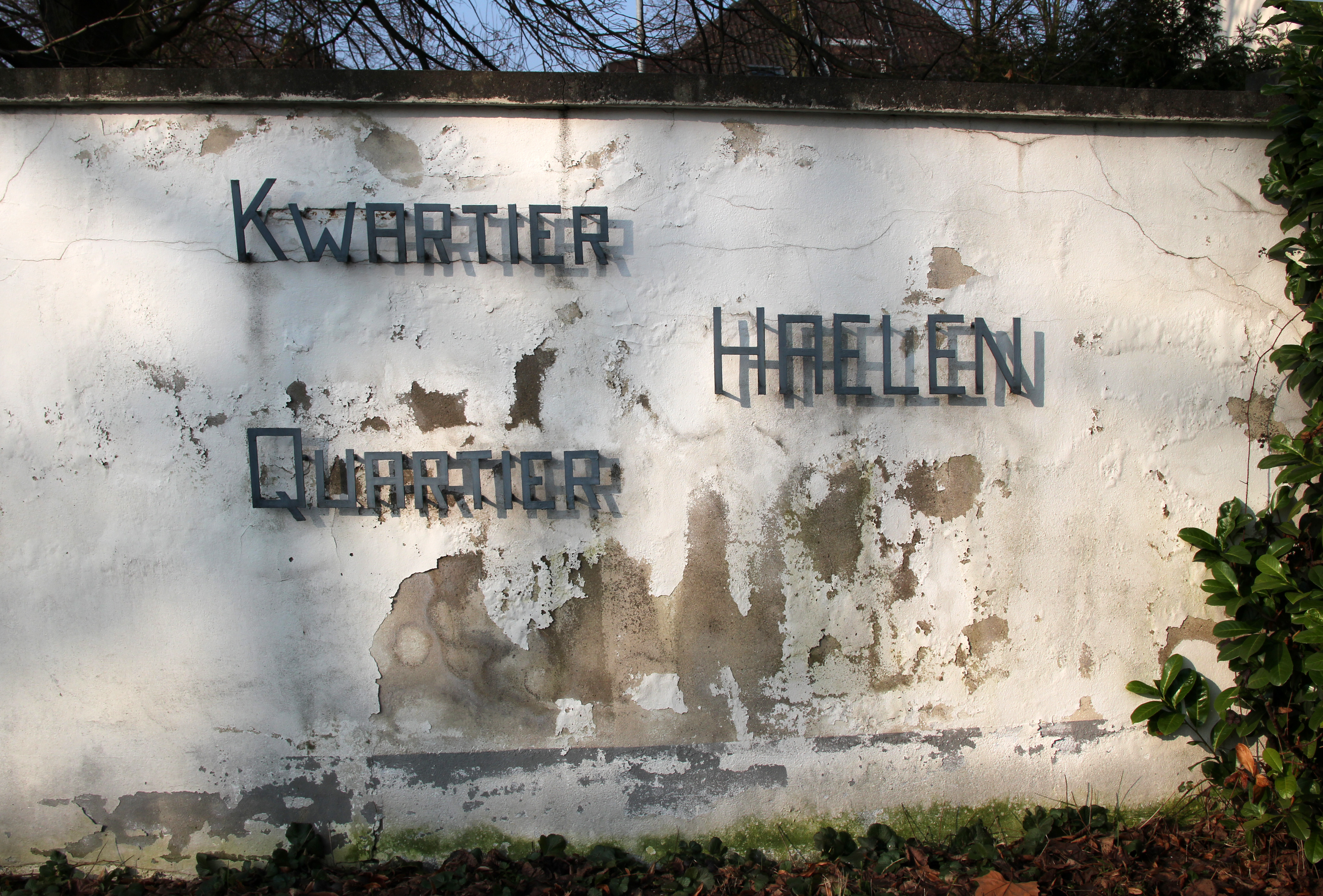
Belgian barracks "Quartier Haelen" at Köln-Junkersdorf, Germany

During the Cold War, it served initially as an army of occupation in Germany and then as part of NATO's Northern Army Group (NORTHAG). The corps headquarters was initially established at Yser Caserne, Lüdenscheid, on 15 October 1946. Lieutenant General Jean-Baptiste Piron took command in November 1946. Corps headquarters moved to Haelen Caserne, Junkersdorf, Lindenthal, Cologne, in 1948.

During Exercise Battle Royal in September 1954, the Corps consisted of 1 (BE) Infantry Division and 16 (BE) Armoured Division with 1 Canadian Brigade and 46th Parachute Brigade (16th Airborne Division) under command.

The corps' 14th and 20th Artillery Battalions were supported by the 4th U.S. Army Field Artillery Detachment. The detachment was co-located with the Belgian battalions, in quarters across the street from the Belgian Houthulst Kaserne, on Langenwiedenweg Strasse, Werl, West Germany.

In 1960, the 1st and 16th Divisions were transformed into mechanised divisions of the "Landcent" type. That year, 1st Division at Bensberg consisted of:

- 1st Infantry Brigade (Siegen),
- 7th Brigade (Spich),
- 18th Armoured Brigade (Euskirchen),

The 16th Armoured Division consisted of:

- 17th Armoured Brigade (Duren),
- 16th Infantry Brigade (Ludenscheid),
- 4th Infantry Brigade (Soest).

In 1966 the Belgian Army's active force was mechanised, and the force was reduced to two active-duty two-brigade divisions (in 1985, the 16th in Germany with the 4th Mechanised Brigade at Soest, and the 17th Armoured Brigade at Siegen, and the 1st in Belgium with the 1st Mechanised Brigade at Bourg Leopold and the 7th Mechanised Brigade at Marche, in the Ardennes region.) In 1985 there were also two reserve brigades, the 10th Mechanised and 12th Motorised.

In 1995, the corps merged with the 1st Mechanised Division and Paracommando Brigade to become the "Intervention Force". The corps' HQ was relocated from Germany back into Belgium in 1996.

== See also ==
- Belgian Forces in Germany
