= 7th Infantry Division (Belgium) =

- Active: 1940
- Disbanded: 28 May 1940
- Country: Belgium
- Branch: Belgian Army
- Type: Infantry
- Role: Conventional warfare
- Size: Division
- Part of: I Corps (Belgium)
- Garrison/HQ: Tongeren
- Engagements: World War II: Battle of Belgium; Battle of Fort Ében-Émael

The 7th Infantry Division (7de infanterie divisie) was an infantry division of the Belgian Army that existed during the Battle of Belgium during the Second World War.

== History ==
=== World War II ===
At the outbreak of hostilities, the 7th Division occupied the easternmost section of the Covering Position at the confluence of the Albert Canal and the Meuse river. As such it directly bordered the Netherlands, implying few obstacles existed between the German onslaught and its lines since the Dutch army did not defend the Maastricht area of Limburg province. Moreover, before any targets on the Dutch side could be engaged by artillery, express permission from general HQ had to be given. Compensating for these apparent weaknesses was the presence of the fortress of Eben-Emael, which was built alongside the Albert Canal and was considered at that time to be 'impregnable'.

The 7th Division was to prevent an early breakthrough of the Albert Canal line by destroying the bridges of Kanne, Veldwezelt and Vroenhoven as soon as the invasion began. Unfortunately for the Belgians, the German invasion plan featured an all-out assault on this part of the Belgian front as part of the feint attack which was to distract the allies from the main attack at Sedan.

So, when the Germans struck in full force early in the morning of May 10, they made good use of novel airborne tactics on the lines of the 7th Division. The Belgians managed only to destroy the bridge of Kanne, while the fort of Eben-Emael was neutralized by the Germans after just a few hours of fighting.

By the early morning the Germans, supported by Stuka dive bombers, established wide bridgeheads on the West bank of the Albert Canal. Minor counterattacks, among others by the division's tank destroyer company, were easily repulsed by turning captured anti-tank guns against the Belgians. As soon as the main body of the German Panzer Divisions started crossing the Canal, the fate of the 7th Division was sealed. By the morning of the 11th, two of its regiments (the 18th Line and 2nd Carabiniers) disintegrated and the division's remaining forces were in full retreat.

The division's chief of staff and three regimental colonels were captured during the German advance, along countless soldiers. 483 soldiers were estimated to have been killed in action.

After the initial fighting, the remaining troops of the 7th Division were sent to Leuven and to France for regrouping and refitting.

== Organization ==
=== 1940 ===
Structure of the division during the Battle of Belgium:

- Headquarters, at Tongeren
- Commanding Officer, 7th Division - Major General van Trooyen
  - 18th Line Regiment
  - 2nd Grenadier Regiment
  - 2nd Carabinier Regiment
  - 20th Artillery Regiment
  - Bicycle Squadron (1st Guides)
  - 6th Engineer Battalion
  - 7th Signal Battalion
  - 7th Divisional Motorcycle Reconnaissance Company
  - 7th Divisional Self-Propelled Anti-Tank Company (T-13 Tank destroyer)
  - 7th Divisional Anti-Tank Gun Company (lorried)
  - 7th Divisional Supply Battalion
  - 7th Divisional Field Hospital Battalion
  - 7th Divisional Quartermasters Company
  - 7th Divisional Military Police Unit

== Trivia ==
Louis-Paul Boon, Flemish writer, served as an enlisted soldier in the 2nd Carabiniers regiment. On May 11, he was captured as his company was flanked by the Germans. A passage in his novel "My little war" refers to his experiences near Veldwezelt.

== See also ==
- Order of battle for the Battle of France

== Notes ==
- Thomas, Nigel (2014). Hitler's Blitzkrieg Enemies 1940. Great Britain: Osprey. ISBN 978-1-78200-596-4.
