= 13th Infantry Division (Belgium) =

Infantry division of the Belgian Army

- Active: 1940
- Disbanded: 28 May 1940
- Country: Belgium
- Branch: Belgian Army
- Type: Infantry Division
- Role: Infantry
- Size: Division
- Part of: V Corps (Belgium)
- Garrison/HQ: Schoten
- Engagements: Battle of Belgium (World War II)

The 13th Infantry Division (13de Infanterie Divisie) was an infantry division of the Belgian Army that fought in the Battle of Belgium against the Wehrmacht during the Second World War.

== World War Two ==
Like the 15th Division, part of the same IV Corps, the 18th was composed entirely of regiments of the older reserve. As such, it mostly lacked heavy weaponry such as AA guns and anti-tank artillery. Its infantry units were equipped with antiquated weapons of World War One vintage. Therefore, the 18th was, at the start of the campaign deployed alongside the canal of Schoten-Dessel as a covering force for the Albert Canal line. Even in this role, the entire division was deemed to strong, so that one infantry regiment (the 3rd Grenadiers) was transferred to the coast and another was used as reserve for the Corps. Some mobile units from other formations were attached to make it fit for a more mobile role.

At the start of hostilities, the 18th was supposed to blow the bridges of the Schoten-Dessel Canal to slow down the German advance. But when the war started on 10 May, General Six got word the French 7th Army would pass through its sector to assist the Dutch. Still, the bridges east of Turnhout were destroyed, much to the dismay of the French, who would arrive by the evening at the canal.

Due to the arrival of the French, the 18th Division was ordered to stay longer at the canal then planned. As the 7th Army deployed, General Six was to co-ordinate his efforts with those of the French. At the same time, the first German scouts crossed the Dutch border into Belgium.

First contact was made by the 3rd Carabiniers near Arendonk on the 12th. Meanwhile, General Six found out the bridges over the Albert Canal were blown up, effectively cutting his prepared lines of retreat. By the 13th the 3rd Carabiniers were engaged in a pitched battle at the Schoten-Dessel Canal. By nightfall, the order for a general retreat to the Antwerp position was given. One battalion of the 3rd did not receive the orders in time and was largely captured.

After breakthrough at Sedan, orders came for a second retreat towards Ghent. There, it was to take position between Oostakker and Destelbergen, effectively covering the eastern approaches to the city. By that time, there were signs discipline was starting to fray.

At the 21st, the 39th was engaged for the first time against German scouts. But the following day, as the Germans reached the English Channel, orders came for yet another retreat towards the Lys River.

Again the weaker 18th was to play a covering role, taking position in Ghent itself. While the 3rd and the 39th took op position, the Germans send several negotiators under the cover of a white flag to demand the surrender of the city. Egged on by unwilling city-dwellers and local police officers, several units of these regiments surrendered en masse, defying the orders of their superior officers. Only a few battalions of each regiment conducted a retreat to the Lys river.

Still, due to the breakthrough of the Germans at the Lys near Kortrijk, the weakened 18th was ordered into action at the former sector of the 9th Division near Ursel. Parts of that Division were withdrawn in an attempt to contain that breakthrough. As the 18th took up position next to the 7th Chasseurs, it quickly came under sustained artillery fire suggesting the Germans would soon attack their sector in force, too.

On the 26th of may, that attack came indeed. By noon, the Germans gained a foothold on the Belgian side of the Lys canal and pressed on towards Maldegem. An attempt at counterattack by the remaining 39th was easily stopped in its tracks by the quick German advance. By the end of the day what was left of the Division pulled back to Maldegem where a last ditch defense of the town followed.

By the Belgian surrender on 28 May, at least 101 officers, NCO and enlisted were killed in action.

== Structure 1940 ==
Structure of the division at the eve of the Battle of Belgium:

- Headquarters, at Schoten
- Commanding Officer, 13th Division – Major-General François Duthoy
  - 32nd Line Regiment
  - 33rd Line Regiment
  - 34th Line Regiment
  - 21st Artillery Regiment (Belgium)
  - 13th Bicycle Squadron (to the 18th Division)
  - 14th Engineer Battalion
  - 13th Signal Battalion
  - 13th Divisional Supply Battalion
  - 13th Divisional Field Hospital Battalion
  - 13th Divisional Quartermaster Company
  - 13th Divisional Military Police Unit

== See also ==
- Belgian Army order of battle (1940)
- (The forces opposing the 13th Infantry Division in charge of taking the Low Countries, Belgium, Luxembourg, and the Netherlands) Army group B.
