= K-W Line =

Fortified defence line in Belgium

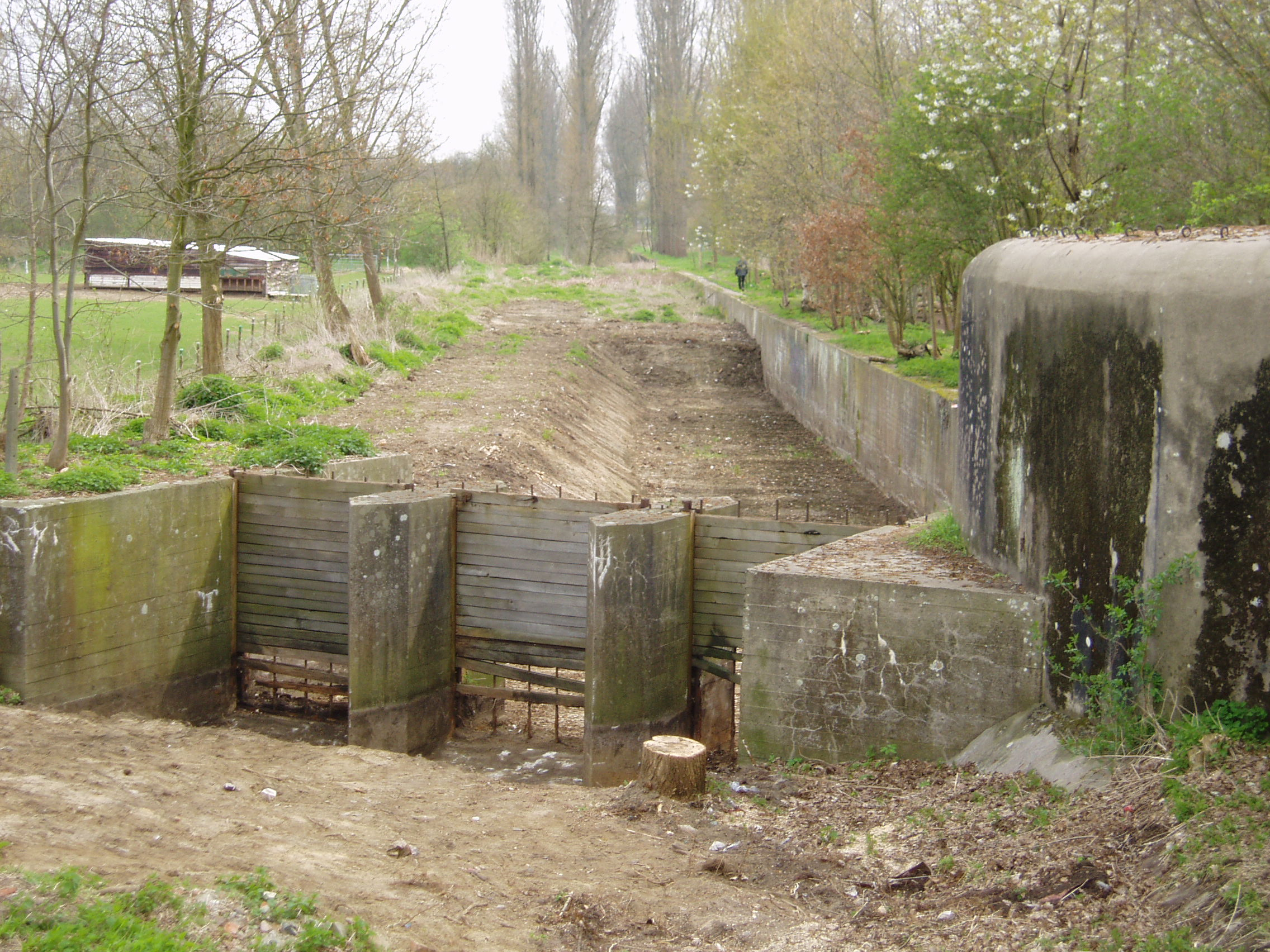
View of bunker H4 and the water duct used to flood the area in front of the tank barricade near the village of Haacht. This is part of the K–W line.

The Koningshooikt–Wavre Line, abbreviated to KW Line (French: Ligne KW; Dutch: KW-stelling) and often known as the Dyle Line after the Dijle (Dyle) river, was a 60-kilometre-long (37 mi) fortified line of defence prepared by the Belgian Army between Koningshooikt (Province of Antwerp) and Wavre (Province of Brabant) which was intended to protect Brussels from a possible German invasion. Construction on the KW Line began in September 1939 after World War II had begun but while Belgium itself remained a neutral state. It was subsequently extended southwards from Wavre towards Namur (Province of Namur). The line itself consisted of bunkers, anti-tank ditches, and barricades including so-called Cointet-elements and played a key role in Allied strategy during the German invasion of Belgium in May 1940. However, its role in the actual fighting was ultimately minimal. In 2009 an inventory of surviving emplacements was begun.

== Background ==
In October 1936, Belgium abandoned its previous military alliance with France, fearful that after the German Remilitarization of the Rhineland, bringing German forces to its borders, it would get involved in a Franco-German war. It was recognised that a policy of neutrality could only be viable if Belgium possessed strong defences. Existing defence plans were therefore pursued more vigorously. A strong defence line was created along the Albert Canal, running eastwards from Antwerp to the modern fortress of Eben Emael and from there to the southwest along the River Meuse. Although this was a powerful position, it had been understood from the outset that Belgium could not resist a major German invasion alone and that despite its neutrality would need to cooperate with the French army to block a German advance. Eben Emael was too close to Germany, and the salient it created was too large, to make it practical for assisting French forces to occupy such a forward position. For this reason a shorter defence line was planned between Antwerp and Namur in the south. This should be the "line of main resistance", while the Albert Canal-Meuse line would function as a "covering line", delaying the enemy long enough for allied help to arrive and entrench itself. However, the Belgian government was hesitant to start any large-scale construction along this line as it could be seen by Germany as a breach of neutrality as well as an invitation to occupy the area to the east of it.

After the outbreak of the Second World War, Belgium was under considerable pressure from France and Britain to take their side even before a German invasion, partly because it was feared Belgian defences would collapse before allied troops had the time to reinforce them. To assuage such fears, the Belgian government hastily ordered the improvement of the Antwerp-Namur position in September 1939. The construction work was largely done by conscripts mobilised in September but also by about a thousand civilian workers hired from private contractors.

== Location ==
Sketch of Belgian fortifications on the eve of the Second World War.

The line in the north was anchored on the old fortress belt of Antwerp. This way the existing Fort Broechem, Fort Lier and Fort Koningshooikt could be used. From the latter fort southwards, the line continued to Haacht, protecting the city of Mechelen. From Haacht it ran to Leuven, which city was incorporated into the frontline. Originally, this had not been the case: in this sector between November 1939 and April 1940 the line was shifted to the east four times. The next twenty kilometres, the line followed the course of the River Dyle until Wavre was reached. The area between Koningshooikt and Wavre represented the main position where the Belgian army was expected to fight, and to the improvement of which most funds were directed. This explains the name Koningshooikt-Wavre line.

From February 1940 onwards, the line was extended to the south in the direction of Namur, to close the so-called "Gembloux Gap" between the Dyle and the Meuse. Also a branch westwards of Wavre was created, running to Waterloo, Halle and Kester, ending in Ninove. This covered the southern approaches of the Belgian capital Brussels. This extension was more symbolic than real, containing only thirty-eight pillboxes and an anti-tank line made out of Cointet elements, and it served to counter German allegations that the K-W line violated Belgian neutrality by being directed against Germany. The western branch pretended to block a possible French advance.

== Structure ==
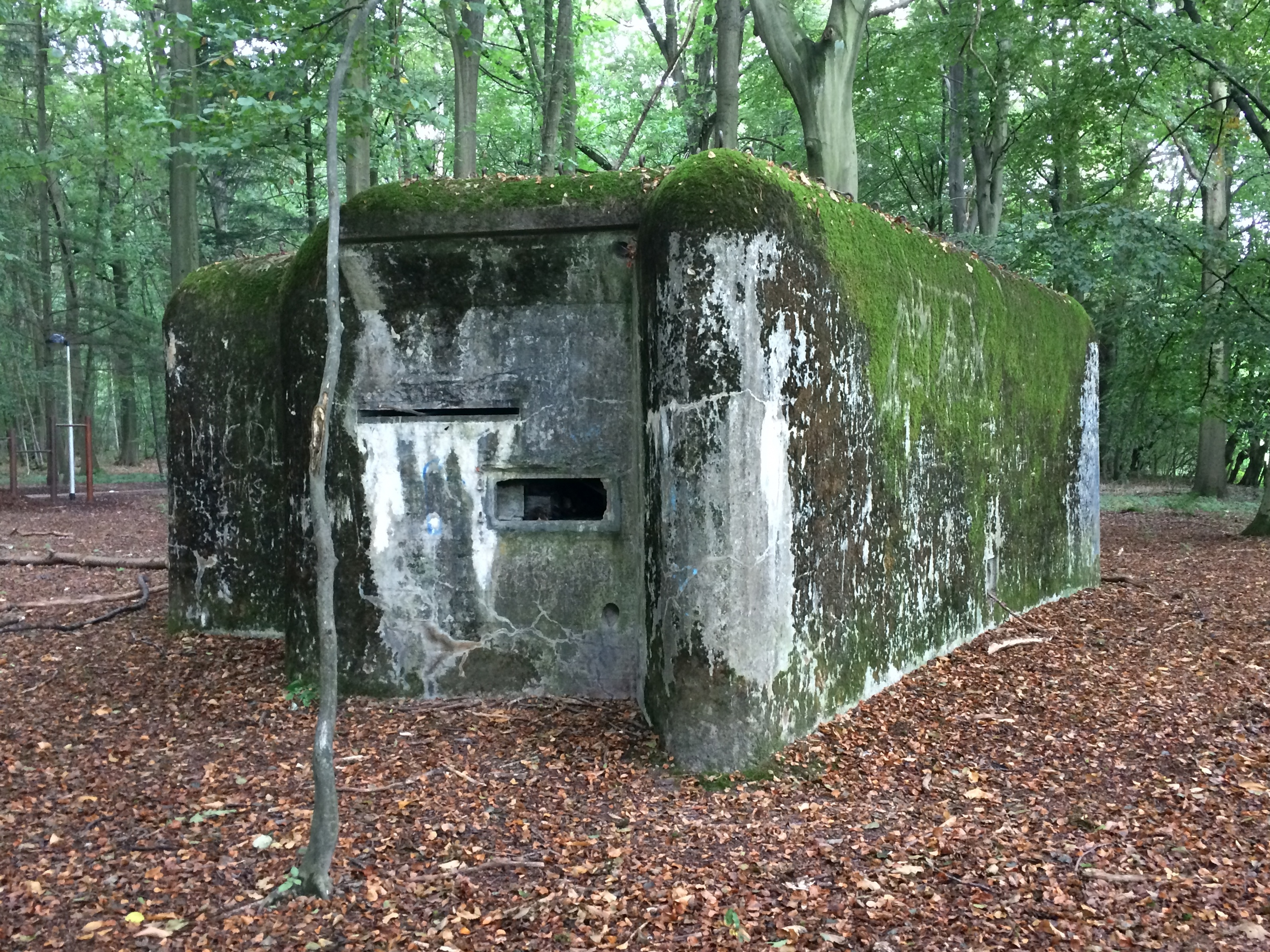
Pillbox in Wavre, allowing enfilading fire

The K-W line was not a massive fortification line with modern forts sheltering the artillery, like the French Maginot Line. There were no permanent fortress garrisons occupying it. In case of war, regular infantry divisions had to entrench themselves along the line after having been withdrawn from the Albert Canal-Meuse covering line. Construction work was aimed at preparing this entrenchment by providing a pre-existing infrastructure, consisting of a telephone network, command bunkers, pillboxes for the machine guns, anti-tank obstacles and inundations. Little was done in the way of digging trenches, placing barbed wire entanglements or laying minefields beforehand.

About four hundred concrete pillboxes were constructed. Most of these were placed along a forward line of defence, directly behind main obstacles. To provide some depth, about a kilometre to the west a second line of pillboxes was present. However, when inundations were located in front of the forward line, these were considered to offer enough protection that a second pillbox line could be dispensed with. In front of Mechelen, the river Dyle curved to the west. This was seen as an especially vulnerable spot and between the Dyle and the River Nete a third line of pillboxes was constructed covering the eastern approaches of Mechelen. Multiple lines were also present west of Leuven, due to the many changes in the construction plans. The pillboxes were able to withstand hits by the German 15 cm sFH 18, the heaviest howitzer German infantry divisions were equipped with. They were not of a uniform construction; each pillbox was tailored to adapt to the specific terrain conditions of its location, avoiding dead angles and often allowing enfilading fire. To this end they contained up to three chambers in which a single machine gun could be placed. The machine guns were not permanent fixtures; the troops retreating from the covering line were supposed to bring their MG 08s, called "Maxims", along.

Thousands of Cointet-elements were installed on the K-W Line between the village Koningshooikt and the city Wavre to act as the main line of defence, against a possible German armoured invasion through the heartland of Belgium, forming a long iron wall. The Cointet-elements were also used as an anti-tank line in a branch of the K-W Line, which was meant to defend the southern approaches to Brussels. This line branched off the main line in Waver and ran from there to Halle and then to Ninove, where it ended on the banks of the Dender. The Cointet-elements were placed next to each other in a zig-zag and connected with steel cables. Near main roads they were fixed to heavy concrete pillars that were fixed into the ground to allow local traffic passage. In May 1940 however, due to a relocation programme, the elements did not form a continuous line and thus were easily bypassed by the 3rd and 4th Panzer Divisions.

== See also ==
- Grebbe Line
- Maginot Line
- Peel-Raam Line
- Schuster Line
- Manstein plan
