= Inter-Allied Victory Medal =

Inter-Allied Victory Medal may refer to:

- Victory Medal 1914–1918 (Belgium)
- 1914–1918 Inter-Allied Victory medal (France)
- Inter-Allied Victory Medal (Greece)
- Allied Victory Medal (Italy)
- Victory Medal (Japan)
- Victory Medal (Romania)
- Victory Medal (South Africa)
- Victory Medal (United Kingdom)
- World War I Victory Medal (United States)
