= Victory Medal =

Victory Medal may refer to:

== World War I ==
- 1914–1918 Inter-Allied Victory medal (France)
- Allied Victory Medal (Italy)
- Victory Medal 1914–1918 (Belgium)
- Inter-Allied Victory Medal (Greece)
- Victory Medal (Japan)
- Victory Medal (Romania)
- Victory Medal (South Africa)
- Victory Medal (United Kingdom)
- World War I Victory Medal (United States)

== World War II ==
- World War II Victory Medal (United States)
- Merchant Marine World War II Victory Medal, United States

== Others ==
- Cold War Victory Medal, United States National Guard
