= Victory Medal (Romania) =

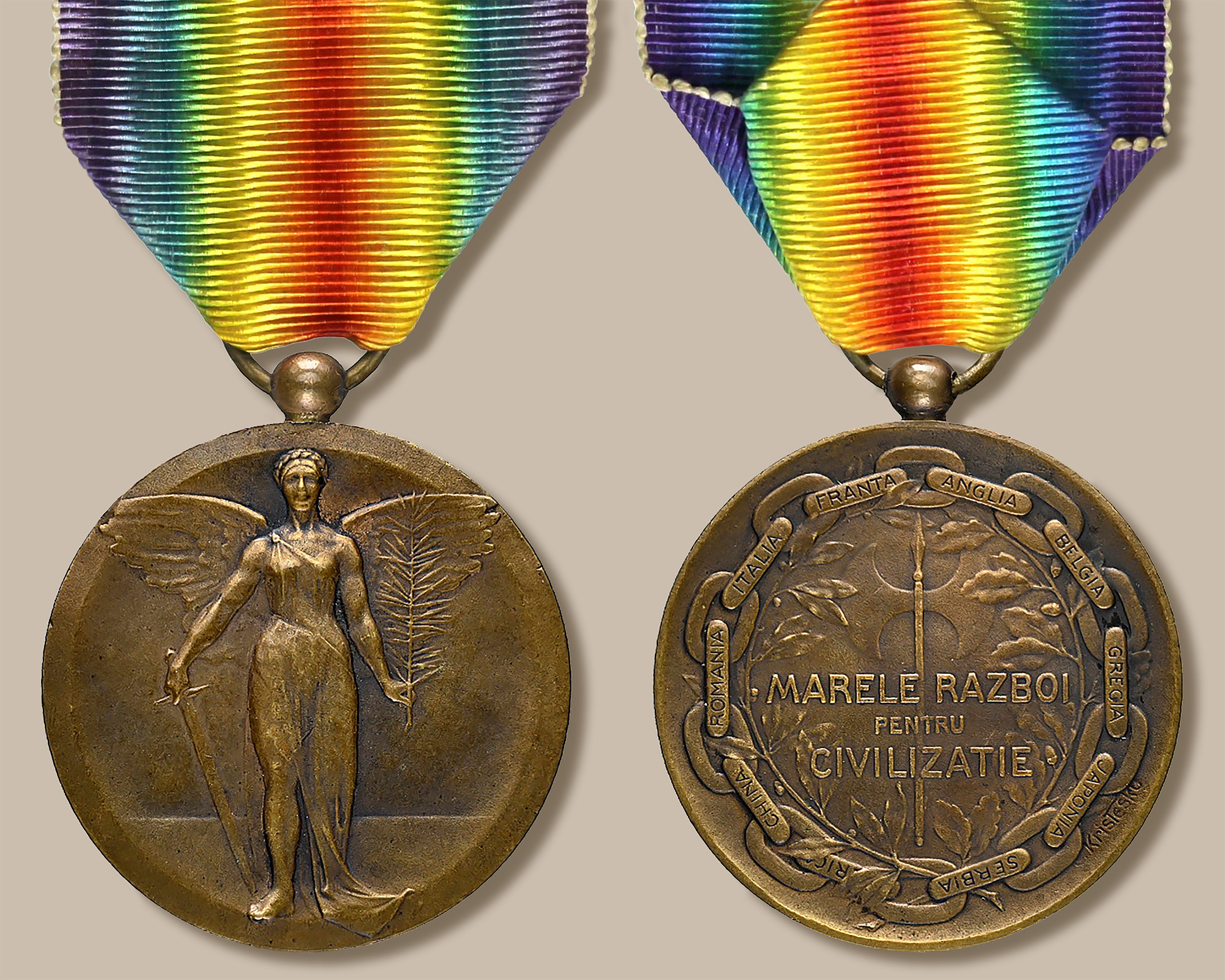
- by the Romanian medalist Constantin Kristescu
- Type: Campaign medal
- Awarded for: Campaign service
- Description: Bronze disk, 36mm diameter
- Presented by: Romania
- Eligibility: Romanian Army
- Campaigns: First World War, Hungarian–Romanian War
- Clasps: None
- Established: 20 July 1921

Highlights
- Total: around 300.000
- Ribbon bar

Precedence
- Next (higher): Commemorative Cross of the 1916–1918 War

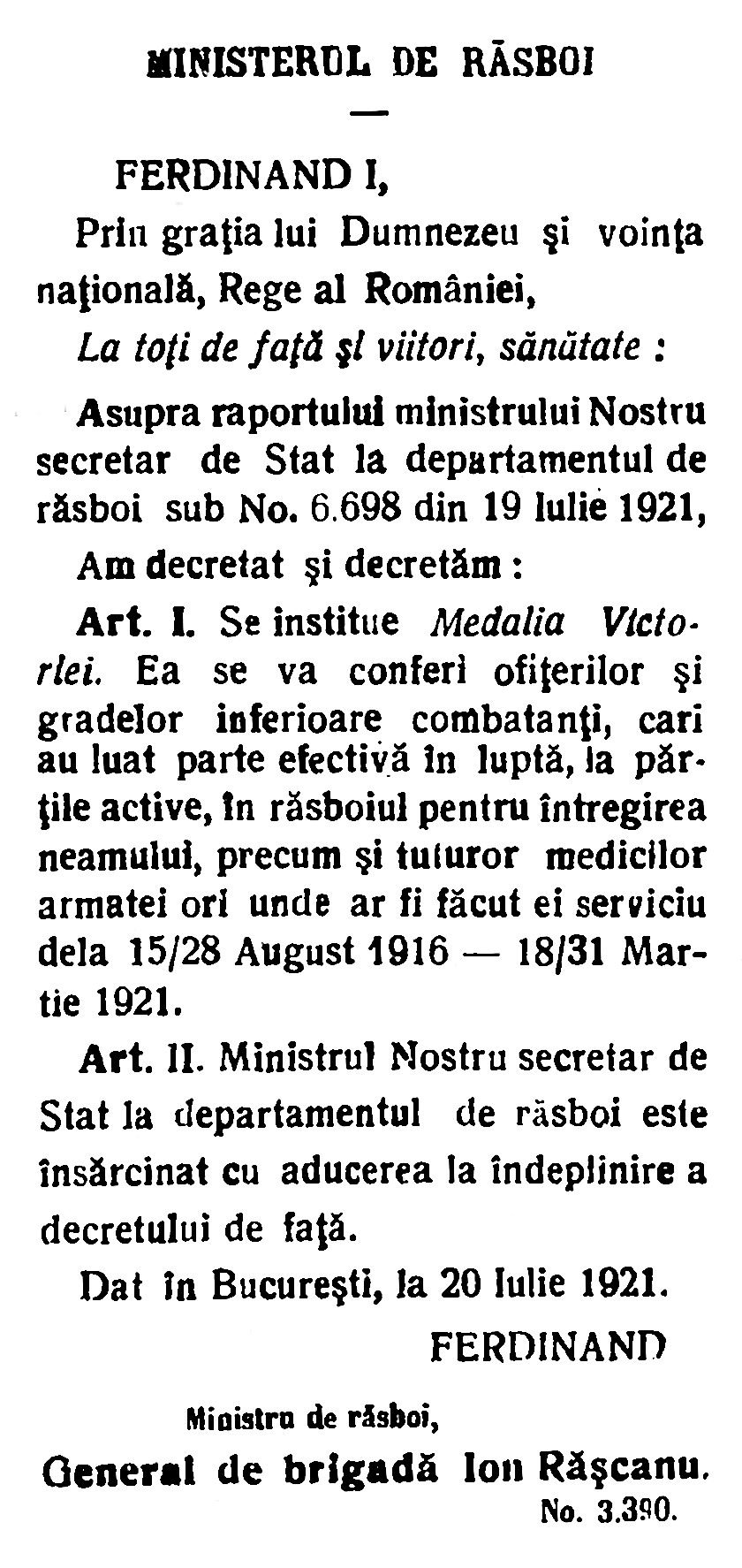
Royal Decree for establishing the Victory Medal of Romania

The Victory Medal is a Romanian First World War campaign medal established on 20 July 1921 by Royal Decree.

The design and ribbon was also adopted by Belgium, Brazil, Cuba, Czechoslovakia, France, Greece, Italy, Japan, Portugal, Romania, Siam, Union of South Africa and the US in accordance with the decision of the Inter-Allied Peace Conference at Versailles (a Winged Victory). A particular form of the historic Greek monument of 'Victoria' was chosen by each nation, except the nations in the Far East who issued the medal but with a different design.

== Eligibility ==
To qualify for the Victory Medal, recipients, of any rank, had to be mobilised for war service and to have taken part in a battle between 28 August 1916 and 31 March 1921, or to have served as an army medic. Thus were also included the combatants from the Hungarian–Romanian War.

== Description ==
The design proposals of the medal were to be submitted to an international jury. For the Romanian version, the jury selected the design of Lt. Col. Constantin Kristescu, who was also put in charge with its effective sculpting. It was manufactured in Paris, where Kristescu used to work with La Maison Arthus-Bertrand. The Victory Medal issued by Romania is a 36mm diameter circular bronze medal.

- The obverse of the Romanian version shows the winged, full-length, full-front, standing figure of 'Victory', holding a palm branch in her left hand and a sword pointing downward in her right hand.
- The reverse has the words "MARELE RĂZBOI / PENTRU / CIVILIZAȚIE" ("The Great War / For / Civilization") in three lines, over a halberd, all surrounded by a ring with twenty links braided with a laurel and oak wreath. On each of the ten large links is engraved the name of one of the Allied countries: England, Belgium, Greece, Japan, Serbia, United States, China, Romania, Italy and France. The sculptor signed himself as 'Kristesko' near Japan's link.
- The 39mm wide ribbon has an iridescent colour scheme, with the violet moving through to a central red stripe where both schemes meet.

== Usage and hierarchy ==
The medal was displayed on official occasions and ceremonies on the left breast of the jacket. On other occasions, it was customary to display only the ribbon bar, pinned on the left buttonhole. In the hierarchy of the Romanian military and civil awards and decorations from the mid 1930s, the Victory Medal held the very low 33rd place. The customary hierarchy of the military decorations was (not including those from the Independence War):

1. Order of Michael the Brave
2. The Military Virtue
3. The Aeronautical Virtue
4. The Cross of Queen Marie
5. The Sanitary Merit Cross
6. Valour and Faith with swords
7. The Country's Momentum
8. Commemorative Cross of the 1916–1918 War
9. Victory Medal

== International award ==
As well as Romania, a significant number of allied and associated countries involved in the conflict against the Austro-German alliance issued a Victory Medal.

The proposition of such common award was first made by French marshal Ferdinand Foch who was supreme commander of the allied force during the war. Each medal in bronze has the same diameter (36 mm) and ribbon (double rainbow) but with a national design representing a winged victory except for Japan and Siam where the concept of a winged victory was not culturally relevant.

The following versions were finally awarded:

Inter-Allied Victory Medal by Country
Country	Designer	Manufacturer	Number issued	Obverse	Reverse	Established by
Belgium	Paul Du Bois (1859–1938)	-----	300,000–350,000			Royal Decree from 15 July 1919
Brazil	Jorge Soubre (1890–1934)	Casa da Moeda - Rio de Janeiro	approximately 2,500			Decree nr. 16074 from 22 June 1923
Cuba	Charles Charles	Etablissements Chobillon	6,000–7,000			Decree nr. 905 from 10 June 1922
Czechoslovakia	Otakar Španiel (1881–1955)	Kremnice Mint	approximately 89,500			Decree from 27 July 1920
France	Pierre-Alexandre Morlon (1878–1951)	Monnaie de Paris	approximately 2,000,000			Law from 20 July 1922
France	Charles Charles (Note: Unofficial type.)	Etablissements Chobillon	-----			Law from 20 July 1922
France	M. Pautot and Louis Octave Mattei	-----	-----			Law from 20 July 1922
Greece	Henry-Eugène Nocq (1868–1944)	V. Canale	approximately 200,000			Law from 22 September 1920
Italy	Gaetano Orsolini (1884–1954)	Sacchini-Milano; S.Johnson-Milano; F.M.Lorioli & Castelli-Milano	approximately 2,000,000			Royal Decree nr. 1918 from 16 December 1920
Japan (Note: On the obverse the winged figure of Victory was replaced by Takemikazuchi, the war god in Japanese mythology.)	Shokichi Hata	Osaka Mint	approximately 700,000			Imperial Edict nr 406 from 17 September 1920
Poland (Note: For reasons still not known, Poland did not proceed with the manufacture of the medal at their mint. The medal shows a clearly visible “MK” (Mint Kremnica). The medal may possibly be an unofficial strike by a veterans’ group.)	.... Vlaitov	Mint Kremnica	-----			
Portugal	João Da Silva (1880–1960)	Da Costa	approximately 100,000			Decree from 15 July 1919
Romania	Constantin Kristescu (1871–1928)	La Maison Arthus-Bertrand	approximately 300,000			Royal Decree nr 3390 from 20 July 1921
Siam (Thailand) (Note: On the obverse the winged figure of Victory was replaced by Narayana (Vishnu), the Hindu god of preservation and protector of the universe.)	Itthithepsan Kritakara (1890–1935)	-----	approximately 1,500			
South Africa (Note: The text on the reverse is in English and Dutch.)	William McMillan (1887–1977)	Woolwich Arsenal	approximately 75,000			Decree from 1 September 1919
United Kingdom (Note: Awarded not only to British combatants but as well to those from the dominions of Canada, Australia, New Zealand and those from the Empire of India.)	William McMillan (1887–1977)	Woolwich Arsenal; Wright & Son	6,334,522 plus			Decree from 1 September 1919
United States	James Earle Fraser (1876–1953)	Arts Metal Works Inc.; S.G.Adams Stamp & Stationary Co.; Jos. Mayer Inc.	approximately 2,500,000			General Order nr 48 from 9 April 1919 of the Department of War
Source unless otherwise indicated: Alexander J. Laslo (1986). The Interallied Victory Medals of World War I. Albuquerque: Dorado Publishing. ISBN 0961732008. Notes

== See also ==
- Order of Michael the Brave
- Commemorative Cross of the 1916–1918 War
