= Inter-Allied Victory Medal (Greece) =

Greek World War I medal

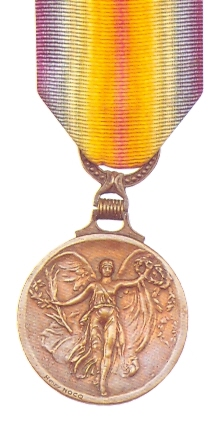
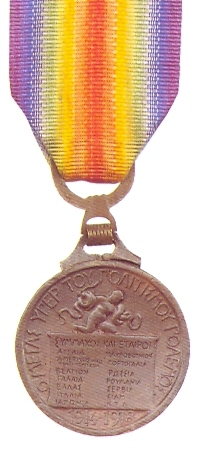
Obverse (left) and reverse (right) views of the medal

The Inter-Allied Victory Medal (Greek: Διασυμμαχικόν Μετάλλιον της Νίκης) is a campaign medal issued by Greece, commemorating the Allied victory in the First World War.

== Greek award ==
The medal is the Greek version of a common design used among all Allied nations, following a proposal made by Marshal Ferdinand Foch, who was supreme commander of the Allied Forces during the war. In Greece, the medal was instituted by Law 2481 on 22 September 1920 (O.S.).

Each medal, in bronze, has the same diameter (36 mm) and ribbon (double rainbow), but with a national design representing a winged Victory. The Greek version of the medal was designed by Henry-Eugène Nocq.

It features an ancient Greek-style Victory on the obverse, and on the reverse the circular inscription Ο ΜΕΓΑΣ ΥΠΕΡ ΤΟΥ ΠΟΛΙΤΙΣΜΟΥ ΠΟΛΕΜΟΣ 1914—1918 ('The Great War for Civilisation, 1914–1918') around the edge, and in the centre a list of the Allied nations, under the title ΣΥΜΜΑΧΟΙ ΚΑΙ ΕΤΑΙΡΟΙ ('Allies and Partners'). It was widely awarded to Greek military personnel that fought for at least three months, or was wounded in action, not only in the First World War, but also in the Allies' Southern Russia intervention, and the Greco-Turkish War of 1919–1922.

== International award ==
Inter-Allied Victory Medal by Country
Country	Designer	Manufacturer	Number issued	Obverse	Reverse	Established by
Belgium	Paul Du Bois (1859–1938)	-----	300,000–350,000			Royal Decree from 15 July 1919
Brazil	Jorge Soubre (1890–1934)	Casa da Moeda - Rio de Janeiro	approximately 2,500			Decree nr. 16074 from 22 June 1923
Cuba	Charles Charles	Etablissements Chobillon	6,000–7,000			Decree nr. 905 from 10 June 1922
Czechoslovakia	Otakar Španiel (1881–1955)	Kremnice Mint	approximately 89,500			Decree from 27 July 1920
France	Pierre-Alexandre Morlon (1878–1951)	Monnaie de Paris	approximately 2,000,000			Law from 20 July 1922
France	Charles Charles (Note: Unofficial type.)	Etablissements Chobillon	-----			Law from 20 July 1922
France	M. Pautot and Louis Octave Mattei	-----	-----			Law from 20 July 1922
Greece	Henry-Eugène Nocq (1868–1944)	V. Canale	approximately 200,000			Law from 22 September 1920
Italy	Gaetano Orsolini (1884–1954)	Sacchini-Milano; S.Johnson-Milano; F.M.Lorioli & Castelli-Milano	approximately 2,000,000			Royal Decree nr. 1918 from 16 December 1920
Japan (Note: On the obverse the winged figure of Victory was replaced by Takemikazuchi, the war god in Japanese mythology.)	Shokichi Hata	Osaka Mint	approximately 700,000			Imperial Edict nr 406 from 17 September 1920
Poland (Note: For reasons still not known, Poland did not proceed with the manufacture of the medal at their mint. The medal shows a clearly visible “MK” (Mint Kremnica). The medal may possibly be an unofficial strike by a veterans’ group.)	.... Vlaitov	Mint Kremnica	-----			
Portugal	João Da Silva (1880–1960)	Da Costa	approximately 100,000			Decree from 15 July 1919
Romania	Constantin Kristescu (1871–1928)	La Maison Arthus-Bertrand	approximately 300,000			Royal Decree nr 3390 from 20 July 1921
Siam (Thailand)	Itthithepsan Kritakara (1890–1935)	-----	approximately 1,500			
South Africa (Note: The text on the reverse is in English and Dutch.)	William McMillan (1887–1977)	Woolwich Arsenal	approximately 75,000			Decree from 1 September 1919
United Kingdom (Note: Awarded not only to British combatants but as well to those from the dominions of Canada, Australia, New Zealand and those from the Empire of India.)	William McMillan (1887–1977)	Woolwich Arsenal; Wright & Son	6,334,522 plus			Decree from 1 September 1919
United States	James Earle Fraser (1876–1953)	Arts Metal Works Inc.; S.G.Adams Stamp & Stationary Co.; Jos. Mayer Inc.	approximately 2,500,000			General Order nr 48 from 9 April 1919 of the Department of War
Source unless otherwise indicated: Alexander J. Laslo (1986). The Interallied Victory Medals of World War I. Albuquerque: Dorado Publishing. ISBN 0961732008. Notes

== Sources ==
- George J. Beldecos, "Hellenic Orders, Decorations and Medals", pub. Hellenic War Museum, Athens 1991, ISBN 960-85054-0-2.
- Papadakis, V. P. (1934). "Παράσημα" [Decorations]. Μεγάλη Ἐλληνικὴ Ἐγκυκλοπαιδεῖα, Τόμος Δέκατος. Ἑλλάς – Ἑλληνισμὸς (in Greek). Athens: Pyrsos Co. Ltd. pp. 243–244.
