= Victory Medal (United Kingdom) =

British WW1 service medal

Victory Medal 1914–19
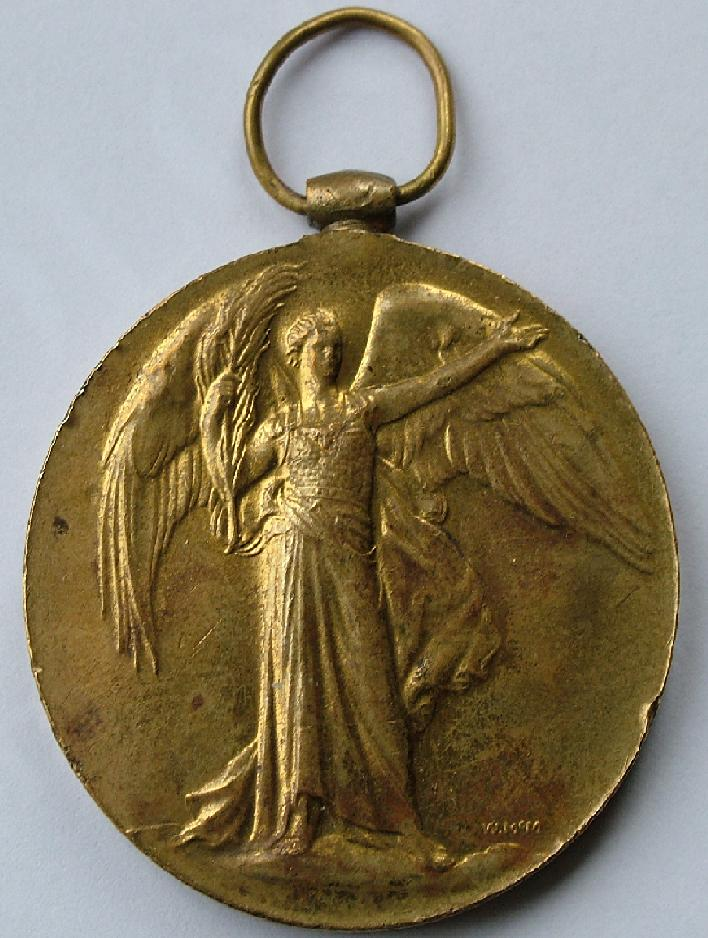
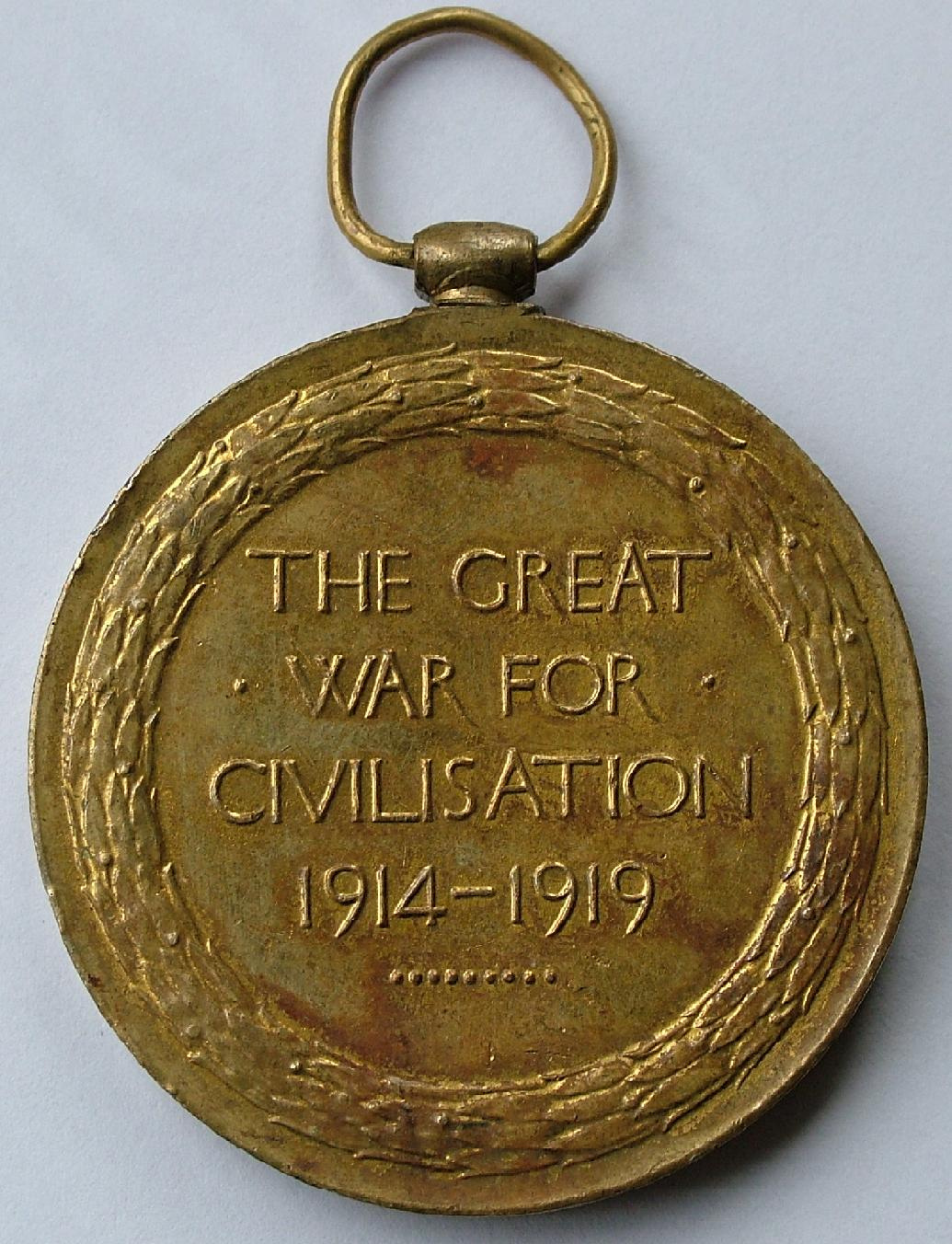
- Obverse and reverse of the medal
- Type: Campaign medal
- Awarded for: Campaign service.
- Description: Bronze disk, 36mm diameter.
- Presented by: United Kingdom / British Empire
- Eligibility: British and Imperial forces.
- Campaign: First World War 1914–1920
- Clasps: None
- Established: 1 September 1919

Highlights
- Total: Circa 5,725,000
- Ribbon bar Ribbon bar with mention in despatches emblem

Precedence
- Equivalent: Victory Medal (South Africa)
- Related: 1914 Star; 1914–15 Star; British War Medal; Territorial Force War Medal

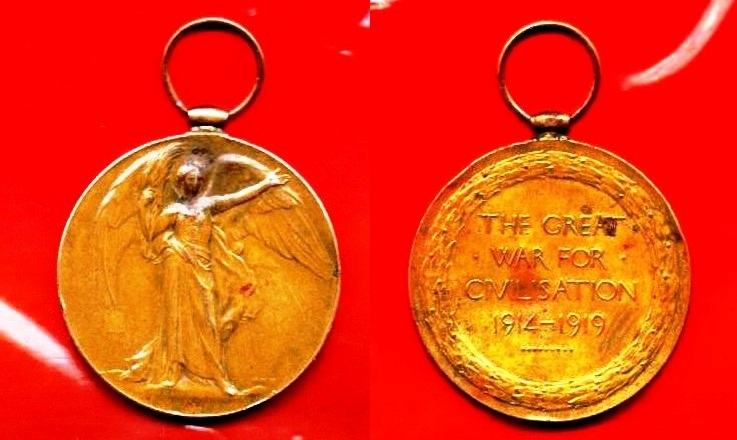
Victory Medal awarded to Late Kripamay Bose, of Beliatore, West Bengal, India

The Victory Medal (also called the Inter-Allied Victory Medal) is a United Kingdom and British Empire First World War campaign medal.

The award of a common allied campaign medal was recommended by an inter-allied committee in March 1919. Each allied nation would design a 'Victory Medal' for award to their own nationals, all issues having certain common features, including a winged figure of victory on the obverse and the same ribbon. Fourteen countries finally awarded the medal.

== Eligibility ==
The Victory Medal (UK and Ireland) was issued to all those who received the 1914 Star or the 1914–15 Star, and to most of those who were awarded the British War Medal. It was not awarded singly.

To qualify, recipients needed to have served in the British or Imperial armed forces, or with certain recognised voluntary organisations, and have entered any theatre of war between 5 August 1914 and 11 November 1918. While home service did not count, United Kingdom based members of the RAF who were actively engaged in the air against the enemy did qualify, as did those who flew new planes to France. Women qualified for this and other First World War campaign medals while serving in nursing and auxiliary forces in a theatre of war.

It was also awarded for mine clearance in the North Sea between 11 November 1918 and 30 November 1919 and for participation in the Allied intervention in the Russian Civil War up to 1 July 1920.

== Description ==
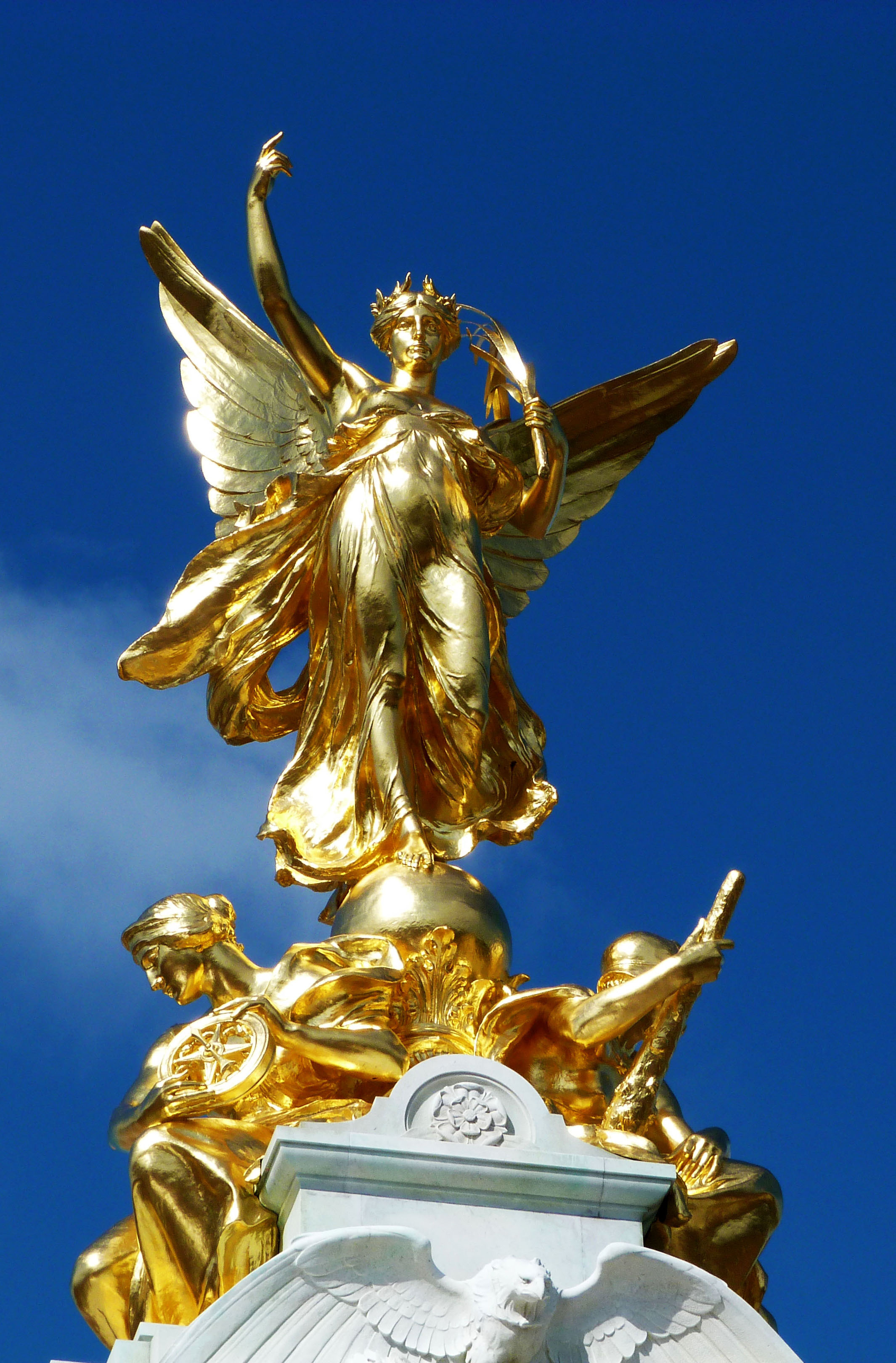
Winged Victory statue, Victoria Memorial, London

- The medal is bronze, circular and 36 millimetres (1.4 in) in diameter. While originally to be of dull bronze, the final award had a clear lacquer coating, giving it a bright finish. It was designed by William McMillan.

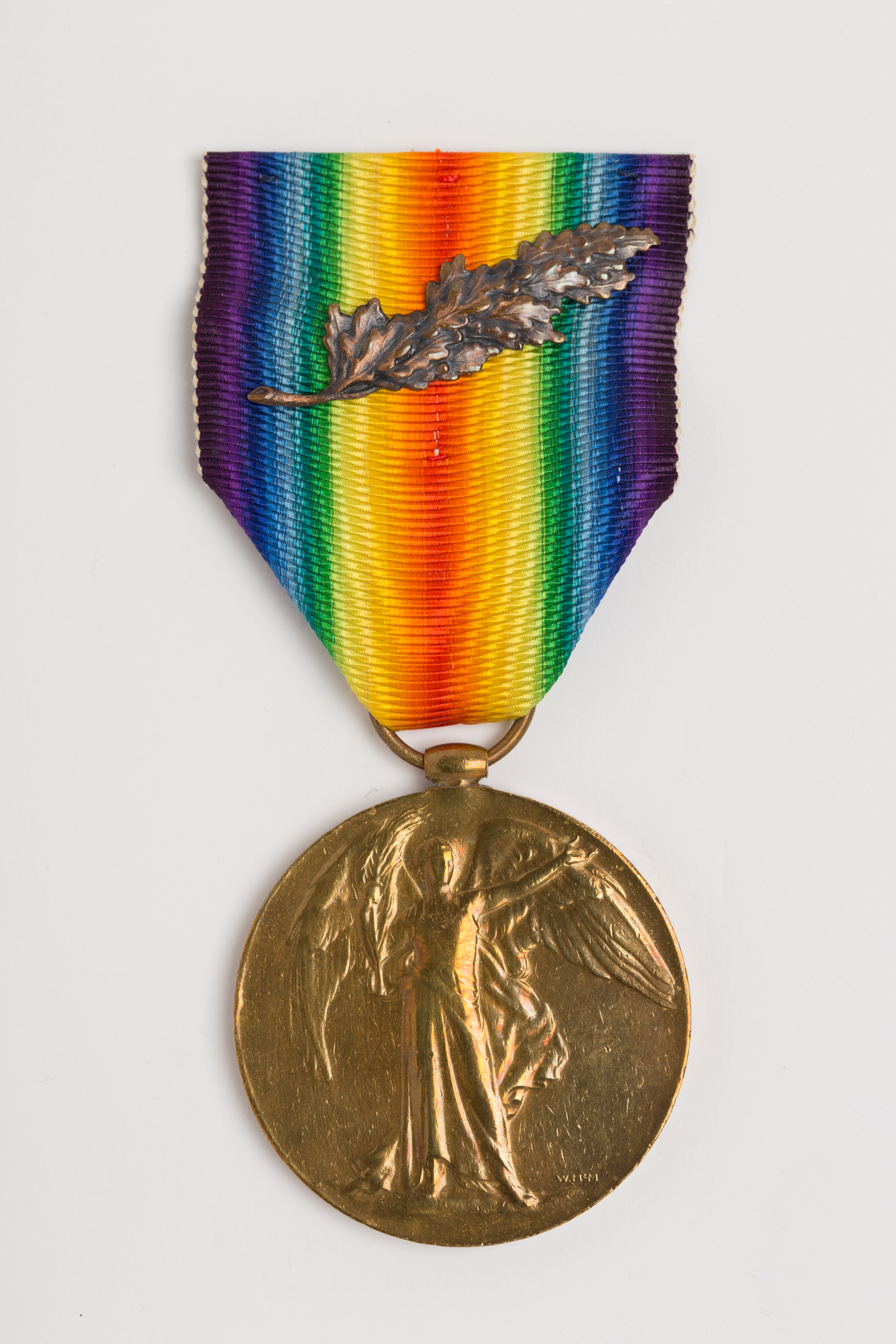
Obverse of the medal, with ribbon.

- The obverse shows the winged, full-length, full-front, figure of 'Victory' (or 'Victoria') with her left arm extended and holding a palm branch in her right hand, similar to the statue surmounting the Queen Victoria Memorial, in front of Buckingham Palace in London.
- The reverse has the words "THE GREAT / WAR FOR / CIVILISATION / 1914–1919" in four lines, all surrounded by a laurel wreath.
- The 39 millimetres (1.5 in) wide watered ribbon has an iridescent colour scheme, with the violet moving through to a central red stripe where both schemes meet. It attaches to the medal through a ring suspender.
- The recipient's name, rank, service number and unit were impressed on the edge of the medal. The name of the regiment or corps was omitted on medals awarded to Army officers.
- Those mentioned in despatches between 4 August 1914 and 10 August 1920 wear a bronze oak leaf spray on the medal's ribbon, with a smaller version on the ribbon bar when medals were not worn.

== Nicknames ==
The three First World War medals, either one of the 1914 Star or the 1914–15 Star, the British War Medal and the Victory Medal, were collectively irreverently referred to as Pip, Squeak and Wilfred, after three comic strip characters, a dog, a penguin and a rabbit, which were popular in the immediate post-war era. Pip represented either of the two Stars, Squeak represented the British War Medal and Wilfred represented the Victory Medal.

When only the British War Medal and Victory Medal were worn together, they were referred to as Mutt and Jeff, after contemporary newspaper comic strip characters.

== Order of wear ==
The order of wear of medals awarded for service during the First World War is as follows:

- 1914 Star
- 1914–15 Star
- British War Medal
- Mercantile Marine War Medal
- Victory Medal
- Territorial Force War Medal

== International award ==
In March 1919 a committee in Paris comprising representatives from the various allied powers recommended the award of an inter-allied campaign medal of common design, thereby avoiding the need for allied nations to exchange campaign medals. Each allied country designed its own version, following certain common criteria. The medal was to be in bronze with a 36 mm diameter, having a winged figure of victory on the obverse, a common inscription on the reverse and suspension by a double rainbow design ribbon. Japan and Siam replaced the figure of victory, since a winged victory symbol was not culturally relevant.

The following versions were finally awarded:

Inter-Allied Victory Medal by Country
Country	Designer	Manufacturer	Number issued	Obverse	Reverse	Established by
Belgium	Paul Du Bois (1859–1938)	-----	300,000–350,000			Royal Decree from 15 July 1919
Brazil	Jorge Soubre (1890–1934)	Casa da Moeda - Rio de Janeiro	approximately 2,500			Decree nr. 16074 from 22 June 1923
Cuba	Charles Charles	Etablissements Chobillon	6,000–7,000			Decree nr. 905 from 10 June 1922
Czechoslovakia	Otakar Španiel (1881–1955)	Kremnice Mint	approximately 89,500			Decree from 27 July 1920
France	Pierre-Alexandre Morlon (1878–1951)	Monnaie de Paris	approximately 2,000,000			Law from 20 July 1922
France	Charles Charles (Note: Unofficial type.)	Etablissements Chobillon	-----			Law from 20 July 1922
France	M. Pautot and Louis Octave Mattei	-----	-----			Law from 20 July 1922
Greece	Henry-Eugène Nocq (1868–1944)	V. Canale	approximately 200,000			Law from 22 September 1920
Italy	Gaetano Orsolini (1884–1954)	Sacchini-Milano; S.Johnson-Milano; F.M.Lorioli & Castelli-Milano	approximately 2,000,000			Royal Decree nr. 1918 from 16 December 1920
Japan (Note: On the obverse the winged figure of Victory was replaced by Takemikazuchi, the war god in Japanese mythology.)	Shokichi Hata	Osaka Mint	approximately 700,000			Imperial Edict nr 406 from 17 September 1920
Poland (Note: For reasons still not known, Poland did not proceed with the manufacture of the medal at their mint. The medal shows a clearly visible “MK” (Mint Kremnica). The medal may possibly be an unofficial strike by a veterans’ group.)	.... Vlaitov	Mint Kremnica	-----			
Portugal	João Da Silva (1880–1960)	Da Costa	approximately 100,000			Decree from 15 July 1919
Romania	Constantin Kristescu (1871–1928)	La Maison Arthus-Bertrand	approximately 300,000			Royal Decree nr 3390 from 20 July 1921
Siam (Thailand) (Note: On the obverse the winged figure of Victory was replaced by Narayana (Vishnu), the Hindu god of preservation and protector of the universe.)	Itthithepsan Kritakara (1890–1935)	-----	approximately 1,500			
South Africa (Note: The text on the reverse is in English and Dutch.)	William McMillan (1887–1977)	Woolwich Arsenal	approximately 75,000			Decree from 1 September 1919
United Kingdom (Note: Awarded not only to British combatants but as well to those from the dominions of Canada, Australia, New Zealand and those from the Empire of India.)	William McMillan (1887–1977)	Woolwich Arsenal; Wright & Son	6,334,522 plus			Decree from 1 September 1919
United States	James Earle Fraser (1876–1953)	Arts Metal Works Inc.; S.G.Adams Stamp & Stationary Co.; Jos. Mayer Inc.	approximately 2,500,000			General Order nr 48 from 9 April 1919 of the Department of War
Source unless otherwise indicated: Alexander J. Laslo (1986). The Interallied Victory Medals of World War I. Albuquerque: Dorado Publishing. ISBN 0961732008. Notes

== See also ==
- Australian campaign medals
- British campaign medals
- New Zealand campaign medals
- Silver War Badge (SWB)

== Bibliography ==
- Dorling, H. Taprell (1956). Ribbons and Medals. London: A.H.Baldwin & Sons. OCLC 930416375.
- Hayward; Birch; Bishop (2006). British Battles and Medals (7th ed.). London: Spink. pp. 508–511. ISBN 1-902040-77-5.
- Mussell, John, ed. (20 September 2014). Medal Yearbook 2015. Honiton, Devon: Token Publishing Ltd. p. 177. ISBN 978-1-908828-17-0.
- Williamson, Howard J. (2011). The Great War Medal Collectors Companion Volume I. Privately published by Anne Williamson. ISBN 978-0-9527544-4-2.
