= 1914–1918 Inter-Allied Victory medal =

French commemorative medal

1914–1918 Inter-Allied Victory medal (France)
- Obverse and reverse of the 1914–1918 Inter-Allied Victory medal
- Type: Commemorative Medal
- Awarded for: Participation in World War I
- Presented by: France
- Eligibility: Allied military forces, and attached civilians
- Status: No longer awarded
- Established: 20 July 1922
- Ribbon of the 1914–1918 Inter-Allied Victory medal

Precedence
- Next (higher): Médaille commémorative du Maroc (1909)
- Next (lower): Médaille commémorative de la bataille de Verdun
- Related: Médaille commémorative de la guerre 1914–1918

The 1914–1918 Inter-Allied Victory medal (French: "Médaille Interalliée de la Victoire 1914–1918") was a French commemorative medal established on 20 July 1922. It was the French version of a common allied campaign medal where each allied nation issued a Victory Medal to their own nationals, all issues having certain common features, including the same ribbon, a winged figure of victory on the obverse and a similar inscription on the reverse, the French version reading "LA GRANDE GVERRE POUR LA CIVILISATION 1914-1918".

It was awarded to all soldiers who served three months, consecutive or not, between 2 August 1914 and 11 November 1918 in the war zone. It was also awarded to civilian nurses, aliens (civilian or military) who served directly under French command, marshals and generals who had a command for at least three months, prisoners of war from Alsace and Lorraine who then served in the French forces. Article 10 of the establishing law states: "The right to the medal is also granted to soldiers who were killed by the enemy or died from wounds of war and those (....) who died of disease or injury incurred in service." The next of kin of those killed or died were required to procure the medal at their own expense.

== International award ==
In response to a proposal first made by the French Marshal Ferdinand Foch, supreme commander of the Allied Forces during the First World War, most allied nations issued a Victory Medal following a common design, thereby avoiding any need for countries to exchange campaign medals. Each country produced their own version, following certain common criteria. The medal was to be in bronze with a 36 mm diameter, having a winged figure of victory on the obverse, a common inscription on the reverse and suspension by a double rainbow design ribbon. Japan and Siam replaced the figure of victory, since a winged victory symbol was not culturally relevant.

At the start of the war in 1914, the countries of Poland and Czechoslovakia were parts of the Russian and Austro-Hungarian Empires respectively. The following versions were finally awarded:

Inter-Allied Victory Medal by Country
Country	Designer	Manufacturer	Number issued	Obverse	Reverse	Established by
Belgium	Paul Du Bois (1859–1938)	-----	300,000–350,000			Royal Decree from 15 July 1919
Brazil	Jorge Soubre (1890–1934)	Casa da Moeda - Rio de Janeiro	approximately 2,500			Decree nr. 16074 from 22 June 1923
Cuba	Charles Charles	Etablissements Chobillon	6,000–7,000			Decree nr. 905 from 10 June 1922
Czechoslovakia	Otakar Španiel (1881–1955)	Kremnice Mint	approximately 89,500			Decree from 27 July 1920
France	Pierre-Alexandre Morlon (1878–1951)	Monnaie de Paris	approximately 2,000,000			Law from 20 July 1922
France	Charles Charles (Note: Unofficial type.)	Etablissements Chobillon	-----			Law from 20 July 1922
France	M. Pautot and Louis Octave Mattei	-----	-----			Law from 20 July 1922
Greece	Henry-Eugène Nocq (1868–1944)	V. Canale	approximately 200,000			Law from 22 September 1920
Italy	Gaetano Orsolini (1884–1954)	Sacchini-Milano; S.Johnson-Milano; F.M.Lorioli & Castelli-Milano	approximately 2,000,000			Royal Decree nr. 1918 from 16 December 1920
Japan (Note: On the obverse the winged figure of Victory was replaced by Takemikazuchi, the war god in Japanese mythology.)	Shokichi Hata	Osaka Mint	approximately 700,000			Imperial Edict nr 406 from 17 September 1920
Poland (Note: For reasons still not known, Poland did not proceed with the manufacture of the medal at their mint. The medal shows a clearly visible “MK” (Mint Kremnica). The medal may possibly be an unofficial strike by a veterans’ group.)	.... Vlaitov	Mint Kremnica	-----			
Portugal	João Da Silva (1880–1960)	Da Costa	approximately 100,000			Decree from 15 July 1919
Romania	Constantin Kristescu (1871–1928)	La Maison Arthus-Bertrand	approximately 300,000			Royal Decree nr 3390 from 20 July 1921
Siam (Thailand) (Note: On the obverse the winged figure of Victory was replaced by Narayana (Vishnu), the Hindu god of preservation and protector of the universe.)	Itthithepsan Kritakara (1890–1935)	-----	approximately 1,500			
South Africa (Note: The text on the reverse is in English and Dutch.)	William McMillan (1887–1977)	Woolwich Arsenal	approximately 75,000			Decree from 1 September 1919
United Kingdom (Note: Awarded not only to British combatants but as well to those from the dominions of Canada, Australia, New Zealand and those from the Empire of India.)	William McMillan (1887–1977)	Woolwich Arsenal; Wright & Son	6,334,522 plus			Decree from 1 September 1919
United States	James Earle Fraser (1876–1953)	Arts Metal Works Inc.; S.G.Adams Stamp & Stationary Co.; Jos. Mayer Inc.	approximately 2,500,000			General Order nr 48 from 9 April 1919 of the Department of War
Source unless otherwise indicated: Alexander J. Laslo (1986). The Interallied Victory Medals of World War I. Albuquerque: Dorado Publishing. ISBN 0961732008. Notes

== Award certificate ==
A certificate confirming the award was given to each recipient confirming his right to wear the medal.

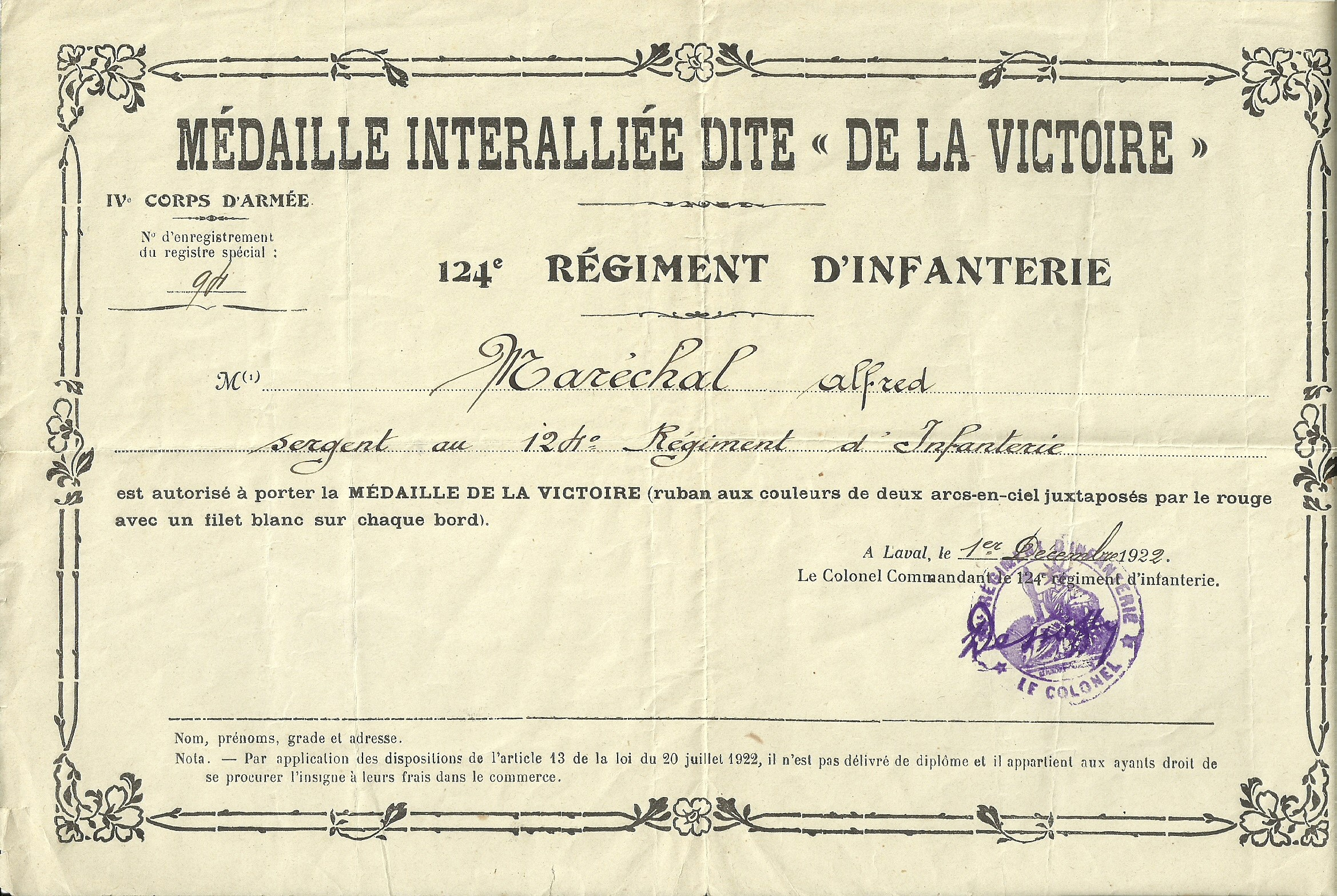
Certificate confirming the award of the inter-allied victory medal

== See also ==
- Allied Victory Medal
- French medals for the First World War
- Orient campaign medal: WWI French campaign medal for the Macedonian front
- Marne Medal: WWI French campaign medal for the First and Second Battles of the Marne
- Dardanelles campaign medal: WWI French campaign medal for the Gallipoli campaign
