= World War I Victory Medal (United States) =

US military decoration

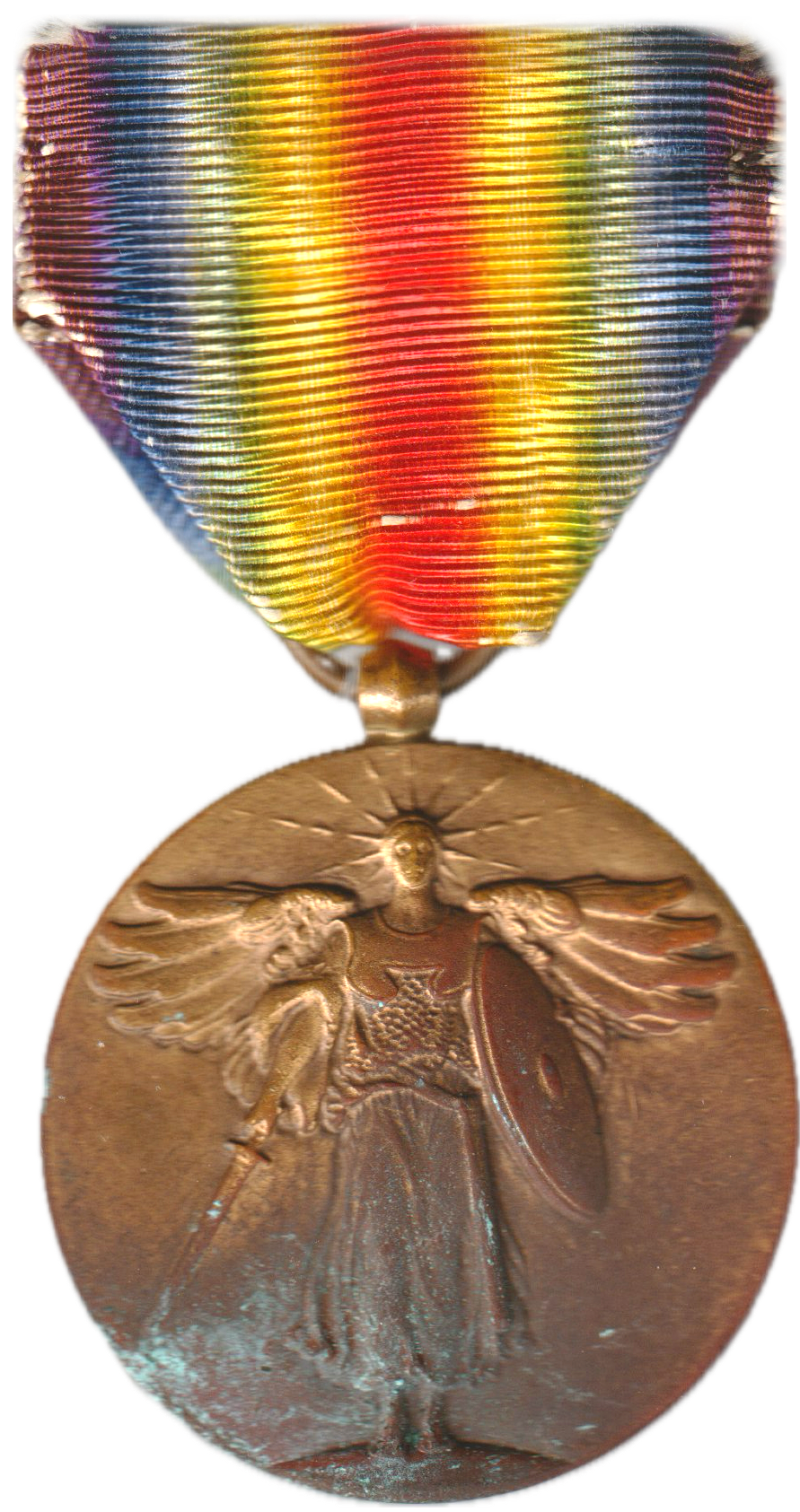
- Obverse
- Type: Military medal Service medal
- Awarded for: "service between April 6, 1917, and November 11, 1918, or with either of the following expeditions: American Expeditionary Forces in European Russia between November 12, 1918, and August 5, 1919.; American Expeditionary Forces Siberia between November 23, 1918, and April 1, 1920."
- Description: A medal of bronze 36 millimeters in diameter. On the obverse is a winged Victory standing full length and full face. On the reverse is the inscription The Great War for Civilization and the coat of arms for the United States surmounted by a fasces, and on either side the names of the Allied and Associated Nations. The medal is suspended by a ring from a silk moire ribbon 1 3/8 inches in length and 36 millimeters in width, composed of two rainbows placed in juxtaposition and having the red in the middle, with a white thread along each edge.
- Country: United States
- Presented by: Secretary of War and Secretary of the Navy
- Eligibility: Military personnel only
- Motto: The Great War for Civilization
- Status: Obsolete
- Established: 1919; 107 years ago
- Service ribbon and campaign streamer

Precedence
- Next (higher): Mexican Border Service Medal
- Next (lower): Army of Occupation of Germany Medal

The World War I Victory Medal (known prior to establishment of the World War II Victory Medal in 1945 simply as the Victory Medal) was a United States service medal designed by James Earle Fraser of New York City under the direction of the Commission of Fine Arts.

Award of a common allied service medal was recommended by an inter-allied committee in March 1919. Each allied nation would design a 'Victory Medal' for award to their military personnel, all issues having certain common features, including a winged figure of victory on the obverse and the same ribbon.

The Victory Medal was originally intended to be established by an act of Congress. The bill authorizing the medal never passed, however, thus leaving the military departments to establish it through general orders. The War Department published orders in April 1919, and the Navy in June of the same year.

== Criteria ==
The Victory Medal was awarded to military personnel for service between April 6, 1917, and November 11, 1918, or with either of the following expeditions:

- American Expeditionary Forces in European Russia between November 12, 1918, and August 5, 1919.
- American Expeditionary Forces Siberia between November 23, 1918, and April 1, 1920.

== Design ==
The front of the bronze medal features a winged Victory holding a shield and sword on the front. The back of the bronze medal features "The Great War For Civilization" in all capital letters curved along the top of the medal. Curved along the bottom of the back of the medal are six stars, three on either side of the double-headed fasces in the center, which sits in front of a shield emblazoned with the letters "US." On left side of the medal it lists one World War I Allied country per line: France, Italy, Serbia, Japan, Montenegro, Russia, and Greece. On the right side of the medal, the Allied country names read: Great Britain, Belgium, Brazil, Portugal, Rumania (spelled with a U instead of an O as it is spelled now), and China.

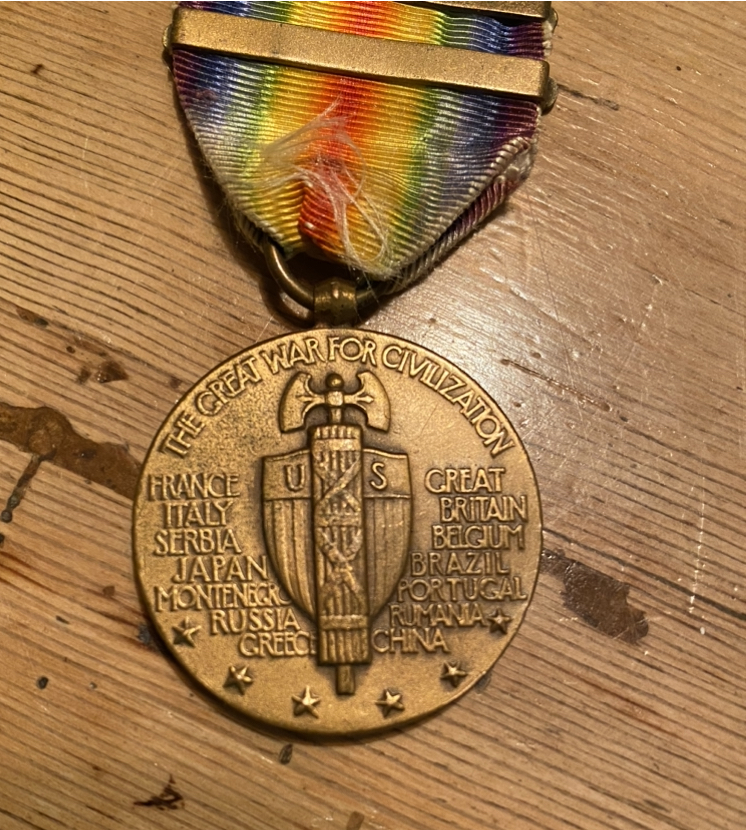
Back of the medal

== Devices ==
To denote battle participation and campaign credit, the World War I Victory Medal was authorized with a large variety of devices to denote specific accomplishments. In order of seniority, the devices authorized to the World War I Victory Medal were as follows:

=== Citation Star ===
The Citation Star to the World War I Victory Medal was authorized by the United States Congress on February 4, 1919. A 3/16 inch silver star was authorized to be worn on the ribbon of the Victory Medal for any member of the U.S. Army who had been cited for gallantry in action between 1917 and 1920. In 1932, the Citation Star ("Silver Star") was redesigned and renamed the Silver Star Medal and, upon application to the United States War Department, any holder of the Silver Star Citation could have it converted to a Silver Star medal.

=== Navy Commendation Star ===
The Navy Commendation Star to the World War I Victory Medal was authorized to any person who had been commended by the Secretary of the Navy for performance of duty during the First World War. A 3/16 inch silver star was worn on the World War I Victory Medal, identical in appearance to the Army's Citation Star. Unlike the Army's version, however, the Navy Commendation Star could not be upgraded to the Silver Star medal.

=== Army Battle Clasps ===
The following battle clasps, inscribed with a battle's name, were worn on the medal to denote participation in major ground conflicts.

Army Battle Clasps
Major Ground Conflict	Start Date	End Date
Aisne	May 27, 1918	June 5, 1918
Aisne-Marne	July 18, 1918	August 6, 1918
Cambrai	May 12, 1917	December 4, 1917
Champagne-Marne	July 15, 1918	July 18, 1918
Lys	April 9, 1918	April 27, 1918
Meuse-Argonne	September 26, 1918	November 11, 1918
Montdidier-Noyon	June 9, 1918	June 13, 1918
Oise-Aisne	August 18, 1918	November 11, 1918
St. Mihiel	September 12, 1918	September 16, 1918
Somme-Defensive	March 21, 1918	April 6, 1918
Somme-Offensive	August 8, 1918	November 11, 1918
Vittorio-Veneto	October 24, 1918	November 4, 1918
Ypres-Lys	August 19, 1918	November 11, 1918

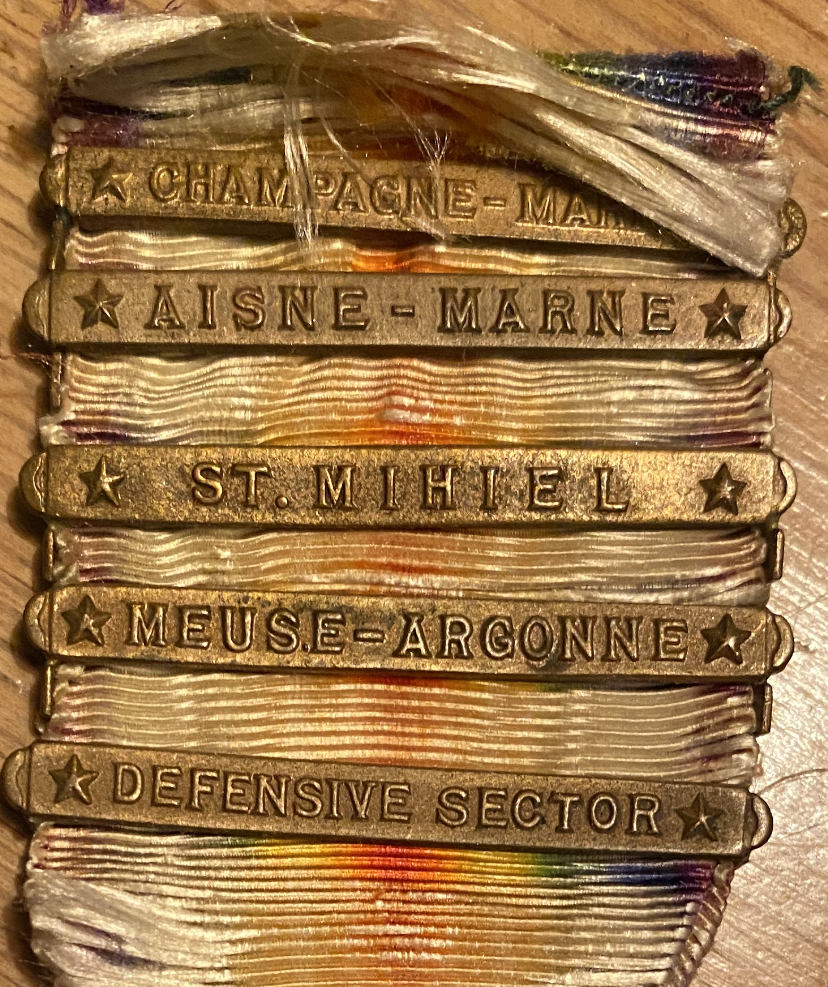
Four of the thirteen major ground conflicts

For general defense service, not involving a specific battle, the "Defensive Sector" Battle Clasp was authorized. The clasp was also awarded for any battle which was not already recognized by its own battle clasp.

The World War I Victory Medal bears the clasps of the battles the U.S. Army participated in across the ribbon. Not all battles are shown on the bar clasps. Only the battles designated as battles that would have bars issued were shown on the medal. The famous Battle of Chateau Thierry to hold the Chateau and the bridge as a joint effort between the US Army and the US Marines against the German machine gunners did not get awarded clasps.

As commander of the American Expeditionary Forces, General John J. Pershing received all 14 clasps. His medal is in the National Museum of American History.

=== Navy Battle Clasps ===
Navy battle clasps were issued for naval service in support of Army operations and had identical names to the Army battle clasps. There was a slight variation of the criteria dates for the Navy battle clasps, as listed below.

Navy Battle Clasps
Major Ground Conflict	Start Date	End Date
Aisne	June 1, 1918	June 5, 1918
Aisne-Marne	July 18, 1918	July 20, 1918
Meuse-Argonne	September 29, 1918	October 10, 1918
Meuse-Argonne	October 25, 1918	November 11, 1918
St. Mihiel	September 12, 1918	September 16, 1918
Ypres-Lys (Service in support of the Northern Bombing Group)

The Defensive Sector Clasp was also authorized for Navy personnel who had participated in naval combat but were not authorized a particular battle clasp.

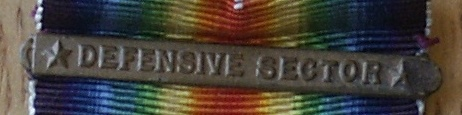
Defensive Sector Clasp on Ribbon

=== Navy Operational Clasps ===
For sea-related war duty, the Navy issued the following operational clasps, which were worn on the World War I Victory Medal and inscribed with the name of the duty type which had been performed. Clasps for Navy and Marine Corps personnel are rectangular bronze bars with a stylized rope border measuring 1/4 x 1 1/2 inches.

Navy Operational Clasps
Operation	Start Date	End Date
Armed Guard: Merchant personnel (freighters, tankers, and troop ship)	April 6, 1917	November 11, 1918
Asiatic: Service on any vessel that visited a Siberian port	April 6, 1917	November 11, 1918
Asiatic: Port visit must have exceeded ten days in length	November 12, 1918	March 30, 1920
Atlantic Fleet: Service in the Atlantic Fleet	May 25, 1918	November 11, 1918
Aviation: Service involving flying over the Atlantic Ocean	May 25, 1918	November 11, 1918
Destroyer: Service on destroyers on the Atlantic Ocean	May 25, 1918	November 11, 1918
Escort: Personnel regularly attached to escort vessels on the North Atlantic	April 6, 1917	November 11, 1918
Grand Fleet: Personnel assigned to any ship of the "United States Grand Fleet"	December 9, 1917	November 11, 1918
Mine Laying: Service in mine laying sea duty	May 26, 1918	November 11, 1918
Mine Sweeping: Service in mine sweeping sea duty	April 6, 1917	November 11, 1918
Mobile Base: Service on tenders and repair vessels	April 6, 1917	November 11, 1918
Naval Battery: Service as a member of a naval battery detachment	July 10, 1918	November 11, 1918
Overseas: Service on shore in allied or enemy countries of Europe	April 6, 1917	November 11, 1918
Patrol: War patrol service on the Atlantic Ocean	May 25, 1918	November 11, 1918
Salvage: Salvage duty performed on the seas	April 6, 1917	November 11, 1918
Submarine: Submarine duty performed on the Atlantic Ocean	May 25,1918	November 11, 1918
Submarine Chaser: Anti-submarine duty performed on the Atlantic Ocean	May 18, 1918	November 11, 1918
Transport: Personnel regularly attached to a transport or cargo vessel	April 6, 1917	November 11, 1918
White Sea: Service on any vessel which visited a Russian port or war patrols in the White Sea not less than ten days	November 12, 1918	July 31, 1919

Unlike the army, the navy only allowed one clasp of any type to be worn on the ribbon. Members of the marine or medical corps who served in France but was not eligible for a battle clasp would receive a bronze Maltese cross on their ribbons.

=== Army Service Clasps ===
For non-combat service with the army during the First World War, the following service clasps were authorized to be worn with the World War I Victory Medal. Each service clasp was inscribed with a country or region name where support service was performed. The U.S. Army issued the following service clasps:

Army Service Clasps
Country or Region	Start Date	End Date
England	April 6, 1917	November 11, 1918
France	April 6, 1917	November 11, 1918
Italy	April 6, 1917	November 11, 1918
Russia	November 12, 1918	August 5, 1919
Siberia	November 23, 1918	April 1, 1920

=== Navy Service Clasps ===
The U.S. Navy issued similar service clasps to the Army for service in the following regions during the following periods:

Navy Service Clasps
Region	Start Date	End Date
England	April 6, 1917	November 11, 1918
France	April 6, 1917	November 11, 1918
Italy	April 6, 1917	November 11, 1918
Russia	November 12, 1918	July 31, 1919
Siberia	November 12, 1918	March 30, 1920
West Indies	April 6, 1917	November 11, 1918

=== Campaign Stars ===
Maltese Cross device

Since battle and service clasps could only be worn on the full-sized World War I Victory Medal, 3/16 inch bronze service stars were authorized for wear on the award ribbon. This was the common method of campaign and battle display when wearing the World War I Victory Medal as a ribbon on a military uniform.

=== Maltese Cross ===
Medals issued to U.S. Marines were issued with a Maltese cross device affixed to the ribbon.

== Lapel button ==
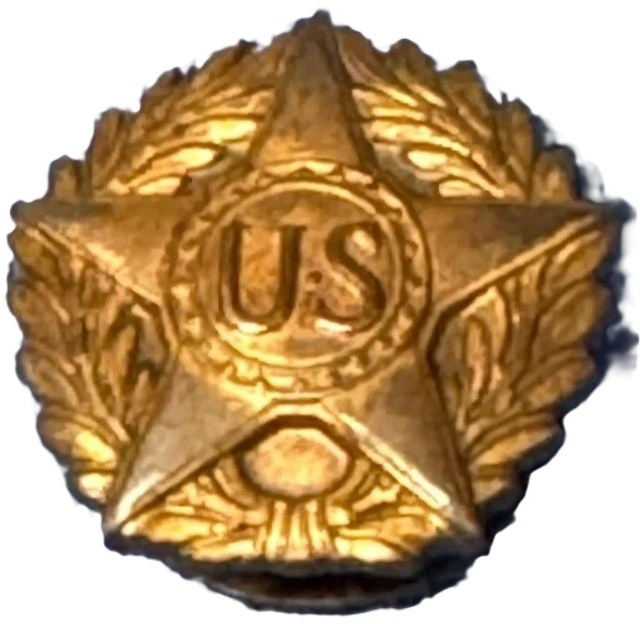
World War I Victory Button

The World War I Victory Button (known prior to establishment of the World War II Victory Medal simply as the Victory Button) was a lapel button designed for wear on civilian clothes and consisted of a five-pointed star 5/8-inch in diameter on a wreath with the letters "U.S." in the center. For persons wounded in action, the lapel button was silver; for all others, the lapel button was bronze. The Victory Button was designed by the sculptor, Adolph Alexander Weinman of New York City under the supervision of the Commission of Fine Arts.

The World War I Victory Button on a narrow circular band of blue enamel, containing the words "American Legion" in gold letters, forms the central element of the American Legion emblem. It was adopted by the National Executive Committee of the American Legion on July 9, 1919, as the official insignia of the national organization of American veterans.

== Distribution ==
The World War I Victory Medals were awarded after the end of World War I, so they were mailed to the servicemen instead of awarded in person. For example, the boxes containing the Victory Medals for United States Army World War I veterans were mailed out by the depot officer at the General Supply Depot, U.S. Army, in Philadelphia, Pennsylvania, in April 1921. An outer light brown box with an address label glued to it and its postage area marked "OFFICIAL BUSINESS, Penalty for private use $300" contained an inner white box stamped with the bars the serviceman was supposed to receive on his medal. The inner white box contained the medal, which was wrapped in tissue paper.

Only after filling out the application form A.G.O. No. 740 with the help of an authorized officer could it be officially forwarded to the Philadelphia Quartermaster Intermediate Depot for the veteran then to receive his medal by mail. The Army started issuing Victory Medals on June 21, 1920, not April 1921 as listed above. The Navy had a late start due to production issues and started in August 1920.

== Allied and associated nations ==
Not only did the United States establish a World War I Victory Medal, but so did a significant number of allied and associated nations involved in the conflict against the Dual Alliance between Austria and Germany. The proposition of such a common award was first made by French Maréchal Ferdinand Foch who was supreme commander of the Allied Forces during the First World War. Each bronze Victory Medal has the same diameter (36 mm) and ribbon (double rainbow), but with a national design representing a winged victory. (Note: Except Japan and Siam where the concept of a winged victory was not culturally relevant. Alexander J. Laslo (1986). The Interallied Victory Medals of World War I. Dorado Publishing, Albuquerque.)

Country	Designer	Manufacturer	Number issued
Belgium	Paul Du Bois (1859–1938)	—	300,000–350,000
Brazil	Jorge Soubre (1890–1934)	Casa da Moeda Rio	approximately 2,500
Cuba	Charles Charles	Etablissements Chobillon	6,000–7,000
Czechoslovakia	Otakar Španiel (1881–1955)	Kremnice Mint	approximately 89,500
France	Pierre-Alexandre Morlon (1878–1951)	Monnaie de Paris	approximately 2,000,000
France (Note: Unofficial. Alexander J. Laslo (1986). The Interallied Victory Medals of World War I. Dorado Publishing, Albuquerque.)	Charles Charles	Etablissements Chobillon	—
France	M. Pautot; Louis Octave Mattei	—	—
United Kingdom (Note: Awarded not only to British combatants but as well to those from the dominions of Canada, Australia, Newfoundland, New Zealand and those from the Empire of India. Alexander J. Laslo (1986). The Interallied Victory Medals of World War I. Dorado Publishing, Albuquerque.)	William McMillan (1887–1977)	Woolwich Arsenal; Wright & Son	6,334,522 plus
Greece	Henry-Eugène Nocq (1868–1944)	V. Canale	approximately 200,000
Italy	Gaetano Orsolini (1884–1954)	Sacchini-Milano; S. Johnson-Milano; F. M. Lorioli & Castelli-Milano	approximately 2,000,000
Japan (Note: On the obverse the winged figure of Victory was replaced by a warrior holding a spear. Alexander J. Laslo (1986). The Interallied Victory Medals of World War I. Dorado Publishing, Albuquerque.)	Shoukichi Hata	Osaka Mint	193,300
Poland (Note: For reasons still not known, Poland did not proceed with the manufacture of the medal at their mint. The medal shows a clearly visible "MK" ( Mint Kremnica). The medal may possibly be an unofficial strike by a veteran's group. Alexander J. Laslo (1986). The Interallied Victory Medals of World War I. Dorado Publishing, Albuquerque.)	.... Vlaitov	Mint Kremnica	—
Portugal	João Da Silva (1880–1960)	Da Costa	approximately 100,000
Romania	.... Kristesko	—	approximately 300,000
Siam (Thailand)	Itthithepsan Kritakara (1890–1935)	—	approximately 1,500
South Africa (Note: The text on the reverse is in English and Dutch. Alexander J. Laslo (1986). The Interallied Victory Medals of World War I. Dorado Publishing, Albuquerque.)	William McMillan (1887–1977)	Woolwich Arsenal	approximately 75,000
United States	James Earle Fraser (1876–1953)	Arts Metal Works Inc.; S. G. Adams Stamp & Stationary Co.; Jos. Mayer Inc.	approximately 2,500,000

Main source:

== See also ==
- Awards and decorations of the United States military
- Silver Citation Star
- World War II Victory Medal (United States)
- United States military award devices
