= Victory Medal (South Africa) =

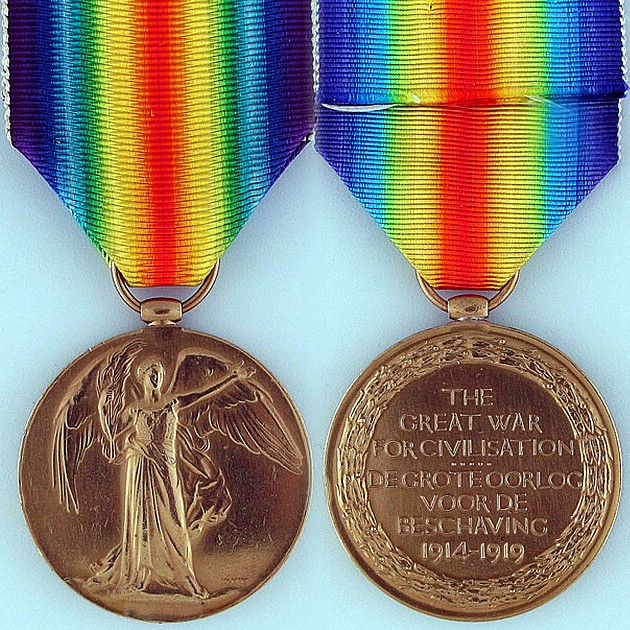
- Type: Military Campaign medal
- Awarded for: Campaign service
- Country: Union of South Africa
- Presented by: the Monarch of the United Kingdom and the British Dominions, and Emperor of India
- Eligibility: South African forces
- Campaigns: First World War, 1914–1919
- Clasps: None
- Established: 1919
- First award: 1919

Highlights
- Total: Approximately 75,000
- Ribbon bars without and with MID emblem

South African order of wear
- Next (higher): Mercantile Marine War Medal
- Next (lower): 1939-1945 Star
- Related: Victory Medal (United Kingdom)

The Victory Medal (South Africa) is the Union of South Africa's version of the Victory Medal (United Kingdom), a First World War campaign medal of Britain and its colonies and dominions. The medal, never awarded singly, was awarded to all those South Africans who were awarded the 1914–15 Star or the British War Medal.

== Institution ==
The Victory Medal, also known as the Inter-Allied Victory Medal, was instituted to celebrate the Allied victory in the Great War, in accordance with a recommendation of an inter-allied committee in March 1919. The award of a similar medal to their own veterans by each allied country was intended to prevent a mass exchange of campaign medals.

The same ribbon and variations of the basic medal design and wording on the reverse were adopted by Belgium, Brazil, Cuba, Czechoslovakia, France, Greece, Italy, Japan, Poland, Portugal, Romania, Siam, South Africa, the United Kingdom and her colonies and dominions and the United States of America. Most of the medals depict the Winged Victory, a female winged figure representing Nike, the mythological Greek goddess of victory. A particular form of Nike or her Roman equivalent Victoria was chosen by each nation for its version of the medal, except by Japan and Siam, where the concept of a winged victory was not culturally relevant. The years of the war were shown as 1914 to 1918 in every case, except on the two medal versions of the British Empire, which show the years 1914 to 1919.

The British version of the Victory Medal was awarded to British combatants as well as to those from the dominions of Canada, Australia, New Zealand, the Empire of India and to colonial forces. The Union of South Africa awarded its own version of the Victory Medal, identical to the British version on the obverse, but with the inscription on the reverse in English and Dutch, the two official languages of South Africa at the time. In precedence, the two versions rank on par.

== Award criteria ==
Recipients had to have entered a theatre of the war between 5 August 1914, the day following the British declaration of war against the German Empire, and the armistice of 11 November 1918, both dates inclusive. The medal was never awarded singly, but to all those who were awarded either the 1914 Star or the 1914–15 Star, or to all of those who were awarded the British War Medal.

The Union Defence Forces served in German South West Africa in 1914 and 1915, while the volunteer South African Overseas Expeditionary Force served in Egypt in 1916, France and Belgium from 1916 to 1918, German East Africa from 1916 to 1918 and Palestine in 1917 and 1918. South African Royal Navy Volunteer Reserve contingents served with the Royal Navy in the Aegean and other theatres of war.

== Description ==
The medal is a bronze disk, 36 millimetres (1.4 in) in diameter, with a clear lacquer coating giving a bright finish. It has the following design:

Obverse

The obverse shows the winged, full-length and full-front figure of Victoria, the Roman equivalent of the Greek goddess Nike, with her left arm extended and holding a palm branch in her right hand.

Reverse

The reverse is inscribed "THE GREAT WAR FOR CIVILISATION" in three lines above and "DE GROTE OORLOG VOOR DE BESCHAVING" in three lines below, with the English and Dutch inscriptions separated by "•••••" and with the years "1914-1919" at the bottom, all completely surrounded by a laurel wreath.

Naming

Each medal was named in impressed capitals.

Ribbon

The ribbon is 38 millimetres (1.5 in) wide and of watered silk, with a double rainbow design, violet at the edges and progressing through the spectrum to red in the centre. It attaches to the medal through a ring suspender.

Clasps

No clasps were issued.

Mentioned in Despatches

Recipients who were mentioned in despatches between 4 August 1914 and 10 August 1920 wore an oak leaf cluster emblem on the medal ribbon, with a smaller version on the ribbon bar when medals were not worn.

== Nicknames ==
The three World War I medals, either one of the 1914 Star or 1914–15 Star, the British War Medal and the Victory Medal, were collectively irreverently referred to as Pip, Squeak and Wilfred, after three comic strip characters, a dog, a penguin and a rabbit, which were popular in the immediate post-war era. Pip represented either of the two Stars, Squeak represented the British War Medal and Wilfred represented the Victory Medal.

Similarly, when only the British War Medal and Victory Medal were awarded, they were referred to as Mutt and Jeff, after contemporary newspaper comic strip characters.

== Order of wear ==
The order of wear of the First World War campaign stars and medals is as follows:

- The 1914 Star.
- The 1914–15 Star.
- The British War Medal.
- The Mercantile Marine War Medal.
- The Victory Medal.
- The Territorial War Medal.

=== South Africa ===
On 6 April 1952 the Union of South Africa instituted its own range of military decorations and medals. These new awards were worn before all earlier British decorations and medals awarded to South Africans, with the exception of the Victoria Cross, which still took precedence before all other awards. Of the First World War campaign medals applicable to South Africans, the Victory Medal takes precedence as shown.

- Preceded by the Mercantile Marine War Medal.
- Succeeded by the 1939-1945 Star.
