= List of awards and honours received by Tomáš Masaryk =

This is a list of awards and honours received by Tomáš Masaryk.

== Scholastic ==
Awards

Location	Date	Institution	Award	Degree
London	1920	British Academy	Fellow of the British Academy	Corresponding Fellow
Paris	1923	Institut de France	Member of the Académie des Sciences Morales et Politiques	Foreign Associate Member
Bucharest	1934	Romanian Academy	Member of the Academy	Corresponding Member from Abroad
Philadelphia	1936	American Philosophical Society	Member of the Society	International Member

Honorary degrees

Location	Date	School	Degree
Prague	1919	Czech Technical University in Prague	Doctorate
Zagreb	1921	University of Zagreb	Doctorate
Prague	24 May 1923	Protestant Theological Faculty – Charles University	Doctorate
Oxford	23 October 1923	University of Oxford	Doctorate
Brno	12 February 1926	Brno University of Technology	Doctorate
Ljubljana	3 March 1930	King Alexander University of Ljubljana	Doctorate

== National orders ==
Award or decoration	Country	Date
Jubilee Military Medal 1898	Austria-Hungary	1898
Military Jubilee Cross	Austria-Hungary	1908
Czechoslovak War Cross 1918	Czechoslovakia	1919
Czechoslovak Revolutionary Medal	Czechoslovakia	1919
Order of the Falcon	Czechoslovakia	1919
Czechoslovak Victory Medal	Czechoslovakia	1922

== Foreign orders ==
Award or decoration	Country	Date
Order of Karađorđe's Star	Yugoslavia	1920
Légion d'honneur	France	1921
Order of Saints Maurice and Lazarus	Kingdom of Italy	1921
Order of Glory	Tunisia	1923
Order of St Michael and St George	United Kingdom	1923
Order of Leopold	Belgium	1923
Order of Carol I	Kingdom of Romania	1927
Commemorative Cross of the 1916–1918 War	Kingdom of Romania	1927
Order of Charles III	Spain	1924
Order of the Elephant	Denmark	1925
Order of the White Eagle	Second Polish Republic	1925
Decoration of Honour for Services to the Republic of Austria	First Austrian Republic	1926
Order of the Redeemer	Greece	1927
Order of the Three Stars	Latvia	1927
Order of the Chrysanthemum	Empire of Japan	1928
Order of Muhammad Ali	Kingdom of Egypt	1928
Order of the Netherlands Lion	Netherlands	1929
Order of the Holy Sepulchre	Holy See	1929
Order of the Cross of Vytis	Lithuania	1930
Order of the White Rose of Finland	Finland	1930
Military Order of Saint James of the Sword	Portugal	1930
Order of the Cross of the Eagle	Estonia	1931
Order of the Spanish Republic	Spanish Republic	1935
Order of the White Elephant	Siam	1935
Order of Boyaca	Colombia	1937
