= Commemorative Cross of the 1916–1918 War =

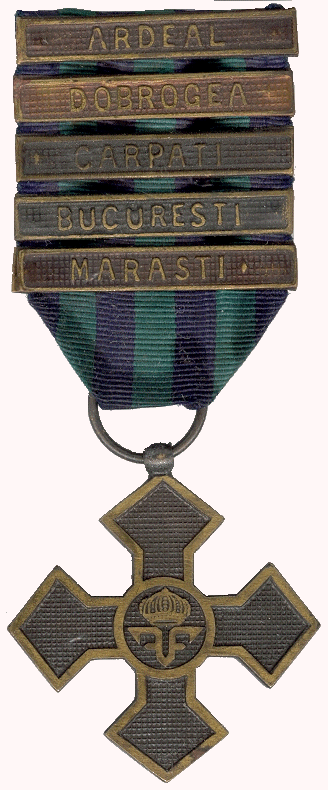
- Obverse of the medal with 5 clasps
- Type: Campaign medal
- Awarded for: Campaign service
- Description: Iron cross, 40mm diameter
- Presented by: Romania
- Eligibility: Romanian Army
- Campaigns: First World War, Hungarian–Romanian War
- Clasps: 17
- Status: out of use
- Established: 8 July 1918
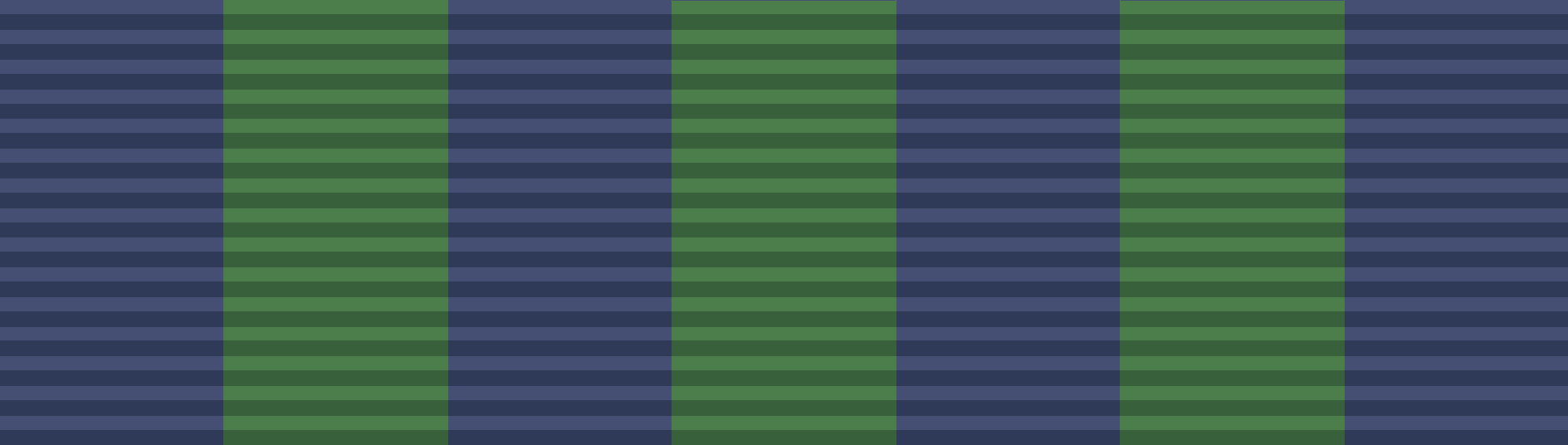
- Ribbon bar

Precedence
- Next (higher): The Country's Momentum
- Next (lower): Victory Medal

The Commemorative Cross of the 1916–1918 War (Romanian: Medalia Crucea Comemorativă a războiului 1916-1918) is a Romanian First World War campaign medal established on 8 July 1918 by Royal Decree. The Decree was amended four times, in 1919, 1920, 1927 and 1939.

== Eligibility ==
To qualify for the Commemorative Cross, recipients, civilians or military personnel of any rank, had to be mobilised for war service on any campaign between 1916 and 1918. This was later extended to 1919, thus being included the combatants from the Hungarian–Romanian War as well.

It was awarded for a lifetime, but it could have been lost if the recipient would have lost his Romanian citizenship, or would have suffered a penal sentence.

While initially the medal was to be used only by the recipient, in 1939 King Carol II of Romania authorised, for superior ranks only, the inheritance of the medal by the eldest son or older brother of the deceased recipient, who would become an active army officer. The inherited medal would receive a new clasp, inscribed Tradiție (tradition), and would have to be confirmed by royal decree

== Description ==
The dark iron cross has a diameter of 40 mm. Each rhombic arm measures 10 mm on the exterior and 7 mm on the interior. In the center of the cross, there is a 13 mm circle. The external borders of the cross and the circle have 1.3 mm. Inside the circle, on the obverse, there is the royal cypher of King Ferdinand I of Romania (two Fs facing away with a royal crown on top), while on the reverse there is inscribed 1916|1918 on the early models and 1916|1919 on later models, in two rows.

The 30 mm ribbon alternates four equal bars of dark blue with three equal bars of green.

== Clasps ==
Seventeen clasps were approved for the medal: eleven in the original Decree from 1918, three in 1919, one in 1920, one in 1927 and one in 1939. These clasps consist of small metal bars into which the name of the relevant campaign or theatre of operations was moulded (except for the last one). The clasps were then attached transversally to the medal's suspension bar.

1. Ardeal
2. Cerna
3. Jiul - actually Jiu on existing clasps
4. Carpați
5. Oituz
6. București
7. Turtucaia
8. Dobrogea
9. Mărăști
10. Mărășești
11. Târgu-Ocna
12. Dunărea
13. 1918
14. 1919
15. Siberia
16. Italia
17. Tradiție

== Usage and hierarchy ==
The medal was displayed on official occasions and ceremonies on the left breast of the jacket. On other occasions, it was customary to display only the ribbon bar, pinned on the left buttonhole. In the hierarchy of the Romanian military and civil awards and decorations from the mid 1930s, the Commemorative Cross held the very low 32nd place. The customary hierarchy of the military decorations was (not including those from the Independence War):

1. Order of Michael the Brave
2. The Military Virtue
3. The Aeronautical Virtue
4. The Cross of Queen Marie
5. The Sanitary Merit Cross
6. Valour and Faith with swords
7. The Country's Momentum
8. The Commemorative Cross 1916-1918
9. Victory Medal

== See also ==
- Victory Medal (Romania)
