= Shokichi Hata =

Japanese sculptor

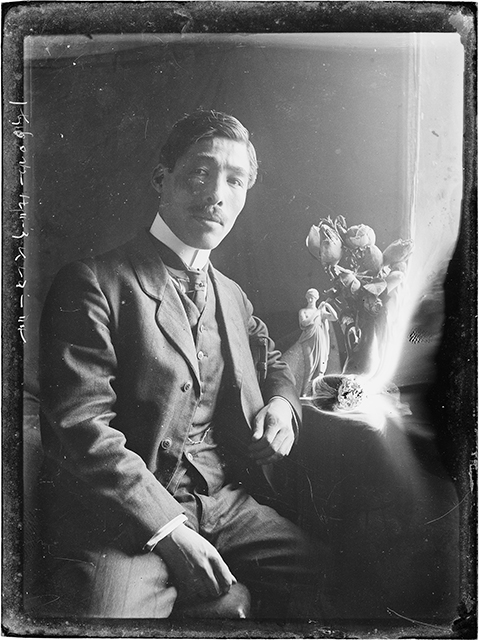
- Hata Shōkichi in Paris, 1910
- Born: 12 February 1882; Takaoka, Japan
- Died: 24 June 1966 (aged 84); Mitaka, Japan
- Occupation: Sculptor

Shokichi Hata (畑 正吉, Hata Shōkichi; 12 February 1882, Takaoka, Toyama – 24 June 1966, Mitaka, Tokyo) was a Japanese sculptor. His work was part of the sculpture event in the art competition at the 1936 Summer Olympics.
