= Arthus-Bertrand =

French silversmith company

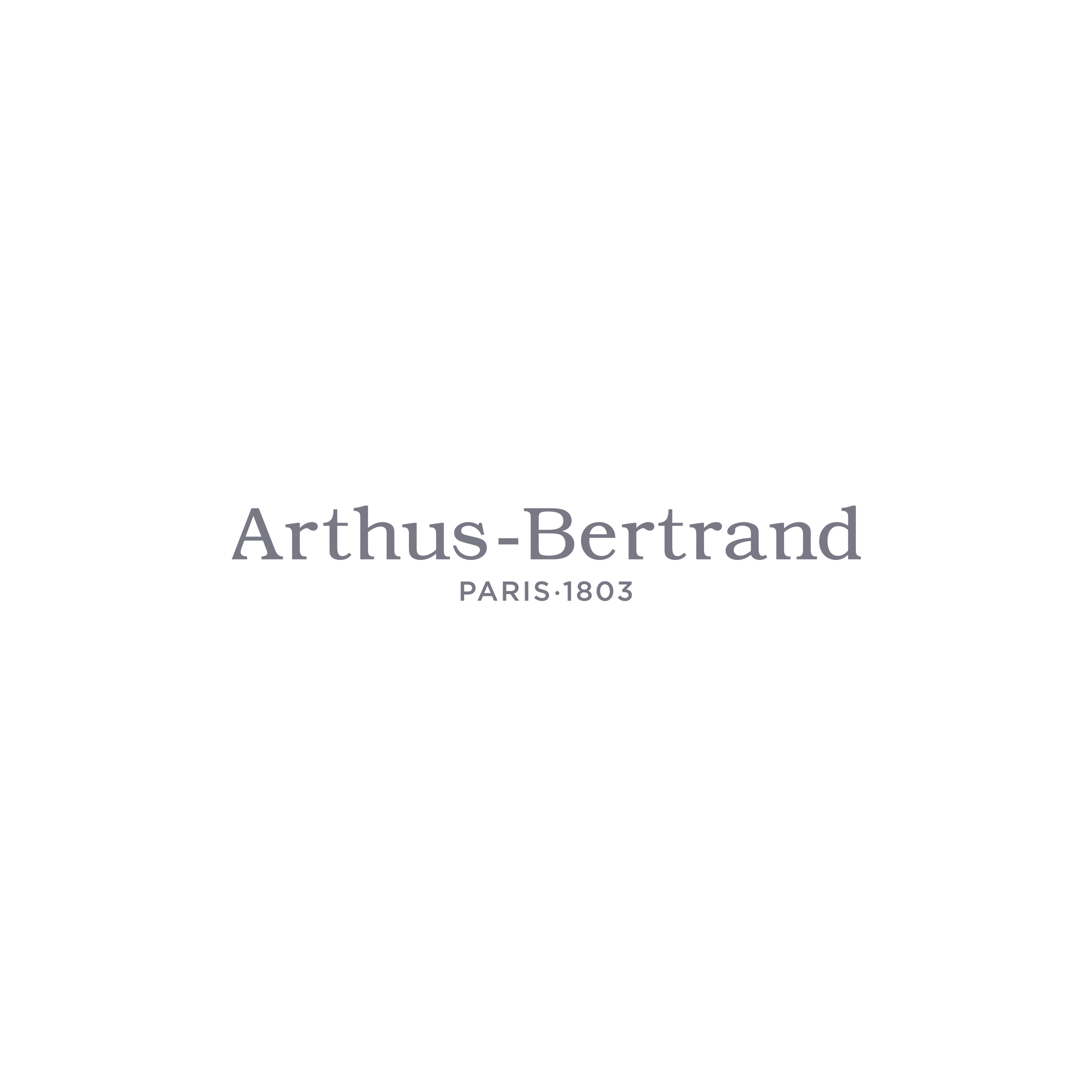

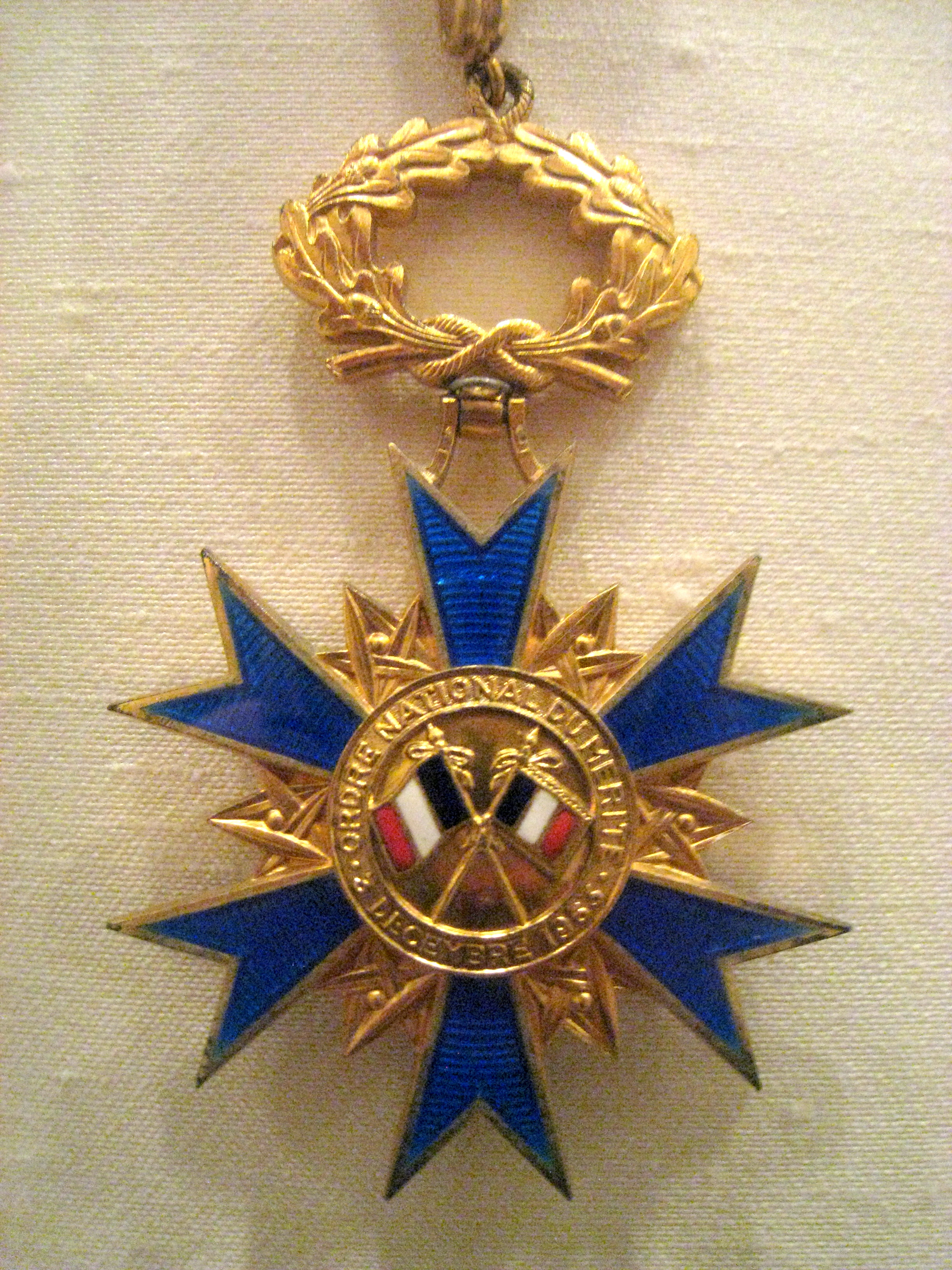
- Company type: SAS
- Industry: Medalist, Goldsmith
- Founded: 1803; 223 years ago
- Founder: Claude Arthus-Bertrand
- Headquarters: Paris, France
- Key people: Michel-Ange Marion
- Products: medals, order's insignias, jewellery, watches
- Website: en.arthusbertrand.com

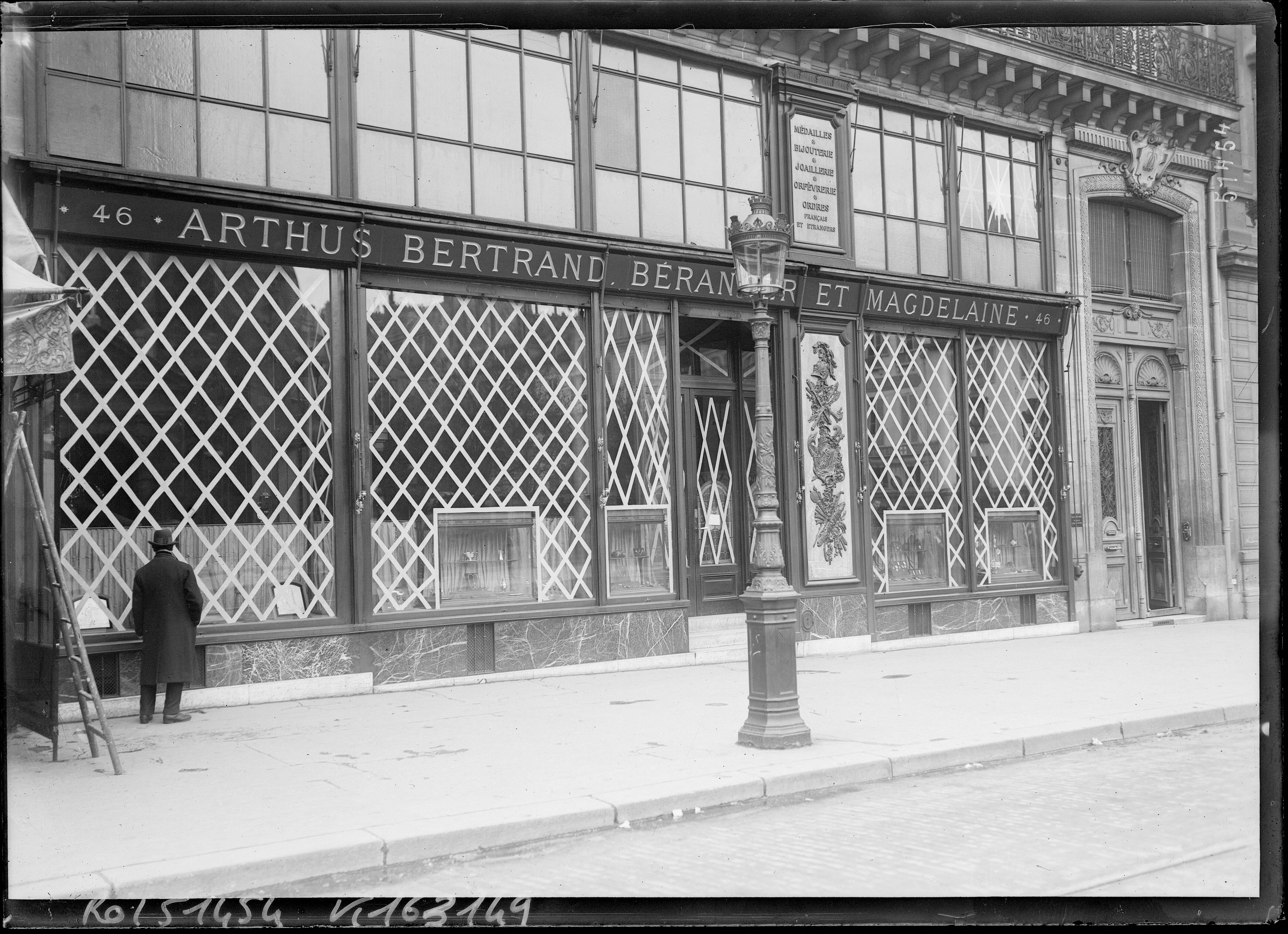

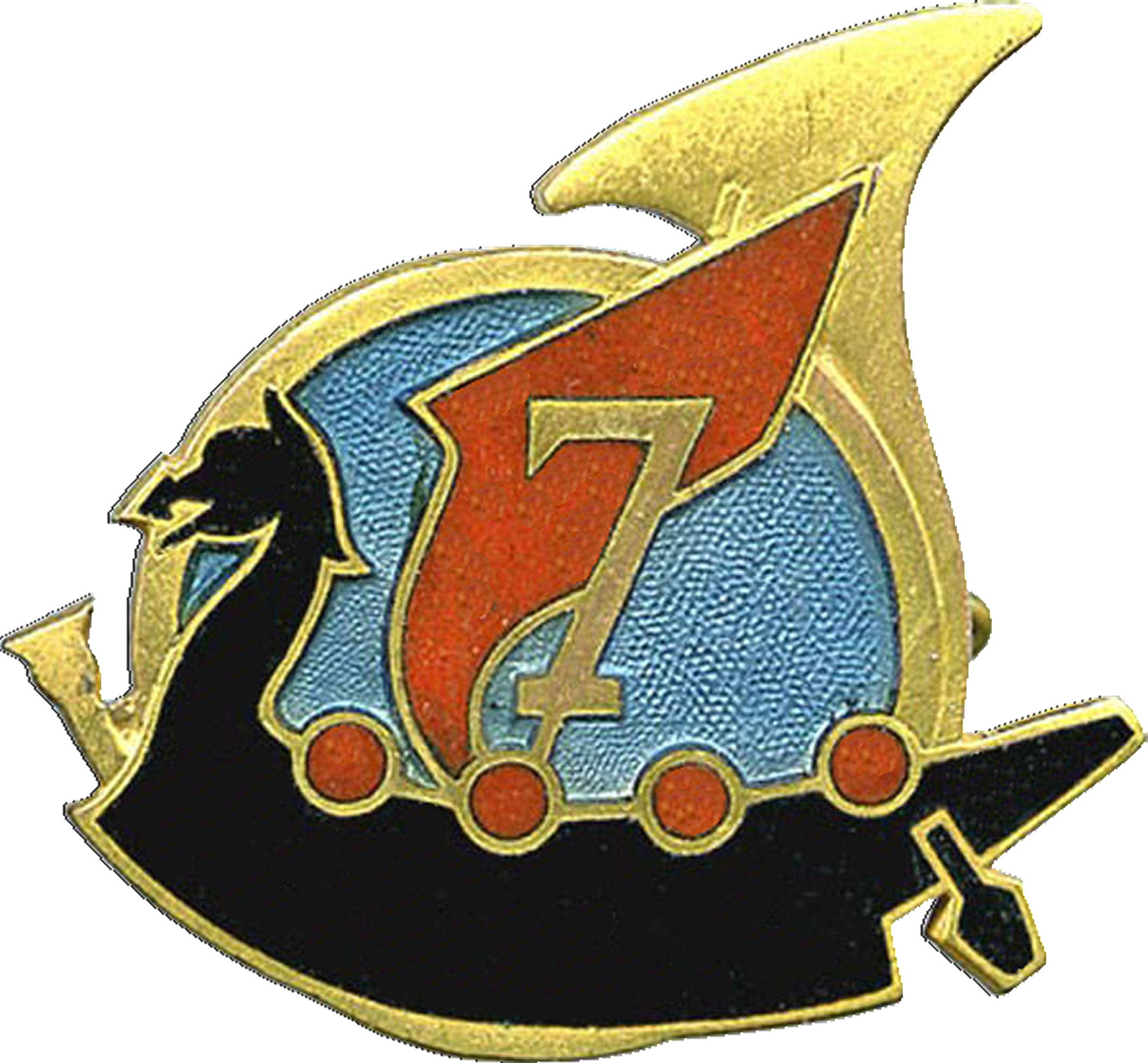

Arthus-Bertrand is a maker of medals and decorations. It was founded in Paris in 1803 by Claude Arthus-Bertrand, an army officer during the French Revolution. Artists who have designed for the firm include Frédéric Auguste Bartholdi (sculptor of the Statue of Liberty) and Fernand Léger. The company employs nearly 300 people.

Arthus-Bertrand has had many distinguished clients to include the French government. It is the official manufacturer of the French Legion of Honour and has made insignia for the Society of the Cincinnati and the Order of Lafayette.
