= Gaetano Orsolini =

Italian sculptor

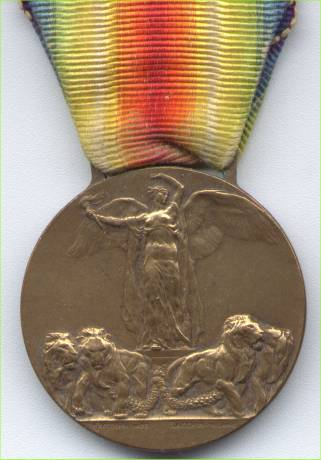
Italian version of the Inter-Allied Victory Medal by Gaetano Orsolini

Gaetano Orsolini (7 March 1884 – July 1954) was an Italian sculptor, medallist and engraver.

Orsolini was born in Montegiorgio. He was most notable for his work on Italian memorials to the First World War and as the designer of Italy's variant of the Allied Victory Medal. He died in Turin.

== Sources ==
- "Gaetano Orsolini". Montegiorgio - Rete Civica. Archived from the original on May 9, 2006.
- "Gaetano Orsolini". Montegiorgio - Rete Civica. Archived from the original on Sep 29, 2007.
