= Otakar Španiel =

Czech sculptor (1881–1955)

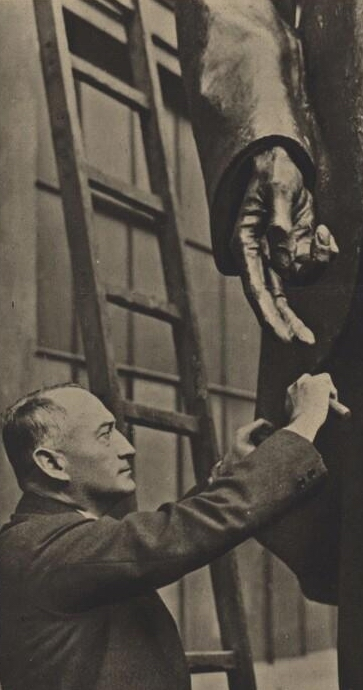
Španiel working on his statue of Jan Masaryk, 1928

Otakar Španiel (13 June 1881 – 15 February 1955) was a Czech sculptor and engraver.

== Life and career ==
Španiel was born on 13 June 1881 in Jaroměř. After primary education, he studied at the Engraving School in Jablonec nad Nisou and graduated from the Viennese Academy of Fine Arts in 1901.

In his following years, he continued his studies at the Academy under the guidance of Josef Václav Myslbek, founder of modern Czech sculpting style. He later went to Paris to complete his fine arts education. His stay in Paris was crucial to him: while he was there he met Antoine Bourdelle, who influenced his distinctive style in his later works. In 1917, he became a professor at the School of Applied Arts in Prague, and from 1919, he was a professor at the Academy of Arts. His work was part of the art competitions at the 1912 Summer Olympics and the 1936 Summer Olympics.

During the Nazi occupation of Czechoslovakia, he was imprisoned in the internment camp in Svatobořice. His brother, General Oldrich Španiel, left Czechoslovakia after the occupation.

Otakar Španiel died on 15 February 1955 in Prague.
