= Paul Du Bois =

Belgian sculptor and medalist

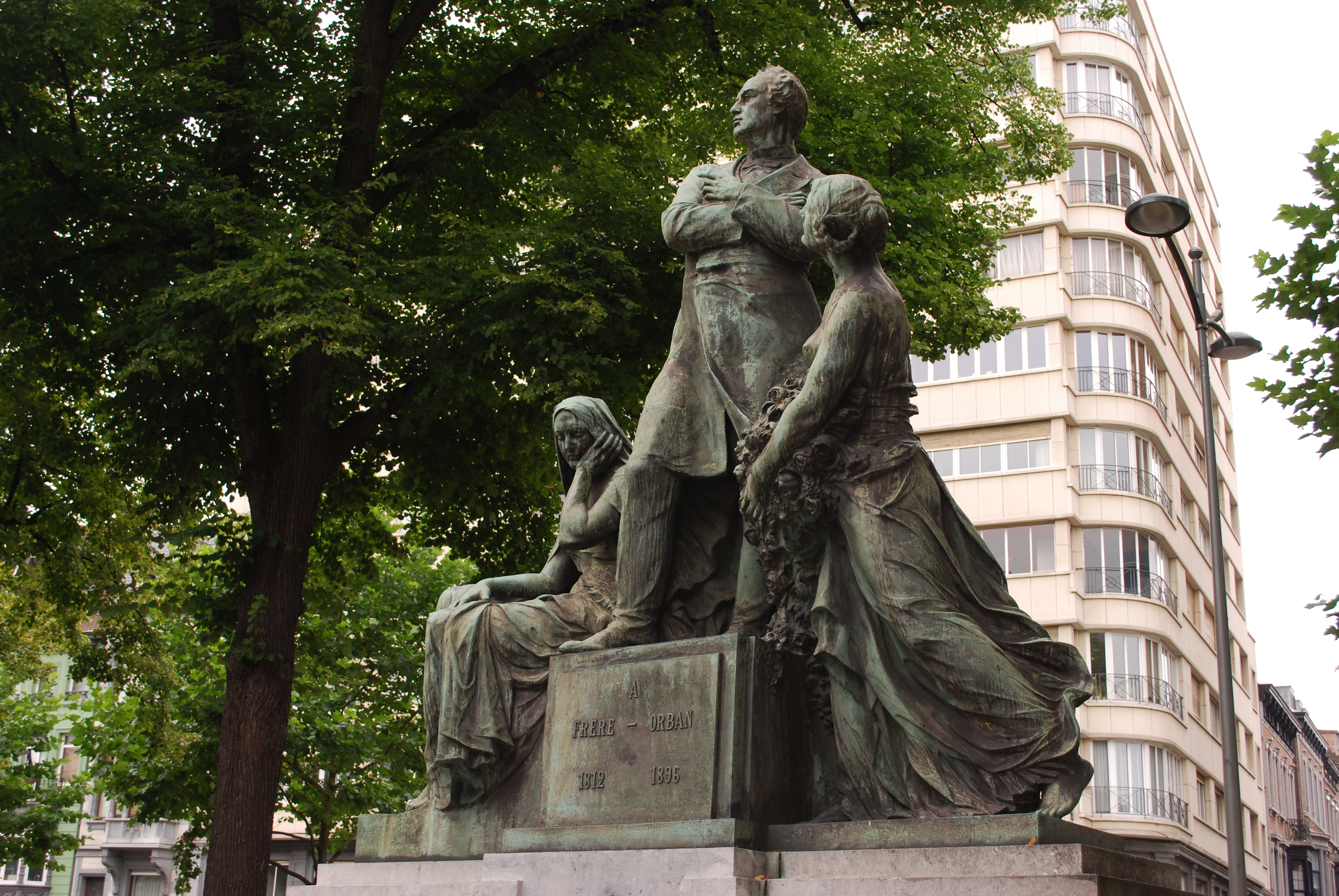
Monument Walthère Frère-Orban, Liège

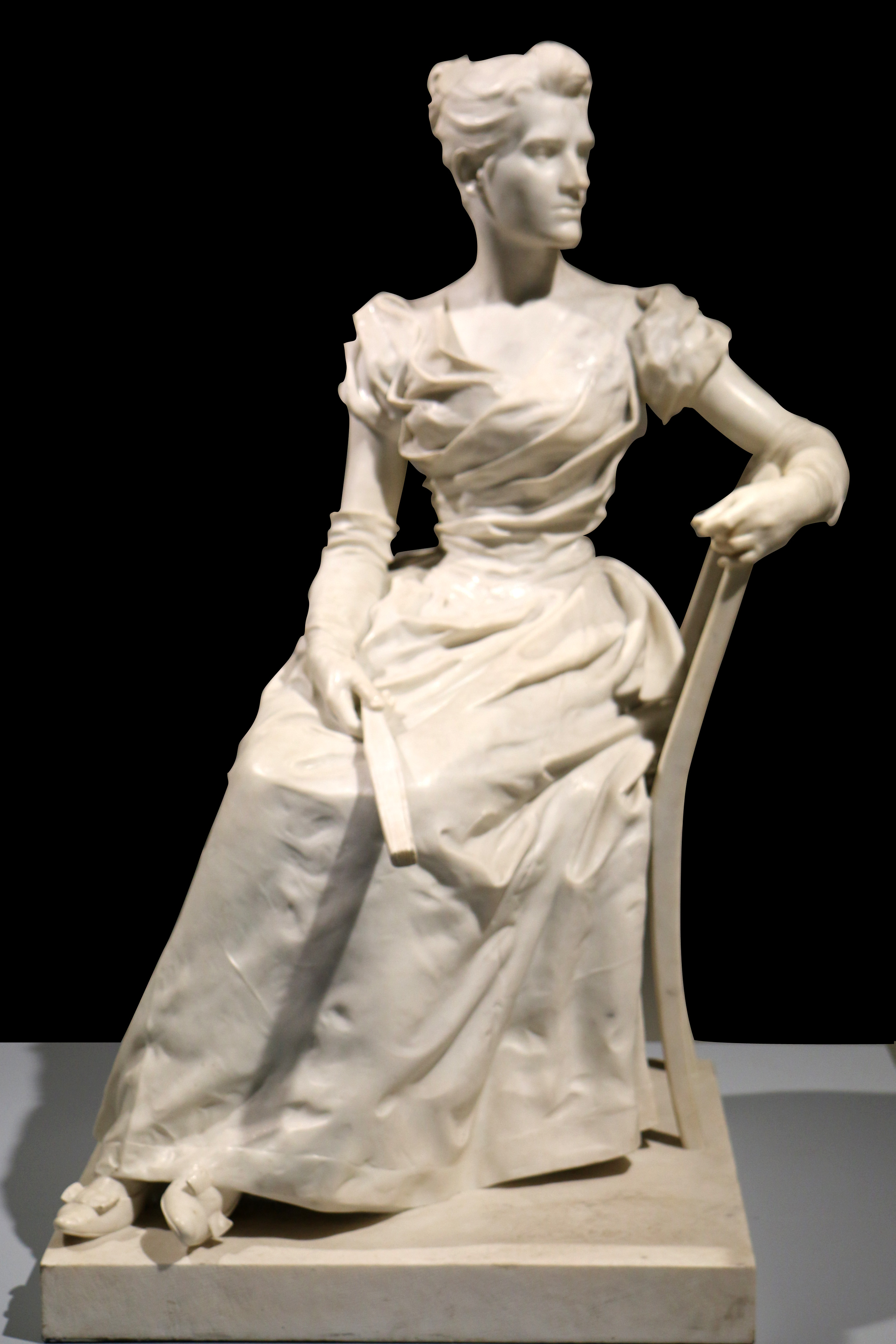
Seated Lady, Royal Museums of Fine Arts of Belgium

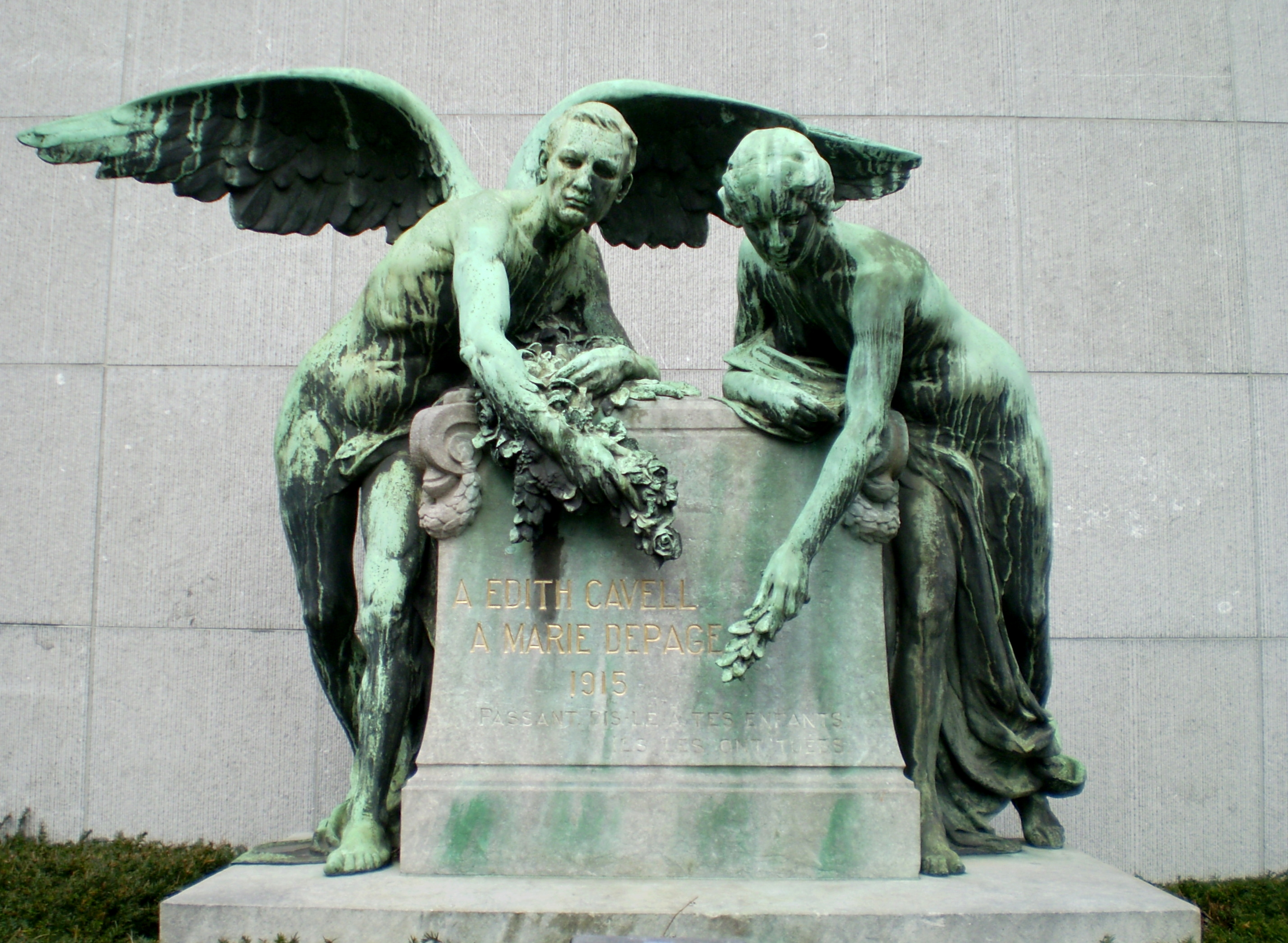
Monument to Edith Cavell and Marie Depage, Brussels

Paul Du Bois (French pronunciation: [pɔl dy bwa]; 1859–1938) was a Belgian sculptor and medalist, born in Aywaille, and died in Uccle, a municipality of Brussels (Belgium).

Du Bois was a student of Eugène Simonis and Charles van der Stappen. He studied from 1877 to 1883 at the Académie Royale des Beaux-Arts in Brussels and earned the distinguished Prix Godecharle in 1884.

Du Bois contributed to the renewal of artistic expression in Belgium at the end of the 20th century, and was one of the founders of the art group Les XX. His own eclectic work consists of small sculptures, medals, jewelry, fine art sculpture, public monuments, and tombs.

Among his most famous monumental works, located in Brussels, are the monument to Frederic de Merode on Martyrs' Square in Brussels, and the tribute to Edith Cavell and fellow nurse Marie Depage (of the RMS Lusitania), the Four Elements group in the Botanical Garden of Brussels, and several sculptures in the municipality of Saint-Gilles. He was also responsible for the design of the Victory Medal of World War I, of which 350,000 copies were issued.

Many other monuments are erected on his hand and places in the cemeteries of Ixelles, from Uccle, Tournai, Mons, Frameries, Huy, and Liège. His works are also exhibited in the museums of different cities.

== Honors and awards ==
- Knight of the Order of Legion of Honour
- Commander of the Order of Leopold (Belgium)
- Commander of the Order of the Crown (Belgium)
