= Victory Medal 1914–1918 =

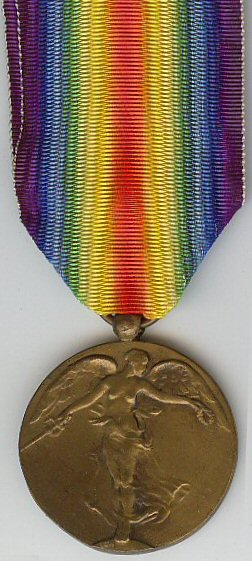
- Inter-Allied Victory Medal 1914–1918 (obverse)
- Type: Commemorative war medal
- Awarded for: Military Service during World War 1
- Presented by: Kingdom of Belgium
- Eligibility: Belgian citizens
- Status: No longer awarded
- Established: 15 July 1919
- Ribbon of the Inter-Allied Victory Medal 1914–1918

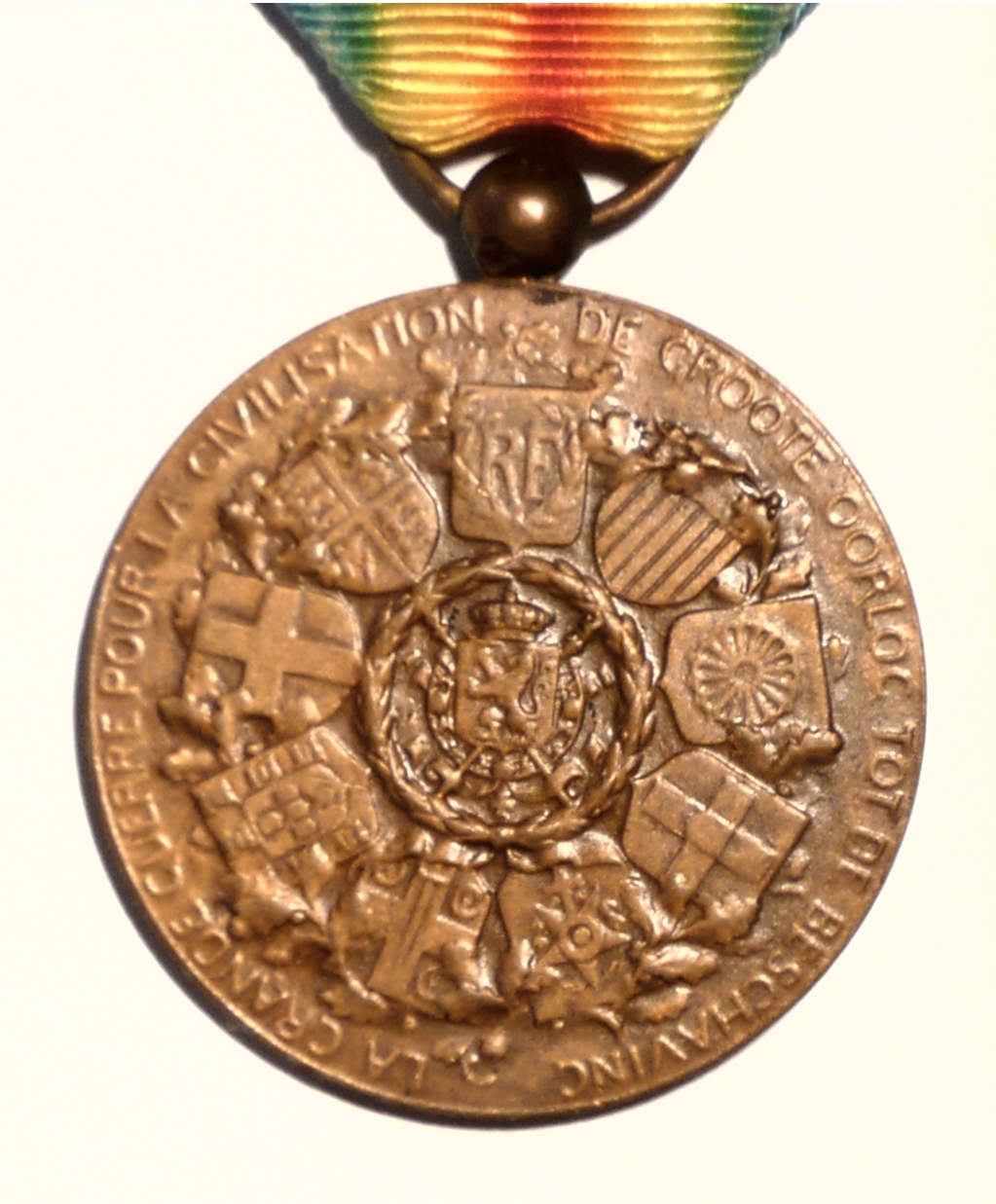
Reverse of the Belgian Inter-Allied Victory Medal

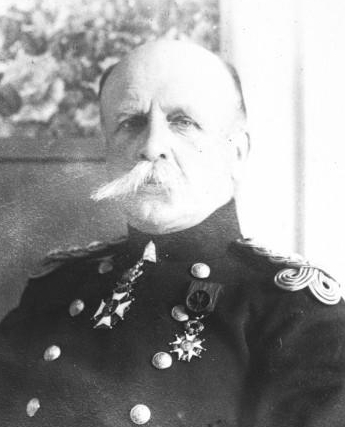
Lieutenant General Baron Léon de Witte de Haelen, a recipient of the Inter-Allied Victory Medal

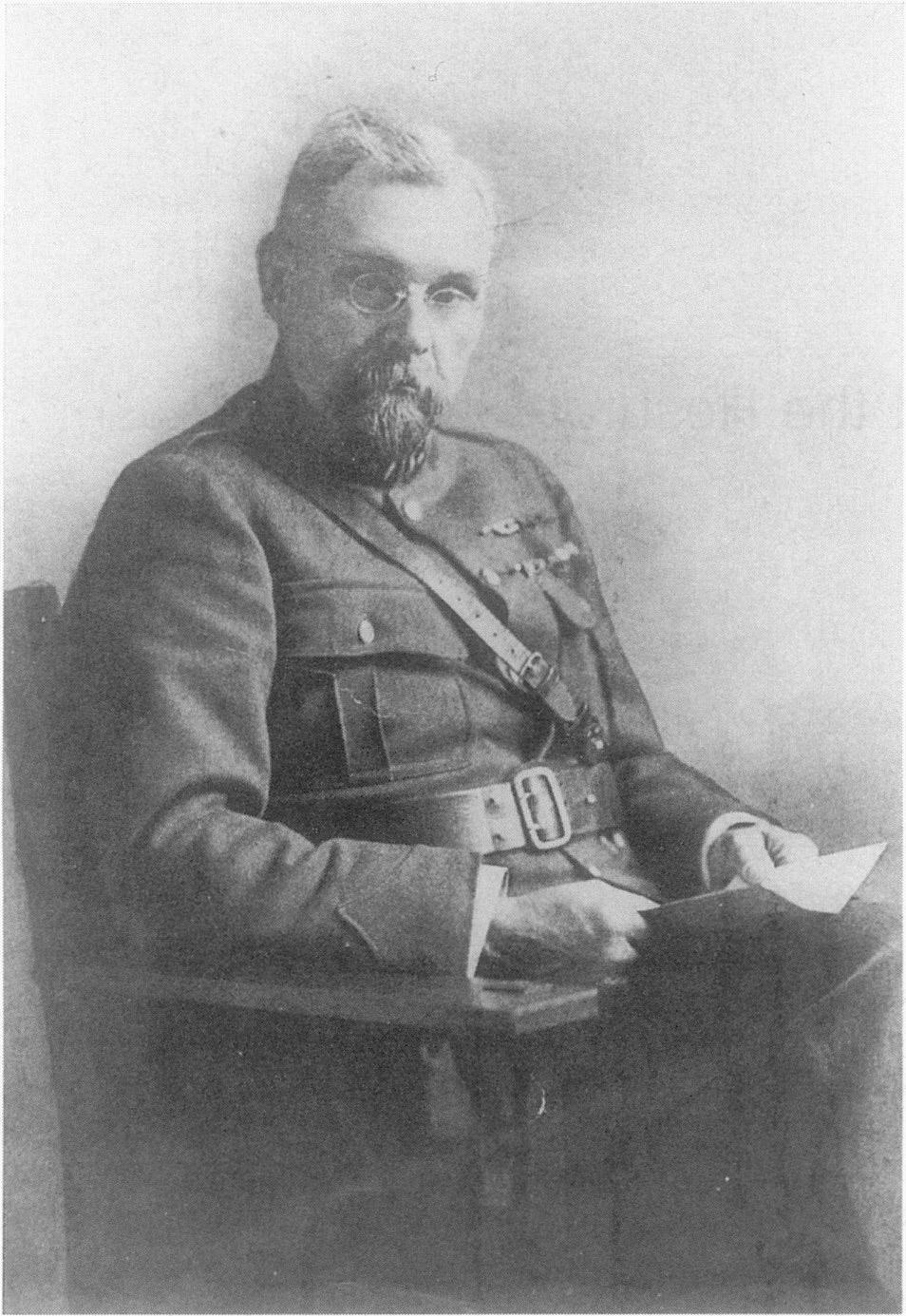
Major General Doctor Antoine Depage, a recipient of the Inter-Allied Victory Medal

The Victory Medal is the Belgian variant of the Inter-Allied Victory Medal 1914–1918 (French: "Médaille de la Victoire 1914–1918, Dutch: "Zegemedaille 1914–1918") was a Belgian commemorative war medal established by royal decree on 15 July 1919 and awarded to all members of the Belgian Armed Forces who served during the First World War. Later royal decrees enlarged the list of potential recipients to include service in African campaigns and under special circumstances, to members of the merchant navy and fishing fleet. In all, 350,000 were awarded.

The Belgian sculptor Paul Du Bois was responsible for the design.

It is worn immediately after the Yser Medal (or Yser Cross) in the Belgian order of precedence.

== Award description ==
The Belgian Inter-Allied Victory Medal 1914–1918 was a 36 mm in diameter circular gilt bronze medal. Its obverse bore a winged victory standing on a globe, her arms and wings spread out, looking down at Earth. The reverse bore, superimposed over a laurel wreath, the coats of arms of the Allies, starting at center top and going clockwise, French Third Republic, United States, Empire of Japan, Kingdom of Greece, Brazil, Serbia, Portugal, Kingdom of Italy, United Kingdom, and at center, the Royal Coat of Arms of Belgium. Along the outer circumference, the relief bilingual inscription in French and Dutch "THE GREAT WAR FOR CIVILISATION" (French: LA GRANDE GUERRE POUR LA CIVILISATION", Dutch: "DE GROOTE OORLOG TOT DE BESCHAVING").

The medal was suspended by a ring through a suspension loop from a 38 mm wide silk moiré rainbow coloured ribbon common to the Inter-Allied Victory Medals 1914–1918 of all the First World War Allies.

== Notable recipients (partial list) ==
The individuals listed below were awarded the Belgian Inter-Allied Victory Medal:

- Lieutenant General Alphonse Ferdinand Tromme
- Cavalry Lieutenant General Marcel Jooris
- Major General Maurice Jacmart
- Lieutenant General Jean-Baptiste Piron
- Lieutenant General Jules Joseph Pire
- Cavalry Lieutenant General Sir Maximilien de Neve de Roden
- Cavalry Lieutenant General Baron Victor Van Strijdonck de Burkel
- Lieutenant General Georges Deffontaine
- Lieutenant General Alphonse Verstraete
- Lieutenant General Baron Raoul de Hennin de Boussu-Walcourt
- Lieutenant General Joseph Leroy
- Cavalry Lieutenant General Jules De Boeck
- Lieutenant General Fernand Vanderhaeghen
- Lieutenant General Robert Oor
- Lieutenant General Libert Elie Thomas
- Lieutenant General Léon Bievez
- Cavalry Major General Baron Beaudoin de Maere d’Aertrycke
- Major General Lucien Van Hoof
- Major General Jean Buysse
- Major General Paul Jacques
- Commodore Georges Timmermans
- Aviator Major General Norbert Leboutte
- Police Lieutenant General Louis Joseph Leroy
- Police Lieutenant General Oscar-Eugène Dethise
- Chaplain General Louis Kerremans
- Lieutenant General Harry Jungbluth
- Cavalry Lieutenant General Baron Albert du Roy de Blicquy
- Lieutenant General Sir Antonin de Selliers de Moranville
- Lieutenant General Baron Louis de Ryckel
- Lieutenant General Baron Émile Dossin de Saint-Georges
- Lieutenant General Baron Honoré Drubbel
- Lieutenant General Count Gérard-Mathieu Leman
- Lieutenant General Victor Bertrand
- Lieutenant General Baron Jules Jacques de Dixmude
- Lieutenant General Georges Guiette
- Lieutenant General Albert Lantonnois van Rode
- Lieutenant General Baron Armand de Ceuninck
- Lieutenant General Aloïs Biebuyck
- Cavalry Lieutenant General Baron Léon de Witte de Haelen
- Cavalry Lieutenant General Vicount Victor Buffin de Chosal
- Cavalry Lieutenant General Jules De Blauwe
- Major General Doctor Antoine Depage
- Major General Baron Edouard Empain

Plk. gst. Jaroslav Hajicek (Czechoslovakia)

== See also ==
- Orders, decorations, and medals of Belgium

== Other sources ==
- Quinot H., 1950, Recueil illustré des décorations belges et congolaises, 4e Edition. (Hasselt)
- Cornet R., 1982, Recueil des dispositions légales et réglementaires régissant les ordres nationaux belges. 2e Ed. N.pl., (Brussels)
- Borné A.C., 1985, Distinctions honorifiques de la Belgique, 1830-1985 (Brussels)
