= Victory Medal (Japan) =

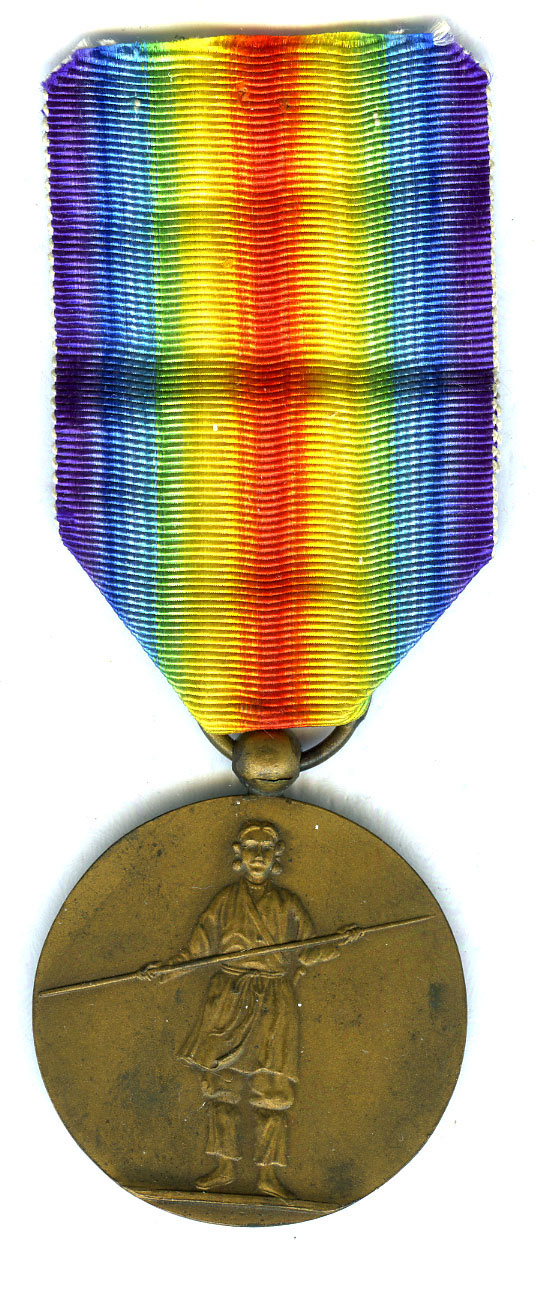
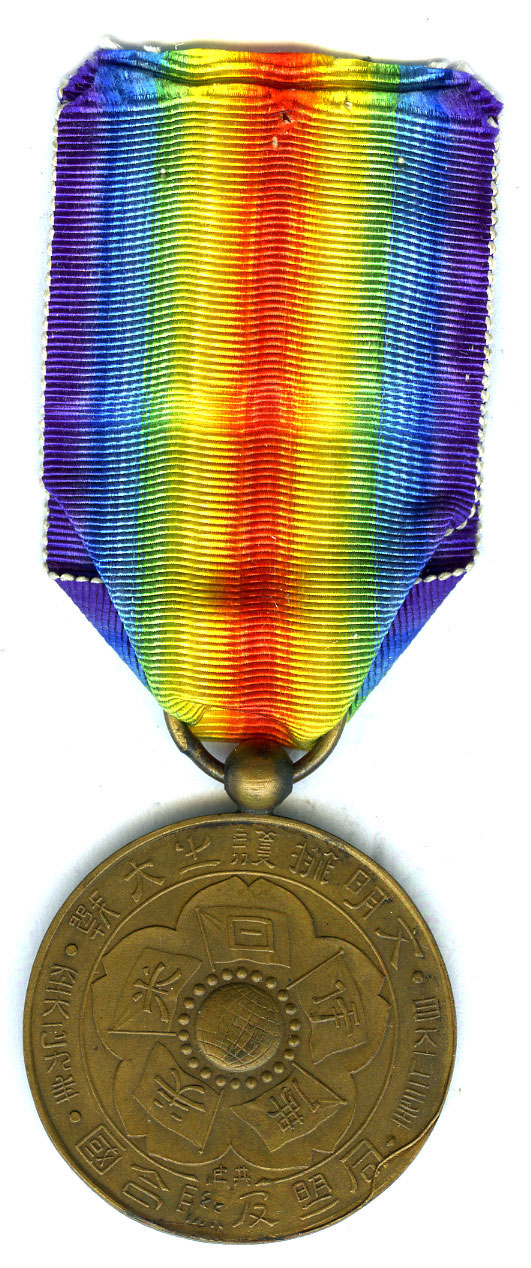
- Japanese Victory Medal (obverse and reverse)
- Type: Commemorative war medal
- Awarded for: Military Service during World War I
- Presented by: Japan
- Eligibility: Japanese citizens
- Status: No longer awarded
- Established: 17 September 1920
- Ribbon of the Inter-Allied Victory Medal 1914–1918

The Victory Medal (Japanese: 戦捷記章) was a commemorative military medal of Japan awarded to mark service during the First World War. Established by Imperial Edict #406 on 17 September 1920, it was one of the series of Victory Medals created and awarded by the victorious allies after the First World War. Fifteen nations in all issued a version of the medal. All shared the rainbow suspension and service ribbon, but the medals' designs varied by country. Japan's design was different from all other versions as it did not depict the goddess Victory. This figure from Roman mythology would have no connection to Japanese culture, so a depiction of Takemikazuchi, the war god in Japanese mythology occupies the obverse of the medal. Similarly, the Siamese (Thai) Victory Medal depicts Narayana (Vishnu), the Hindu god of preservation and protector of the universe.

== See also ==
- Japanese intervention in Siberia
