= Allied Victory Medal (Italy) =

Allied Victory Medal Medaglia interalleata della vittoria
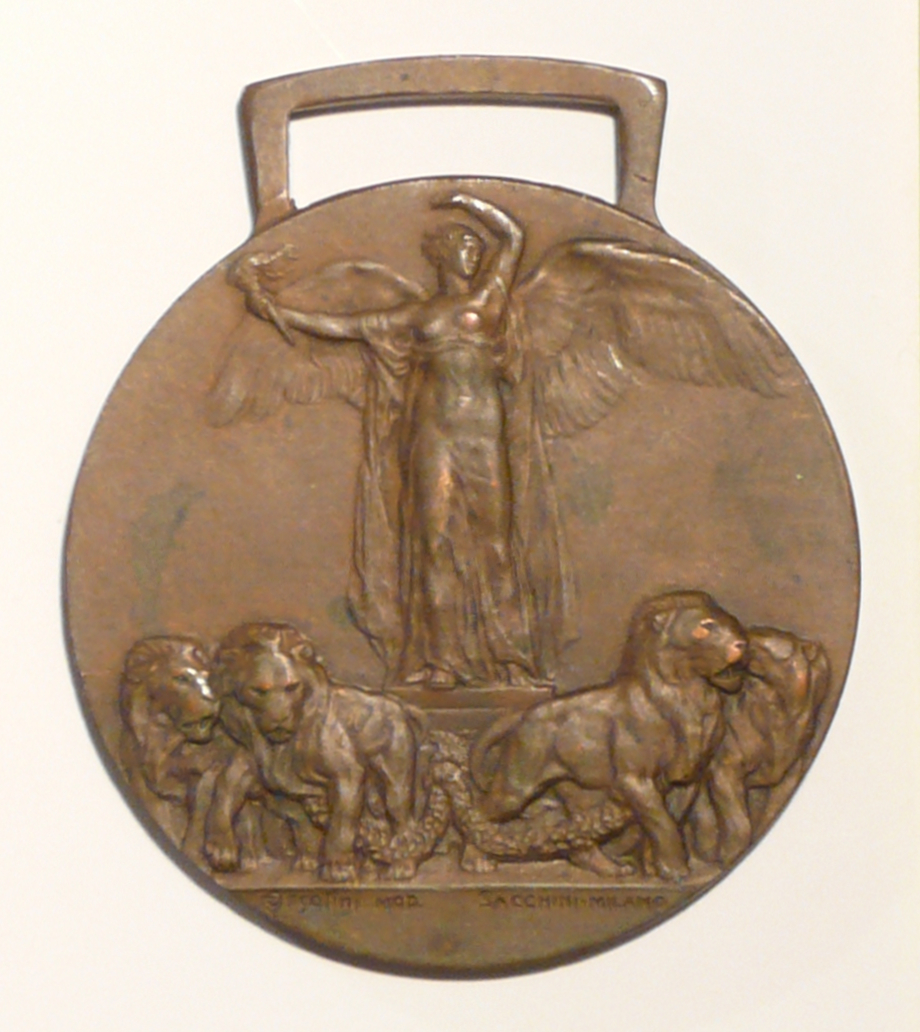
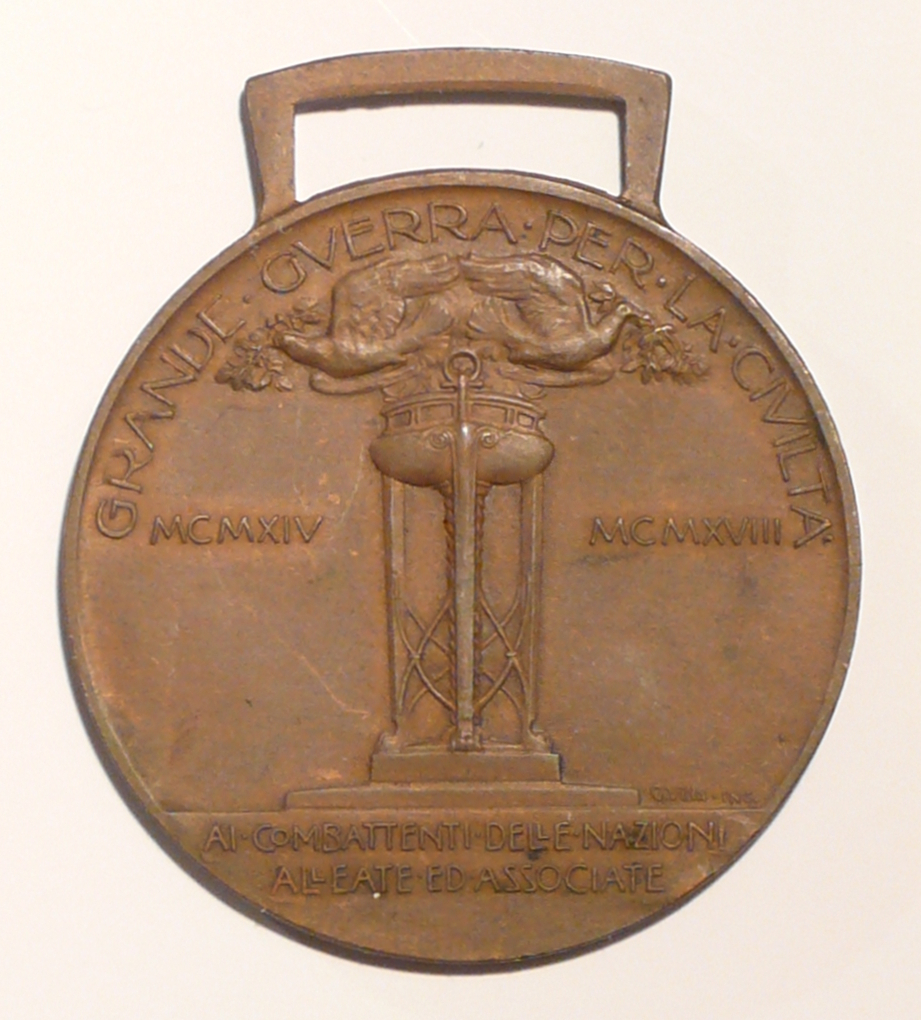
- Obverse and reverse of the medal
- Type: Campaign medal
- Awarded for: Service in World War I
- Presented by: Kingdom of Italy
- Eligibility: Italian officers and soldiers
- Campaign: World War I
- Status: No longer awarded
- Established: 16 December 1920

Highlights
- Total: Approximately 2,000,000
- Ribbon bar of the medal

The Allied Victory Medal (Italian: Medaglia interalleata della vittoria or Medaglia della vittoria commemorativa della grande guerra per la civiltà) was the Italian variant of the Victory Medal of other nations. It was established by royal decree number 1918 on 16 December 1920, which granted it to all who had been awarded the "fatiche di guerra" distinction by royal decree number 641 of 21 May 1916, or who had served for four months in an area under the jurisdiction of the armed forces and who had been mobilised and directly worked with the operational army.

A public competition to design it was won by Gaetano Orsolini, with his design of 'Victory on a triumphal chariot, with the torch of liberty, drawn by four yoked lions'.

== Bibliography ==
- Alexander J. Laslo, The Interallied Victory Medals of World War I, 2nd revised edition, Albuquerque, Dorado Publishing, 1992. ISBN 0-9617320-1-6
