= Commemorative Medal of the 1914–1918 War =

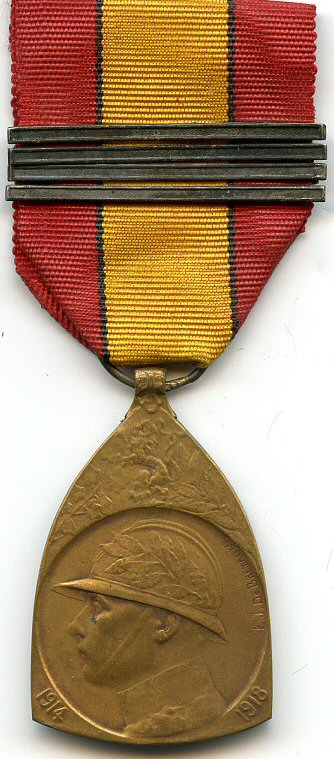
- 1914–1918 Commemorative War Medal, bearing four silver bars representing time served on the Front.
- Type: War medal
- Awarded for: Military Service during World War 1
- Presented by: Kingdom of Belgium
- Eligibility: Belgian citizens
- Status: No longer awarded
- Established: 21 July 1919
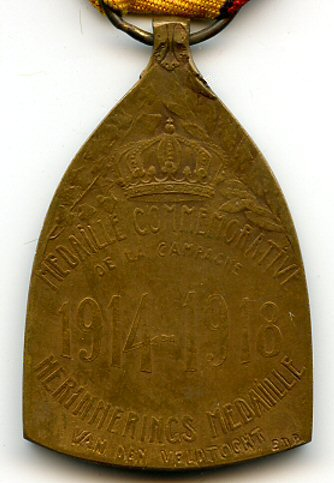
- Reverse of the medal Ribbon bar

The Commemorative Medal of the 1914–1918 War (French: Médaille Commémorative de la Guerre 1914–1918, Dutch: Oorlogsherinneringsmedaille 1914–1918) was a Belgian commemorative war medal established by royal decree on 21 July 1919 and awarded to all members of the Belgian Armed Forces who served during the First World War that were eligible for the inter-allied victory medal.

== Medal description ==
The Belgian 1914–1918 Commemorative War Medal was struck from bronze, it was 47 mm high by 31 mm wide, triangular shaped and with rounded sides. On its obverse, the relief left profile of a helmeted soldier within a 29 mm in diameter circular recess, the helmet adorned with laurels. Between the circular recess and the bottom left corner of the medal, the relief date "1914", in the lower right corner, the relief date "1918". In the upper point of the triangle, above the circular recess, the relief images of a lion rampant with an oak branch to its left and a laurel branch to its right. On the reverse, near the top, the relief image of a crown surrounded by the same branches as the lion on the obverse, below the crown, the relief semi circular inscription in French on two rows over the large relief dates "1914 – 1918", "MEDAILLE COMMEMORATIVE / DE LA CAMPAGNE", the inscription repeated in Dutch below the dates "HERDENKINGSMEDAILLE / VAN DEN VELDTOCHT" (COMMEMORATIVE MEDAL OF THE 1914 – 1918 CAMPAIGN).

== Ribbon and devices ==
The medal was suspended by a ring through the suspension loop to a 39 mm wide red silk moiré ribbon with an 11 mm wide central yellow stripe bordered by 1 mm wide black stripes.

Multiple devices were allowed for wear on the ribbon:

- A crown for volunteers, also eligible for a separate medal;
- Silver bars, the 1st bar denoting a year at the front, consecutive individual silver bars denoting additional periods of six months at the front;
- Gold bar, worn in lieu of five silver bars;
- A red enamelled cross for each wound received in combat;
- Naval anchor, for sailors also awarded the "Maritime Decoration";
- "1916-R-1917" or "1916-R-1918" clasps to members of the Expeditionary Corps to Russia.

== Notable recipients (partial list) ==
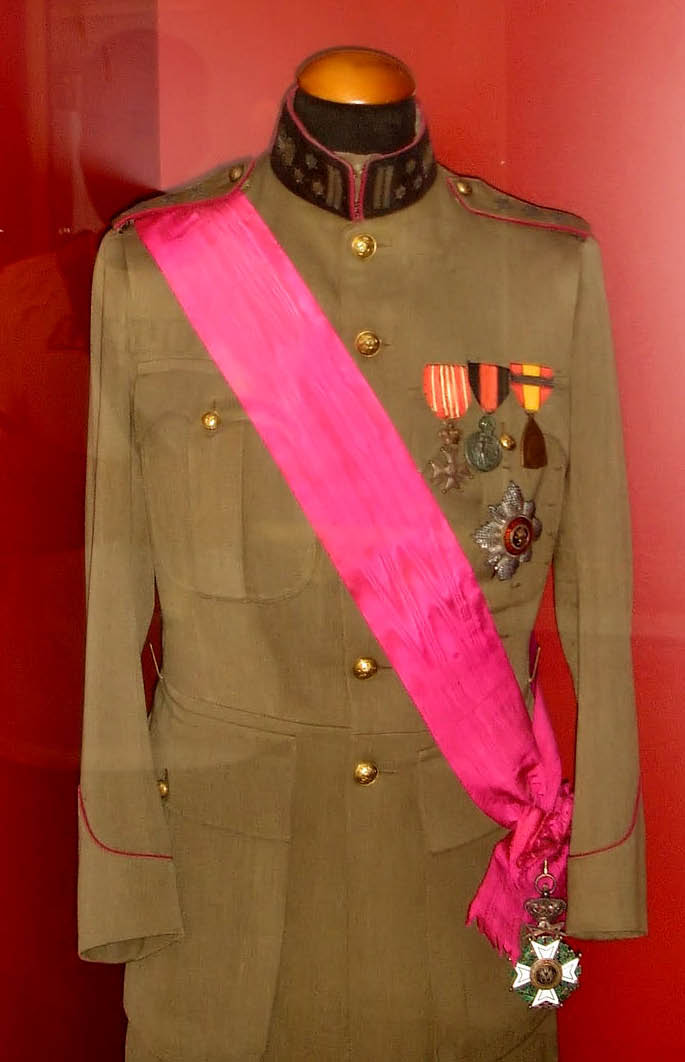
Uniform of King Albert with the Medal.

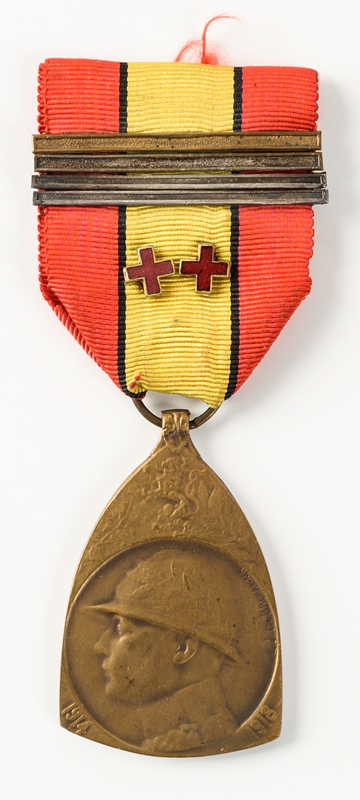
Example of the medal, with one gold bar, three silver bars, and two red crosses

The individuals listed below were awarded the 1914–1918 Commemorative War Medal:

- HM King Albert
- Lieutenant General Alphonse Ferdinand Tromme
- Cavalry Lieutenant General Marcel Jooris
- Major General Maurice Jacmart
- Lieutenant General Jean-Baptiste Piron
- Lieutenant General Jules Joseph Pire
- Cavalry Lieutenant General Sir Maximilien de Neve de Roden
- Cavalry Lieutenant General Baron Victor Van Strijdonck de Burkel
- Lieutenant General Georges Deffontaine
- Lieutenant General Alphonse Verstraete
- Lieutenant General Baron Raoul de Hennin de Boussu-Walcourt
- Lieutenant General Joseph Leroy
- Cavalry Lieutenant General Jules De Boeck
- Lieutenant General Fernand Vanderhaeghen
- Lieutenant General Robert Oor
- Lieutenant General Libert Elie Thomas
- Lieutenant General Léon Bievez
- Cavalry Major General Baron Beaudoin de Maere d'Aertrycke
- Major General Lucien Van Hoof
- Major General Jean Buysse
- Major General Paul Jacques
- Commodore Georges Timmermans
- Aviator Major General Norbert Leboutte
- Police Lieutenant General Louis Joseph Leroy
- Police Lieutenant General Oscar-Eugène Dethise
- Chaplain General Louis Kerremans
- Lieutenant General Harry Jungbluth
- Cavalry Lieutenant General Baron Albert du Roy de Blicquy
- Lieutenant General Sir Antonin de Selliers de Moranville
- Lieutenant General Baron Louis de Ryckel
- Lieutenant General Baron Émile Dossin de Saint-Georges
- Lieutenant General Baron Honoré Drubbel
- Lieutenant General Count Gérard-Mathieu Leman
- Lieutenant General Victor Bertrand
- Lieutenant General Baron Jules Jacques de Dixmude
- Lieutenant General Georges Guiette
- Lieutenant General Albert Lantonnois van Rode
- Lieutenant General Baron Armand de Ceuninck
- Lieutenant General Aloïs Biebuyck
- Cavalry Lieutenant General Baron Léon de Witte de Haelen
- Cavalry Lieutenant General Vicount Victor Buffin de Chosal
- Cavalry Lieutenant General Jules De Blauwe
- Major General Doctor Antoine Depage
- Major General Baron Edouard Empain

== See also ==
- Orders, decorations, and medals of Belgium

== Other sources ==
- Quinot H., 1950, Recueil illustré des décorations belges et congolaises, 4e Edition. (Hasselt)
- Cornet R., 1982, Recueil des dispositions légales et réglementaires régissant les ordres nationaux belges. 2e Ed. N.pl., (Brussels)
- Borné A.C., 1985, Distinctions honorifiques de la Belgique, 1830–1985 (Brussels)
