= Fifth Battle of Ypres =

1918 battle on the Western Front of World War I

- Part of the Western Front of the First World War
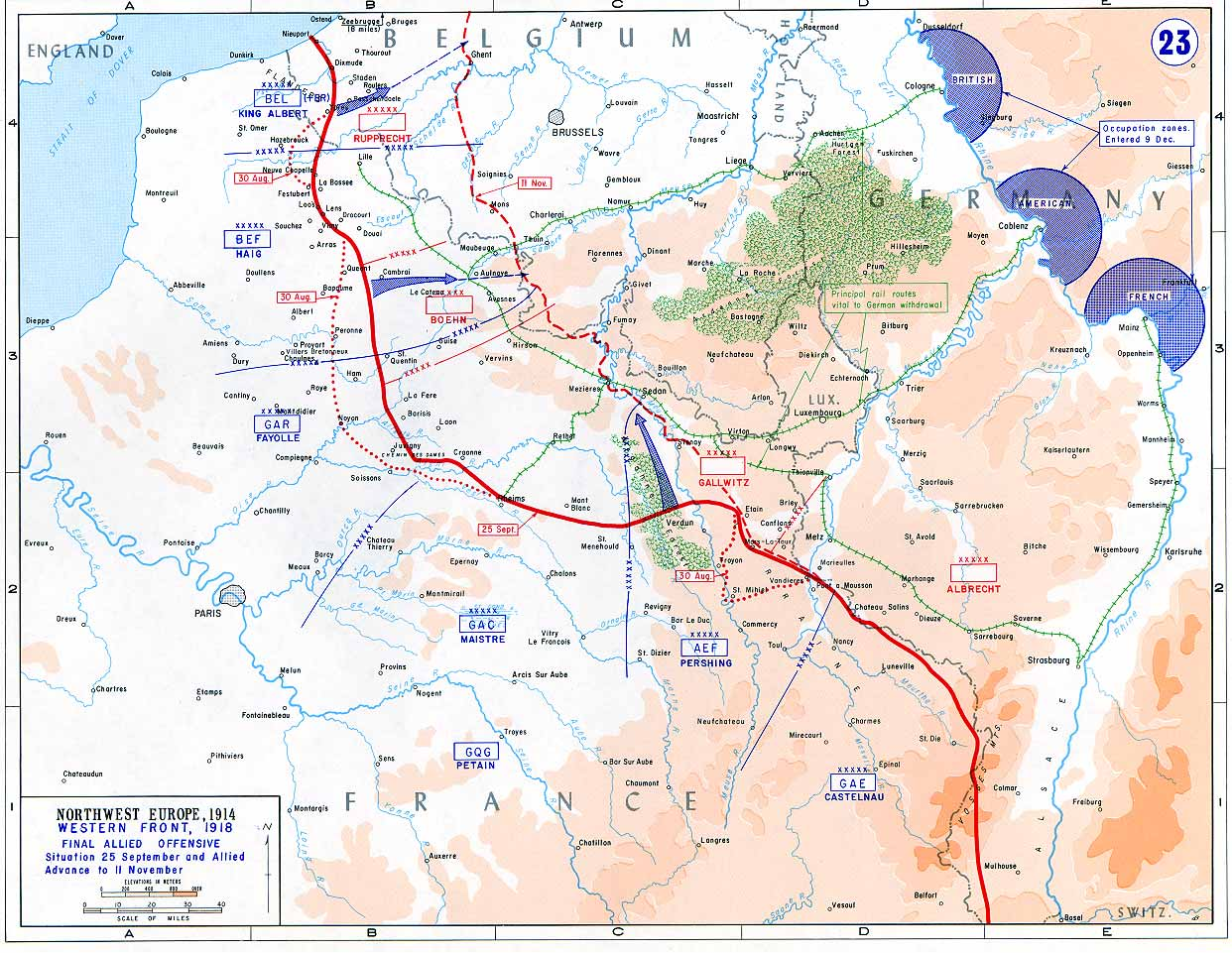
- Map of the final Allied offensives on the Western Front, 1918
Date	28 September – 2 October 1918
Location	From Ypres to Ghent, Belgium 50°54′1″N 3°1′16″E
Result	Allied victory

Belligerents
Belgium; United Kingdom; France; Newfoundland	German Empire: Bavaria; Prussia

Commanders and leaders
(Belgium) King Albert I; (French Third Republic) Jean Degoutte; (Belgium) Cyriaque Gillain; (United Kingdom of Great Britain and Ireland) Herbert Plumer; (French Third Republic) Antoine Baucheron de Boissoudy	(German Empire) Erich Ludendorff; (German Empire) Crown Prince Rupprecht; (German Empire) Friedrich Sixt von Armin

Strength
28 divisions	16 divisions

Casualties and losses
British: 4,685; Belgian: 4,500; Newfoundland: 15	10,000 POW; 300 guns; 600 machine guns

The Fifth Battle of Ypres, also called the Advance in Flanders and the Battle of the Peaks of Flanders (French: Bataille des Crêtes de Flandres) is an informal name of First World War battles in northern France and southern Belgium (Flanders) from late September to October 1918.

== Background ==
After the German spring offensive of 1918 failed to achieve a decisive victory, German morale waned and the increasing numbers of American soldiers arriving on the Western Front gave the Allies a growing numerical advantage over the western armies of the German Empire. To take advantage of this, Marshal of France Ferdinand Foch developed a strategy which became known as the Grand Offensive, in which attacks were made on the German lines over as wide a front as possible. Belgian, British and French forces around the Ypres Salient were to form the northern pincer of an offensive towards the Belgian city of Liège. The British Second Army had followed up some minor withdrawals and had fought the action at Outtersteene Ridge on 18 August, after which there was a lull. Allied troops in the area were well rested by late September.

== Battle ==
The Groupe d'Armées des Flandres (GAF, Flanders Army Group, King of the Belgians) attacked at 5:30 a.m. on 28 September, after a three hour artillery preparation. The GAF attacked with 12 Belgian divisions, 10 British divisions of the Second Army and 6 French divisions of the Sixth Army. The British attacked on a 4.5 mi (7.2 km) front up to the Ypres–Zonnebeke road, from where the Belgian army attacked on a line north to Dixmude. The Allied attacks quickly penetrated the German defences and advanced up to 6 mi (9.7 km). Much of the ground west of Passchendaele, abandoned during the withdrawal of early 1918, was recaptured. Rain began to fall but by the evening the British had taken Kortewilde, Zandvoorde, Kruiseecke and Becelaere; Belgian troops had captured Zonnebeke, Poelcappelle, Schaap Baillie and Houthulst Forest. On the southern flank, minor operations by three British divisions advanced to St. Yves, Messines and the ridge from Wytschaete to Hollebeke. The German front line ran from Diksmuide to Houthult, Becelare, Zandvoorde and Hollebeke.

Messines, Terhand and Dadizeele fell on 29 September and by the next day, despite the captured ground becoming another slough of mud, all of the high ground around Ypres was occupied by the Allies. By 1 October, the left bank of the leie (Lys) had been captured up to Comines and the Belgians were east of a line from Moorslede to Staden and Diksmuide. The advance continued until 2 October when German reinforcements arrived and the offensive outran its supplies. Due to the state of the ground, 15,000 rations were delivered by parachute from 80 Belgian and British aircraft.

== Aftermath ==
=== Casualties ===
The British suffered 4,695 casualties, the Belgians "nett" casualties from among 2,000 killed and 10,000 men ill or wounded. The Allies advanced up to 18 mi (29 km), with an average advance of 6 mi (9.7 km) and captured c. 10,000 prisoners, 300 guns and 600 machine-guns.

=== Subsequent operations ===
The offensive was continued with the Battle of Courtrai (14–19 October).

== Order of battle ==
=== Groupe d'Armées des Flandres ===
The Allied units of Army Group Flanders (King Albert I of Belgium), had the French General Jean Degoutte as Chief of Staff.

- British Second Army (General Herbert Plumer)
  - XV Corps (Lieutenant General Beauvoir De Lisle)
    - 31st Division
  - X Corps (Lieutenant General Reginald Stephens)
    - 30th Division
    - 34th Division
  - XIX Corps (Lieutenant General Herbert Watts)
    - 14th (Light) Division
    - 35th Division
    - 41st Division - in reserve
  - II Corps (Lieutenant General Claud Jacob)
    - 9th (Scottish) Division
    - 29th Division
    - 36th (Ulster) Division - in reserve
- Belgian Army (King Albert)
  - South Group (Lieutenant General Aloïs Biebuyck)
    - 11th Division
    - 8th Division
    - 12th Division
    - 6th Division
  - Centre Group (Lieutenant General Jules Jacques de Dixmude)
    - 9th Division
    - 3rd Division
    - French 128th Division - in the rear
  - North Group (Lieutenant General Louis Bernheim)
    - 7th Division
    - 1st Division
    - 10th Division
  - The remaining Belgian infantry divisions protected the inundated Yser Front from Clercken to the sea
    - 4th Division
    - 2nd Division
    - 5th Division
  - Belgian Cavalry Division
- French Sixth Army (Antoine Baucheron de Boissoudy) - as reserves
  - VII Army Corps (Gen André Joseph Emmanuel Massenet) - under Belgian Command
    - 41st Division
    - 164th Division
    - 128th Division - attached to the Belgian Army
  - XXXIV Army Corps (Gen Alphonse Nudant) - still under the control of Foch
    - 5th Division
    - 70th Division
    - 77th Division
  - II Cavalry Corps (Gen Félix Adolphe Robillot) - bivouacked in the area of Proven-Houtkerque-Herzeele
    - 2nd Cavalry Division
    - 4th Cavalry Division
    - 6th Cavalry Division

=== German 4th Army ===
Army Group Rupprecht of Bavaria (Crown Prince Rupprecht of Bavaria), commanding the northern German army group, held Flanders with the 4th Army, which had less than five divisions in the area.

- 4th Army (General der Infanterie Friedrich Sixt von Armin)
  - Naval Corps (Admiral Ludwig von Schröder)
  - Guard Corps (Generalleutnant Alfred von Böckmann)
  - X Reserve Corps (Generalleutnant Arthur von Gabain)

== See also ==
- First Battle of Ypres, 1914
- Second Battle of Ypres, 1915
- Battle of Passchendaele, also known as the Third Battle of Ypres, 1917
- Battle of the Lys, also known as the Fourth Battle of Ypres, 1918
