= Yser Medal =

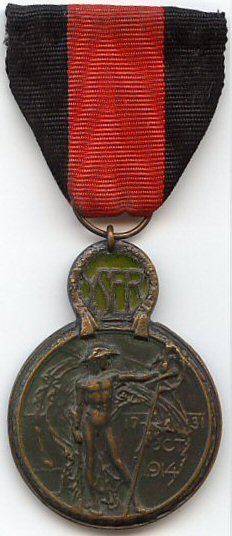
- Yser Medal (obverse)
- Type: Campaign medal
- Awarded for: Distinguished combat service along the Yser in 1914
- Presented by: Kingdom of Belgium
- Eligibility: Members of the Belgian Armed Forces
- Status: No longer awarded
- Established: 18 October 1918
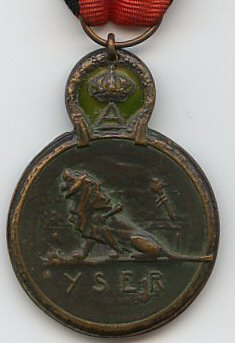
- Medal reverse Ribbon bar

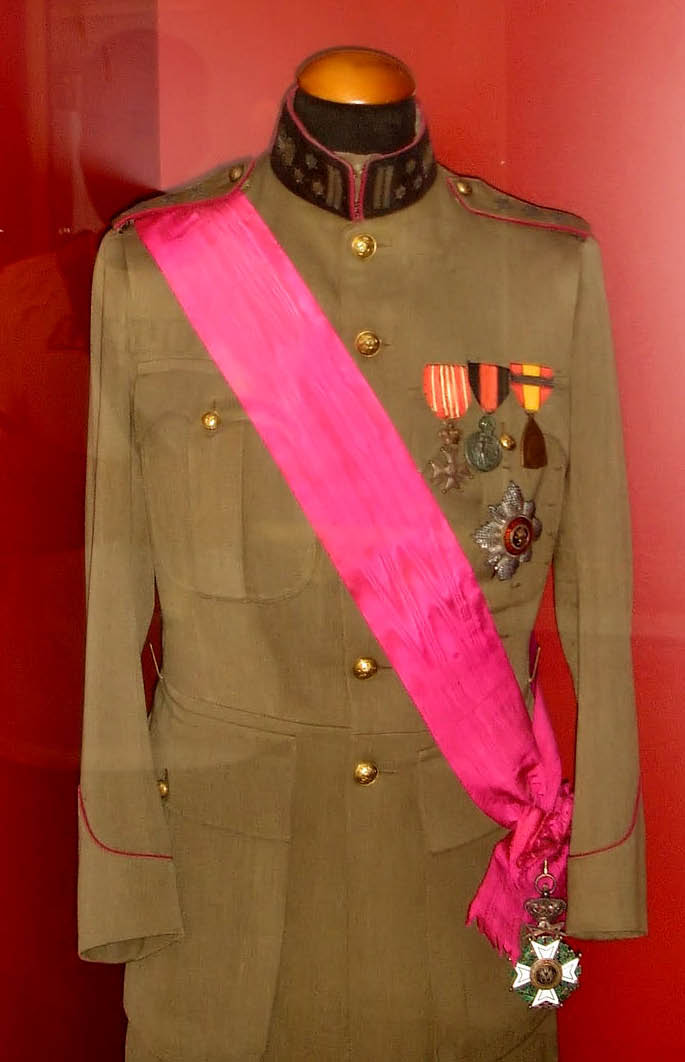
Uniform of the King with the Yser Medal

The Yser Medal (French: Médaille de l'Yser, Dutch: Medaille van de IJzer) was a Belgian campaign medal of World War I, established on 18 October 1918 to denote distinguished service during the 1914 Battle of the Yser in which the Belgian Army stopped the German advance of the German invasion of Belgium.

== Statute ==
The Yser Medal was awarded to the members of the Belgian Armed Forces who were part of the army fighting along the Yser river between 17 and 31 October 1914 that proved themselves worthy of the distinction. The medal could also be awarded to foreign nationals, members of allied military forces who took part in the Battle of the Yser. The medal could be awarded posthumously.

The Yser Medal was worn on the left side of the chest and when in the presence of other awards of Belgium, was placed directly after the Croix de Guerre (War Cross).

== Medal description ==
The Yser medal was a 35 mm in diameter circular medal struck from bronze and surmounted by a smaller diameter green enameled medallion. The obverse bore a nude, helmeted man holding a lance (indicating the halting of the advance of the German forces), to his right, the relief inscription on three lines "17-31 OCT 1914". In the enameled medallion, the relief inscription "YSER". The reverse bore the relief image of the left side of a roaring wounded lion lying on the bank of the Yser river, an arrow in his left shoulder, below the lion, the relief inscription "YSER", in the medallion, the Belgian royal crown over the relief letter "A", the monogram of King Albert.

The medal was suspended by a ring through the suspension loop to a red silk moiré ribbon with wide black edge stripes. The red denoting the spilled blood, the black denoting the mourning.

== Notable recipients (partial list) ==
The individuals listed below were awarded the Yser medal:

- King Albert I of Belgium.
- Aviator Lieutenant Colonel Baron Willy Coppens
- Lieutenant General Alphonse Ferdinand Tromme
- Lieutenant General Jules Joseph Pire
- Cavalry Lieutenant General Sir Maximilien de Neve de Roden
- Cavalry Lieutenant General Baron Victor Van Strijdonck de Burkel
- Lieutenant General Georges Deffontaine
- Lieutenant General Baron Raoul de Hennin de Boussu-Walcourt
- Lieutenant General Joseph Leroy
- Lieutenant General Robert Oor
- Lieutenant General Libert Elie Thomas
- Lieutenant General Léon Bievez
- Cavalry Major General Baron Beaudoin de Maere d’Aertrycke
- Major General Jean Buysse
- Major General Paul Jacques
- Police Lieutenant General Louis Joseph Leroy
- Police Lieutenant General Oscar-Eugène Dethise
- Chaplain General Louis Kerremans
- Lieutenant General Harry Jungbluth
- Cavalry Lieutenant General Baron Albert du Roy de Blicquy
- Lieutenant General Baron Émile Dossin de Saint-Georges
- Lieutenant General Baron Honoré Drubbel
- Lieutenant General Victor Bertrand
- Lieutenant General Baron Jules Jacques de Dixmude
- Lieutenant General Georges Guiette
- Lieutenant General Albert Lantonnois van Rode
- Lieutenant General Baron Armand de Ceuninck
- Lieutenant General Aloïs Biebuyck
- Cavalry Lieutenant General Baron Léon de Witte de Haelen
- Cavalry Lieutenant General Vicount Victor Buffin de Chosal
- Cavalry Lieutenant General Jules De Blauwe
- Major General Doctor Antoine Depage
- Lieutenant General Baron Ferdinand de Posch
- Cavalry Lieutenant General Count André de Jonghe d’Ardoye

== Yser Cross ==
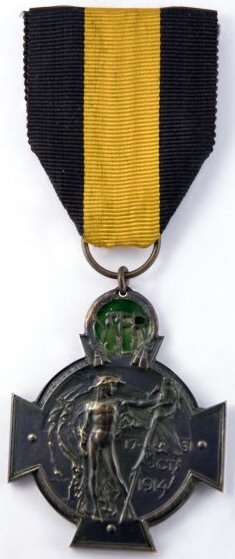
Yser Cross with the Flemish ribbon

The Yser Medal was replaced by the Yser Cross (French: Croix de l'Yser, Dutch: Kruis van de IJzer) in 1934. The cross was of similar design to the medal displaying the same obverse and reverse except that it was in the form of a cross pattée. The Yser Cross was issued as a replacement to the earlier Yser Medal upon application and payment of a fee, consequently relatively few were issued as few veterans wanted to trade in their medal, and even fewer wanted to pay the fee. The Yser Medal and the Yser Cross could not be worn together, it was one or the other. Although issued with the same black and red ribbon as the Yser medal, many Flemish recipients opted for an unofficial black and yellow ribbon identifying them as Dutch speaking Belgians.

== See also ==
- Race to the Sea
- Orders, decorations, and medals of Belgium

== Other sources ==
- Quinot H., 1950, Recueil illustré des décorations belges et congolaises, 4e Edition. (Hasselt)
- Cornet R., 1982, Recueil des dispositions légales et réglementaires régissant les ordres nationaux belges. 2e Ed. N.pl., (Brussels)
- Borné A.C., 1985, Distinctions honorifiques de la Belgique, 1830-1985 (Brussels)
