= Fire Cross 1914–1918 =

1914–1918 Fire Cross
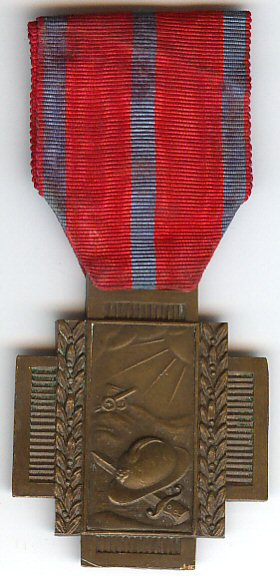
- 1914–1918 Fire Cross (obverse)
- Type: Military combat service medal
- Awarded for: World War 1 combat service in the Belgian Armed Forces
- Presented by: Kingdom of Belgium
- Eligibility: Belgian citizens and foreign nationals
- Status: No longer awarded
- Established: 6 February 1934
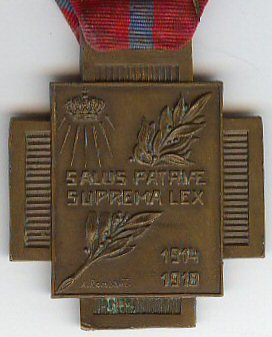
- Reverse Ribbon bar

Precedence
- Next (higher): Yser Medal

The 1914 – 1918 Fire Cross (Dutch: Vuurkruis 1914–1918, French: Croix du Feu 1914–1918) was a Belgian military decoration awarded to all holders of the so-called "Fire Card" which was awarded to all who came under fire at the front for at least 32 months during the First World War. The medal was established by royal decree on 6 February 1934. It could not be awarded posthumously.

== Award description ==
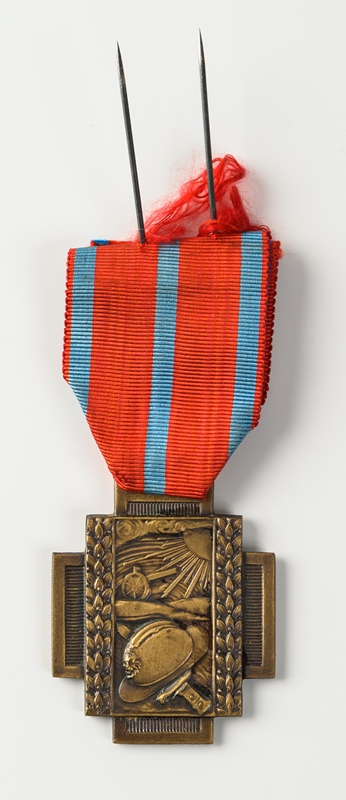
Fire Cross with alternative rendering of the obverse design

The Fire Cross was a 44 mm wide by 54 mm high (including ribbon loop) bronze cross quadrate. Except for a 3 mm wide plain border, the cross arms were striated, horizontally for the lateral arms and vertically for the vertical arms on both the obverse and reverse. The 30 mm wide by 37 mm high central rectangle bore on its obverse, 5mm wide vertical laurel branches on either side, at center, the relief image of a deserted battlefield with at the forefront, the relief image of a World War 1 Belgian helmet over a bayonet, farther and on a slight elevation at left, a 75 mm howitzer, at upper right, the Sun breaking through clouds. On its reverse, a large laurel branch extending diagonally from bottom left to top right and bisected by the relief inscription on two lines in Latin "SALUS PATRIAE SUPREMA LEX" roughly translating into "THE NATION'S SALVATION IS OUR HIGHEST DUTY". In the top left corner, a royal crown from which seven relief rays extend downwards, at bottom right, the relief years on two rows "1914" and "1918", at bottom left just below the laurel branch's stem, the name of the awards designer, "A. Rombaut".

The cross hangs from a 36mm wide red silk moiré ribbon with three 4 mm wide longitudinal blue stripes, one at centre, the other two on either side 1 mm from the ribbon's edges.

== Notable recipients (partial list) ==
The individuals listed below were awarded the Fire Cross:

- Aviator Lieutenant Colonel Baron Willy Coppens
- Lieutenant General Alphonse Ferdinand Tromme
- Major General Maurice Jacmart
- Lieutenant General Jean-Baptiste Piron
- Lieutenant General Jules Joseph Pire
- Cavalry Lieutenant General Sir Maximilien de Neve de Roden
- Cavalry Lieutenant General Baron Victor Van Strijdonck de Burkel
- Lieutenant General Georges Deffontaine
- Lieutenant General Alphonse Verstraete
- Lieutenant General Baron Raoul de Hennin de Boussu-Walcourt
- Lieutenant General Joseph Leroy
- Cavalry Lieutenant General Jules De Boeck
- Lieutenant General Fernand Vanderhaeghen
- Lieutenant General Robert Oor
- Lieutenant General Libert Elie Thomas
- Lieutenant General Léon Bievez
- Cavalry Major General Baron Beaudoin de Maere d’Aertrycke
- Major General Paul Jacques
- Chaplain General Louis Kerremans
- Lieutenant General Baron Armand de Ceuninck
- Lieutenant General Aloïs Biebuyck
- Cavalry Lieutenant General Vicount Victor Buffin de Chosal
- Lieutenant General Doctor Edmond François Durré
- Baron Joseph van der Elst
- Governor Jacques Delvaux de Fenffe
- Warrant Officer Georges Lemaître

== See also ==
- Orders, decorations, and medals of Belgium

== Other sources ==
- Quinot H., 1950, Recueil illustré des décorations belges et congolaises, 4e Edition. (Hasselt)
- Cornet R., 1982, Recueil des dispositions légales et réglementaires régissant les ordres nationaux belges. 2e Ed. N.pl., (Brussels)
- Borné A.C., 1985, Distinctions honorifiques de la Belgique, 1830–1985 (Brussels)
