= Centenary of National Independence Commemorative Medal =

Medal

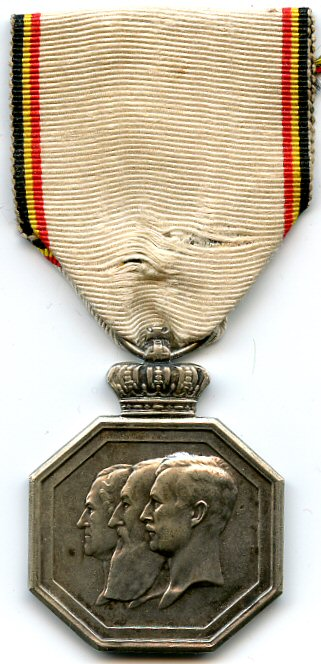
- Centenary of National Independence Commemorative Medal (obverse)
- Type: Commemorative medal
- Awarded for: Twenty years of state service prior to 1 January 1931
- Presented by: Kingdom of Belgium
- Eligibility: Civil servants, veterans and serving members of the Belgian Armed Forces
- Status: No longer awarded
- Established: 20 July 1930

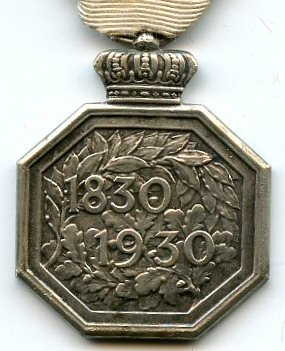
Reverse of the medal

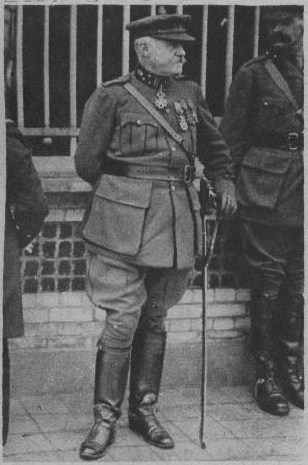
Lieutenant General Félix Wielemans, a recipient of the Centenary of National Independence Commemorative Medal

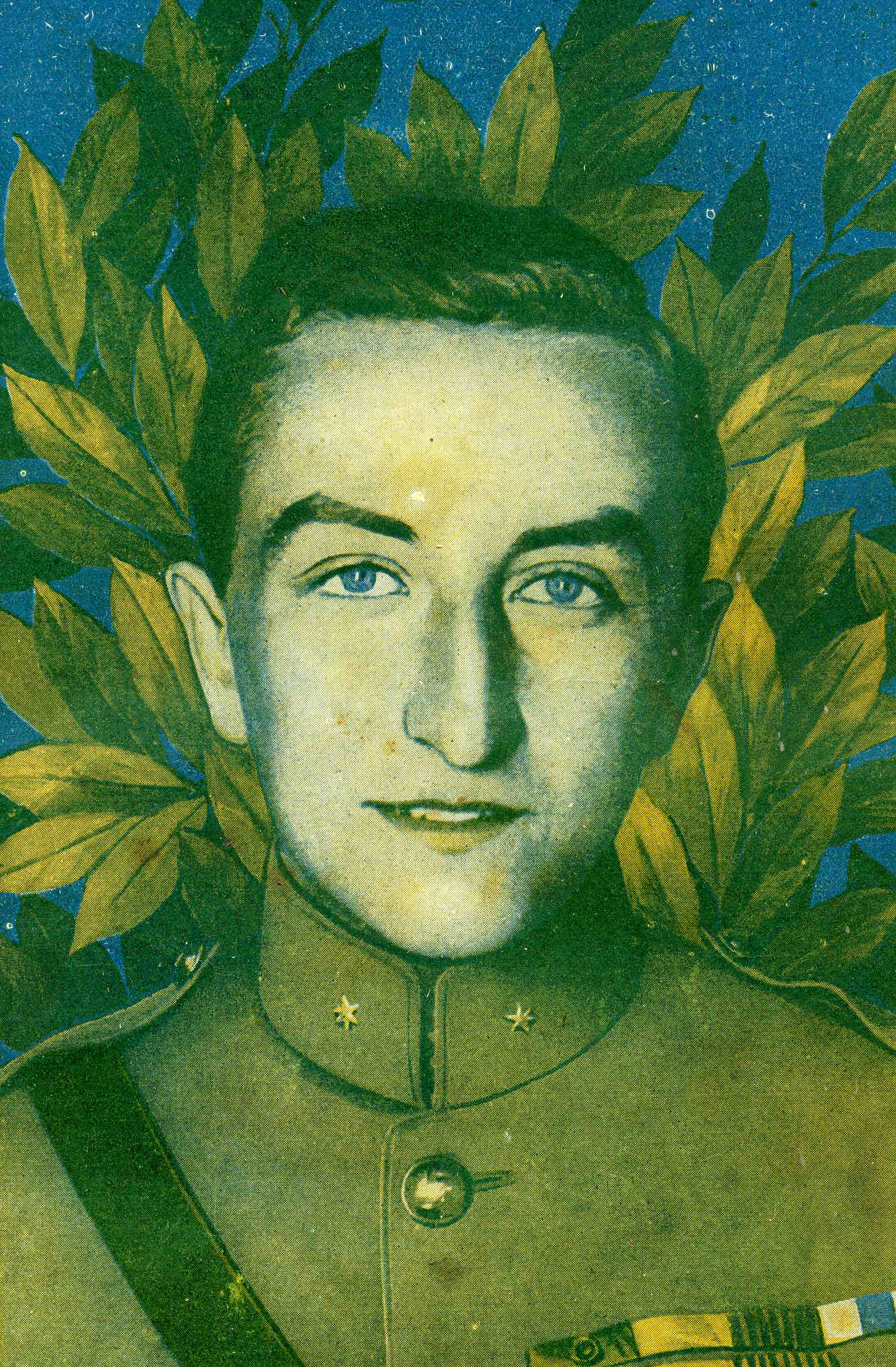
Lieutenant Colonel Baron Willy Coppens, a recipient of the Centenary of National Independence Commemorative Medal

The Centenary of National Independence Commemorative Medal 1830-1930 (French: Médaille Commémorative du Centenaire de l'Indépendance Nationale 1830-1930, Dutch: Herinneringsmedaille van 100 Jaars de Onafhankelijkheid 1830-1930) was a Belgian commemorative medal established by royal decree on 20 July 1930 to commemorate the 100th anniversary of Belgian independence.

It was awarded to serving members of the Belgian Armed Forces and to veterans of the service as well as to civil servants who served honourably for twenty years or more prior to 1 January 1931 and who were thus eligible for the Civic Decoration for long service, the Military Cross or the Military Decoration.

== Award description ==
The Centenary of National Independence Commemorative Medal was a 32mm wide by 30mm high silvered bronze octagon surmounted by a crown giving it a total height of 41mm. Its obverse bore the left facing profiles of kings Leopold I, Leopold II and Albert I of Belgium. The reverse bore the relief years "1830" and "1930" on two rows slightly offset from center superimposed over oak and laurel leaves.

The medal was suspended by a ring through a suspension loop from a white 38mm wide silk moiré ribbon with the national colours of Belgium as 3mm wide edge stripes (1mm black, 1mm yellow and 1mm red).

== Noteworthy recipients (partial list) ==
The individuals listed below were awarded the Centenary of National Independence Commemorative Medal:

- Aviator Lieutenant Colonel Baron Willy Coppens
- Lieutenant General Alphonse Ferdinand Tromme
- Lieutenant General Jean-Baptiste Piron
- Lieutenant General Jules Joseph Pire
- Cavalry Lieutenant General Sir Maximilien de Neve de Roden
- Cavalry Lieutenant General Baron Victor van Strydonck de Burkel
- Lieutenant General Georges Deffontaine
- Lieutenant General Alphonse Verstraete
- Lieutenant General Baron Raoul de Hennin de Boussu-Walcourt
- Lieutenant General Joseph Leroy
- Cavalry Lieutenant General Jules De Boeck
- Lieutenant General Fernand Vanderhaeghen
- Lieutenant General Robert Oor
- Lieutenant General Libert Elie Thomas
- Lieutenant General Léon Bievez
- Cavalry Major General Baron Beaudoin de Maere d’Aertrycke
- Major General Lucien Van Hoof
- Major General Jean Buysse
- Major General Paul Jacques
- Commodore Georges Timmermans
- Aviator Major General Norbert Leboutte
- Police Lieutenant General Louis Joseph Leroy
- Police Lieutenant General Oscar-Eugène Dethise
- Cavalry Lieutenant General Baron Albert du Roy de Blicquy
- Lieutenant General Sir Antonin de Selliers de Moranville
- Lieutenant General Félix Wielemans
- Lieutenant General Baron Émile Dossin de Saint-Georges
- Lieutenant General Victor Bertrand
- Lieutenant General Baron Armand de Ceuninck
- Lieutenant General Aloïs Biebuyck
- Cavalry Lieutenant General Baron Léon de Witte de Haelen
- Cavalry Lieutenant General Vicount Victor Buffin de Chosal
- Cavalry Lieutenant General Jules De Blauwe
- Lieutenant General Baron Ferdinand de Posch
- Cavalry Lieutenant General Count André de Jonghe d’Ardoye
- Ambassador Esquire Bernard de l’Escaille de Lier
- Governor Baron Raymond de Kerchove d’Exaerde
- Governor Camille Count de Briey Baron de Landres
- Count Edmond Carton de Wiart
- Ambassador Jacques Delvaux de Fenffe
- Count Hubert Pierlot
- August de Schryver
- Count Beaudoin de Lichtervelde

== See also ==
- Belgian Revolution
- Orders, decorations, and medals of Belgium

== Other sources ==
- Quinot H., 1950, Recueil illustré des décorations belges et congolaises, 4e Edition. (Hasselt)
- Cornet R., 1982, Recueil des dispositions légales et réglementaires régissant les ordres nationaux belges. 2e Ed. N.pl., (Brussels)
- Borné A.C., 1985, Distinctions honorifiques de la Belgique, 1830-1985 (Brussels)
