= Medal of Belgian Gratitude =

Medal of Belgian Gratitude 1940-1945
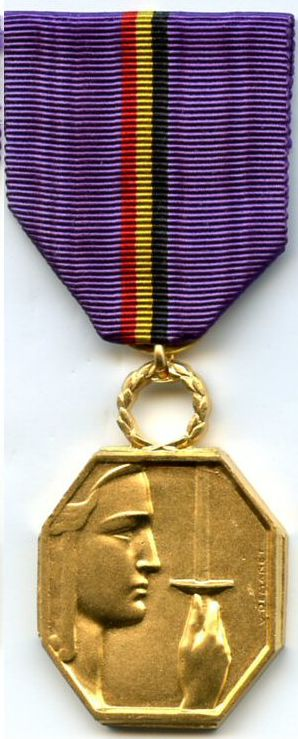
- Medal of Belgian gratitude
- Type: Military decoration
- Awarded for: Display of humanitarian patriotism by acts of courage
- Presented by: Kingdom of Belgium
- Eligibility: Belgian or foreign civilians
- Clasps: Red cross, embedded in the medal
- Status: Dormant
- Established: 1 August 1945
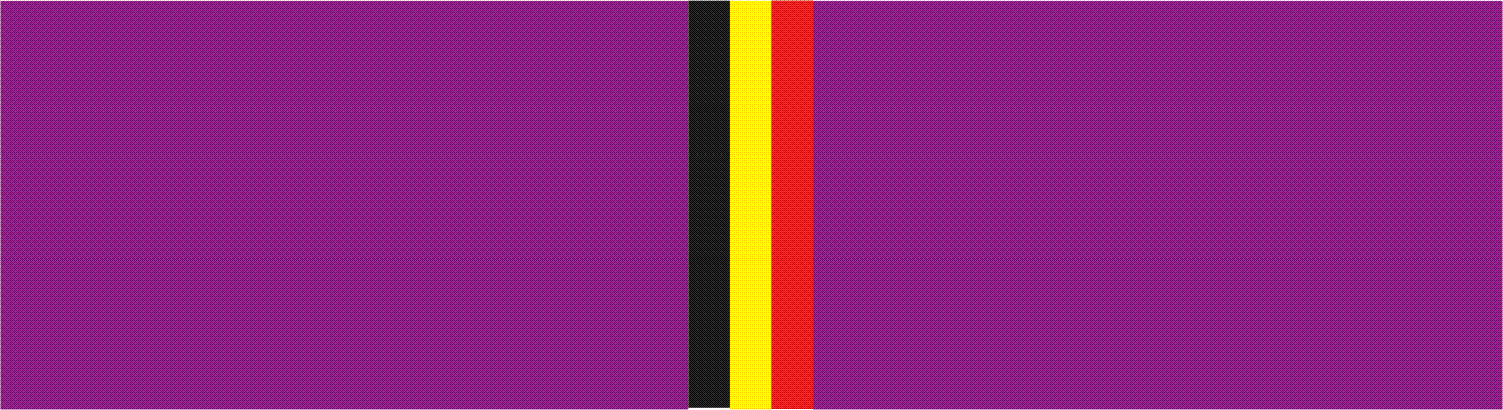
- Ribbon

Precedence
- Next (higher): Queen Elisabeth Medal
- Next (lower): Volunteer combatant medal WW I

The Medal of Belgian Gratitude (French: Médaille de la Reconnaissance Belge; Dutch: Belgische erkentelijkheidsmedaille) is a Belgian medal instituted to be awarded to civilians on 1 August 1945.

== Insignia ==
The medal measures 34 mm in diameter and has an octagonal shape. The obverse depicts a veiled woman (representing Belgium) facing to the right, with a rapier in her right hand, raised in salute. The medal came in 3 versions: gold, silver and bronze.

The reverse bears the inscription “PATRIA GRATA 1940 1945” with a decorative pattern on either side of the inscription. The medal is attached to the ribbon via a laurel wreath. The laurel wreath is open in the center. However, the wreath is filled with a red cross when it is awarded for meritorious service during the administration of aid to the sick or the wounded (Dutch: voor verdienstelijke daden bij hulpverlening aan zieken of gekwetsten).

The ribbon is purple, with 3 central stripes of black, yellow and red, the colors of the Belgian national flag.

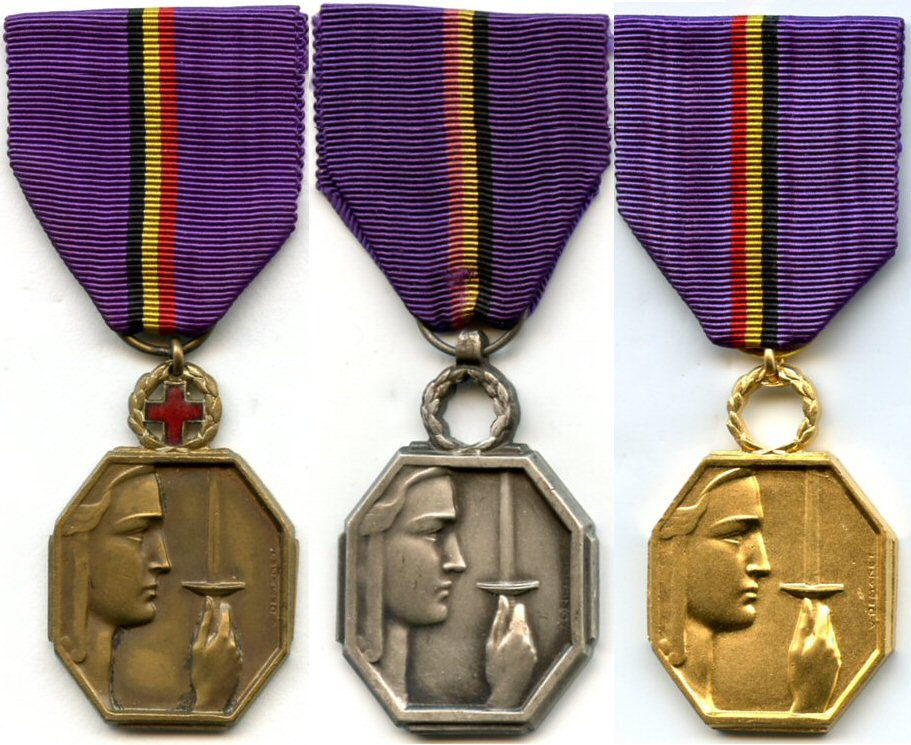

Medal of Belgian gratitude in gold, silver and bronze, with and without red enamel cross

== Award conditions ==
The medal of Belgian gratitude was awarded for devotion to philanthropy in order to relieve people from the depravations of the war (Dutch: menslievende instellingen tot leniging van oorlogsnood).

== Notable recipients (partial list) ==
- The gold medal was awarded to the Dutch town of Vught as a token of gratitude towards its citizens for their acts of compassion towards the Belgian political prisoners held in nearby Herzogenbusch concentration camp.

== See also ==
- Orders, decorations, and medals of Belgium
- Belgian honours order of wearing
