= Centenary Medal (disambiguation) =

The Centenary Medal was an award created by the Australian Government in 2001 regarding the Centenary of Federation of Australia.

It may also refer to:

- Centenary Medal (RPS), a medal awarded by the Royal Photographic Society, in recognition of a sustained, significant contribution to the art of photography
- Centenary Medal (Prussia), was a medal awarded by Prussia, formally known as the Kaiser Wilhelm Memorial Medal, on the occasion of the 100th Birthday of Emperor Wilhelm I.
- Centenary Medal (Ireland), formally known as the 1916 Centenary Commemorative Medal, was a military award by the Irish Government, on occasion of the 100th anniversary of the Easter Rising
- Centenary of National Independence Commemorative Medal, was a Belgian commemorative medal to commemorate the 100th anniversary of Belgian independence
- David Livingstone Centenary Medal, a medal awarded by the American Geographical Society for scientific achievements in the field of geography of the Southern Hemisphere
