= Albert Devèze =

Belgian politician (1881–1959)

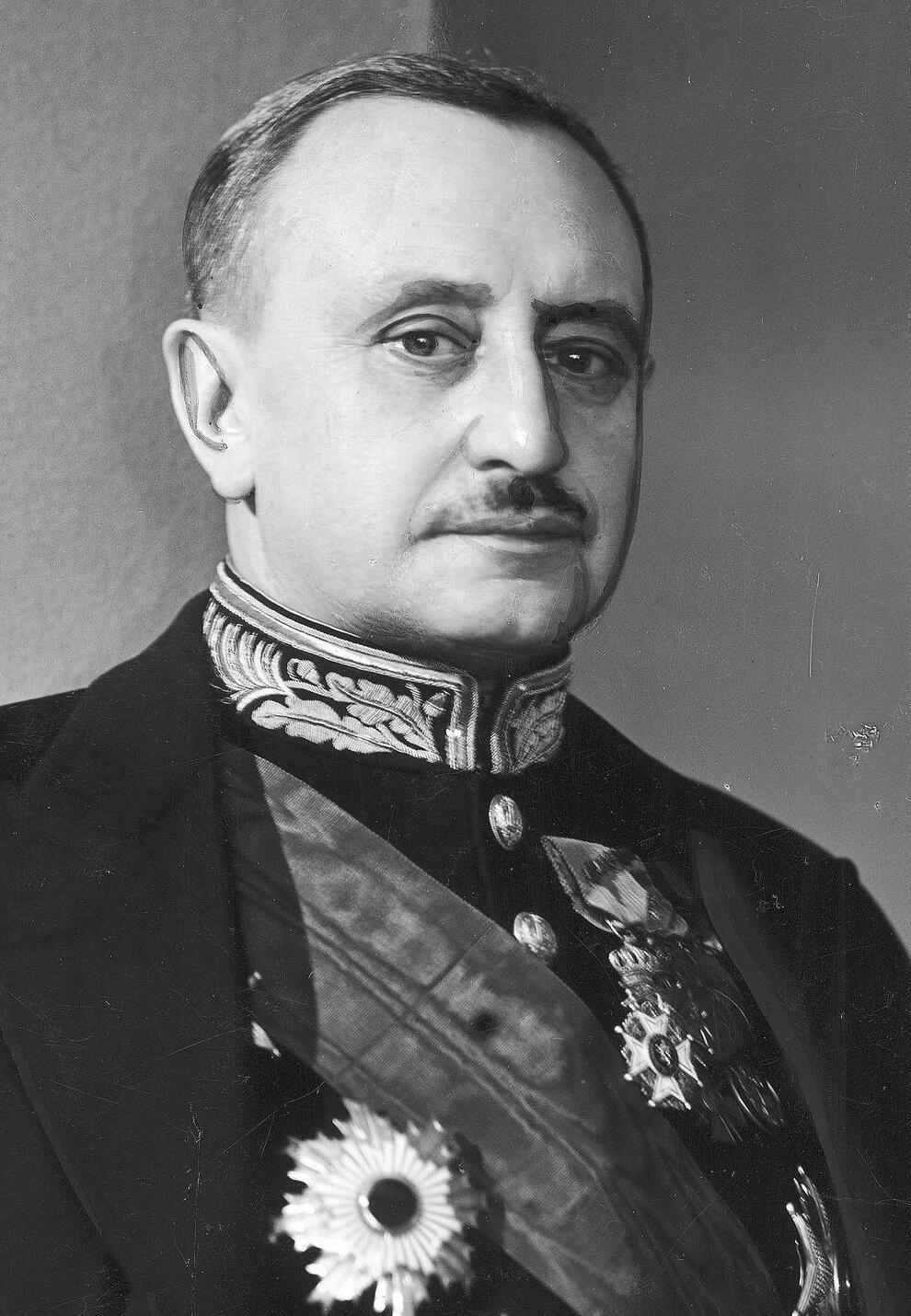

Minister of National Defence of Belgium
- In office 11 August 1949 – 6 June 1950
- Prime Minister: Gaston Eyskens
- Preceded by: Raoul de Fraiteur
- Succeeded by: Henri Moreau de Melen
- In office 29 November 1934 – 13 June 1936
- Prime Minister: Georges Theunis; Paul Van Zeeland
- Preceded by: Georges Theunis
- Succeeded by: Henri Denis
- In office 20 November 1920 – 6 August 1923
- Prime Minister: Henry Carton de Wiart; Georges Theunis
- Preceded by: Fulgence Masson
- Succeeded by: Albert Hellebaut

Minister of Economic Affairs of Belgium
- In office 31 March 1946 – 3 August 1946
- Prime Minister: Achille van Acker
- Preceded by: Léon-Éli Troclet
- Succeeded by: Henri Liebaert

Minister of the Interior of Belgium
- In office 18 April 1939 – 23 August 1940
- Prime Minister: Hubert Pierlot
- Preceded by: Willem Eekelers
- Succeeded by: Edmond Ronse

Personal details
- Born: Albert Joseph Charles Devèze; 6 June 1881 Ypres, Belgium
- Died: 28 November 1959 (aged 78) Brussels, Belgium
- Party: Liberal Party
- Occupation: Politician, lawyer

Albert Joseph Charles Devèze (French: [dəvɛz]; 6 June 1881 – 28 November 1959) was a Belgian liberal politician and minister.

== Biography ==
Devèze was a doctor in law and a lawyer. A member of the Liberal Party, he was a municipality council member in Schaerbeek and in Ixelles and a member of parliament for the district of Brussels (1912–1939 and 1946–1958) and for the district of Verviers (1939–1946). Devèze was President of the Liberal Party in 1927–1932 and minister of defense (1920–1923, 1932–1936 and 1949–1950), vice prime-minister (1949–1950), minister of interior (1939–1940) and of economy (1946). In 1930, he became minister of state.

== Sources ==
- Presidents of the Belgian Liberal Party
