= Border Cyclists Battalion of Limburg (Belgium) =

Border Cyclists Battalion of Limburg (Limburg Battalion)
- Active: 1940
- Disbanded: 29 May 1940
- Country: Belgium
- Branch: Belgian Army
- Type: Reconnaissance Battalion
- Role: Reconnaissance
- Size: Battalion
- Part of: None
- Garrison/HQ: Limburg
- Engagements: Battle of Belgium (World War II)

The Border Cyclists Battalion of Limburg (Cyclistes Bataillon du Limburg) was a Cyclist Battalion that was active in the Battle of Belgium. It fought against the German Armed Forces at several key moments but ultimately, the battle was lost.

== World War II ==
As a unit during peacetime, the Border Cyclists Battalion Limburg, shortened to Limburg Battalion, was a modernized part of the Belgian Army(excluding the Cyclists), unlike most of the second reserve. The Battalion was one of the first to mobilize in 1938 in the barracks of Limburg, where they would get their name from.(Although recruitment efforts from this battalion already began since 1934, 1938 was when they fully mobilized with all their companies.)They earned a reputation in 1940 for capturing two German Majors, and found multiple documents specifically detailing the German attack. As a result, the Belgians had possibly delayed the German planners as they hurried to switch up the tactics and strategy.

When hostilities began again on May 10, 1940, the Limburg Battalion was still in training at Camp Beverlo. They quickly gathered as much supplies and went back towards the Albert Canal, the main defense. Only a small rearguard was to delay the German attack.

When arriving at the Albert Canal, the Battalion was split, with all the units located at strategic junctions along the canal. These areas were apparently targets for the German bombers as casualties were mounting. The Limburg Battalion is still holding most bridges across the Albert Canal. Yet delays also occur as the High Command doesn't allow anti aircraft guns to open fire until the enemy forces gather and severely bomb the area.

By May 11, the Albert Canal was barely holding and the Limburg Battalion regrouped near Tongeren. They become under the full command of 7th Infantry Division. And so, they participated in the breach of the Albert Canal, as the whole front fell back.

Delays occur in many ways as the retreat was rather chaotic although the French have started establishing themselves south of Tongeren. By then, a passage to France was denied. Most of the other Cyclists Battalions have gone earlier. Discipline was not in sight and the retreat to the K-W line went even worse. Lone companies broke away. When they finally regrouped, one company had only one operational anti aircraft weapon and the remaining fighting men were down just to a platoon.

After another day manning the K-W line, the Limburg Battalion announces its withdrawal from the front and will move west. The move began well with the battalion reaching to Beigem after a day of marching. They hear of the front falling back from the K-W line, and so, the Battalion will be back in combat to cover for the retreating units.

Regrouping once more, this time the reorganization went well, with several contingents of the Battalion previously thought to have deserted, arriving at Moorsel along with the main battalion. The battalion comes under the command of I Corp.

The Limburg Battalion retreats back to Ghent. The cyclists went from Aalst to Ghent and the ground troops were picked up by reserve trucks. The Limburg Battalion was now mainly composed of Infantrymen due to the lack of Cycles. The day was spent with more reorganization.

As part of the evacuation of the K-W line, the Limburg Battalion was split into three units, each assigned to a specific regiment of the 4th Infantry Division.

By May 18, the Border Cyclists Battalion Limburg was still a part of 4th Infantry Division although now they weren't divided into 3 units. They were positioned at Bruggenhoofd Gent awaiting the arrival of the 2nd and 5th Infantry Divisions. But pressure is steadily increasing.

On May 20, a massive breach in the Scheldt Canal was made as the Limburg Battalion was recalled to its defense. Along with the 16ID Cyclists, they manage to halt the German advance, then the artillery heavily bombarded the German lines.

Now under the command of I Corp once again, the Limburg Battalion regathers its forces and renews supplies. With the support of the 16ID and 18ID Cyclists, the Limburg Battalion reopens a front, allowing the Infantry to further retreat west and south.

As soon as the Infantry have pull away, the Cyclists broke down the bridges and also retreated west. The Limburg Battalion was the last to retreat and position themselves west of the Lye Diversion Canal.

Becoming part of the Cyclists of the Leroy Group, the Limburg Battalion suffered heavy casualties as they were part of the front flanks with only a platoon available to relieve a company of troops. Also suffering heavily from artillery, the discipline of the Leroy Group broke.

The commanding officers of all the companies of the Limburg Battalion were taken as prisoners of war which left the Limburg Battalion completely leaderless. The Germans, with their superiority in numbers and structure, pushed the front back. Eventually, the Germans were halted with the support of the 9th Line Regiment which arrived from I Corp and the 10th Infantry Division.

Because of the small amount of troops that came to report on May 25, the Leroy Group effectively disbanded. Asking for reinforcements from 10th Infantry Division, the Limburg Battalion only managed to regain a handful of their personnel and cyclists back, 200 in total.

By now, even the 10th Infantry Division was weakened from the impeding German pressure. After the entire Belgian front fell back once more, division after division surrendered to the Germans. With no hope of Allied counterattacks, the Border Cyclists Battalion Limburg also had to lay down their weapons. The remaining units that still are classed as Cyclists handed over their bicycles on May 29, one day before Belgian Surrender was announced official.

Unlike most other independent Cyclist units (units that aren't organic to any divisions, regiments, etc..) the Border Cyclists Battalion Limburg was a flexible reserve for the Belgian Army, but delays and breaking discipline eventually strained the Battalion to its limits.

== Structure 1940 ==
Structure of the Battalion at the eve of the Battle of Belgium

- Headquarters, at Limburg Barracks
- Commanding Officer, Limburg Battalion -Lieutenant- Colonel Marcel Geniesse

Detachment Kaulille

- 1st Company Cyclists (Commanding Officer, Lieutenant George Fraeys)
- 2nd Company Cyclists (Commanding Officer, Captain Albert Leroy; also commander of Leroy Group)

Detachment Maaseik

- 3rd Company Cyclists (Commanding Officer, Lieutenant Xavier Haenen)
- 4th Company Cyclists (Commanding Officer, Lieutenant Camille Lebon)

Detachment Lanaken

- 5th Company Cyclists (Commanding Officer, Lieutenant/Captain Henri Giddelo)
- 6th Company Cyclists (Commanding Officer, Lieutenant Viktor Leeuwerck)

== See also ==
- Border Cyclists Battalion (Transferred to France)
- K-W line
- 10th Infantry Division
- 4th Infantry Division
- 16th Infantry Division
