= Armand De Ceuninck =

Belgium Army general

Armand de Ceuninck
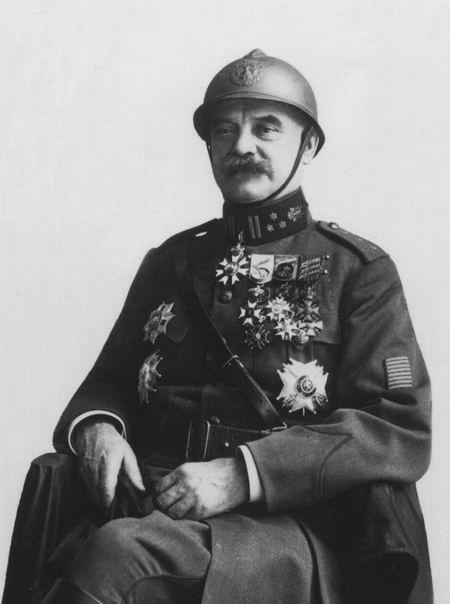

Minister of War of Belgium
- In office 4 August 1917 – 22 November 1918
- Monarch: Albert I
- Preceded by: Charles de Broqueville
- Succeeded by: Fulgence Masson

Personal details
- Born: 27 May 1858 Mechelen, Belgium
- Died: 12 April 1935 (aged 76) Brussels, Belgium

Armand Léopold Théodore, Baron de Ceuninck (27 May 1858 – 12 April 1935) was the Minister of War of Belgium, serving in the last year of World War I.

== Biography ==
He entered the army in 1871, became an artillery sergeant in 1874, then entered the artillery and engineering section of the Royal Military College. A sub-lieutenant of artillery in 1880, he was named General-staff adjutant (adjoint d'état-major) and, in 1893, passed out as captain in the cadre spécial d'état-major.

At the outbreak of World War I he was staff colonel and head of the staff section of the army. In this position he assumed the heavy yet delicate task imposed by mobilisation and the putting of the army on a war footing.

Promoted to major-general on 6 September 1914, he was placed at the head of the 18th Mixed Brigade (Grenadiers), of which he took command on 9 September at the moment when the unit was conducting operations around Antwerp. He took an active part in operations, and confirmed himself as an energetic and resolute leader, notably at Wakkerzeel. His brigade then occupied for a fortnight the sector from Lier Fort to Koningshooikt Fort, then was transferred to the Liezele Fort – Puurs Redoubt sector when the Germans begun their attack on Antwerp.

When the epic retreat to the Yser River was ordered, Major-General de Ceuninck and his troops were encharged with covering the flanks of the divisions retreating westwards. Following the general movement of the army, he moved his brigade to Diksmude, then, after a short rest, he was directed to the region of Lizerne, to organise defensive positions on the Yser Canal.

During the Battle of the Yser, the two regiments of grenadiers and the artillery of de Ceuninck's brigade were engaged in the most murderous actions. After the Allied victory in this battle, de Ceuninck was encharged with occupying the Oostkerke sector, where he had under his command a half-battalion of French Fusiliers Marins. On 4 December 1914 he retook the sector at Diksmuide.

On 5 January 1915, he was named commander of the 6th Division of the Army by King Albert.

At the beginning of March, de Ceuninck retook the Drie Grachten – Maison du Passeur sector, which spread as far as Steenstraet, where the Belgians were in contact with French troops.

On 22 April came the Second Battle of Ypres, notable for the first German gas attacks. After the battle, French President Poincare and General Joffre congratulated the Belgian troops and awarded de Ceuninck the cross of commander of the Legion d'Honneur.

Promoted Lieutenant-General on 20 August 1915, de Ceuninck was subsequently made Minister of War on 4 August 1917, replacing Charles de Broqueville. Yet de Ceuninck did not quit the front, but moved the ministry to him at Veurne. He dedicated all his efforts to equip the army with all materials and equipment necessary for it to always fight in the best conditions. His concerns were also constantly occupied with the material welfare and morale of the officers and soldiers with whom he had fought for three years. He endeavoured to recognize the rights of Flemish troops, including the right to speak to their superiors in Flemish. De Ceuninck was a fluent Flemish speaker, made speeches to his troops in Flemish, and encouraged all soldiers in a speech on 15 September to learn the language.

Relieved of his ministerial functions on 22 November 1918, at the same time as all the members of the government returned to the country, de Ceuninck returned to the leadership of the 4th Division, which was part of the Allied occupation forces in Germany. King Albert awarded him the Grand Ribbon of the Order of Leopold in 1919. In 1920, Lieutenant-General Baron de Ceuninck was part of the Belgian Commission on disarmament at the League of Nations.

== Positions held ==
de Ceuninck held the following positions:

- Section Chief of General Staff of the Army, 1912–1914.
- Commander of the 18th Mixed Brigade, 1914–1915.
- Commander of the 6th Division of the Army, 1915–1917.
- Minister of War, 1917–1918.
- Commander of the 4th Division of the Army, 1918–1920.
- Lieutenant-General of Artillery.

== Medals and awards ==
=== Belgian honours ===
- Belgium: Grand Cordon of the Order of Leopold with Palm, RD of 1919.
- Belgium: Grand Officer of the Order of the Crown with Palm,
- Belgium: Croix de Guerre 1914–1918 with Palms,
- Belgium: Yser Medal,
- Belgium: Fire Cross 1914–1918,
- Belgium: Commemorative Medal of the 1914–1918 War,
- Belgium: Victory Medal 1914–1918,
- Belgium: Military Cross First Class,
- Belgium: Commemorative Medal of the Reign of King Leopold II,
- Belgium: Centenary of National Independence Commemorative Medal.

=== Foreign honours ===
- Grand Cross of the Order of the White Eagle with Crossed Swords of Serbia,
- Grand Cross of the Royal Victorian Order of Great Britain,
- Grand Cross of the Order of the Rising Sun of Japan,
- Grand Cross of the Order of the Crown of Italy,
- Grand Officer of the Order of the Bath of Great Britain,
- Grand Officer of the Order of St. Michael and St. George of Great Britain,
- Grand Officer of the Order of the Legion of Honour of France,
- Grand Officer of the Order of Military Merit of Spain,
- Commander of the Order of St. Maurice and St. Lazarus of Italy,
- Commander of the Order of Orange-Nassau of the Netherlands,
- Commander of the Order of the Star of Romania
- Commander of the Order of Vasa of Sweden,
- Officer of the Order of Merit of Chile,
- Medal for Military Merit in Silver, Italy,
- Distinguished Service Medal, United States
- Croix de Guerre 1914–1918 with Palm, France.
