= Border Cyclists Battalion (Belgium) =

- Active: 1940
- Disbanded: 6 June 1940
- Country: Belgium
- Branch: Belgian Army
- Type: Reconnaissance Battalion
- Role: Reconnaissance
- Size: Battalion
- Part of: None
- Garrison/HQ: Charleroi
- Engagements: Battle of Belgium (World War II)

The Border Cyclists Battalion (Bataillion de Cyclistes) was a reserve class Cyclist Battalion of the Belgian Army that fought in the Battle of Belgium against the German Armed Forces. Transferred to France, they also took a small part in the Battle of France.

== World War II ==
During the late mobilization period in mid 1940, a Border Cyclist Battalion unit was established and was supposed to be a supporting battalion-sized detachment for the 1st and the 2nd Border Cyclists Regiments. Before the fighting began, the unit was deployed at Charleroi, which was also a base for the Ardennes Hunters.

When hostilities, and eventual attack from the Germans arrived on May 10, the Border Cyclists Battalion took over all the border containments of East Flanders. The unit was forwarded and was sent to take positions in the village of De Klinge. Multiple reserve classes that were poorly organized and led were sent to reinforce the Border Cyclists Battalion as they were on the march.

On the next day, the Border Cyclists Battalion arrived at their destination, and the units go to there positions. Out of approximately 650 soldiers sent to reinforce the Battalion, only 300 arrive, some without their equipment.

By May 13, just 3 days into the German invasion, the Border Cyclists Battalion, along with its counterparts (excluding the regiments) and some of the Ardennes Hunters, were sent south to France. (The strategic purpose of such a move is still unclear as the Albert Canal was still holding the Germans back.) Less than half of the Cyclists were allowed to aboard multiple trains that were headed for France, due to the lack of space. The 2nd mixed company was one of these Cyclist forces. They were a contingent of the Border Cyclists Battalion that stayed in Belgium and soon, would try to head for France. The rest of the Cyclists were either disbanded, or sent to reinforce other sections of the front.

By May 15, the forces aboard the train passed through France at Orlèans. In comparison, the Ardennes Hunters went farther, all the way to the Pyrenees Mountains. The Mixed Company, which was now in France, was heading for Amiens.

On May 18, things have gone terrible for the Mixed Company. They headed straight for the Germans, and several troops were wounded and killed. The remainder makes it to Somme for a River crossing, and now knows the Germans have encircled the Allied Forces, including them after the capture of Abbeville. The forces aboard the train have reached Gard.

By May 22, some of the Mixed Company were captured and the rest were sent skirmishing 8 Kilometers from the Somme. The Border Cyclists Battalion that was on the train arrived at their containment quarters at Saint Paulet. News arrive of the Belgian retreat and the desperate situation of the front.

By May 24, the Mixed Company began their escape. It went badly and more men were killed. The remainder were still, at the right bank of the Somme. Seeing no hope of escape, the Mixed Company handed itself over. In the end, the entire Border Cyclists Battalion was reduced to a few Antitank/aircraft weapons, and only about 200 fighting troops. They were handed over to the 7th Ardennes Jagers Regiment on June 6, but the Jager Regiment would also capitulate following the fall of France.

The Border Cyclists Battalion was one of the few Belgian detachments that kept on combating the Germans, even after their country capitulated.

== Structure 1940 ==
Structure of the Battalion at the eve of the Battle of Belgium

- Headquarters, at Charleroi
- Commanding Officer, Paul Dumont
- 1st Company Fortification (Transferred from 1st Cyclist Regiment)
- 2nd Mixed Company (Mixed Company)

== See also ==
- Border Cyclists Battalion Limburg (Limburg Battalion)
