= Pierre Emmanuel Félix Chazal =

Belgian Politician (1808-1892)

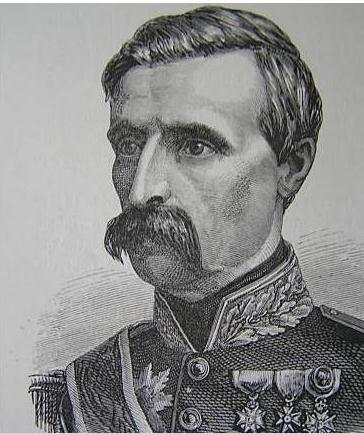

Minister of War
- In office 12 August 1847 – 29 July 1850
- Prime Minister: Charles Rogier
- Preceded by: Albert Prisse
- Succeeded by: Mathieu Brialmont
- In office 6 April 1859 – 12 November 1866
- Prime Minister: Charles Rogier
- Preceded by: Edouard Berten
- Succeeded by: Auguste Goethals

Personal details
- Born: 1 January 1808 Tarbes, France
- Died: 25 January 1892 (Aged 84) Pau, France
- Party: Liberal Party
- Spouse: Anne-Thérèse Graff
- Children: 4
- Education: Athénée de Bruxelles

Pierre Emmanuel Félix Chazal (1 January 1808 - 25 January 1892) was a Belgian military officer, statesman and politician from the Liberal Party who twice served as Minister of War.

== Early life ==
Chazal was born on 1 January 1808 in Tarbes, France as a son of Marie-Françoise Palatine De Laville (1788-1883) and Jean-Pierre Chazal (1766-1840), who served on the National Convention and amongst others voted in favour of the execution of King Louis XVI. Jean-Pierre Chazal fell in favour with French Emperor Napoleon and following his defeat and subsequent exile in 1815, the family's possessions were confiscated and they first moved to Vilvoorde before settling in Brussels in 1816. Chazal attended the Athénée de Bruxelles before marrying Anne-Thérèse Graff (1813-1892) in Liège on 30 May 1829. The couple had four sons who all later enrolled in the military and became officers.

== Career ==
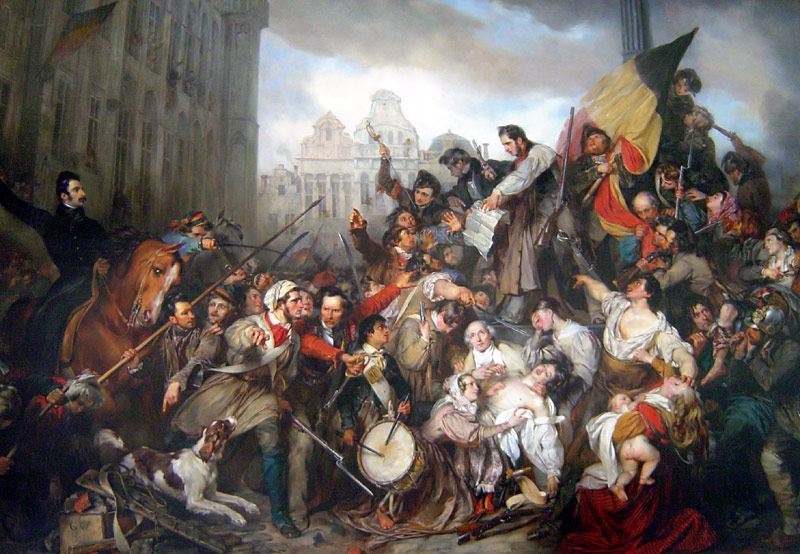
Chazal, seen on horseback on the left, during the Belgian Revolution in 1830. Painted by Gustaaf Wappers in 1835.

Chazal took on an active role as second commander of an army division in Liège during the Belgian Revolution in September 1830, organizing a civilian guard and crushing Dutch resistance in Belgium. For his actions, the Provisional Government appointed him Division-General on 13 November 1830. He was further promoted to Major General on 21 July 1842 and became a Naturalized Belgian citizen on 9 June 1844 as a reward for his service during the Revolution. Chazal became Adjutant General for King Leopold I on 5 May 1846 and was promoted by the king to Lieutenant General on 11 August 1847. The next day, Chazal was named Minister of War as a member of the Liberal Party by Prime Minister Charles Rogier. He remained in that position until he was assigned the command of the 9th infantry division and the 2nd territorial division on 29 July 1850. King Leopold I entrusted Chazal to represent him during the coronation of Tsar Alexander II in 1856 before awarding Chazal with the hereditary title of Baron on 12 August 1857. On 6 April 1859, Chazal was again appointed by Prime Minister Charles Rogier as Minister of War. During his tenure, a debate about the Second French intervention in Mexico with Representative Jan De Laet from Antwerp escalated into a duel on 8 April 1865. Chazal lost the duel and was wounded in the skirmish. However, as duelling was illegal in Belgium since 1841, Chazal was persecuted and sentenced by the Court of cassation to a fine and prison sentence for misdemeanors while serving in the function of Minister. Chazal handed his resignation to King Leopold II, who refused to accept it and instead used his leverage to influence the Senate to grant Chazal a full pardon. Chazal afterwards decided to heal from his wounds in France when he heard of the death of his son, who served as a Captain in the Belgian military expedition in Mexico. Chazal's wounds didn't heal properly, prompting the Prime Minister to excuse him from his Minister duties on 12 November 1866 and was named Minister of State for his service.

== Later life and death ==
Chazal commanded an observation force at the southern and eastern border of Belgium during the Franco-Prussian War in 1870. Following the defeat of French Emperor Napoleon III at Sedan, Chazal was tasked to meet the Emperor at the Franco-Belgian border and accompany him to the German border where he would be taken prisoner. Chazal retired from active service as Lieutenant general of the Infantry on 24 May 1875 for health reasons and began writing his memoirs at his castle in Pau, France. Chazal died in his castle on 25 January 1892, aged 84, his wife died later that same day.

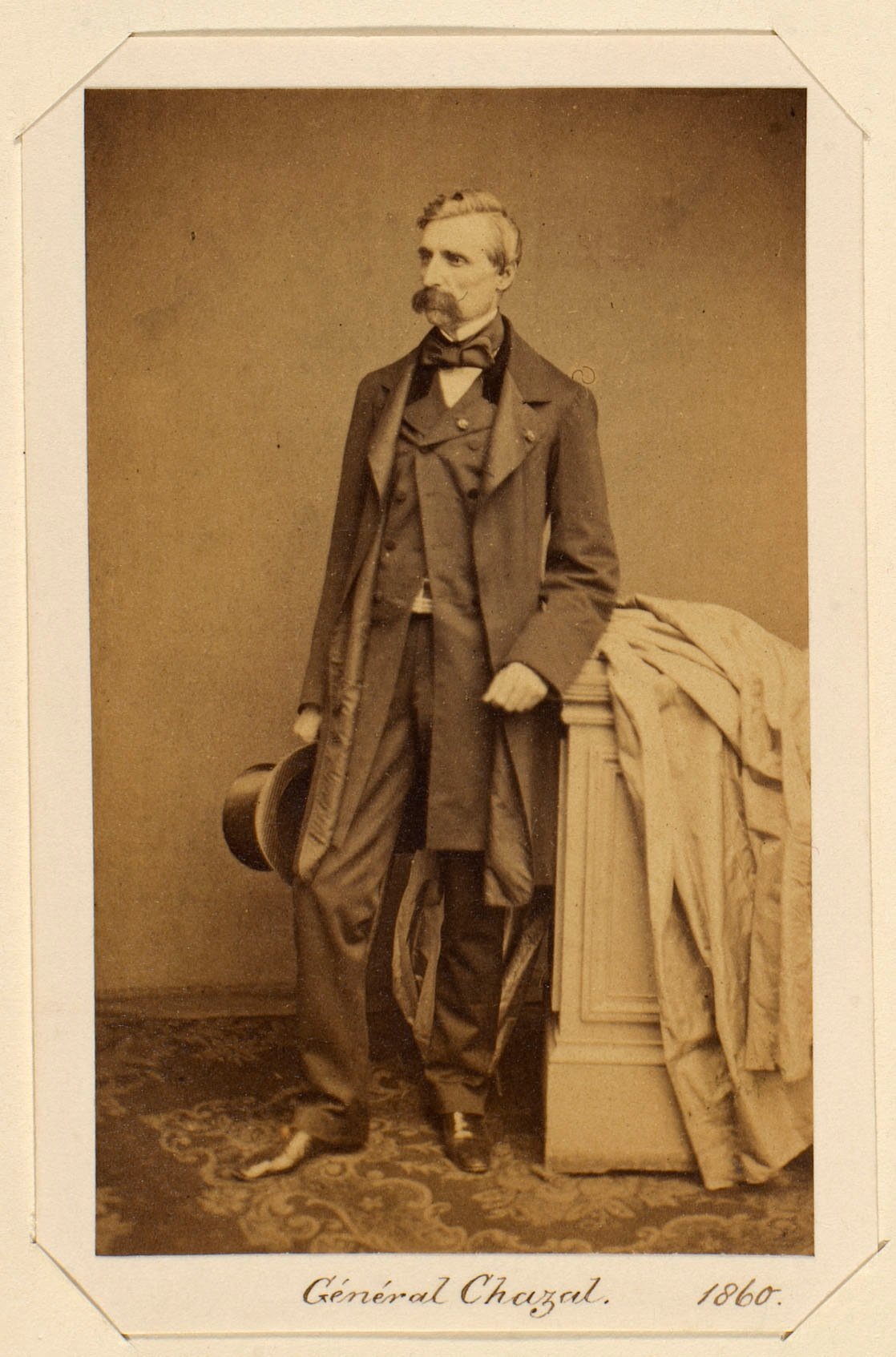
Chazal in 1860.

== Military awards and commands ==
=== Awards ===
- Belgium: Grand Cross in the Order of Leopold
- Belgium: Iron Cross (1830)
- Belgium: Military Cross
- Belgium: Memorial Cross (1856)
- Russian Empire: Order of Saint Anna (1st Class)
- Russian Empire: Grand Cross in the Order of the White Eagle
- Russian Empire: Grand Cross in the Order of Alexander Nevsky
- Austrian Empire: Order of Leopold
- Kingdom of Sardinia: Order of Saints Maurice and Lazarus
- Kingdom of Portugal: Military Order of the Tower and Sword
- Kingdom of Greece: Order of the Redeemer
- Mexico: Order of our lady of Guadeloupe
- France: Legion of Honour
- Empire of Brazil: Order of the Rose
- Hanover: Royal Guelphic Order
- Ottoman Empire: Order of Distinction
- Prussia: Order of the Crown
- Prussia: Princely House Order of Hohenzollern (Cross of Honour 1st Class)

=== Commands ===
- 1830-1833: Commander of the Belgian Army
- 1833-1837: Commander of the Liège Province
- 1837-1839: Commander of the 9th Line Regiment
- 1846-1865: Adjutant General for King Leopold I
- 1850-1875: Military Governor of the Royal Residences
- 1851-1859: Commander of the 2nd territorial and 2nd Infantry division
- 1865-1892: Adjutant General for King Leopold II
- 1866-1870: Commander of the 4th territorial division
- 1870: Commander of the observation force
- 1870-1874: Commander of the 2nd territorial division
- 1874-1875: Commander of the 2nd Military description
- 1875-1892: Chief of the military house of Leopold II

== Legacy ==
A statue of Chazal was revealed during a ceremony on 30 August 1908 in Leopoldsburg. The ceremony was attended by 2,000 veterans of the Observation force, who Chazal had commanded in 1870. Chazal is also present as a young officer on horseback on the most famous painting of the Belgian revolution, which was painted by Gustaaf Wappers in 1835.
