= Albert Prisse =

Belgian soldier, engineer, diplomat and statesman

Baron Albert-Florent-Joseph Prisse
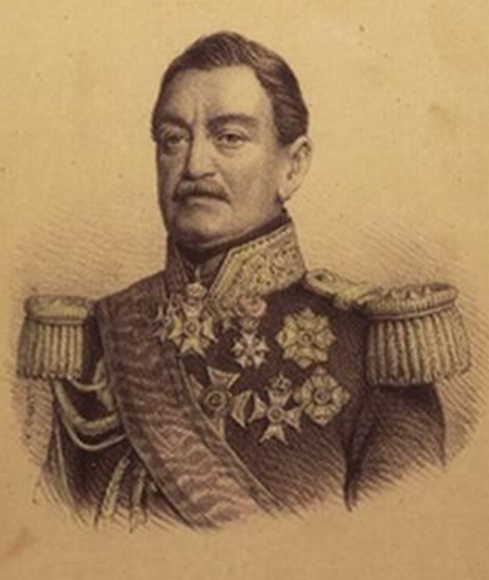

Minister of War
- In office 1 March 1846 – 1847
- Preceded by: Jules d'Anethan
- Succeeded by: Pierre Emmanuel Félix Chazal

Personal details
- Born: 24 June 1788 Maubeuge, Nord, France
- Died: 22 November 1856 (aged 68) Rome, Papal States
- Occupation: Soldier, engineer, diplomat

Albert-Florent-Joseph Prisse (24 June 1788 – 22 November 1856) was a Belgian soldier, engineer, diplomat and statesman of French origin. His family lost their fortune during the French Revolution. He served in the army of Napoleon between 1809 and 1814 in Austria, Spain and the Netherlands. In 1816 he became a naturalized citizen of the Kingdom of the Netherlands, and served in the army as a surveyor. When Belgium broke away from the Netherlands in 1830 he became an officer of the new Belgian army. He served in various military commands, represented Belgium at the Court of the Hague for three years, and was Belgian Minister of War in 1846–47.

== Early years: 1788–1809 ==
Albert-Florent-Joseph Prisse was born in Maubeuge, Nord, France on 24 July 1788. His family originated in England and seems to have settled in French Hainaut late in the 17th century. His father became a lawyer in Flanders and an advisor to the king. During the French Revolution Albert Prisse was sent to stay with his uncle, Louis-Albert-César Prisse, a captain with the forces of the Dutch Republic. His parents were thrown in prison, where his mother died, and the family fortune was lost. After the fall of Robespierre his father regained his freedom and was given various official appointments in Maastricht. Albert Prisse studied at the Prytanée National Militaire in Paris, then the Lycée de Bruxelles. On 1 December 1807 Prisse enrolled in the École spéciale militaire in Fontainebleau. He graduated on 25 March 1809 as a second lieutenant.

== Napoleonic army: 1809–15 ==
On 11 April 1809 Prisse was assigned to the 1st Foot Chasseur Regiment of the Imperial Guard, which became the 3rd Voltigeurs Regiment in 1811. In 1809 he campaigned in Austria and took part in the Battle of Wagram. In 1810 his regiment was sent to Spain, where he was promoted to lieutenant. He broke his leg in a fall from his horse on 30 December 1811, and returned to Paris in mid-March 1812 after a painful journey. The fractured leg had resulted in a limp that disabled him for military service, and he was given a pension and permission to return to Maastricht. He obtained work with the administration to supplement his pension. On 4 October 1813 he married Henriette-Françoise-Louise Rigano, from a Dutch Protestant family.

After the series of military disasters in 1812–13 Napoleon ordered the return of all retired officers of the Guard. Prisse served during the siege of Maastricht as a captain of engineers under General Merle. Prisse and his father were left without jobs after the fortress of Maastricht capitulated. With some difficulty Prisse found work with the French tax authorities.

== Netherlands citizen: 1816–30 ==
In February 1816 Prisse obtained leave to return to Maastricht. On 14 April 1816 he was made a naturalized citizen of the new Kingdom of the Netherlands, and in 1817 became a captain in the Netherlands army on the staff of the quartermaster-general, responsible for topographical mapping in the southern provinces of Namur and Luxembourg. In 1826 Prisse was assigned to help make a geological map, for which purpose he studied the subject and became known by the agents of the Compagnie de Luxembourg. This company was sponsored by the Société Générale de Belgique with the purpose of creating a navigable canal between the Meuse and the Moselle and exploring and exploiting metal mines in Namur and Luxembourg. Prisse retired from the army on 25 November 1827 so he could take charge of the Compagnie de Luxembourg mines. In 1829 he traveled to Spain to investigate the reasons why that country was able to flood Europe with extremely cheap lead ores.

== Belgian service: 1830–56 ==
When the Belgian Revolution of 1830 began in Namur the Dutch troops held the citadel while the city was held by the Belgian patriots. Prisse was given command of the civil guard in the city, and was a signatory to the agreement by which the citadel surrendered. He offered his service to the provisional government in Brussels, and on 22 October 1830 was appointed lieutenant colonel in the new Belgian army. On 14 February 1831 he was appointed a colonel on the staff of King Leopold I of Belgium. He accompanied the king in the Ten Days' Campaign of August 1831 in which the Dutch army entered Belgium and defeated the Belgian army in several encounters, but eventually withdrew in face of a French force.

After the August events Prisse was appointed adjutant to the king, and soon after also became Deputy Chief of the General Staff, in which role he was active in the reorganization of the army. He also had to deal with disturbances in the western part of Luxembourg that began in December 1832, where he was sent to restore order with four infantry battalions. He arrested 30 individuals and imprisoned them to wait trial in Namur, then returned to Brussels. However, there were renewed disturbances in April 1832. Prisse helped negotiate a treaty with Luxembourg later that year. He received some criticism for ceding too much. He assisted in foundation of the Military School.

On 6 January 1834 Prisse was sent to Province of Antwerp as acting commander of the division guarding Antwerp and the banks of the Scheldt. He was appointed general on 12 April 1834 and given full command of the troops of Antwerp and the Scheldt, which he held until 1837. He then returned to the position of deputy chief of the General Staff until 22 June 1839, when he was made president of the commission to demarcate the borders between Belgium and the Netherlands, and between Belgium and Luxembourg. This work was almost complete when he was made Envoy Extraordinary and Minister Plenipotentiary to the Court of The Hague on 12 July 1842, a post he held for three years. He completed various successful negotiations during this period. On 15 May 1844 he was granted the hereditary title of Baron.

On 12 July 1845 Prisse was promoted to lieutenant general. Prisse was again aide to the king until 1 March 1846, when he was made Minister of War in the cabinet headed by Count Barthélémy de Theux de Meylandt, holding office for 18 months. After leaving the ministry Prisse was made military governor of the royal residence and commander of the 2nd Territorial Division from 1847 to 1850. He was Adjutant General and head of the military house of the King of Belgium from 1850 to 1852, and then head of the military house of the Duke of Brabant. He retired in 1854, and was appointed Minister of State by the king. He died during a winter vacation on 22 November 1856 in Rome, aged 68.

== Honours ==
Honors given to Prisse included:

- Belgium: Minister of State, by Royal Decree.
- Belgium: Grand Officer in the Order of Leopold.
- France: Grand Officer in the Legion of Honour.
- Knight Grand Cross in the Saxe-Ernestine House Order.
- Knight Grand Cross in the Order of the Oak Crown.
- Commander in the Order of the Netherlands Lion.
- Knight 2nd class in the Order of the Red Eagle.

== Sources ==
- "Albert-Florent-Joseph Baron Prisse", ars-moriendi.be (in French)
- Goblet d’Alviella, Eugène (1904). "PRISSE, Baron Albert, F.-J". Biographie Nationale (in French). Archived from the original on 2007-10-31.
