= 1st Infantry Division (Belgium) =

- 1e Infanteriedivisie
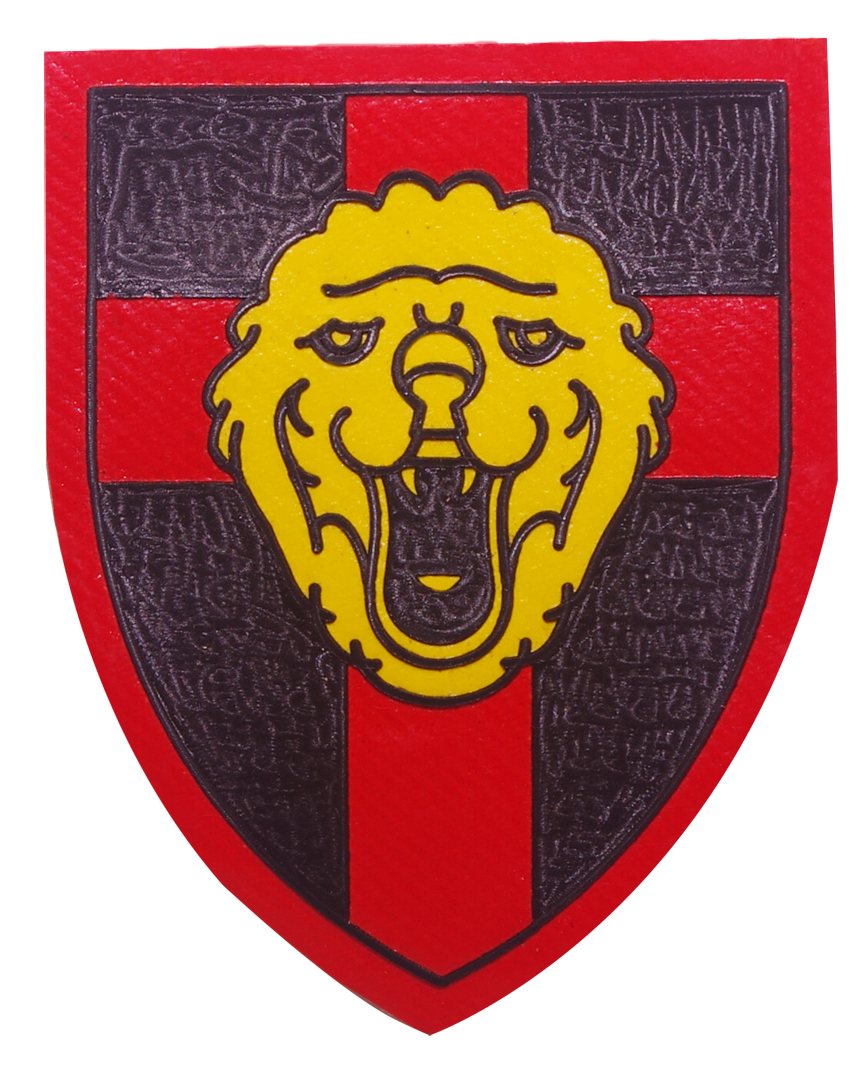
- Active: 1913–1919; 1939–1940; 1945–1994
- Country: Belgium
- Branch: Belgian Land Component
- Type: Infantry Division
- Role: Infantry
- Size: Division
- Part of: Cavalry Corps
- Garrison/HQ: Hasselt
- Engagements: First World War; Second World War; Battle of Belgium

Commanders
- Notable commanders: Lieutenant General Louis Bernheim; Lieutenant General Walter Coppens

The 1st Infantry Division (Dutch: 1e Infanteriedivisie) was an infantry division of the Belgian Army. It fought in World War I (1914–1918) and in the Battle of Belgium (1940) during World War II.

== History ==
=== First World War ===
At the start of World War I, the 1st Infantry Division was classified as '1st Division', commanded by Lieutenant-General Baix. The headquarters were located at Ghent and the division was composed of the 2nd, 3rd, and 4th Mixed Brigades with limited Cavalry support from the 3rd Lancers Regiment. Artillery units came from the 1st Artillery Regiment..
In January 1915, Lieutenant-General Baix was replaced by Louis Bernheim, who commanded the Division until 4 October 1919.

=== Second World War ===
The 1st Infantry Division was active before mobilization was announced, therefore, the units of the division already had a reconnaissance unit, a transportation unit, and a medical unit, making it one of the most strongest divisions in the entire Belgian Army. The 1st Infantry Division is placed near the Hasselt sector of the Albert Canal.

The 1st Infantry Division heavily fortified its position when the German attack was confirmed. Yet, the Germans breach the line, and fierce fighting erupts. The 1st Infantry Division had to retreat from the Albert Canal. The 1st Infantry Division was recalled to the K-W line and part of its division(3rd Line Regiment) was sent to the Demer position.

When recalled for action again, the 1st Infantry Division was now responsible for a large section of the K-W line, extending the defenses from Beigem to Nieuwenrode. On May 15, redeployment helped bolster the lines.

On May 16, an unexpected retreat and abandonment of the K-W line by the Allied forces (French 1st Army, and the British Expeditionary Force) forced the Belgians to withdraw, and the 1st Infantry Division was assigned the task of slowing the German advance in the Northern sector while a new defense was being constructed in the south.

The 1st Infantry Division succeeds in their operations and thousands of troops make it to the newly coordinated Terneuzen-Oudenaarde line. But soon, a counterattack by the Germans in the North resulted in threatening the flanks of forces defending the Scheldt Canal, and so, the 1st Infantry Division construct new positions near the town of Sint-Amands. The line was untenable and the Division was pushed to Ghent.

After the encirclement of the Allied forces in Northern France and Flanders, things escalated from bad to worse. The German pressure steadily increased and eventually, Ghent was evacuated.

The 1st Infantry Division had taken up positions on the new defense in the Korkrijk-Menen sector, and Korkrijk specifically, was heavily reinforced. There was a concern about Menen though. No British forces were ever seen in the city, with only some French Sappers manning the bridges.

In Korkrijk, things developed really badly for the 1st Infantry Division. The German attack heavily deterred the regiments deployed there and after some time, a breach was already made.

The division had to retreat to a new defense by May 26. Only three antitank weapons survived the German attack. Out of all the Infantry Divisions now under the single command of I Corps, the 1st Infantry Division took the most damage, having one mixed battalion left, formed out of only 4 companies.

This battalion was transferred to 6th Infantry Division, meaning that the 1st Infantry Division is stripped of strength. The remainder of this division was dissolved following Belgian surrender.

=== Cold War ===
The 1st Infantry Division was recreated in 1945 and served as part of the occupation army in Allied-occupied Germany until 1952. Then it became part of Nato's Northern Army Group as part of the Belgian I Corps. After the dissolution of the Soviet Union, conscription in Belgium was abolished in 1992, and the 1st Infantry Division was dissolved in 1994.

== Structure ==
=== 1914 ===
After mobilization, 1st division's structure in 1914 was as follows:

- Headquarters, 1st Infantry Division, in Ghent
  - 1st Administration Company
  - Administration Detachment
  - Field Telegraph, in Antwerp
  - x 2 Gendarmerie Reconnaissance Squadrons, in Bruges and Ghent
  - 1st Battalion, Carabinier Regiment, in Brussels
  - 1st Field Artillery Regiment, in Ghent and Antwerp
  - 1st Company, 1st Engineer Battalion, in Antwerp
  - x 1 Engineer Park Section, in Antwerp
  - 1st Train Company, in Antwerp
  - x 2 Infantry Ammunition Columns, in Termonde
  - x 2 Artillery Ammunition Column, in Termonde
  - Supply Column, in Termonde
  - Provisional Equipage Section, in Termonde
  - Ambulance Column, in Termonde
  - x 2 Field Hospitals
  - Remount Depot, in Termonde
  - Headquarters, 1st Brigade, in Ghent
    - 1st Regiment of the Line
    - 2nd Regiment of the Line, in Ghent and Termonde
  - Headquarters, 2nd Brigade, in Bruges
    - 3rd Regiment of the Line, in Ostend and Ypres
    - 4th Regiment of the Line

=== 1940 ===
Structure of the division at the eve of the Battle of Belgium.

- Headquarters, at Hasselt
- Commanding General, 1st Infantry Division - Lieutenant-General Walter Coppens
- 3rd Line Regiment
- 4th Line Regiment
- 24th Line Regiment
- 1st Artillery Regiment
- 1st Battalion Engineer
- 1st Battalion of Transmission Troops
- Cyclists Squadron 1ID(to the 1st Infantry Division)
- 2nd Auxiliary Battalion

== See also ==
- Battle of Belgium
- Army Group B
- 14th Infantry Division
- K-W Line
- Belgian Forces in Germany

== Bibliography ==
- "Belgian Army, 1914" (PDF). Combined Arms Research Library. United States Army Command and General Staff College. 2005. Archived from the original (PDF) on 8 March 2016.
- https://18daagseveldtocht.be/
