= Ministry of Defence (Belgium) =

Belgian government ministry

The Ministry of Defence (Dutch: Ministerie van Landsverdediging, French: Ministère de la Défense, German: Ministerium der Verteidigung), formerly called the Ministry of War and Ministry of National Defence, is the Belgian ministry responsible for national defence and the Belgian military. Belgium's ministry of defence is responsible to the Minister of Defence.

As a result of the Verhofstadt I Government's plans to modernise the federal administration, all other ministries were transformed into Federal Public Services (FPS), but in August 2007 there still was no Royal Order creating the FPS Defence, although that name is already in use on official websites.

The Chief of Defence (CHOD) is the highest uniformed official in the Ministry of Defence. The CHOD is assisted in the exercise of his functions by a Vice-Chief of Defence (VCHOD) and a Secretary-General.

The Ministry of Defence is organised into multiple staff departments and directorates-general. The Armed Forces are subordinate to the Assistant Chief of Staff (ACOS) Operations and Training, who heads the Staff Department for Operations and Training. He is assisted by two Deputy Assistant Chiefs of Staff (DACOS), one for Operations and Planning and one for Training and Support.

Another staff department is the Staff Department for Intelligence and Security, which is led by the ACOS Intelligence and Security. This staff department is also known as the General Intelligence and Security Service and is responsible for military intelligence and security.

== Ministers of Defence ==
Year	Photo	Minister	Party
1831		Albert Goblet d'Alviella	Liberal
1831		Charles d'Hane de Steenhuyze	Liberal
1831		Amédée de Failly	Liberal
1831–1832		Charles de Brouckère	Liberal
1832		Félix de Merode	Liberal
1832–1836		Louis Evain	?
1836–1840		Jean-Pierre Willmar	Liberal
1840–1842		Gérard Buzen	Liberal
1842–1843		Henri de Liem	Liberal
1843		Léandre Desmaisières	Liberal
1843–1846		Pierre Dupont	Liberal
1846		Jules Joseph d'Anethan	Catholic
1846–1847		Albert Prisse	Catholic
1847–1850		Félix Chazal	Liberal
1850–1851		Mathieu Brialmont	Liberal
1851–1855		Victor Anoul	Liberal
1855–1857		Léonard Greindl	?
1857–1859		Edouard Berten	Liberal
1859–1866		Félix Chazal	Liberal
1866–1868		Auguste Goethals	Liberal
1868–1870		Bruno Renard	None (technical expert)
1870–1873		Gustave Henri Louis Guillaume	None (technical expert)
1873–1878		Séraphin Thiebault	None (technical expert)
1878–1879		Bruno Renard	None (technical expert)
1879–1880		Jean-Baptiste Liagre	None (technical expert)
1880–1884		Guillaume Gratry	None (technical expert)
1884–1893		Charles Pontus	None (technical expert)
1893–1896		Jacques Brassine	None (technical expert)
1896–1899		Jules Vandenpeereboom	Catholic
1899–1907		Alexandre Cousebandt d'Alkemade	None (technical expert)
1907–1912		Joseph Hellebaut	None (technical expert)
1912		Charles de Broqueville	Catholic
1912		Victor Michel	None (technical expert)
1912–1917		Charles de Broqueville	Catholic
1917–1918		Armand De Ceuninck	None (technical expert)
1918–1920		Fulgence Masson	Liberal
1920		Paul-Emile Janson	Liberal
1920–1923		Albert Devèze	Liberal
1923–1925		Pierre Forthomme	Liberal
1925		Albert Hellebaut	None (technical expert)
1925–1926		Prosper Kestens	None (technical expert)
1926		Prosper Poullet	Catholic
1926–1931		Charles de Broqueville	Catholic
1931–1932		Léon Dens	Liberal
1932		Paul Crokaert	Catholic
1932		Georges Theunis	Catholic
1932–1936		Albert Devèze	Liberal
1936–1940		Henri Denis	None (technical expert)
1940–1944		Hubert Pierlot	Catholic
*1942		Henri Rolin	POB-BWP
1944–1945		Fernand Demets	Liberal
1945–1946		Léon Mundeleer	Liberal
1946–1949		Raoul de Fraiteur	None (technical expert)
1949–1950		Albert Devèze	Liberal
1950		Henri Moreau de Melen	Christian Social Party
1950–1954		Eugène De Greef	None (technical expert)
1954–1958		Antoon Spinoy	PSB-BSP
1958–1961		Arthur Gilson	Christian Social Party
1961–1965		Paul-Willem Segers	CVP
1965–1966		Ludovic Moyersoen	CVP
1966–1968		Charles Poswick	PLP
1968–1972		Paul-Willem Segers	CVP
1972–1979		Paul Vanden Boeynants	PSC
1979–1980		José Desmarets	PSC
1980		Charles Poswick	PRL
1980–1981		Frank Swaelen	CVP
1981–1985		Alfred Vreven	PVV
1985–1988		François-Xavier de Donnéa	PRL
1988–1992		Guy Coëme	PS
1992–1994		Leo Delcroix	CVP
1994–1995		Karel Pinxten	CVP
1995		Melchior Wathelet	PSC
1995–1999		Jean-Pol Poncelet	PSC

=== 2000s ===
No.	Portrait	Name (Born-Died)	Term			Political Party	Government
No.	Portrait	Name (Born-Died)	Took office	Left office	Duration	Political Party	Government
1	André Flahaut	André Flahaut (born 1955)	12 July 1999	21 December 2007	8 years, 162 days	PS	Verhofstadt I–II
2	Pieter De Crem	Pieter De Crem (born 1962)	21 December 2007	11 October 2014	6 years, 294 days	CD&V	Verhofstadt III; Leterme I Van Rompuy; Leterme II; Di Rupo
3	Steven Vandeput	Steven Vandeput (born 1967)	11 October 2014	12 November 2018	4 years, 32 days	N-VA	Michel I
4	Sander Loones	Sander Loones (born 1979)	12 November 2018	9 December 2018	27 days	N-VA	Michel I
5	Didier Reynders	Didier Reynders (born 1958)	9 December 2018	30 November 2019	356 days	MR	Michel II; Wilmès I
6	Philippe Goffin	Philippe Goffin (born 1967)	30 November 2019	1 October 2020	306 days	MR	Wilmès I Wilmès II
7	Ludivine Dedonder	Ludivine Dedonder (born 1977)	1 October 2020	3 February 2025	4 years, 125 days	PS	De Croo
8	Theo Francken	Theo Francken (born 1978)	3 February 2025	Incumbent	1 year, 250 days*	N-VA	De Wever

* Incumbent's term duration last updated: 11 October 2026.

== See also ==
- Military of Belgium
- Defence Diplomacy
