= Louis Bernheim =

Belgian career soldier and general

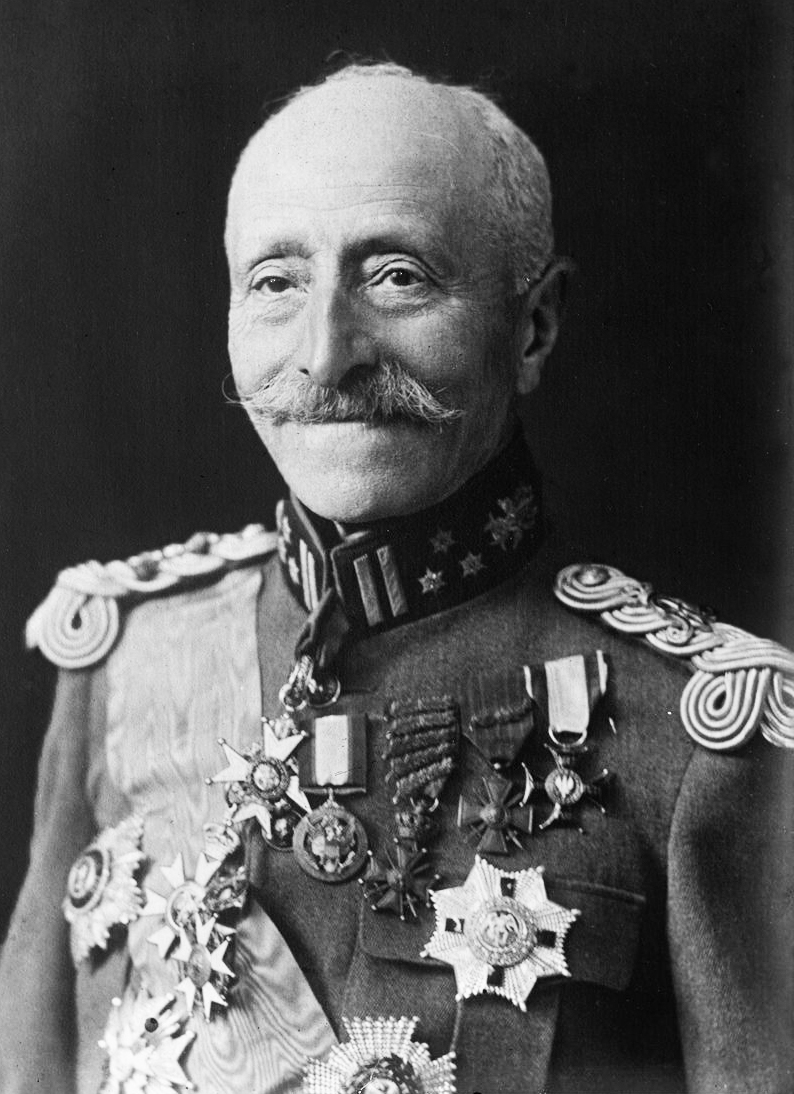
- Portrait photograph of Bernheim.
- Born: 1 September 1861; Saint-Josse-ten-Noode, Belgium
- Died: 13 February 1931 (aged 69); Paris, France
- Military career
- Allegiance: Belgium
- Rank: 1880–1923
- Commands: 1st Infantry Division (Belgium)
- Conflicts: World War I; Siege of Antwerp; Battle of the Yser; Yser Front; Hundred Days Offensive

Lieutenant-General Louis Bernheim (1 September 1861 – 13 February 1931) was a Belgian career soldier and general, best known for his service during World War I. He is also notable as one of Belgium's highest ranking soldiers of Jewish origin.

== Biography ==
Louis Bernheim was born into a Jewish family in Saint-Josse-ten-Noode, Brussels in Belgium on 1 September 1861. His parents had emigrated to Belgium from Nancy, France in 1858. Entering the École Militaire in 1878, he joined the Regiment of Grenadiers as a second lieutenant at the age of 19. He later taught at the Royal Military Academy in Brussels and rose through the ranks rapidly. By the time of the German invasion of Belgium in August 1914, Bernheim was serving as a lieutenant-colonel in the 7th Regiment of the Line.

Bernheim was promoted to command the 3rd Brigade during the Siege of Antwerp in September 1914 and commanded his unit during the fighting around the Nete. He was promoted to major-general in November and, in 1915, was given command of the 1st Army Division in the Steenstrate section of the Yser Front. During an inspection of his troops at the front in September 1915, he was severely wounded by an enemy artillery shell but returned to service after just two months' convalescence. In March 1916, he was promoted to the rank of lieutenant-general. His command of the 1st Army Division coincided with the emergence of the Frontbeweging in 1917, a new faction within the broader Flemish movement, which began to agitate against perceived linguistic and cultural discrimination in the Belgian Army. Bernheim was criticized personally by Flamingant soldiers for his attempts to suppress it.

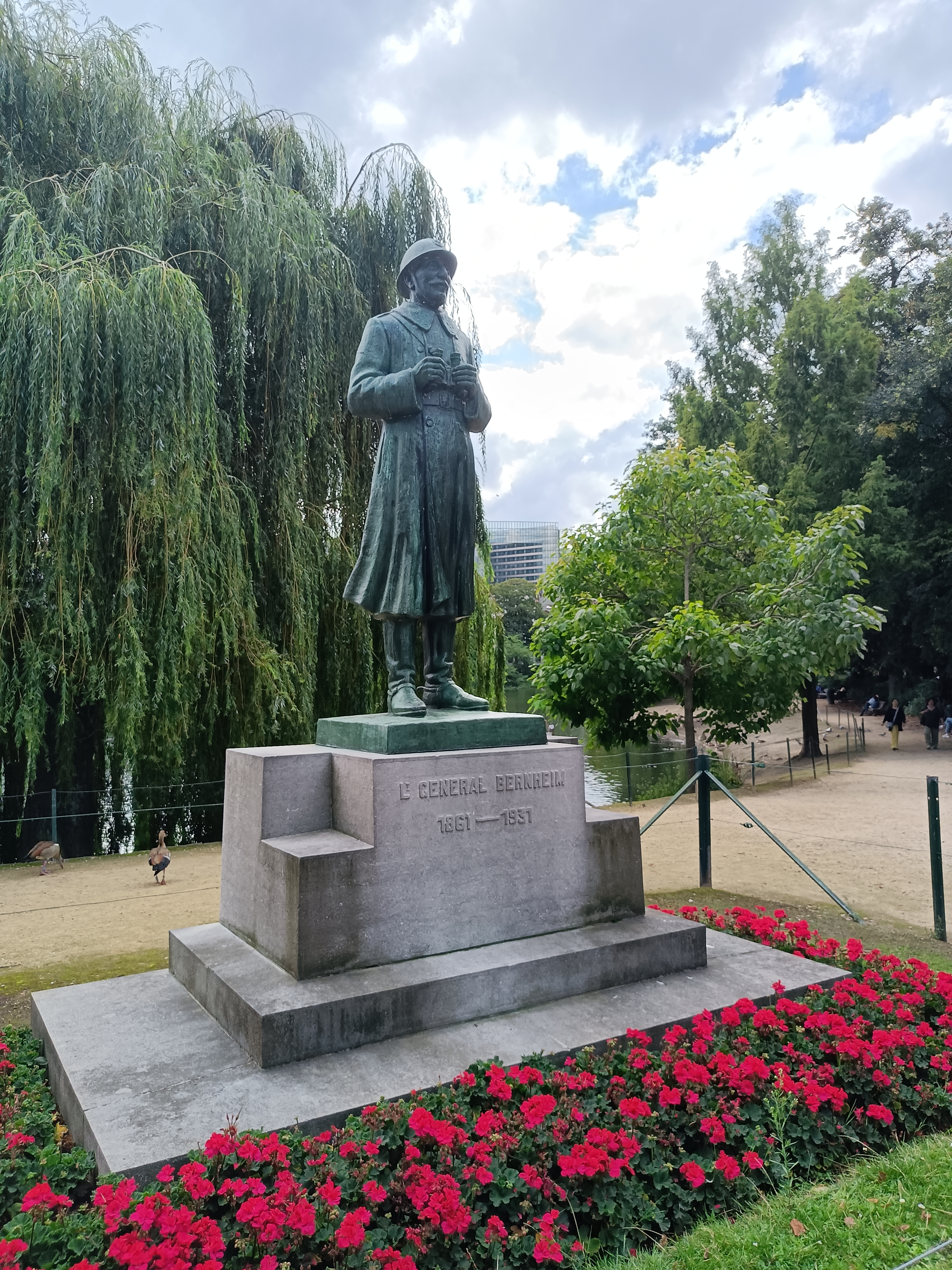
Edmond de Valériola's statue of Bernheim in Square Marie-Louise, Brussels which was unveiled in 1936

In September 1918, he was placed in command of a group of three army divisions on the Yser during the Belgian advance in the Hundred Days' Offensive. Berheim's units were notably involved in the capture of the important forest at Houthulst. After the end of the war, he was promoted to Inspector General of the Infantry and he officially retired from the army in 1926. Among the awards received by Bernheim during his career was the Légion d'honneur and the Order of the Bath.

Bernheim died in 1931 while visiting his daughter in Paris, France. As a freethinker, he had demanded to be cremated at his death and, because Belgian law did not permit it at the time, was cremated in France. His funeral was attended by King Albert I and the former prime minister, Charles de Broqueville. Bernheim is memorialised by an avenue in Etterbeek and by a public statue by Edmond de Valériola on the Square Marie-Louise, both in Brussels.

== Autography ==
- La question militaire (1928)

== See also ==
- John Monash – Australian Jewish General who served on the Western Front from 1916 to 1918.
