= Henri Denis =

Belgian Army general and politician

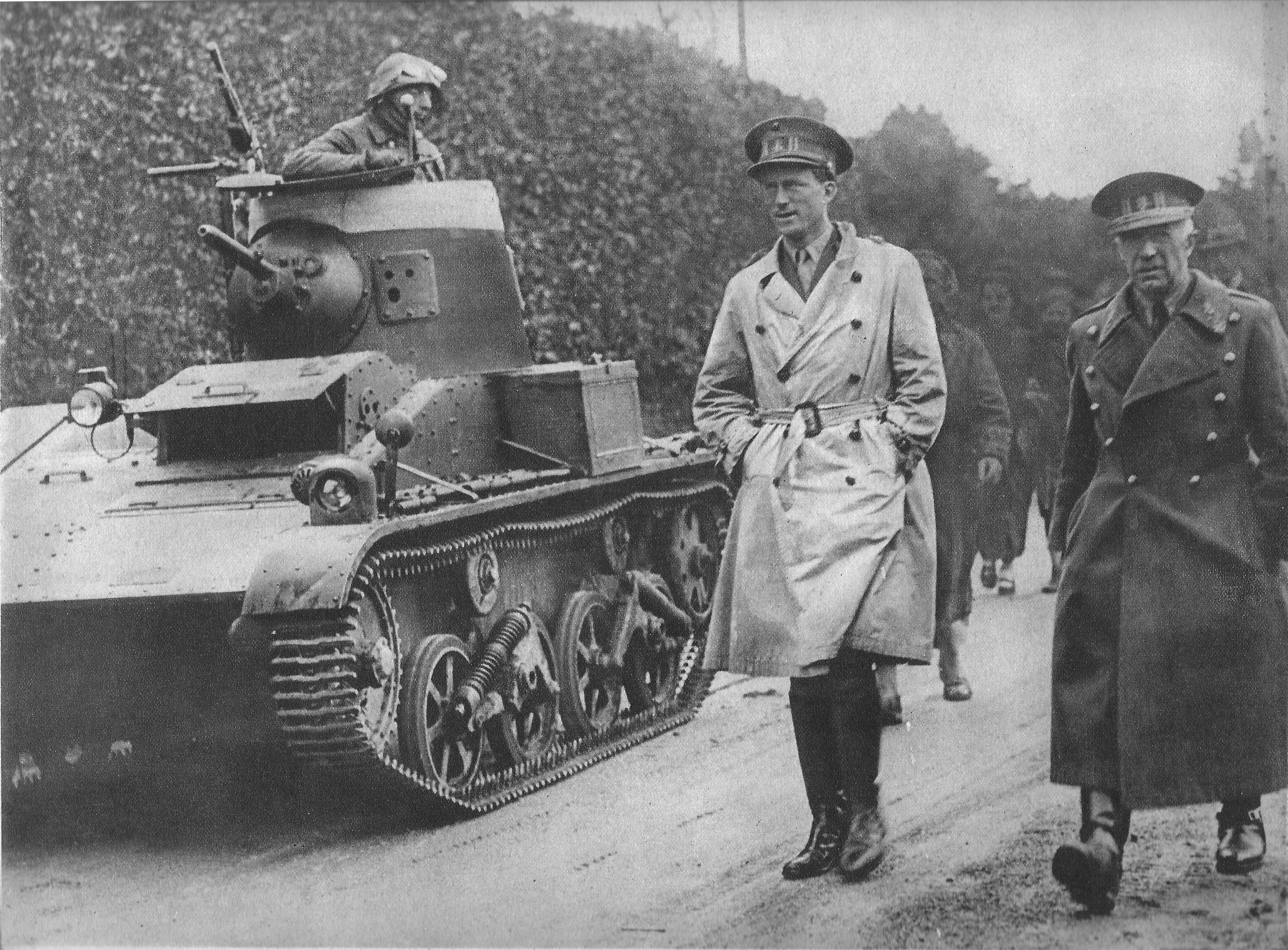
Leopold III and General Denis (right) inspect armoured vehicles. From L'Illustration, no. 5072, 18 May 1940.

Henri Jean Charles Eugène Denis (10 September 1877 – 19 January 1957) was a lieutenant general in the Belgian Army who served as Minister of National Defence at the beginning of the Second World War.

== Career ==
Denis was born in Marbais on 10 September 1877. He enrolled in the Royal Military Academy in 1895 and in 1905 became second lieutenant in an artillery regiment. He was promoted to lieutenant in 1906, adjutant to the General Staff in 1907, junior captain in 1912, full captain in May 1914. On 1 August 1914 he was assigned to the staff of the 18th Mixed Brigade. On 22 October 1914 he was removed from active duty after an accident and attached to the Ministry of War in the Belgian government in exile at Le Havre. In May 1915, at his own request, he returned to active duty on the Yser Front. In February 1917 he was appointed commissioner of the military railways, becoming a logistics specialist, and he was promoted to major on 26 September the same year. From 1920 he served on the logistics division of the General Staff. He became a lieutenant colonel in 1922, full colonel in 1927, major general in 1931 and lieutenant general in 1934.

Denis was appointed Minister of National Defence in the government that took office under Paul-Emile Janson on 23 November 1937, and retained the position in the administrations headed by Paul-Henri Spaak and Hubert Pierlot in the run-up to the Second World War. He was among the four members of the government who met with King Leopold III at Wijnendale Castle on 25 May 1940 and failed to convince the monarch to follow the government into exile in France. He himself, aged 63, resigned from the Belgian government in exile when it relocated to London in October 1940, opting to remain in retirement in Vichy France. In 1943 he moved to Switzerland. He died in Saint-Gilles (Brussels) on 19 January 1957, aged 79.

== Publications ==
- "Les Chemins de fer de campagne de l'armée belge pendant la guerre de 1914-1918", Bulletin belge des sciences militaires, 1:5 (1920), pp. 305-319; 2:2 (1921), pp. 105-116.
