= 2nd Infantry Division (Belgium) =

- 2e Infanteriedivisie
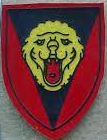
- Unit patch
- Active: 1913 - 1919; 25 August 1939 - 28 May 1940; 1950s
- Country: Belgium
- Branch: Belgian Land Component
- Type: Infantry division
- Role: Infantry
- Size: Division
- Part of: III Corps
- Garrison/HQ: Liège
- Engagements: First World War; Second World War; Battle of Belgium; Cold War

Commanders
- Notable commanders: Lieutenant-General Émile Dossin; Lieutenant General Auguste Colpin

The 2nd Infantry Division (Dutch: 2e Infanteriedivisie) was an infantry division of the Belgian Army which has been periodically reactivated and disbanded. It fought in the First World War (1914-18) and the Battle of Belgium in the Second World War. It was also briefly reactivated during the Cold War.

== History ==
=== First World War ===
At the start of World War I, the 2nd Infantry Division was known as ‘2nd Division,’ since they were one of only seven active divisions of the Belgian Army in 1914. Commanded by Lieutenant-General Émile Dossin, the 2nd Division had its headquarters in Antwerp, and were initially composed of the 5th, 6th, and 7th Mixed Brigades, all of which are formed from Regiments of-the-line. Cavalry support came from the 4th Chasseurs Regiment, and artillery from the 2nd Artillery Regiment..
In January 1915, Émile Dossin was replaced by Lieutenant-General Honoré Drubbel, who stayed in command until 04 October 1919.

=== Second World War ===
At the start of the war on May 10, 1940, the 2nd division was assigned the southernmost portion of the Fortified Position of Liège. Along with the 3rd and 7th divisions it occupied the linchpin of the Belgian 'covering position', whose aim was to hold the Albert Canal and Meuse lines giving the French and British armies time to deploy along the K-W Line. The 2nd took up well-prepared positions between the modernised fortresses of Boncelles, Embourg and Chaudfontaine, disposing of several bunkers positioned in two lines.

However, when war broke out it became soon clear that the 7th division to its far north suffered a major defeat and that the two divisions of the III corps were in imminent danger of encirclement. By the end of 10 May, its units were summoned to immediately withdraw to the K-W Line. During this manoeuvre, the trains that carried the heavy armament of the 2nd's infantry regiments were bombed by the Luftwaffe, causing a large loss of life and material.

Still, the division arrived on the 12th of May on time at its assigned position between Rijmenam and Haacht. First contact with the enemy was made on May 15 by the 6th regiment of the line.

On May 16, the order came for a general retreat away from the main line of resistance, due to the German breakthrough near Sedan. For the Belgian army, a retreat was ordered towards the Ghent Bridgehead, which was the last prepared line of defence. In two nightly marches, the 2nd division reached its assigned area between Moorslede and Kwatrecht. During the retreat, the 5th regiment of the line fought an intense rearguard action at the Willebroek canal near Rumbeek.

The section of the 2nd was to be the most exposed position of the Bridgehead south of the Scheldt. Upon arriving, the troops discovered in many places farmers removed the barbed wire obstacles during the harvest. Also, the troops discovered many of the bunkers were either closed or not fitted with the reglementary AT or machine guns. This is testimony of how ill-prepared the Allied command was for such a quick retreat from what it believed would be the main resistance line.

By May 20, the first contact was made with German units. An early German probe with armoured cars towards Ghent in the sector of the 5th regiment of the line was repulsed using T-13 tank destroyers and effective artillery fire, destroying German armour. A German attack on the 6th of the line succeeded in capturing some of the forward bunkers using flamethrowers but was checked when Belgian artillery fire neutralized their supporting guns.

Early May 21, the 6th of the line performed a successful counterattack re-capturing some of the lost bunkers. German attacks in the afternoon, supported by heavy guns and the Luftwaffe were repulsed due to effective co-ordination with the 4th artillery regiment and reinforcements from the 28th line regiment and divisional reserves.

Despite an earlier counterattack by reinforcements from the 4th division and a few tanks, the Germans had more success on the lines of the 5th regiment. Both its 1st and 3rd battalion were pushed back to their second lines, some companies only narrowly escaping encirclement.

By 22 May, the Germans reached the English Channel, cutting the British, Belgian and remaining French armies off. The Belgians were ordered to retreat a third time. The 2nd Division was sent to a sector at the Lys-Bruges canal, near Hansbeke. This time, the 28th of the Line took up the primary position to give the 5th and 6th some time to recuperate. As the Belgians dug in, some counterattacks and artillery duels were fought to keep the approaching Germans from organising an early attack.

As the Lys battle unfolded, the 2nd Division was spared the worst as the main German breakthrough took place to its south. By the end of 26 May the Belgian front along the Lys was crumbling, and the 2nd was ordered to retreat yet again towards an improvised defensive line covering Bruges. Except for some strafing by the Luftwaffe, its regiments did not see action due to the Belgian capitulation on the 28th.

At least 242 officers, NCOs and enlisted were killed in action.

== Structure ==
On the eve of the Battle of Belgium, the division's structure was as follows:

- 2nd Infantry Division
  - Divisional Headquarters
  - 5th Infantry Regiment
    - Regimental Headquarters
    - Staff Company
    - Medical Company
    - Scout Platoon
  - 6th Infantry Regiment
    - Regimental Headquarters
    - Staff Company
    - Medical Company
    - Scout Platoon
  - 28th Infantry Regiment
    - Regimental Headquarters
    - Staff Company
    - Medical Company
    - Scout Platoon
  - 2nd Artillery Regiment
    - Regimental Headquarters
    - Staff Battery
    - 1st Artillery Battalion
    - 2nd Artillery Battalion
    - 3rd Artillery Battalion
- Armoured Anti-Tank Company
- 12th Engineer Battalion

== See also ==
- Belgian Army order of battle (1940)
