= Albert Lantonnois van Rode =

Belgium Army general and politician

Albert Bruno Amédée Lantonnois van Rode
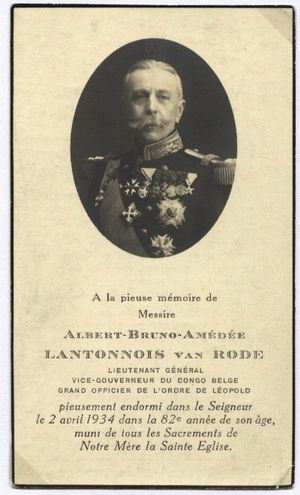
- Lantonnois' funeral card
- Born: 19 June 1852; Mons, Belgium
- Died: 2 April 1934 (aged 81); Ixelles, Belgium
- Military career
- Commands: 6th Infantry Division (Belgium)
- Known for: Vice-Governor General of Congo Free State

Albert Bruno Amédée Lantonnois van Rode (19 June 1852 – 2 April 1934) was a Belgian Lieutenant General descendant from an aristocratic family. He was Vice-Governor General of the Congo Free State and later commanded a division during World War I.

== Early years ==
Lantonnois van Rode was born in Mons on 19 June 1852, son of Lambert Lantonnois and Emilie Hubertine Ghislaine van Rode de Schellebrouck. He entered the Military Academy in April 1870, and was appointed second lieutenant on 8 April 1872. On 10 December 1877 he was appointed to the first regiment of guides. He was commander of the 8th Line Regiment (1903–1905) and of the 1st Regiment of Grenadiers (1905–1908). Lantonnois was commander of the West Flanders Province from 1908 to 1909.

== Congo ==
In November 1905 Lantonnois was stationed as Vice-Governor General of the Congo at Boma, the main port and capital of the colony. In July 1906 he sent a troop of 20 soldier to Kingoye on the border with the French Congo to establish Belgian authority. The Baptist Missionary Society (BMS) mission at Yakusu, just below the Stanley Falls, was at first on good terms with the authorities. However, as their influence grew there were rumours that the British planned to take over the region. In January 1907 the Lantonnois ordered the district commissioner of the Orientale Province to take vigorous measures to counter the influence of the Protestants.

In June 1908 Lantonnois received a request from Colonel Jan Oomen for permission to be allowed to build a mission at Basankusu. Lantonnois forwarded Oomen's request to the Colonial Ministry in Brussels, where there was a long delay before permission was obtained. In November 1909 Lantonnois had to deal with a crisis when a British force from Uganda moved into the Mfumbiro region to the north of Lake Kivu. He moved troops into the region and asked permission to attack, which was refused by the Belgian authorities, who correctly considered that arbitration would be a more profitable approach.

== Later career ==
Lantonnois was Inspector-General of the Infantry from 1913 to 1914. He was Commander of the 6th Army Division from 1914 until January 1915, and fought against the German invasion of Belgium. He was appointed Lieutenant-General of the Infantry and retired from the army in 1915.

== Marriage and children ==
Lantonnois van Rode married on 14 october 1873 Marie Thérèse Joséphine Goethals, and they had three children. He died at Ixelles on 2 April 1934.

== Honours ==
- Kingdom of Belgium :
  - Grand Officer Order of Leopold
  - Grand Officer Order of the Crown
  - War Cross
- Congo Free State : Knight of the Order of the African Star

== Sources ==
- "Belgian Military Leaders". 19 December 2009. Archived from the original on 25 April 2012.
- Société royale de géographie d'Anvers (1907). Bulletin. Vol. 31.
- "LANTONNOIS van RODE, Albert, B.-A". Ars Moriendi. Archived from the original on 25 April 2012.
- "Mill Hill - stichting van Basankusu (1908-1915)". Nieuwsbronnen. Archived from the original on 15 April 2012.
- Marchal, Jules; Delathuy, A. M. (1996). E.D. Morel contre Léopold II (in French). Editions L'Harmattan. ISBN 2-7384-2856-8.
- "Colonial Invasion of Kigezi" (PDF). Politics, Religion and Power in the Great Lakes Region. Codesria. Archived from the original (PDF) on 11 May 2012.
