= Volunteer Combatant's Medal 1914–1918 =

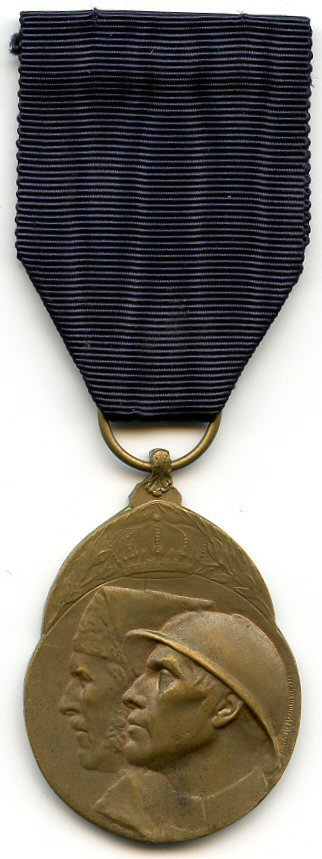
- Volunteer Combatant's Medal 1914–1918 (obverse)
- Type: Military service medal
- Awarded for: Voluntary enlistment in the Belgian Armed Forces
- Presented by: Kingdom of Belgium
- Eligibility: Belgian and foreign citizens
- Status: No longer awarded
- Established: 17 June 1930
- Ribbon of the Volunteer Combatant's Medal 1914–1918

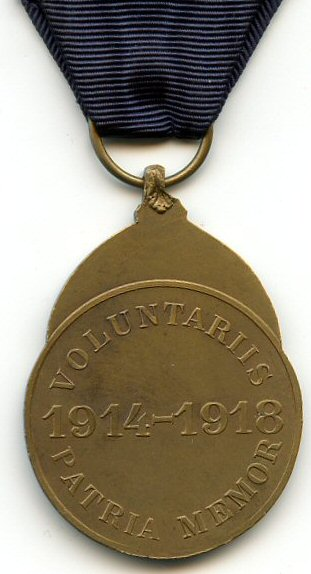
Reverse of the Volunteer Combatant's Medal 1914–1918

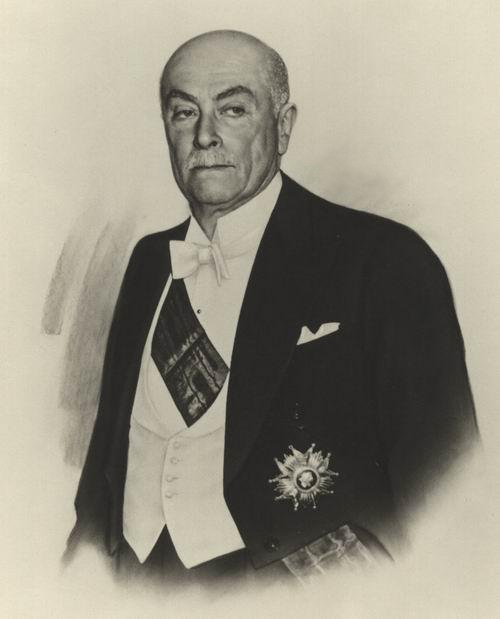
Count Hubert Pierlot, a recipient of the Volunteer Combatant's Medal 1914–1918

The Volunteer Combatant's Medal 1914–1918 (French: Médaille du Combattant Volontaire 1914–18, Dutch: Medaille van de Vrijwillige Strijder 1914–1918) was a Belgian wartime service medal established by royal decree on 17 June 1930 and awarded to Belgian citizens and foreign nationals who voluntarily enlisted for service in the Belgian Armed Forces during World War I.

== Award statute ==
The Volunteer Combatant's Medal 1914–1918 was awarded for voluntary enlistment and service in a combat unit in a danger zone for not less than 6 months during the First World War. Later, the eligibility criteria were extended to include volunteers, older than 40 years of age who had served for 3 months in a combat unit in a danger zone, who were older than 50 years of age who had served for 1 month in a combat unit in a danger zone, and medical personnel who had served for 2 years in non-occupied Belgium. Additional provisions were made regarding awards to youngsters who had fled occupied Belgium and persons who were wounded in action, and posthumous awards.

== Award description ==
The Volunteer Combatant's Medal 1914–1918 was a 36 mm in diameter bronze circular medal topped with a crescent shaped (30 mm at its base) section giving it a nearly oval shape of a height of 50 mm. On its obverse at right front, the relief image of the head of a helmeted First World War Belgian soldier facing left, to his left and partially hidden behind him, the relief image of the head of an 1830 volunteer also facing left and wearing a bonnet typically worn by the revolutionaries. The crescent section bears the relief image of the Belgian crown over laurel branches. On the reverse, along the outer circumference, the Latin inscription "VOLUNTARIIS PATRIA MEMOR", in the center, the years 1914–1918.

The medal was suspended by a ring through the suspension loop to a silk moiré royal blue ribbon.

== Notable recipients (partial list) ==
The individuals listed below were awarded the Volunteer Combatant's Medal 1914–1918:

- Cavalry Lieutenant General Marcel Jooris
- Major General Maurice Jacmart
- Lieutenant General Jean-Baptiste Piron
- Cavalry Major General Baron Beaudoin de Maere d’Aertrycke
- Major General Lucien Van Hoof
- Major General Norbert Stroobants
- Count Gatien du Parc Locmaria
- Baron Joseph van der Elst
- Jacques Delvaux de Fenffe
- Count Hubert Pierlot
- August de Schryver
- Baron Raoul Richard
- Count Georges Moens de Fernig
- Pierre Ryckmans
- Count Adelin d’Oultremont de Wégimont et de Warfusée
- Count Louis Cornet d’Elzius de Ways Ruart
- Baron Robert Goffinet
- Viscount Jacques Davignon
- Count Louis d’Ursel

== See also ==
- Orders, decorations, and medals of Belgium

== Other sources ==
- Quinot H., 1950, Recueil illustré des décorations belges et congolaises, 4e Edition. (Hasselt)
- Cornet R., 1982, Recueil des dispositions légales et réglementaires régissant les ordres nationaux belges. 2e Ed. N.pl., (Brussels)
- Borné A.C., 1985, Distinctions honorifiques de la Belgique, 1830–1985 (Brussels)
