= 6th Infantry Division (Belgium) =

- Active: 1913–1919; 1939–1940
- Disbanded: 28 May 1940
- Country: Belgium
- Branch: Belgian Army
- Type: Infantry Division
- Role: Infantry
- Size: Division
- Part of: II Corps (Belgium)
- Garrison/HQ: Diest
- Engagements: First World War; Second World War; Battle of Belgium

The 6th Infantry Division (6de Infanterie Divisie) was an infantry division of the Belgian Army that existed during the First World War (1914-18) and the Battle of Belgium (1940) during the Second World War.

== History ==
=== World War I ===
At the start of the World War I, the 6th Infantry Division was one of the original seven divisions and was known as the 6th Division. Based in Brussels, the division comprised the 18th, 19th and 20th Mixed Brigades, organised from Grenadier and Carabiner units. The 1st Chasseurs Regiment was also subordinated to the division.

The divisional commanders were:

- Albert Lantonnois van Rode (1913 – January 1915)
- Armand De Ceuninck (January 1915 – April 1917)
- Aloïs Biebuyck (April 1917 – 15 December 1919)

=== World War II ===
As one of the stronger Belgian divisions, with all three of its regiments forming part of the active standing army, the division was assigned a large section of the Albert Canal at the outbreak of war. It covered 14,5 km between Beringen and Eindhout (Geel). To this end, it temporarily received additional fire support from the 2nd, 4th and 16th Artillery Regiments.

On 10 May, the division saw retreating troops from the 11th Division and covering cavalry units passing through its line; some were already bearing the marks of Luftwaffe bombings. Apart from some strafing by German aircraft, the 6th Division was never seriously tested in its strong positions. However, the breakthrough at Ében-Émael necessitated an early retreat to the main line of resistance of the K-W Line. Some time later, the 1st Carabiniers were called back to the Albert Canal to support the general retreat alongside units of the Ninitte Group and the Cavalry Division.

As they moved towards the Canal, the Carabiniers found that the Germans had already crossed the Canal at Kwaadmechelen. After some fighting and mortar duels, the regiment was ordered to retreat to the K-W Line.

By 15 May, the division was in position around the Koningshooikt fortress. Apart from a few small fights between patrols and armored vehicles, there were no big battles until the order was given to retreat towards the Ghent–Terneuzen Canal for a second time. There were no prepared lines available, so trenches had to be dug straight away. By the 20th, the first German patrols arrived, followed by artillery shelling. The 1st Carabiniers stopped the German attempts to cross the canals.

When the German forces reached the English Channel, they were ordered to retreat for a third time, this time to a small canal near the Lys river. Again, hasty defensive positions had to be dug while the enemy followed close by. It was originally supposed to be the section between Balgerhoeke and Strobrugge. But after the Wehrmacht broke through around Kortrijk, two of its regiments were sent to fill the gap and hold the line around Roeselare for a desperate final stand.

The 1st Grenadiers and 9th Line had really intense battles on 27 May. They fought off two big attacks by effectively using mortars, artillery and T-13 tank destroyers. By the end of the day, the Grenadiers had only had to withdraw as a tactical move.

The 1st Carabiniers were the last to stay at the canal, where they saw the 7th and the 23rd crumble under heavy artillery fire to the north. The Germans unsuccessfully tried to get close to the lines of the 1st Carabiniers by having prisoners act as human shields. As it became clear that the bridgeheads to its north could not be contained, its remaining units withdrew to Maldegem where they tried a last stand before the army surrendered. On 27 May, the final breakthrough could not be contained, and the regiment slowly disintegrated.

At least 225 officers, NCO and enlisted were killed in action.

== Organization ==
=== 1940 ===
Structure of the division at the eve of the Battle of Belgium:

- Headquarters, at Diest
- Commanding Officer, 6th Division - Major General Emile Janssens
  - 1st Grenadier Regiment
  - 1st Carabinier Regiment
  - 9th Line Regiment
  - 6th Artillery Regiment
  - 6th Bicycle Squadron
  - 7th Engineer Battalion
  - 6th Signal Battalion
  - 1st Divisional Anti-Tank Gun Company (lorried)
  - 2nd Divisional Anti-Tank Gun Company (lorried) - to 17th Infantry Division
  - 6th Divisional Supply Battalion
  - 6th Divisional Field Hospital Battalion
  - 6th Divisional Quartermasters Company
  - 6th Divisional Military Police Unit

== See also ==
- Belgian Army order of battle (1940)
