= Émile Dossin de Saint-Georges =

Belgian Army general

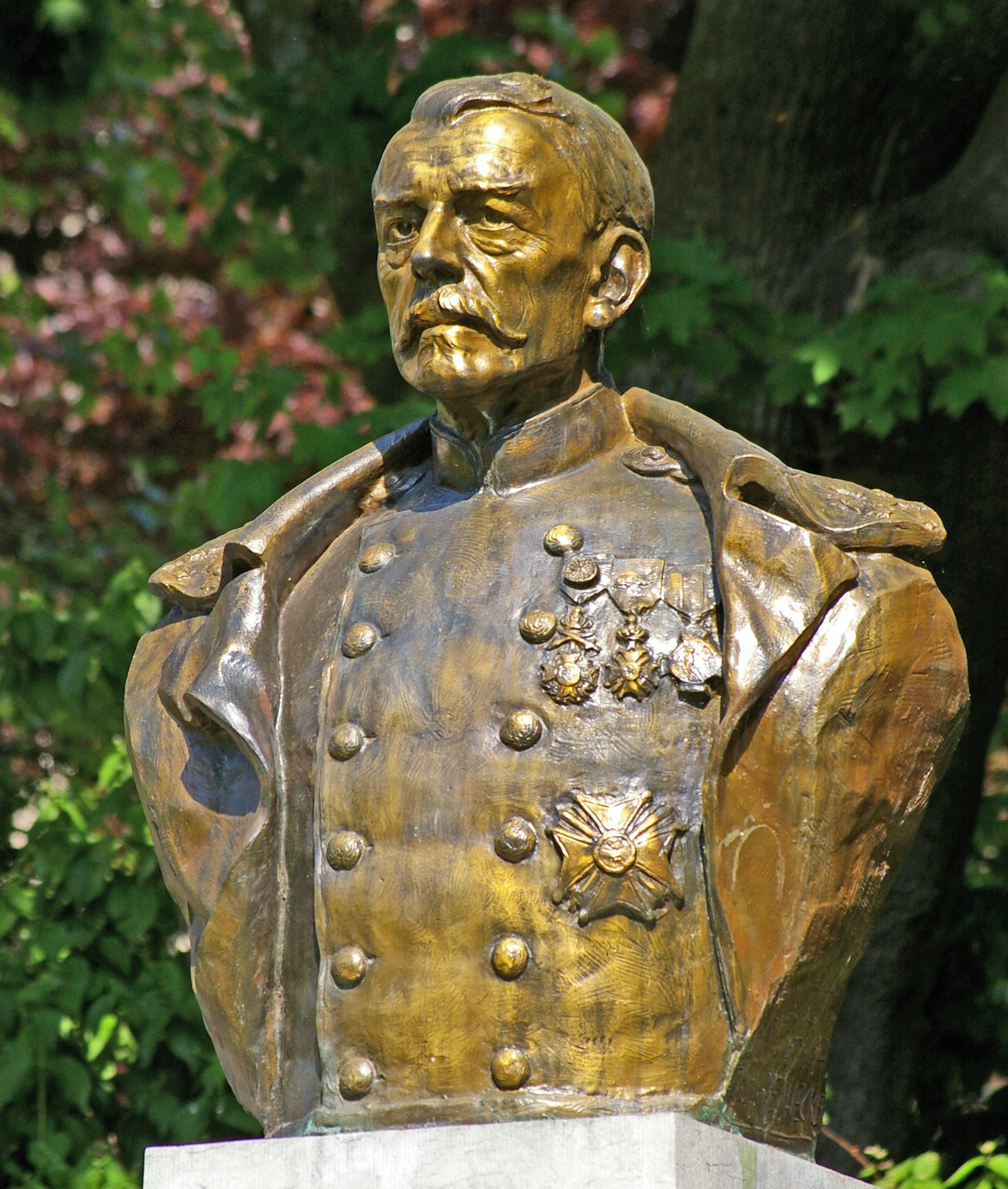
- Born: Émile Jean Henri Dossin; 18 June 1854; Liège, Belgium
- Died: 18 January 1936 (aged 81); Ixelles, Brussels, Belgium
- Military career
- Allegiance: Belgium
- Commands: 2nd Infantry Division (Belgium)
- Conflicts: World War I; Siege of Antwerp; Battle of the Yser

Émile Dossin de Saint-Georges CBE, born Émile Jean Henri Dossin (18 July 1854 – 18 January 1936), was a Belgian Lieutenant-General and one of the foremost Belgian generals of World War I. Made Baron of Sint-Joris (Saint-Georges in French), a notable barracks at Mechelen (Dossin Barracks) was named in his honour in 1936.

== Career ==
In the years before World War I, Dossin served in various positions in the École de guerre and in an advisory capacity in the Ministry of War. In 1913, he was given command of the 18th Mixed Brigade and in 1914 given command of the 2nd Division of the Army, playing a notable part during the retreat from Antwerp and in the Battle of the Yser.
Between 1915 and 1919, he served a Military envoy of the Belgian government in exile (of Charles de Broqueville) in Le Havre. He finished his career as Lieutenant-general.

== Honours ==
- Belgium:
  - Grand Officer of the Order of Leopold.
  - commander Order of the Crown
  - War Cross
- United Kingdom: Commander Order of the British Empire
- Kingdom of the Netherlands: commander Order of Orange-Nassau
- Kingdom of Romania: Commander Order of the Star of Romania
