= Aloïs Biebuyck =

Belgian Army general

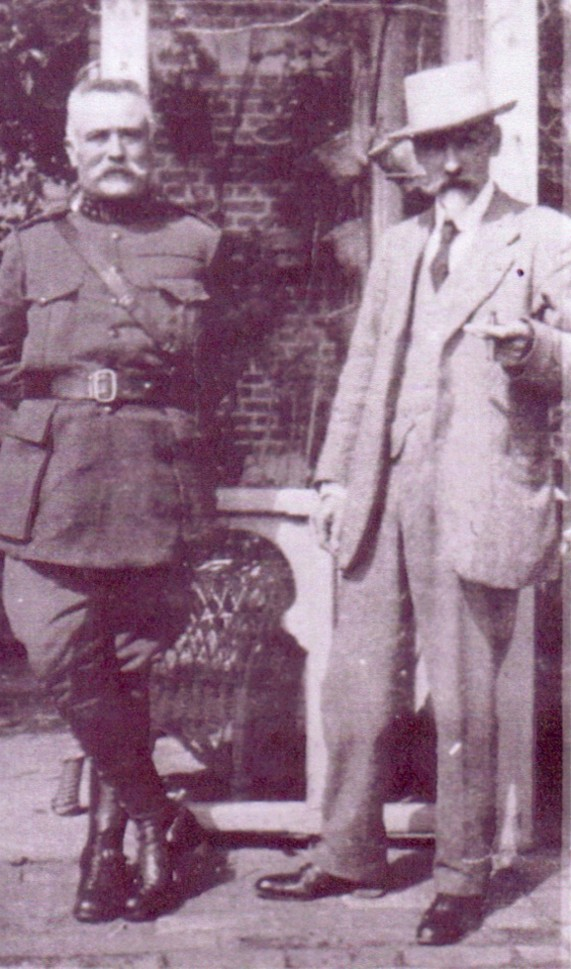
- Aloïs Biebuyck and painter Emile Claus, both from Sint-Eloois-Vijve
- Born: 28 June 1860; Sint-Eloois-Vijve, Belgium
- Died: 28 January 1944 (aged 83); Elsene, Belgium
- Military career
- Allegiance: Belgium
- Rank: Lieutenant General
- Unit: 2nd Carabinier regiment
- Commands: 6th Army division
- Conflicts: First World War

Aloïs Biebuyck ( 28 June 1860 – 28 January 1944) was a Belgian Lieutenant General who fought in the First World War.

Aloïs lost both parents at a young age and was raised by his uncle in Brussels. He followed a military career and became a major in 1906 and a colonel in June 1914.

In World War I, he defended with the 2nd Carabinier regiment the Nete River between Lier and Duffel.
At the Battle of the Yser, he personally led the 3rd Carabinier regiment in a counteroffensive near Pervijze on 22 October 1914. He was hit by three bullets and transported to the hospital in Calais, where his son lieutenant Marcel Biebuyck died in his presence on 29 March 1915.

After seven months in hospital, Aloïs returned to the front on 14 May 1915. He was promoted to Major-General on 11 June 1915, Aide-de-camp of King Albert I on 1 August 1915, and Lieutenant-General on 30 March 1916.
He became commander of the 6th Army division on 8 August 1917, and in the Fifth Battle of Ypres he led the four Infantry divisions in the South Group of the Belgian Army to victory between 28 September and 14 October 1918 in conquering Passendale and Moorslede. By 11 November 1918, his troops had reached the Lys River between Harelbeke and Deinze.

After the war, he received many awards and 2 streets were named after him. He retired on 1 July 1925 and died in 1944.

== Sources ==
- Het Vijvenaarke (in Dutch)
- Ars moriendi (in Dutch)
