= 15th Cavalry =

15th Cavalry may refer to:

== Divisions ==
- 15th Cavalry Division (Russian Empire)
- 15th Cavalry Division (Soviet Union)
- 15th Cavalry Division (United States)

== Brigades ==
- 15th (Imperial Service) Cavalry Brigade
- 15th Mounted Brigade

== Regiments ==
- 15th Cavalry Regiment (United States)
- 15th Lancers
- 15th Lancers (Cureton's Multanis)
- 15th The King's Hussars
- XV Corps Cavalry Regiment
- Royal German Cavalry Regiment, also known as the 15th Cavalry Regiment

=== American Civil War regiments ===
==== Union Army ====
- 15th Illinois Cavalry Regiment
- 15th Kansas Cavalry Regiment
- 15th Kentucky Cavalry Regiment
- 15th Pennsylvania Cavalry Regiment

==== Confederate Army ====
- 15th Confederate Cavalry Regiment
- 15th Texas Cavalry Regiment
- 15th Virginia Cavalry Regiment

== Battalions and companies ==
- 15th (Hampshire Carabiniers) Battalion, Hampshire Regiment
- 15th (Suffolk Yeomanry) Battalion, Suffolk Regiment
- 15th (Northumberland) Company, Imperial Yeomanry

== See also ==
- 15th Division (disambiguation)
- 15th Brigade (disambiguation)
- 15th Regiment (disambiguation)
- 15th (disambiguation)
