= Fifteenth =

Fifteenth or 15th may refer to:

- Ordinal form of the number 15 (number)
- A fraction, 1/15, equal to one of 15 equal parts
- "The 15th", a 1979 song by Wire
- Fifteenth of the month, a recurring calendar date
- Fifteenth (interval)

== Geography ==
- 15th meridian east, a line of longitude
- 15th meridian west, a line of longitude
- 15th parallel north, a circle of latitude
- 15th parallel south, a circle of latitude
- 15th Avenue
- 15th district (disambiguation)
- 15th Street (disambiguation)

== Military ==
- Fifteenth Army (disambiguation)
- 15th Division (disambiguation)
- 15th Regiment (disambiguation)
- 15th Squadron (disambiguation)

== History ==
- Fifteenth (tax), medieval English tax
- Fifteenth Amendment (disambiguation)
  - Fifteenth Amendment to the United States Constitution
- 15th century
- 15th century BC

== See also ==
- 15 (disambiguation)
