= XV Corps =

15th Corps, Fifteenth Corps, or XV Corps may refer to:

== Germany ==
=== German Empire ===
- XV Corps (German Empire), Imperial German Army, prior to and during World War I
- XV Royal Bavarian Reserve Corps, Bavarian Army and Imperial German Army, World War I

=== Nazi Germany ===
- XV Army Corps (Wehrmacht)
- XV Mountain Corps, Wehrmacht
- XV SS Cossack Cavalry Corps, Waffen-SS

== Russia and Soviet Union ==
=== Russian Empire ===
- 15th Army Corps (Russian Empire), World War I

=== Soviet Union ===
- 15th Rifle Corps, World War II
- 15th Tank Corps

== United Kingdom ==
- XV Corps (United Kingdom), World War I

=== Artillery Volunteer Corps ===
- 15th (Partick) Lanarkshire Artillery Volunteer Corps
- 15th Lancashire Artillery Volunteer Corps

=== Rifle Volunteer Corps ===
- 15th (Darlington) Durham Rifle Volunteer Corps
- 15th (Stow-on-the-Wold) Gloucestershire Rifle Volunteer Corps
- 15th (London Scottish) Middlesex Rifle Volunteer Corps
- 15th Middlesex (The Customs and Docks) Rifle Volunteer Corps
- 15th (Procurators) Lanarkshire Rifle Volunteer Corps
- 15th (Brierley Hill) Staffordshire Rifle Volunteer Corps
- 15th (Bognor) Sussex Rifle Volunteer Corps

== United States ==
- XV Corps (United States), World War II
- XV Corps (Union Army), American Civil War

== Other countries ==
- XV Corps (British India)
- 15th Airborne Corps, Chinese Air Force
- XV Corps (India)
- XV Army Corps (Italy)
- XV Corps (Ottoman Empire), World War I
- 15th Army Corps (Ukraine)

== See also ==
- List of military corps by number
- 15th Army (disambiguation)
- 15th Division (disambiguation)
- 15th Group (disambiguation)
- 15th Wing (disambiguation)
- 15th Brigade (disambiguation)
- 15th Regiment (disambiguation)
- 15th Squadron (disambiguation)
- 15th (disambiguation)
- XV (disambiguation)
