= 15th Group =

15th Group may refer to:

- No. 15 Group RAF, a formation of the UK Royal Air Force
- 15th Carrier Air Group, a formation of the United Kingdom Royal Navy
- 15th Army Group, a formation of the United States and United Kingdom armies during World War II

== See also ==
- XV Corps (disambiguation)
- 15th Army (disambiguation)
- 15th Division (disambiguation)
- 15th Wing (disambiguation)
- 15th Brigade (disambiguation)
- 15th Regiment (disambiguation)
- 15 Squadron (disambiguation)
