= 15th Wing (disambiguation) =

The 15th Wing is a wing of the United States Air Force.

15th Wing may also refer to:

- 15th Air Transport Wing, a unit of the Belgian Air Force
- 15th Bombardment Wing, a unit of the United States Air Force
- 15th Bombardment Operational Training Wing, a unit of the United States Air Force
- 15th Strike Wing, a unit of the Philippine Air Force
- 15 Wing Moose Jaw, a Canadian Forces base

== See also ==
- XV Corps (disambiguation)
- 15th Army (disambiguation)
- 15th Division (disambiguation)
- 15th Group (disambiguation)
- 15th Brigade (disambiguation)
- 15th Regiment (disambiguation)
- 15 Squadron (disambiguation)
