= 15th Rifle Division =

15th Rifle Division can refer to:

- 15th Guards Motor Rifle Division, Soviet Union
- 15th Guards Rifle Division, Soviet Union
- 15th Rifle Division (Soviet Union)

== See also ==
- 15th Division (disambiguation)
