= 15th Division =

In military terms, 15th Division or 15th Infantry Division may refer to:

== Infantry divisions ==
- 15th Infantry Division (Belgium)
- 15th Infantry Division (France)
- 15th Military Division, Vichy France
- 15th Division (German Empire), a unit of the Prussian/German Army, later 15th Infantry Division
- 15th Landwehr Division, German Empire
- 15th Reserve Division, a unit of the Imperial German Army in World War I
- 15th Infantry Division (Wehrmacht), formed on 1 October 1934 in Würzburg under the cover name Artillerieführer V
- 15th Panzergrenadier Division, Wehrmacht
- 15th Infantry Division (Greece), (Greek: XV Μεραρχία Πεζικού (XV ΜΠ); XV Merarchía Pezikoú), an infantry division of the Hellenic Army
- 15th Waffen Grenadier Division of the SS (1st Latvian), an Infantry Division of the Waffen SS during World War II
- 15th Division (Imperial Japanese Army), an infantry division in the Imperial Japanese Army
- 15th Infantry Division (India), British Indian Army during World War I
- 15th Infantry Division (Iraq)
- 15th Infantry Division "Bergamo" (Italy)
- 15th Division (North Korea), a military formation of the Korean People's Army during the 20th Century
- 15th Infantry Division (Philippines)
- 15th Infantry Division (Poland), a unit of the Polish Army in the interbellum period
- 15th Infantry Division (Russian Empire)
- 15th Infantry Division (South Korea)
- 15th Guards Airborne Division, Soviet Union
- 15th Guards Mechanized Division, Soviet Union
- 15th Guards Motor Rifle Division, Soviet Union
- 15th Guards Rifle Division, Soviet Union
- 15th Mechanized Division, Soviet Union
- 15th Rifle Division (Soviet Union), a military formation of the Red Army active during the Russian Civil War and World War II
- 15th Special Forces Division, Syria
- 15th Infantry Division (Thailand)
- 15th (Scottish) Division, an infantry division of the British Army that fought in the First World War
- 15th (Scottish) Infantry Division, an infantry division of the British Army that fought in the Second World War
- 15th Division (United States National Guard)
- 15th Infantry Division (United States)
- 15th Division (Yugoslav Partisans) (1943–1945)

== Cavalry divisions ==
- 15th Cavalry Division (Russian Empire)
- 15th Cavalry Division (United States), created in 1917 at Fort Sam Houston, Texas

== Armoured divisions ==
- 15th Panzer Division, Wehrmacht, Germany
- 15th Guards Tank Division, Russia/Soviet Union
- 15th Tank Division (Soviet Union)

== Aviation divisions ==
- 15th Fighter Aviation Division, People's Liberation Army Air Force
- 15th Air Division (Provisional), United States, Gulf War

== Air defense divisions ==
- 15th Anti-Aircraft Artillery Division, Soviet Union
- 15th Air Defense Division, Yugoslavia

== See also ==
- 15th Army (disambiguation)
- XV Corps (disambiguation)
- 15th Group (disambiguation)
- 15th Brigade (disambiguation)
- 15th Regiment (disambiguation)
- 15th Wing (disambiguation)
- 15 Squadron (disambiguation)
