= Fifteenth Army =

15th Army or Fifteenth Army may refer to:

- 15th Army (Wehrmacht), a formation of the German Army during World War II
- Fifteenth Army (Japan), a formation of the Imperial Japanese Army during World War II
- Fifteenth Area Army, a formation of the Imperial Japanese Army during World War II
- 15th Army (People's Republic of China), former name of the Chinese People's Liberation Army's 15th Airborne Corps
- 15th Aerospace Forces Army, Russia
- 15th Army (RSFSR)
- 15th Army (Soviet Union)
- 15th Air Army, Soviet Union
- 15th Army Group, a combined formation of the United Kingdom and United States armies during World War II
- Fifteenth United States Army, a formation of the United States Army during World War II

== See also ==
- List of armies by number
- XV Corps (disambiguation)
- 15th Division (disambiguation)
- 15th Brigade (disambiguation)
- 15th Regiment (disambiguation)
- 15th Group (disambiguation)
- 15th Wing (disambiguation)
- 15th Squadron (disambiguation)
- 15th (disambiguation)
