= Thomas Nevill, 5th Baron Furnivall =

Late medieval English nobleman

Arms of Neville: Gules, a saltire argent

Thomas Nevill, 5th Baron Furnivall (died 1407), was a late-14th and early-15th century English nobleman of the House of Neville. He was the son of John Neville, 3rd Baron Neville and Elizabeth Latimer, 5th Baroness Latimer, and the younger brother of Ralph Neville, later Earl of Westmorland.

By 1379, Nevill had married Joan Furnivall, after which he took the title of Baron Furnivall jure uxoris. Furnivall was summoned for military service by Richard II before the 1385 invasion of Scotland in July, and to parliament by his new title on his return the following month. Here he was appointed a peace negotiator with the Scots.

He acquitted himself honourably in battle against the Percy's at the Shrewsbury in 1403, and was a member of his brother's council, helping plan Westmorland's campaign again the rebellious Percy family in the north. Furnivall had been steward of the royal household and councillor of Richard II, and was promoted to Treasurer of the Exchequer by Henry IV from 1404 to his death in March 1407. In this capacity he received the begging poem of Thomas Hoccleve, Male Regia, urging Furnival to pay him his wages as a Privy Seal clerk; Hoccleve's technique is to allow Furnivall to "feel superior, and thus, with a little luck, generous". An important servant of the crown—he was the only noble to sit on the West Riding quarter sessions—and one of the richest nobles in Yorkshire, he also able to lend the king large sums of money, totalling £6,362. Furnivall held the new King's sceptre and staff at his coronoation in 1399. At the Parliament of 1404 in Coventry, the Commons voted the King two taxes on the fifteenth, "on condition that the money went to the Lord Furnivall for use in the wars of the King". Furnival by now was War Treasurer. Historian Chris Given-Wilson has described Furnivall as of the "buyers of land, builders of castles, patrons of religious houses, and lenders of money, [who was] outstanding among their generation".

Thomas and Joan had one daughter, Maud, who married John Talbot—later Earl of Shrewsbury—which took the Furnival barony out of Neville hands for good. Furnivall married twice. Joan died in 1401, and the same year he married—without royal licence—Ankarette Talbot, a widow and heiress to the estates of John Lestrange. Ankarette was the mother of his daughter's husband. Furnivall was buried with Joan in Worksop Priory
