= 15th Infantry =

15th Infantry may refer to:

- 15th Infantry Division (disambiguation)
- 15th Infantry Brigade (disambiguation)
- 15th Infantry Regiment (disambiguation)

== See also ==
- 15th (disambiguation)
