= 15th Brigade =

15th Brigade or 15th Infantry Brigade may refer to:

== Australia ==
- 15th Brigade (Australia)

== Brazil ==
- 15th Brigade (Brazil)

== Greece ==
- 15th Infantry Brigade (Greece)

== Hungary ==
- 15th Infantry Brigade (Hungary)

== India ==
- 15th (Imperial Service) Cavalry Brigade
- 15th Indian Infantry Brigade

== Indonesia ==
- 15th Infantry Brigade (Indonesia)

== Japan ==
- 15th Brigade (Japan)

== New Zealand ==
- 15th Brigade (New Zealand)

== Romania ==
- 15th Mechanized Brigade

== Russia ==
- 15th Separate Guards Motor Rifle Brigade

== Slovenia ==
- 15th Aviation Brigade (Slovenian Armed Forces)

== Soviet Union ==
- 15th Independent Special Forces Brigade

== Spain ==
- XV International Brigade

== Ukraine ==
- 15th Artillery Reconnaissance Brigade
- 15th Operational Brigade
- 15th Transport Aviation Brigade

== United Kingdom ==
- 15th Anti-Aircraft Brigade
- 15th Infantry Brigade (United Kingdom)
- 15th Mounted Brigade
- 15th Reserve Brigade

=== Artillery units ===
- 15th Brigade Royal Field Artillery
- XV Brigade, Royal Horse Artillery

== United States ==
- 15th Military Police Brigade
- 15th Signal Brigade
- 15th Sustainment Brigade

== See also ==
- XV Corps (disambiguation)
- 15th Army (disambiguation)
- 15th Division (disambiguation)
- 15th Group (disambiguation)
- 15th Wing (disambiguation)
- 15th Regiment (disambiguation)
- 15 Squadron (disambiguation)
