= Battle of Beitang =

1900 conflict

- Part of the Boxer Rebellion
Date	20 September 1900
Location	Beitang, China
Result	Russo-German-French victory

Belligerents
Eight-Nation Alliance; Russia; Germany; France	Qing dynasty

Commanders and leaders
(Russian Empire) G. von Stackelberg (German Empire) Lothar von Trotha (French Third Republic) Alfred-Amédée Dodds	(Qing dynasty) Dong Fuxiang (Qing dynasty) Jiang Guiti (Qing dynasty) Ma Yukun

Strength
Unknown	Unknown

Casualties and losses
Unknown	Unknown

The Battle of Beitang, during the Boxer Rebellion, was fought on September 20, 1900, between the Eight Nation Alliance and the Great Qing army.

== Background ==
Beitang is 5 mi (8.0 km) north of Tianjin. It was necessary to capture Beitang for organising railway connection between Tianjin and Manchuria.

During the night, Russian troops captured a Chinese position near the destroyed Beitang railway station, and built several batteries. In the morning, Russian and German cannons began to bombard the fortress, and at 10 a.m. the Chinese garrison fled. At noon, the fortress was captured without fighting.

== Sources ==
- Д.Г.Янчевецкий "У стен недвижного Китая". Санкт-Петербург - Порт-Артур, 1903 (D.G.Yanchevetskiy "Near the Walls of unmoving China", Sankt-Peterburg - Port-Artur, 1903)
- В. Г. Дацышен «Русско-китайская война 1900 года. Поход на Пекин» — СПБ, 1999. ISBN 5-8172-0011-2 (V.G.Datsishen "Russo-chinese war of 1900. March to Beijing", Sankt-Peterburg, 1999)
