= Konstantin von Stackelberg =

Baltic German composer

Freiherr Konstantin von Stackelberg
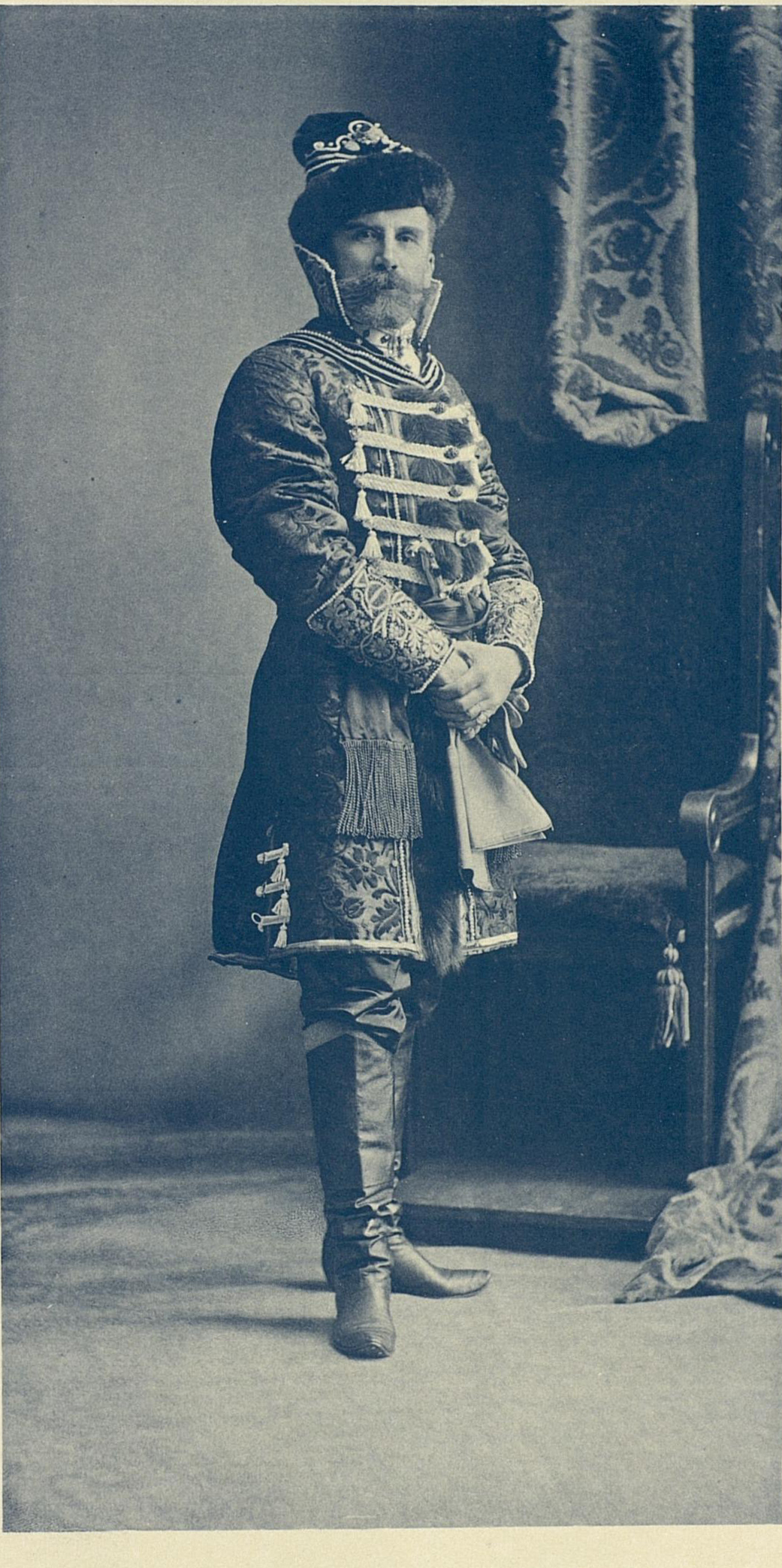
- Baron von Stackelberg in 17th century Russian court clothing during the 1903 Ball.
- Born: 15 June [O.S. 3] 1848; Strelna, St. Petersburg, Russian Empire
- Died: 30 March 1925 (aged 76); Tallinn, Estonia
- Burial place: Narva
- Children: 2 children
- Military career
- Allegiance: Russian Empire
- Branch: Imperial Russian Army
- Service years: 1866-1917
- Rank: General of the Cavalry

Konstantin Nikolai Freiherr von Stackelberg (Russian: Константи́н Ка́рлович Шта́кельберг, tr. Konstantín Kárlovich Shtákelʹberg; 15 June [O.S. 3] 1848 – 30 March 1925) was a Baltic German composer and cavalry general in the Imperial Russian Army. Stackelberg was best known for his compositions on music about the White Army during the Russian Civil War. He was the head of the Imperial Music Choir from 1883 to 1917 (now the St. Petersburg Philharmonic Orchestra) and was also involved in improving the music in the Russian Army and Navy.

His brother was Georg von Stackelberg, and their maternal grandfather was Maurycy Hauke, making them first cousins to Alexander I of Bulgaria, and Louis of Battenberg, Marquess of Milford Haven.

He was awarded Order of Prince Danilo I, Order of the Cross of Takovo and a number of other decorations.
