= 15th Military Police Brigade =

United States Military unit

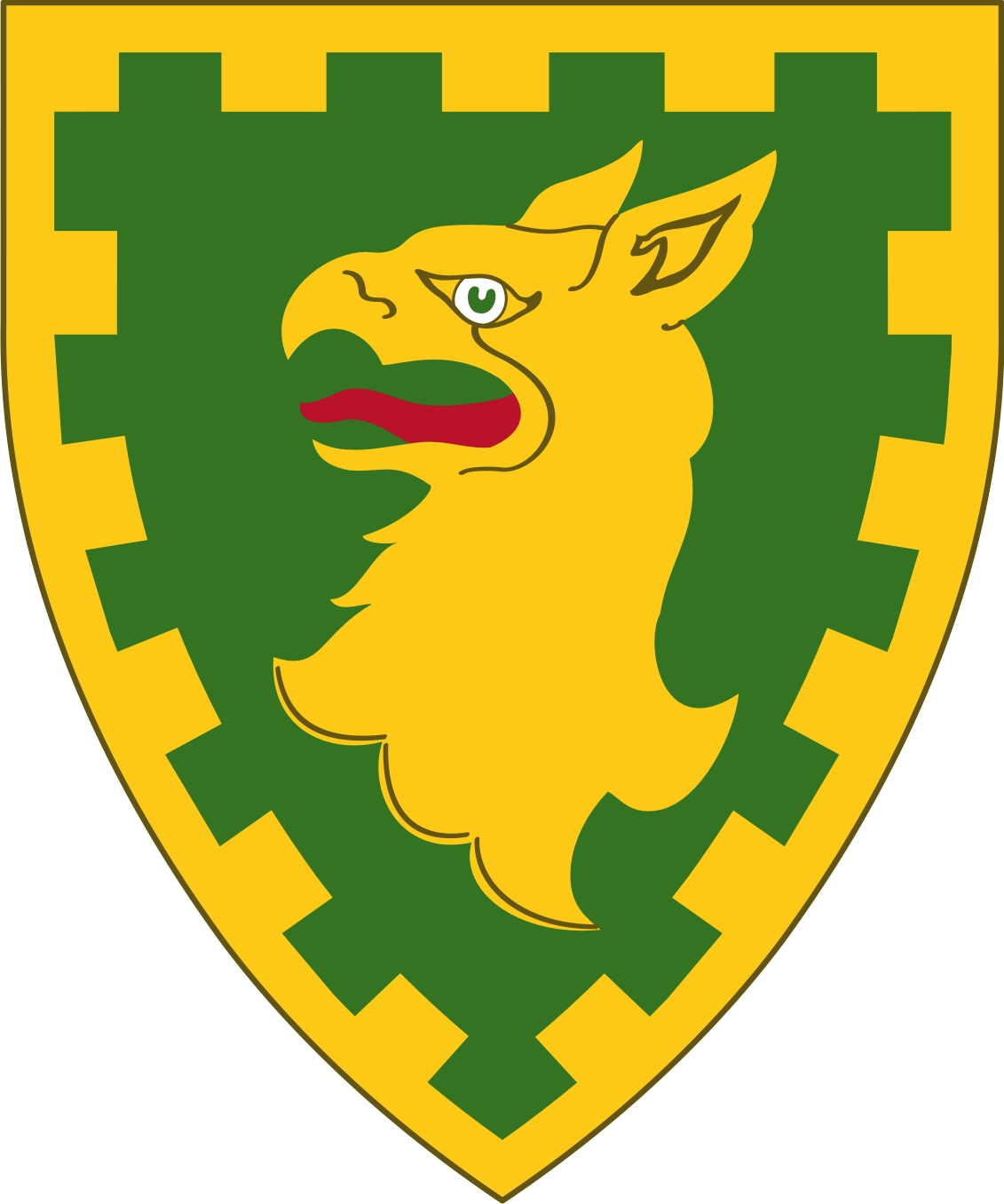
- Shoulder Sleeve Insignia
- Active: 25 June 1965 – 30 June 1976; 28 Sept 2010 – Present
- Country: United States
- Branch: United States Army
- Role: Military Police
- Size: Brigade
- Part of: United States Army Corrections Command
- Garrison/HQ: Fort Leavenworth, Kansas
- Mottos: Duty Justice and Loyalty
- Colors: Green and Gold

Commanders
- Current commander: Col. Michael A. Johnston

Insignia
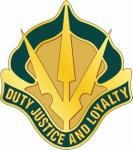
- Distinctive unit insignia

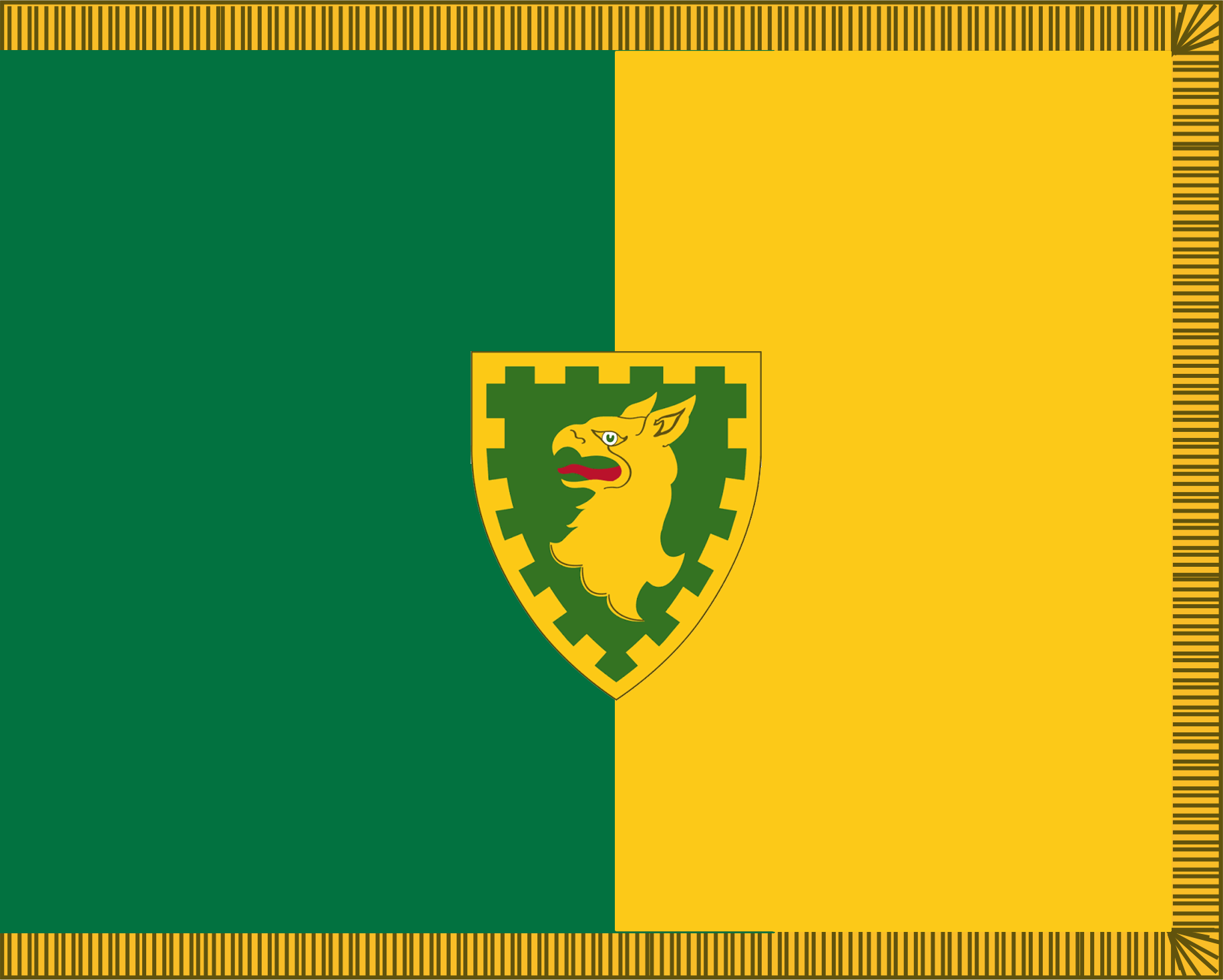
- 15th Military Police Brigade Flag

The 15th Military Police Brigade, stationed at Fort Leavenworth, Kansas, is an active duty United States Army corrections and detention brigade under the United States Army Corrections Command.

== History ==
Originally stationed in Germany, the 15th Military Police Brigade was the first military police brigade activated in the U.S. Army, only to be deactivated in 1976. On 28 Sept 2010, the United States Army Correctional Brigade was reflagged as the 15th Military Police Brigade.

== Subordinate units ==
- 40th Military Police Battalion (Detention), which oversees operations of the U.S. Disciplinary Barracks.
- 705th Military Police Battalion (Detention), which oversees operations of the Joint Regional Correctional Facility.
