= Georg von Stackelberg =

General of the Imperial Russian Army during the late 19th and early 20th century

Freiherr Georg August Paul von Stackelberg
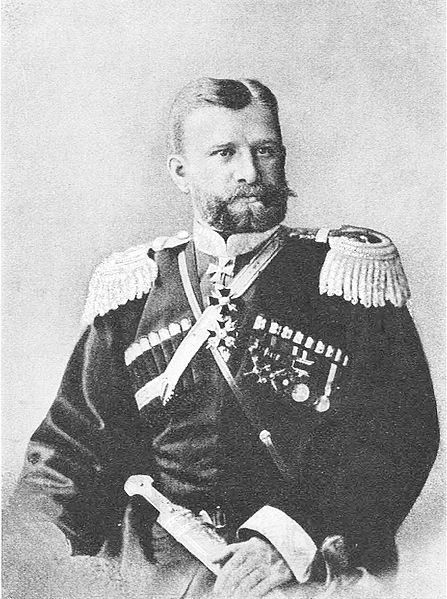
- General Georg von Stackelberg.
- Born: 30 July [O.S. 18] 1851; St. Petersburg, Russian Empire
- Died: 25 July [O.S. 12] 1913 (aged 61); Hungerburg, Kreis Wierland, Governorate of Estonia, Russian Empire (present-day Narva-Jõesuu, Ida-Viru County, Estonia)
- Other name: Georgy Karlovich Stackelberg
- Military career
- Allegiance: Russian Empire
- Branch: Russian Imperial Army
- Service years: 1869–1913
- Rank: General of the Cavalry
- Commands: 15th Cavalry Division; 10th Cavalry Division; 2nd Siberian Army Corps; 1st Siberian Army Corps
- Conflicts: Russian conquest of Central Asia; Khivan campaign of 1873; Kokand campaign of 1875-1876; Russo-Turkish War; Boxer Rebellion; Battle of Beitang; Russo-Japanese War; Battle of Te-li-Ssu; Battle of Tashihchiao; Battle of Liaoyang; Battle of Shaho; Battle of Sandepu

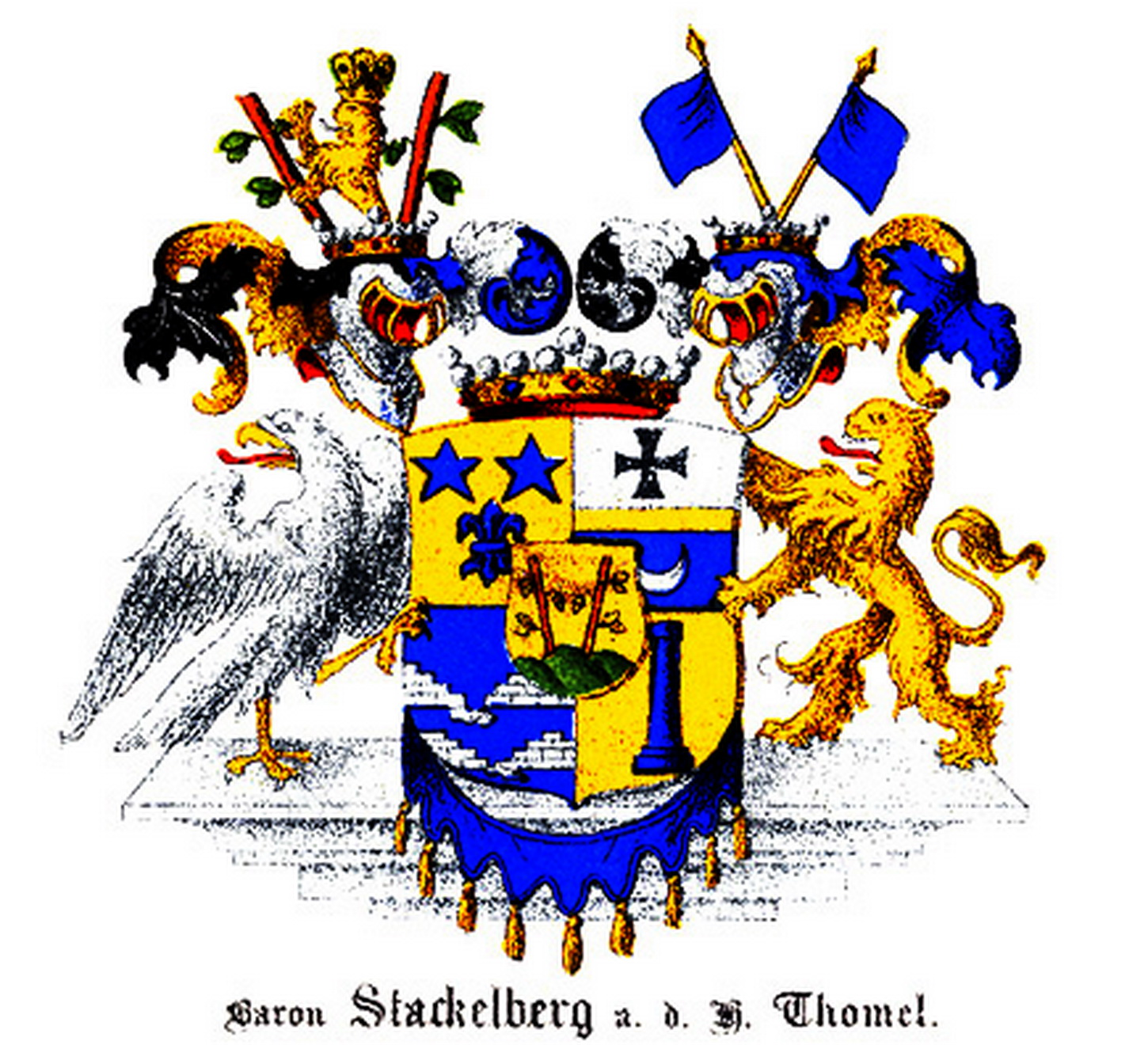
Coat of arms of the Thomel branch of the Stackelberg family of 1728, in the Baltic Coat of arms book by Carl Arvid von Klingspor in 1882.

Georg August Paul Freiherr von Stackelberg (Russian: Георгий Карлович Штакельберг, romanized: Georgij Karlovič Štakel'berg; 30 July [O.S. 18] 1851 – 25 July [O.S. 12] 1913) was a Baltic German cavalry general in the service of the Imperial Russian Army. He was noted for his role during the Russo-Japanese War, especially during the Battle of Sandepu, in which he was awarded the Order of St. George afterwards.

== Biography ==
Stackelberg was from a Baltic German noble family and graduated from the Nicholas General Staff Academy in 1869. His older brother Konstantin was a famous composer and the director of the Imperial Music Choir. (now the St. Petersburg Philharmonic Orchestra). Their maternal grandfather was Maurycy Hauke, making the brothers first cousins to Prince Louis of Battenberg and Ferdinand I of Bulgaria.

As a commander in the 1st Semirechye Cossacks from 1874 to 1876, Stackelberg distinguished himself during the Russian conquest of the Khanate of Khiva and the Kokand expedition of 1875 under General Konstantin von Kaufman. He was wounded in combat, and although nominated for numerous awards, he refused to accept any.

From August 18, 1886, to December 5, 1890, Stackelberg commanded the 25th Dragoon Regiment at Kazan. He was then assigned to command the Trans-Caspian Cossacks until December 3, 1897, followed by the 15th Cavalry Division to May 31, 1899.

Stackelberg was commander of the Russian 10th Cavalry Division during the suppression of the Boxer Rebellion in China and Russian occupation of Manchuria. Afterwards, he was assigned command of the 2nd Siberian Army Corps from April 25, 1901, to February 11, 1902. He was then commander of the 1st Cavalry Corps from February 11, 1902, to February 3, 1904.

From April 5, 1904, during the Russo-Japanese War, Stackelberg was commander of the Russian 1st Siberian Army Corps, which played a major role in the Battle of Te-li-Ssu. Hampered by orders from Russian commander-in-chief General Aleksei Kuropatkin not to commit his entire reserves, and to fight a defensive battle rather than push forward in an offense, his forces were decisively defeated by the Second Japanese Army under General Oku Yasukata. In the subsequent Battle of Sandepu, Stackelberg chose to ignore Kuropatkin's orders and made gains against entrenched Japanese positions, albeit with heavy casualties, but was forced to withdraw when reinforcements were denied. Relieved of his command for insubordination, he was sent back to St Petersburg after the battle, where he was awarded the Order of St. George (4th class) for his actions.

== Honours and awards ==
- Order of St. Stanislaus, 3rd class
- Order of St. Anne 3rd class with Swords
- Order of St. Stanislaus, 2nd class with swords (1873)
- Order of St. Vladimir, 4th class with Swords (1876)
- Order of St. Anne 2nd class with Swords (1877)
- Order of St. Stanislaus, 1st class (1894)
- Order of St. Anne 1st class (1898)
- Order of St. Vladimir, 2nd class with Swords (1901)
- Order of the White Eagle (1901)
- Order of St. Alexander Nevsky (1905)
- Order of St. George, 4th class (1905)
- Golden Weapon with the inscription "For Bravery" (1876)
