= Beitang Subdistrict =

Beitang Subdistrict 北塘街道 Pehtang
- Subdistrict
- Location in Tianjin
- Coordinates: 39°06′23″N 117°43′06″E
- Country: People's Republic of China
- Province: Tianjin
- District: Binhai
- Village-level divisions: 2 residential communities 4 villages
- Elevation: 5 m (16 ft)
- Time zone: UTC+8 (China Standard)

Beitang (Chinese: 北塘; pinyin: Běitáng, meaning "North Pond"), alternately known as Pei-t'ang and Pehtang (amongst other variants), is a subdistrict of the Binhai New Area, Tianjin, People's Republic of China, near the mouth of the Hai River. As of 2011, it administered 2 residential communities (社区) and 4 villages.

== History ==
=== 1900 ===
- September 20 - The Battle of Beitang was fought here between the Eight Nation Alliance and the Great Qing army.

== See also ==
- List of township-level divisions of Tianjin
