= 10th Cavalry Division (Russian Empire) =

- 10-я кавалерийская дивизия
- Active: 1914–1918
- Country: Russian Empire
- Branch: Russian Imperial Army
- Role: Cavalry

The 10th Cavalry Division (Russian: 10-я кавалерийская дивизия, 10-ya Kavaleriiskaya Diviziya) was a cavalry formation of the Russian Imperial Army.

== Organization ==
- 1st Cavalry Brigade
  - Novgorod 10th Regiment of Dragoons
  - Odessa 10th Uhlan Regiment
- 2nd Cavalry Brigade
  - Ingermanland 10th Regiment of Hussars
  - Orenburg 1st Regiment of Cossacks
- 10th Horse Artillery Division

== Commanders (Division Chiefs) ==
- 1897-1899: Vladimir Sukhomlinov
- 1899–1901: Georgii Stackelberg
- 1905: Petr Alexandrovich Mashin (acting)
- 1908-1912: Georgy Ottonovich Rauch

== Chiefs of Staff ==
- 1894-1899: Pavel Savvich
- 1903-1910: Abram Dragomirov

== See also ==
- Battle of Jaroslawice
