= 15th Regiment =

15th Regiment or 15th Infantry Regiment may refer to:

- 15th Field Artillery Regiment (Canada)
- 15th Infantry Regiment (South Korea)
- 15th Regiment of Foot, United Kingdom
- 15th Infantry Regiment (United States)
- 15th Infantry Regiment (USAFIP-NL), part of United States Army Forces in the Philippines – Northern Luzon
- 15th New York National Guard Regiment, United States
- 15th Poznań Uhlan Regiment, Poland
- 15th Guards Motor Rifle Regiment, Russia

== American Revolutionary War regiments ==
- 15th Continental Regiment
- 15th Massachusetts Regiment
- 15th Virginia Regiment

== American Civil War regiments ==
=== Confederate (Southern) Army regiments ===
- 15th South Carolina Infantry Regiment
- 15th Alabama Infantry Regiment

=== Union (Northern) Army regiments ===
- 15th Connecticut Infantry Regiment
- 15th Illinois Infantry Regiment
- 15th Illinois Cavalry Regiment
- 15th Iowa Infantry Regiment
- 15th Massachusetts Infantry Regiment
- 15th West Virginia Infantry Regiment
- 15th Wisconsin Infantry Regiment

== See also ==
- XV Corps (disambiguation)
- 15th Army (disambiguation)
- 15th Division (disambiguation)
- 15th Group (disambiguation)
- 15th Wing (disambiguation)
- 15th Brigade (disambiguation)
- 15 Squadron (disambiguation)
