= 15th Division (Yugoslav Partisans) =

15th Slovenia Division
- Flag of Democratic Federal Yugoslavia (used by the Partisans)
- Active: 1943–1945
- Country: Democratic Federal Yugoslavia
- Branch: Yugoslav Partisan Army
- Type: Infantry
- Size: ~1,600 (upon formation)
- Part of: 7th Corps
- Engagements: World War II in Yugoslavia

Commanders
- Notable commanders: Predrag Jeftić †; Rajko Tanasković

The 15th Slovenian Assault Division (Serbo-Croatian Latin: Petnaesta slovenačka udarna divizija) was Yugoslav Partisan division formed in Dolenjske Toplice on 13 July 1943. Upon formation it had around 1,600 soldiers in three brigades, those being the 4th, 5th and the 6th Slovenia Brigades. First commander of the division was Predrag Jeftić and its political commissar was Viktor Avbelj. Jeftić was killed in action on 30 July 1943 and Rajko Tanasković became the new commander. On 3 October 1943, the division became a part of the 7th Corps.
