= District 15 =

District 15 or 15th district can refer to:

== U.S. political districts ==
Federal level

- Illinois's 15th congressional district
- Michigan's 15th congressional district
- Pennsylvania's 15th congressional district
- Ohio's 15th congressional district

State-level

- 15th Legislative District (New Jersey)
- Pennsylvania Senate, District 15
- Texas Senate, District 15
- Wisconsin Senate, District 15

Municipal level

- Los Angeles City Council District 15

== North American school districts ==
Canada

- New Brunswick School District 15

United States

- Regional School District 15 (Connecticut)
- Community Consolidated School District 15 (Illinois)
- Maine School Administrative District 15 (Maine)

== Other municipal districts ==
- 15th arrondissement of Paris
- 15th arrondissement of Marseille
- 15th district of Budapest
