= HM-15 =

US Navy helicopter squadron

Helicopter Mines Countermeasures Squadron 15
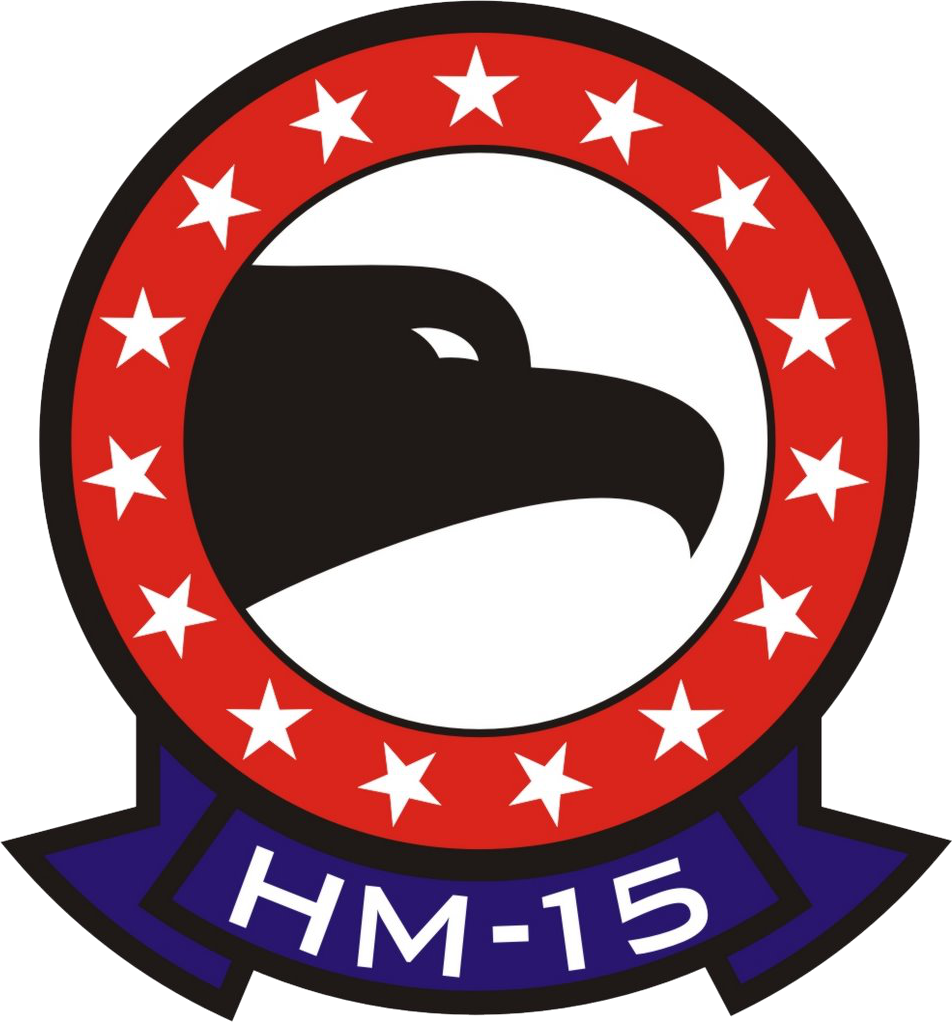
- HM-15 Blackhawks insignia
- Active: 2 January 1987 – present
- Country: United States
- Branch: United States Navy
- Part of: Helicopter Sea Combat Wing, US Atlantic Fleet
- Garrison/HQ: Naval Station Norfolk
- Nickname: Blackhawks
- Engagements: Gulf War
- Decorations: Humanitarian Service Medal; CNO Safety Award (2); Meritorious Unit Commendation (2); Battle Efficiency Award

Helicopter Mine Countermeasures Squadron 15 (HM-15) is a United States Navy helicopter squadron established in 1987 and based at Naval Station Norfolk. Nicknamed the "Blackhawks" and flying the MH-53E Sea Dragon, it is staffed by both active duty and reserve personnel. It is the sister squadron to HM-14, the "Vanguard", based a half-mile away at NS Norfolk.

== History ==
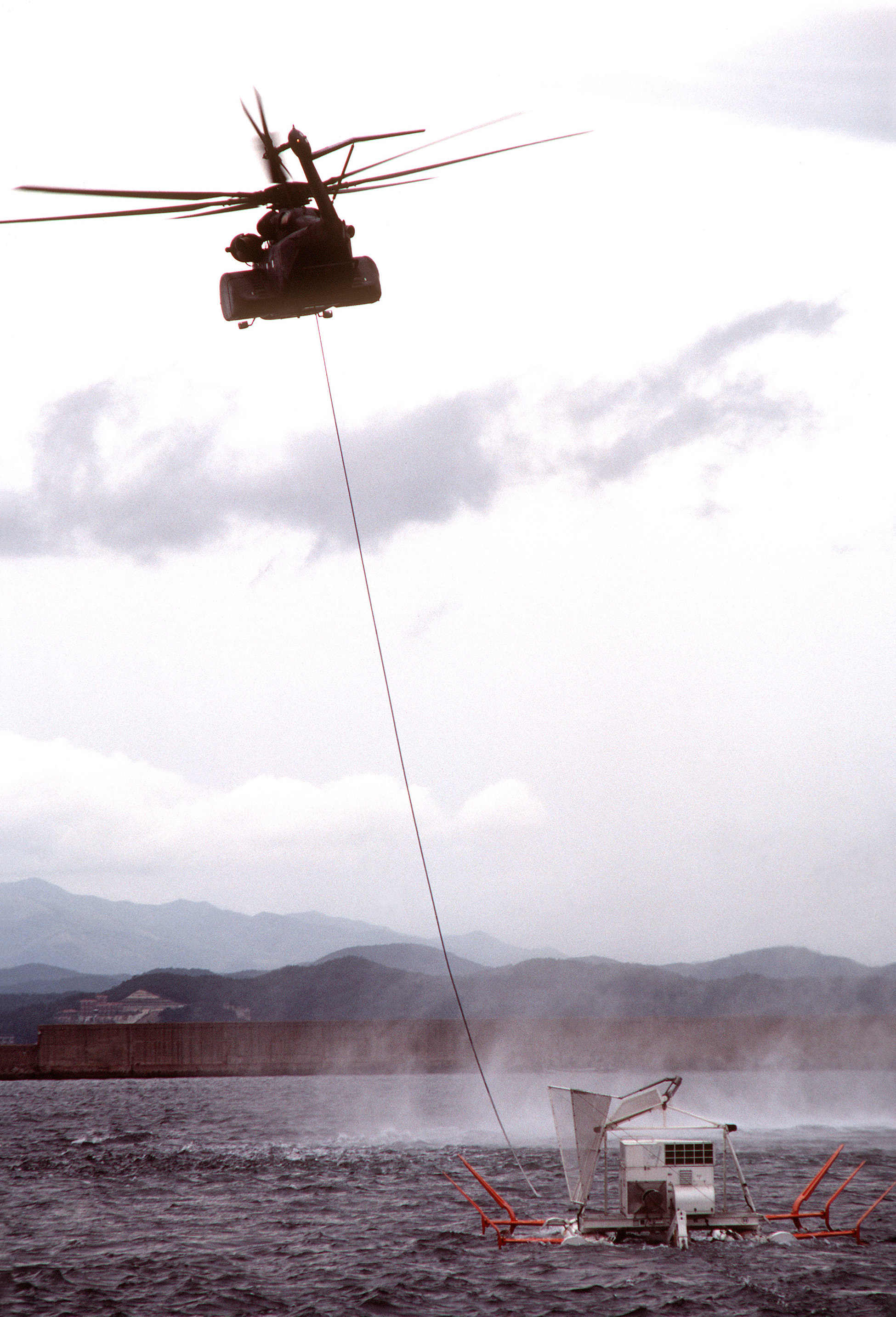
HM-15 MH-53E tows a minesweeping sled while conducting simulated mine clearing operations

HM-15 was established on 2 January 1987, as the first of two similar active duty squadrons at NS Norfolk. On 1 October 1987, the squadron's permanent duty station changed to Naval Air Station Alameda.

In October 1989 the squadron was called upon to provide support for disaster relief effort after the Loma Prieta earthquake in California. To assist they lifted full-size construction backhoe tractors and assisted in other airlift operations. The unit was awarded the Humanitarian Service Medal for their efforts.

The squadron was involved in its first major conflict in 1991 when it deployed a three aircraft, 100 man detachment to the Persian Gulf in support of Operations Desert Shield and Desert Storm. The squadron remained in the theater until April 1992 after transporting over 3.2 million pounds of cargo and more than 4,000 personnel. They have also been involved in Operation Enduring Freedom most notably through deployments to Bahrain.

HM-15 and the reserve squadron HM-19 were the first squadrons in the U.S. Navy to combine and fully integrate active and reserve squadrons. HM-19 was soon afterward decommissioned, with the integrated squadron maintaining the HM-15 designation, mascot, and insignia. The integration was completed on 5 November 1994.

Due to Base Realignment and Closure (BRAC), with the slated closure of NAS Alameda, on 30 June 1996, the permanent duty station of the squadron was officially moved to NAS Corpus Christi. In 2010 it was moved due to BRAC once again and now calls NS Norfolk home.

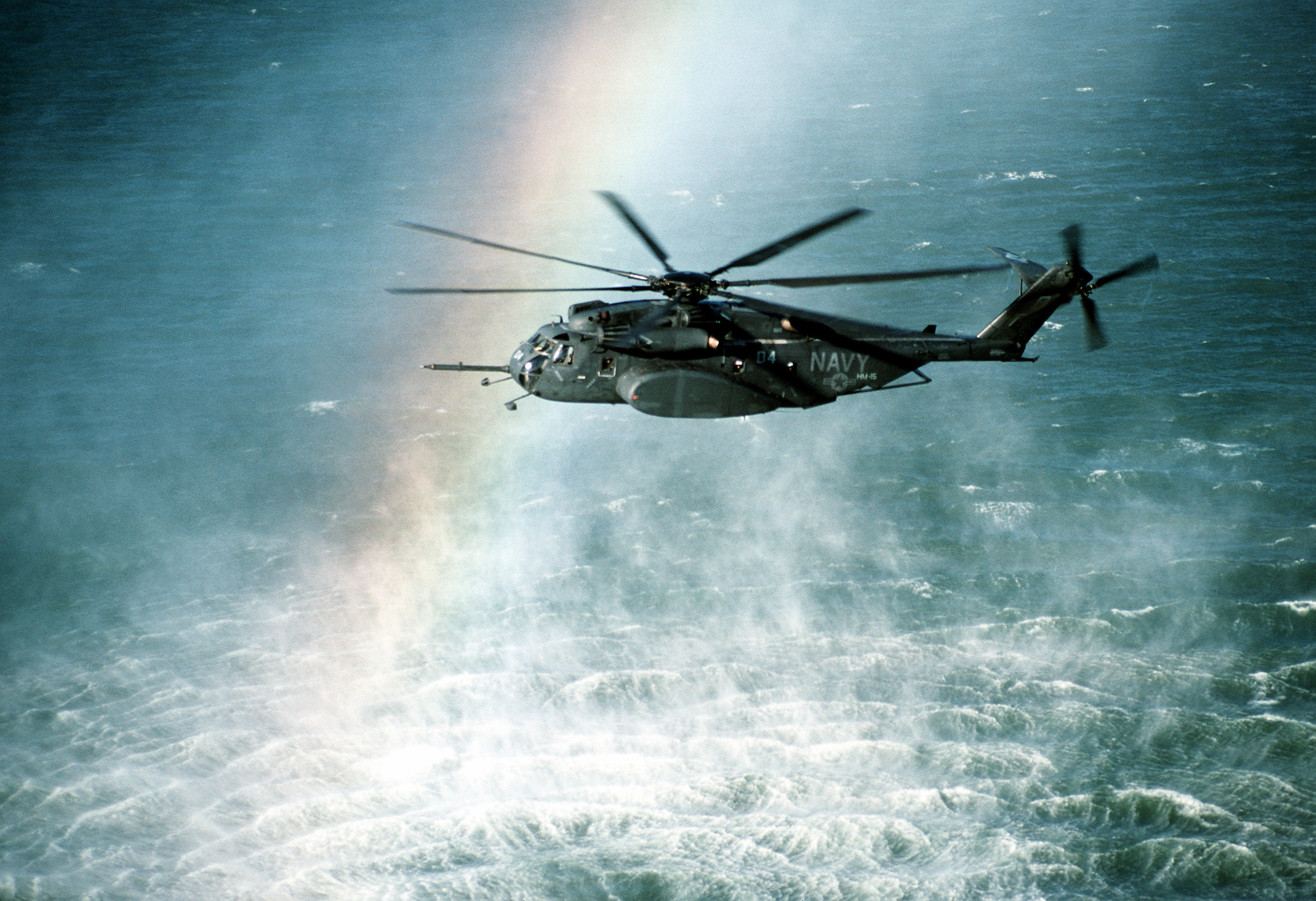
A rainbow is formed in the mist rising from the ocean as an HM-15 MH-53E conducts mine countermeasures operations near Naval Air Station Alameda, 1990.

At times, HM-15 has had more than 750 personnel. Its largest work center, the Line Division, boasts at times nearly a hundred personnel, supporting rotating round the clock operations. Its second largest work center, the Airframes and Hydraulics Shop has almost 60 personnel.

The squadron has deployed to locations like Bahrain, South Korea, the Middle East via the Persian Gulf, Indonesia, and in both the Atlantic and Pacific oceans. HM-15 also took part in Joint Task Force Katrina and was part of Hurricane Katrina relief efforts while working with USS Bataan. She has operated from the flight decks of USS Tripoli, USS Juneau, USS Denver, USS Inchon, USS Saipan, USS Bataan, and USS Kearsarge.

In 1995, HM-15 was awarded the Chief of Naval Operations Safety Award and a Meritorious Unit Commendation.

Again affected by the Base Realignment and Closure Commission in 2005, the squadron moved from NAS Corpus Christi back to where they first started at NS Norfolk.

After a helicopter crash that killed two sailors in Bahrain in July 2012, squadron commander Commander Sara Santoski and Master Chief Petty Officer Bobby T. Anderson were relieved of duty and reassigned.

== Operations ==
An aircrew member from HM-15 on a MK-103 mine sweeping mission aboard an MH-53E near Bahrain

Using the MH-53E Sea Dragon helicopter, they patrol foreign and domestic waters to locate and destroy sea-based mines that would harm watercraft and map safe sea-lanes of travel. Mines can be triggered by any number of methods ranging from contact to an electronic signature. While the aircraft hovers safely above the sea, it is capable of dragging through the water a wide variety of instruments and machines to accomplish the mission. In harbors, coordination with EOD Divers helps to clear more shallow waters safely.

Squadron deployments have been executed all over the globe, for operational, training, humanitarian, and foreign relations tasking.

Due to the capabilities of the huge heavy-lift aircraft used, the squadron also performs the missions of assault support and cargo transport when deployed.

HM-15 was the first squadron to load two MH-53Es into a U.S. Air Force C-5 Galaxy transport aircraft. To do so, all seven blades and the main rotor head is removed, the tail folded, and the helicopter inched slowly into the cabin. The pressure in tires and struts must be lowered and raised at appropriate stages in order to get the main gearbox shaft to clear the overhead while going up the ramp.

It is not rare to see the squadron maintaining an operational "home" detachment while supporting two separately located far-flung deployments in other places of the world.

== Training and other notables ==
HM-15 is the first U.S. Navy squadron to combine and consolidate training requirements between the USN and the USNR. Changes here had ripple effects all the way up to the Chief of Naval Operations (CNO) as instructions were researched and updated.

HM-15 is the first squadron to utilize a fully computerized training documentation system with a graphical user interface (GUI), called "Train 'em!". This training planning and documentation system replaced hundreds of man-hours of hand-documentation, with one or two personnel and a networked database that synchronized with the administration personnel database, and generated the necessary government training logs required for training documentation and inspections, for "ground-pounder", "aircrew", and "officer" training. This system was eventually distributed to sister squadron HM-14 and to other naval commands.

They are the first squadron to boast its own modern IT work center with certified staff to support all IT functions including cabling, networking, database management, and computer maintenance. This capability was replaced by the Navy and Marine Corps Intranet (NMCI) in 2002.

HM-15 maintains a trainer with a full size articulated mock-up of the cabin and gear of an MH-53E for training Enlisted Aircrew in the roles of mine countermeasures and operational procedures. It is a fairly significant "stage", looking reminiscent of a huge theme park reality ride, and a brand new building was constructed to house both it and the Squadron Training Department.

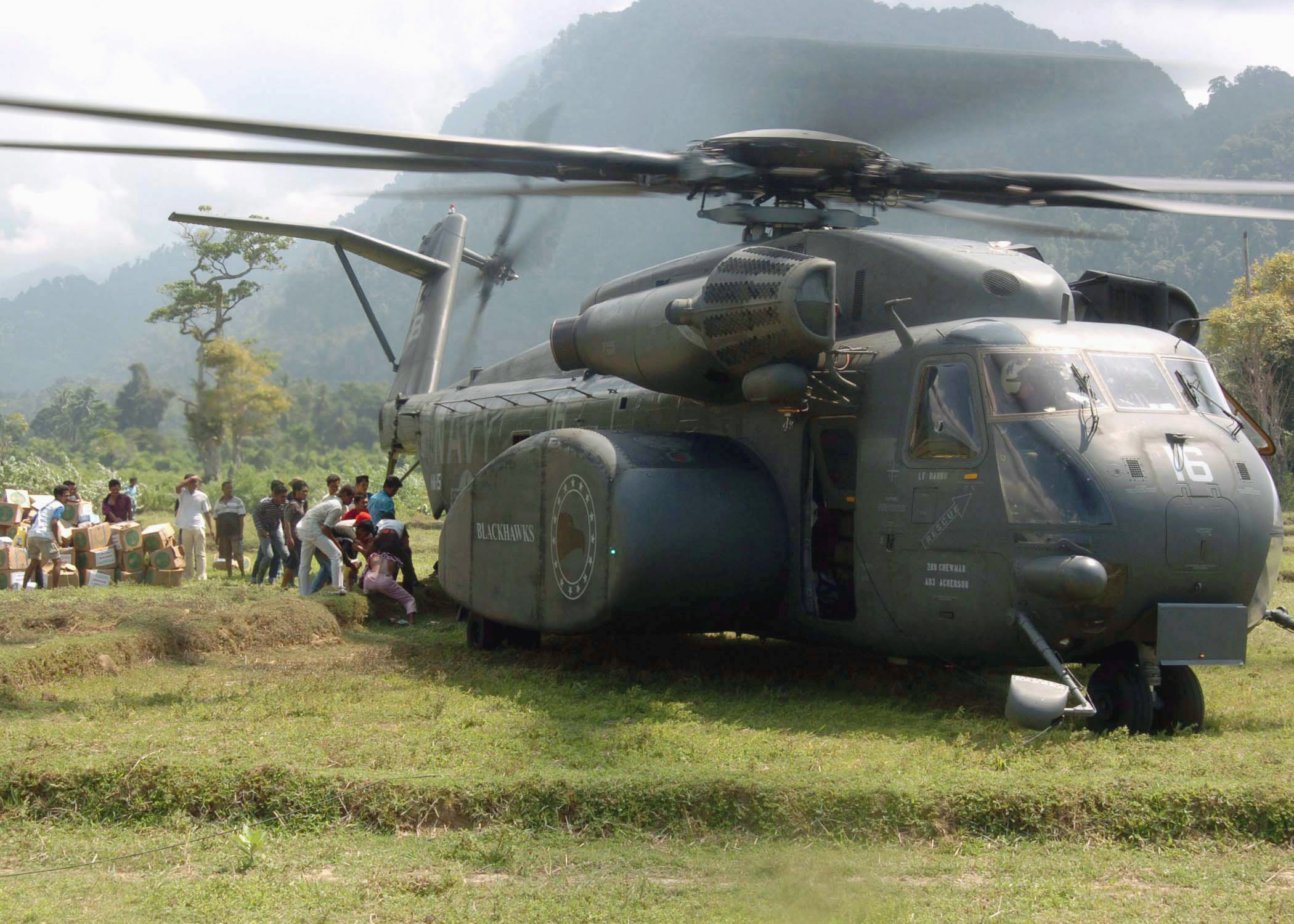
HM-15 delivers aid to Sabang on the island of Sumatra following the 2004 Indian Ocean earthquake/tsunami.

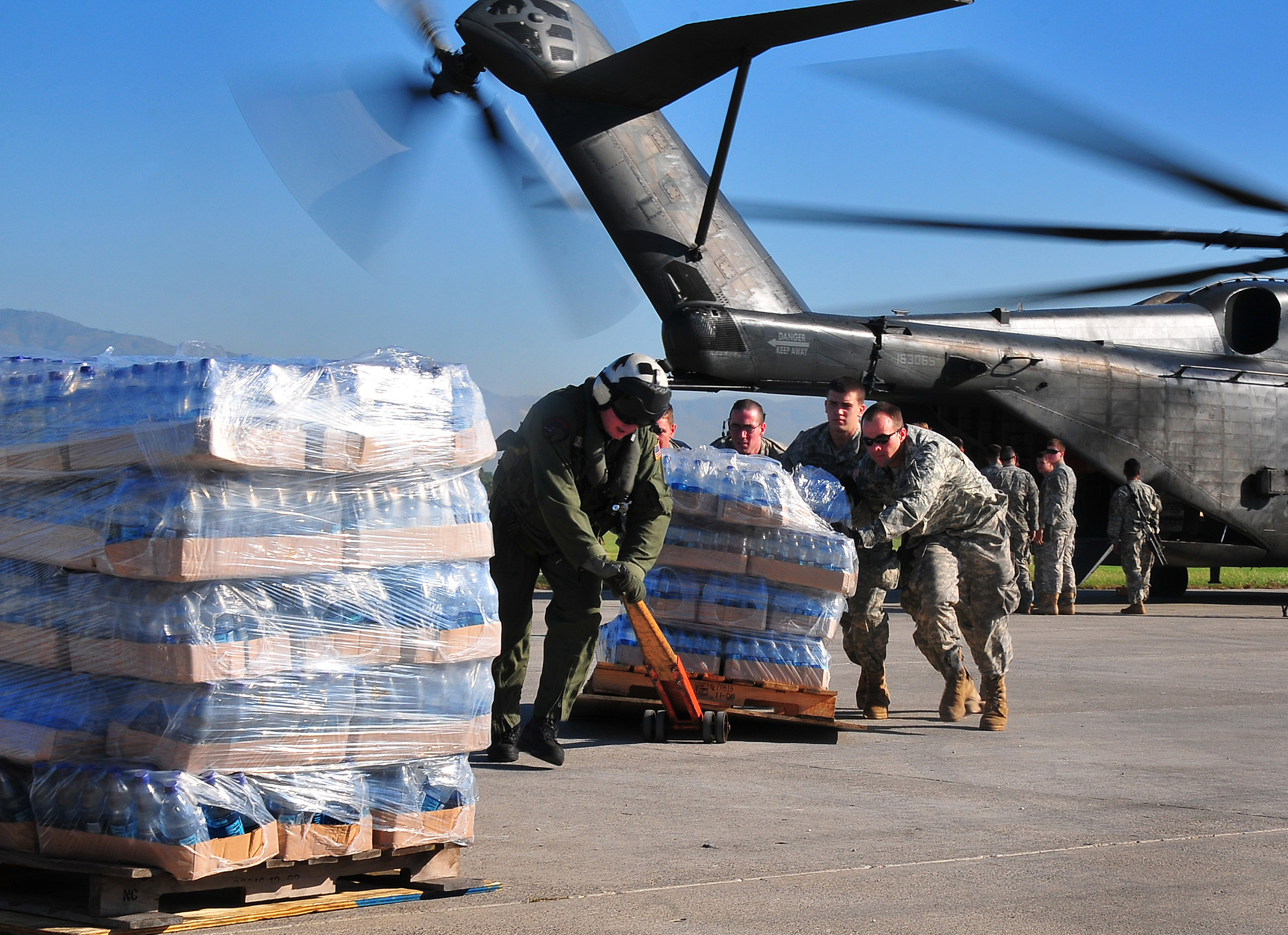
HM-15 aircraft ferry water from the offshore flotilla, 15 January in support of relief operation after the 2010 Haiti earthquake.

== See also ==
- History of the United States Navy
- List of Inactive United States Navy aircraft squadrons
- List of United States Navy aircraft squadrons
