= Fifteenth of the month =

Recurring ordinal calendar date

The fifteenth of the month or fifteenth day of the month is the recurring calendar date position corresponding to the day numbered 15 of each month. In the Gregorian calendar (and other calendars that number days sequentially within a month), this day occurs in every month of the year, and therefore occurs twelve times per year. The fifteenth of the month is typically at or near the middle of the month, the last day of the first half of the month.

- Fifteenth of January
- Fifteenth of February
- Fifteenth of March
- Fifteenth of April
- Fifteenth of May
- Fifteenth of June
- Fifteenth of July
- Fifteenth of August
- Fifteenth of September
- Fifteenth of October
- Fifteenth of November
- Fifteenth of December

In addition to these dates, this date occurs in months of many other calendars, such as the Bengali calendar and the Hebrew calendar.

== See also ==
- Fifteenth (disambiguation)
- Fifteenth Day of Av, an Israeli holiday
