= 15th Infantry Division (Belgium) =

Infantry division of the Belgian Army

- Active: 1940
- Disbanded: 28 May 1940
- Country: Belgium
- Branch: Belgian Army
- Type: Infantry Division
- Role: Infantry
- Size: Division
- Part of: IV Corps (Belgium)
- Garrison/HQ: Kessel
- Engagements: Battle of Belgium (World War II)

The 15th Infantry Division (15de Infanterie Divisie) was an infantry division of the Belgian Army that fought in the Battle of Belgium against the Wehrmacht during the Second World War.

== World War II ==
After the Phony wars, the Germans have had enough time to gather a sufficient amount of their forces near the Rhineland and smashed into Belgium and the Netherlands. The 15th Division was one of the weaker formations in the Belgian army. It was made up entirely of older reserve regiments which was armed with antiquated weapons of world war one vintage. Moreover, its regiments lacked the fourth heavy weapons battalion that was customary in the regiments of the active army and those of newer reserves.

The division was stationed behind the Albert Canal line between Herentals and Massenhoven. To compensate for its weaker units, its lines were somewhat shorter than those of its neighbouring divisions.

As the Belgian front at the Canal collapsed near Liège, the 15th Division was withdrawn from its positions and was made to occupy the lines between the Antwerp Position and the K-W Line, covered by the forts of Kessel and Massenhoven. When the Germans broke through and the K-W Line was abandoned, the 15th Division's line was lengthened as it was assigned a covering role for the retreat of the army. Only the 42nd regiment saw heavy fighting, successfully defending Lier from multiple German probes during 17 May.

The 15th Division withdrew all the way to the coast, where it was assigned a role in the rearguard. First, it was to prepare the north of Zeeuws Vlaanderen from a possible German attack across the Scheldt while the remaining troops of the French 7th Army withdrew from the region.

After the Germans reached the English Channel and the Allied forces in Flanders were effectively cut off, the 15th Division was positioned along the Yser facing West against a possible German breakthrough over the British sector. As the Lys Battle unfolded and the Germans decisively punctured the Belgian defences at the river, the units of the 15th Division were called in to serious action for the first time.

The 31st line regiment was detached from the Division on 25 may to man a makeshift line over the Roeselare-Ypres railroad. It took position between Frezenberg and Passendale, on the old World War One battlefields. By the 26th of may the regiment found itself in the front line. After several preliminary bombardments, the Germans succeeded in destroying several companies at the first attack, successfully enveloping the remainder of two of its battalions.

The 42nd line regiment was the last to remain on the Yser. As the situation at the Lys became desperate, Army Command was throwing the last remaining reserves into the fray. On the 26th of may, the regiment was hastily transported towards Tielt. As the Belgians embarked on their buses, the Luftwaffe attacked, leaving 20 dead and 75 wounded. By the time the regiment arrived in Tielt, it's morale had taken a serious beating. On 27 May, its battalions were deployed under constant Luftwaffe strafing. In the afternoon, shortly after taking position, they found themselves suddenly on the frontline. After a brief fight, they were quickly overwhelmed, either surrendering or retreating in disarray.

The 43rd line regiment followed the 31st almost immediately to the position behind the railroad. It took position near Passendale, covering the flanks of the 31st and the 4th of the line. During the night of the 26th, it was gradually reinforced by cyclists, machine and AA gun companies from different units.

As the disaster in the area of the 31st unfolded, the 2nd battalion of the 43rd quickly became involved in the fighting, too. Although it attempted to contain the breach on its right, by noon the Germans struck the town of Passendale in force. One by one its companies were defeated, losing several officers as well as its Major Phillippart. By the end of the day only 2 battalions were more or less in fighting condition, conducting a successful fighting retreat inland.

By the Belgian surrender on 28 May, at least 215 officers, NCO and enlisted were killed in action.

== Structure 1940 ==
Structure of the division at the eve of the Battle of Belgium:

- Headquarters, at Kessel
- Commanding Officer, 15th Division – Lieutenant-General Baron Raoul de Hennin de Boussu-Walcourt
  - 31st Line Regiment
  - 42nd Line Regiment
  - 43rd Line Regiment
  - 23rd Artillery Regiment (Belgium)
  - 15th Bicycle Squadron (to the 18th Division)
  - 16th Engineer Battalion
  - 15th Signal Battalion
  - 15th Divisional Supply Battalion
  - 15th Divisional Field Hospital Battalion
  - 15th Divisional Quartermaster Company
  - 15th Divisional Military Police Unit

== See also ==
- Belgian Army order of battle (1940)
- Army Group B
