= United States Army Correctional Brigade =

The United States Army Correctional Brigade is a prison which prepares prisoners for transition to civilian life as useful citizens or, in a few select cases, for return to military service. Prior to 1 October 1992, Camp Funston was the home of the brigade. The Correctional Brigade environment was unique in that prisoner control was maintained by military discipline, instead of walls and bars for most of the typical prisoners' stay. The Correctional Brigade's philosophy is that the minimum custody/military discipline environment when coupled with correctional treatment, educational programs, military and vocational training best prepared the typical first-time prisoner for a crime-free life after prison as either a productive soldier or a useful citizen in civilian life. Moreover, this correctional system was asserted to be less expensive to establish and operate than the traditional prison.
