= Fifteenth Amendment =

The Fifteenth Amendment may refer to the:

- Fifteenth Amendment to the United States Constitution, which guaranteed men the right to vote regardless of race
- Fifteenth Amendment of the Constitution of India, 1963 amendment relating to the judiciary of High Courts
- Fifteenth Amendment of the Constitution of Ireland, which allowed divorce to be legalized in Ireland
- Fifteenth Amendment to the Constitution of Pakistan, which sought to impose Sharia Law but was not passed
- Fifteenth Amendment of the Constitution of South Africa repealed some of the provisions inserted into the Constitution by the Eighth and Tenth Amendments which allowed for floor-crossing, that is, allowed members of legislative bodies to move from one political party to another without losing their seats
