= 15th Street =

15th Street may refer to:

- 15th Street station (SEPTA), an American rapid transit station in Philadelphia
- 15th Street – Prospect Park (IND Culver Line), a local station on the IND Culver Line of the New York City Subway
- Fifteenth Street, a street in Fayetteville, Arkansas carrying the state highway designation Arkansas Highway 16

== See also ==
- Fifteenth Street Financial Historic District
