= 15th Cavalry Division (Russian Empire) =

- 15-я кавалерийская дивизия
- Active: 1914–1918
- Country: Russian Empire
- Branch: Russian Imperial Army
- Role: Cavalry
- Engagements: World War I; Battle of Tannenberg

The 15th Cavalry Division (Russian: 15-я кавалерийская дивизия, 15-ya Kavaleriiskaya Diviziya) was a cavalry formation of the Russian Imperial Army.

== Organization ==
- 1st Cavalry Brigade
  - 15th Regiment of Dragoons
  - 15th Uhlan Regiment
- 2nd Cavalry Brigade
  - 15th Regiment of Hussars
  - 15th Regiment of Cossacks
- 15th Horse Artillery Division

== Commanders ==
- 1891–1897: Alexander Kaulbars
- 1897–1899: Georgii Stackelberg
