= 15 Squadron =

15 Squadron or 15th Squadron may refer to:

== Aviation squadrons ==
- No. 15 Squadron PAF, a unit of the Pakistan Air Force
- No. 15 Squadron RAAF, a unit of the Royal Australian Air Force
- No. 15 Squadron RAF, a unit of the United Kingdom Royal Air Force
- No. 15 Squadron RNZAF, a unit of the Royal New Zealand Air Force
- 15 Squadron SAAF, a unit of the South African Air Force
- 15th Airlift Squadron, a unit of the United States Air Force
- 15th Air Squadron, a unit in the 32nd Air Wing, Indonesian Air Force
- 15th Antisubmarine Squadron, a former unit of the United States Army Air Forces, most recently the 15th Special Operations Squadron
- 15th Bombardment Squadron (Light), a unit of the United States Army Air Forces
- 15th Bombardment Squadron, Very Heavy, a former unit of the United States Army Air Forces, most recently the 915th Air Refueling Squadron
- 15th Fighter Squadron, a former unit of the United States Air Force, most recently the 15th Test Squadron
- 15th Military Airlift Squadron, a former unit of the United States Air Force, most recently the 15th Airlift Squadron
- 15th Photographic Reconnaissance Squadron, a former unit of the United States Army Air Forces, most recently the 556th Test and Evaluation Squadron
- 15th Reconnaissance Squadron, a unit of the United States Air Force
- 15th Reconnaissance Squadron, Medium a former unit of the United States Army Air Forces, most recently the 405th Tactical Missile Squadron
- 15th Special Operations Squadron, a unit of the United States Air Force
- 15th Tactical Reconnaissance Squadron, a former unit of the United States Air Force, most recently the 15th Reconnaissance Squadron
- 15th Test Squadron, a unit of the United States Air Force
- 15th Troop Carrier Squadron, a former unit of the United States Air Force, most recently the 15th Airlift Squadron
- VFA-15 (Strike Fighter Squadron 15), a unit of the United States Navy
- HM-15 (Helicopter Mine Countermeasures Squadron 15), a unit of the United States Navy

== Ground combat squadrons ==
- 15 Air Assault Support Squadron RLC, a unit of the United Kingdom Army
- No. 15 Squadron RAF Regiment, a unit of the United Kingdom Royal Air Force
