= Lucien Jottrand =

Walloon-Belgian lawyer and politician

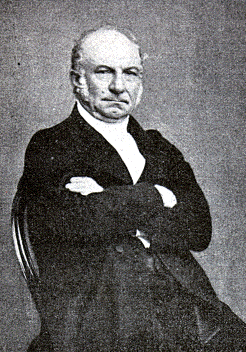
- Lucien Jottrand
- Born: 31 January 1804; Genappe, French First Republic (present-day Belgium)
- Died: 17 December 1877 (aged 73); Saint-Josse-ten-Noode, Belgium
- Education: University of Liège (PhD, 1825)
- Occupations: Lawyer, politician, writer, journalist
- Organization: Association Démocratique
- Movement: Flemish Movement; Pan-Netherlandism
- Relatives: Gustave Jottrand (son)

Lucien Leopold Joseph Jottrand (Genappe, 31 January 1804 – Saint-Josse-ten-Noode, 17 December 1877) was a Walloon-Belgian lawyer, politician, progressive flamingant and Pan-Netherlander. He was a member of the National Congress of Belgium shortly after the de facto independence of Belgium and held a unique position in the young Flemish Movement.

== Early life ==
Jottrand was born in Genappe, present-day Belgium (then under the French First Republic). He completed his secondary education in Dutch in Vilvoorde and obtained his doctorate in law at the University of Liège in 1825, where he was influenced by the Dutch professor Johannes Kinker, among others. He became a lawyer in Brussels, where he also pleaded in Dutch.

Initially, Jottrand was loyal to the United Kingdom of the Netherlands, but gradually became more critical due to the authoritarian rule of William I. From 1826 he was editor of the opposition newspaper Courrier des Pays-Bas, of which he became owner and editor-in-chief in 1832 and renamed it Courrier Belge. During the Belgian Revolution in 1830, Jottrand, together with Edouard Ducpétiaux, designed the later Belgian flag to replace the French tricolor used by French-minded revolutionaries. He was a member of the Société des Douze.

At the end of October 1830 he became a member of the National Congress. He had only been elected as the fifth successor, but because of the early rejection of an effective elector and four successors, he entered Congress as early as November 15. With his 125 interventions, he was the third most active participant in the public session debates. At his insistence, language freedom was added to the constitution, making it possible to break the monopoly of French.

Jottrand endorsed the Declaration of Independence and voted for the perpetual exclusion of the House of Orange-Nassau. During the first rounds of voting for a head of state, he gave his vote to Auguste, Duke of Leuchtenberg and later that month to Surlet de Chokier as regent. He was one of 45 Congressmen who did not vote for Leopold of Saxe Coburg. He also voted against the acceptance of the Treaty of the Eighteen Articles, which finalized the Belgo-Dutch border.

After the dissolution of the National Congress in July 1831, Jottrand turned down a further parliamentary career. He believed that he could fight more consistently for his political and social ideas outside parliament.

== Flamingant ==
Jottrand was a big supporter of the Dutch language group Nederduitsch Tael- en Letterkundig Genootschap. He supplied half of the starting capital for the Flemish newspaper Vlaemsch België in 1844, which he also ended up writing articles for. In 1847 he founded the daily newspaper Débat Social. He corresponded with Karl Marx, whose contributions to the Neue Rheinische Zeitung charmed him. He joined the social liberal theater group De Morgenstar in 1850 and he supported Jacob Kats in the pursuit of Dutch-language theater in the capital.

Between 1855 and 1861 he was a member of the Municipal Council of Saint-Josse-ten-Noode. In 1856 he became the first chairman of the Flemish Grievance Commission, which was founded in that year by King Leopold I. However, the long list of complaints drawn up by the committee was rejected by Prime Minister Charles Rogier in 1857.

Jottrand was a member of various pro-Flemish pressure groups: from 1858 onwards he was a member of Vlamingen Vooruit and in 1861. He joined the Central Bureau of Vlaemsch Verbond. In 1872 he called for a unified Flemish electoral list to be submitted for the parliamentary elections. The following year, partly due to his efforts, a Flemish "country day" was held in Brussels with at least ten thousand people present. The first Belgian language law, the so-called Equality Law or Coremans Law, was also created under his influence.

His son Gustave Jottrand was also a pro-Flemish politician. He was member of the Municipal Council of the city of Brussels from 1870 to 1884 and a member of the Chamber of Representatives from 1870 to 1884.

== Political positions ==
Jottrand evolved from a Belgian patriot to a progressive democratic flamingant. He described himself as a "Dutch-Walloon" and held a unique place within the Flemish Movement due to his proposal of a federal Dutch realm that would also encompass Wallonia and Luxembourg. This makes him a precursor to the so-called Burgundist ideal of Joris van Severen. Jottrand forms a link in the evolution of the Flemish Movement from a cultural to a political movement. For him, "Netherlandic" was a political concept rather than a linguistic or ethnic concept. Decentralization and equality of the various population groups were of great importance in this respect. Jottrand was a progressive liberal and was in contact with representatives of early socialism. He was chairman of the Belgian Association Démocratique of which Karl Marx was vice-chairman. He was also a republican and advocate for universal suffrage.

== Association Démocratique ==
The Association Démocratique or 'Association Démocratique, ayant pour but l'union et la fraternité de tous les peuples' (English: Democratic Association, with the goal of union and brotherhood of all peoples) in full, was a democratic and republican political organisation in Belgium. For some time it had its own journal, the Deutsche Brüsseler Zeitung.

The group was created in 27 September 1847 in Brussels. Lucien Jottrand along with Karel Spilthoorn belonged to its founding members. Many immigrants joined the organisation like Poles and Germans. The group often met up in café De Zwaan, Brussels. The aim of the movement was to unite all democratic forces in Belgium. Chairman of the organisation was Jottrand, vice-chairman was Karl Marx. Spilthoorn drew up the constitution of the association. In January 1848 a chapter was founded in Ghent, with Spilthoorn as chairman.

Jottrand wanted to achieve social change through civil resistance and stayed away from labour revolts. As a radical liberal, he primarily opposed the role of the nobility in Belgian politics and the royal family. In contrast to the proletarian wing, including Friedrich Engels and Karl Marx, his aim was to lift the working class out of their poverty rather than liberate them from class struggle and create a different society. This contradiction briefly led to a split between the two and Marx even canceled his membership of the association. However, the build-up to the revolutions of 1848 brought them back together. Spilthoorn, as a representative of the Association Démocratique, was sent to Paris to meet with the Provisional Government during the February Revolution.

The association was blamed by the Belgian authorities for the attempt to overthrow the Belgian monarchy in 1848. Several members were convicted at the Court of Assizes in Antwerp, including honorary president François Mellinet. 17 members were sentenced to death on August 30, 1848 for conspiracy against the state after which the Association Démocratique fell apart.

== Works ==
- Beschrijving van de Betoging en het Banket van den 25 April 1859 ter eere der Vlaemsche taelcommissie (1859)
- La question Flamande (1865)
- Nederduitsche gewrochten van den Nederlandschen Waal (1872)
- Over het toneel en zijn strekking en nut in België (1852)
- Lettres unionistes sur la réforme électorale en Belgique (1869)
- Notre frontière du Nord-Ouest: Excursions pendant les Vacances (1843)

== Literature ==
- Félix DELHASSE, Ecrivains et hommes politiques de la Belgique, Brussel, 1857, pp. 153–176.
- Louis BERTRAND, Histoire de la démocratie et du socialisme en Belgique depuis 1830, t. I, Brussel, 1907.
- J. KUYPERS, Lucien Jottrand, in: Biographie nationale de Belgique, t. XXX, 1958–1959, col. 471-488
- Marc D'HOKER & Sam VAN CLEMEN, Lucien Jottrand, in: Nieuwe Encyclopedie van de Vlaamse Beweging, Tielt, 1998, blz. 1597.
