= Jef François =

Belgian politician

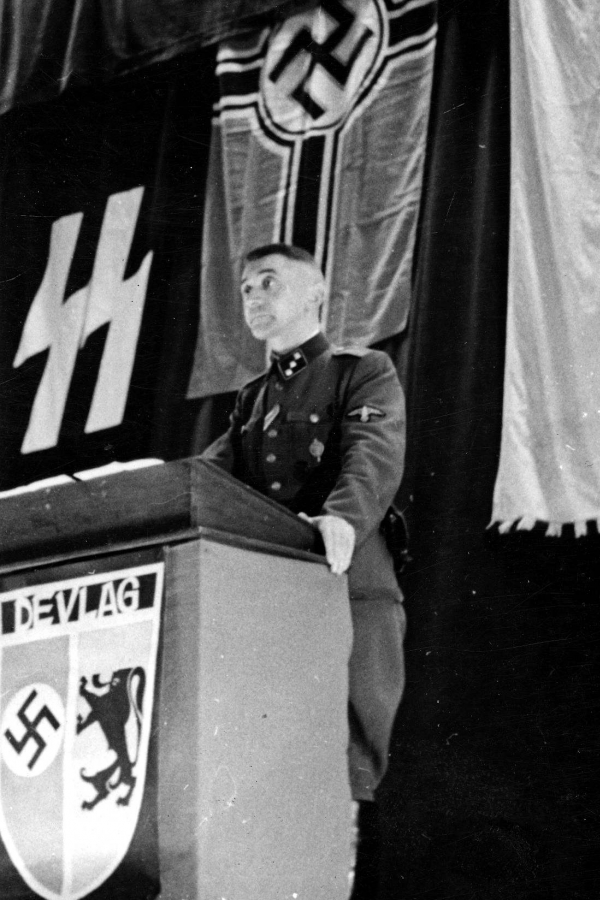
- Born: Josephus Alphonsus Marie François; 22 May 1901
- Died: 1996 (aged 94–95)
- Occupation: Politician

Josephus Alphonsus Marie François (22 May 1901 – 1996) was a Belgian Flemish far right politician and Nazi collaborator.

== Political career ==
A native of Ghent, he first came to politics as a member of the Frontpartij, along with the likes of Ward Hermans and Joris Van Severen. In 1931 he joined the likes of Van Severen and Wies Moens in launching Verdinaso (The Verdinaso (Verbond der Dietse Nationaal-Solidaristen – Union of Diets National Solidarists) was an authoritarian and fascist-inspired political party in Belgium and the Netherlands during the 1930s), and was installed as deputy leader of the group the following year and head of the militia in 1937. François succeeded Van Severen as leader of Verdinaso after Van Severen's murder in the 1940 massacre in Abbeville, taking the movement in a new, pro-Nazi Germany direction and merging them into the Flemish National Union. He commanded the militia group, Dietsche Militie, of this combined organisation.

François enrolled in the Schutzstaffel (SS), in August 1941 and for a time he was the leader of the Flemish SS. Seeing action on the Eastern Front, he rose to the rank of Obersturmführer (First Lieutenant) in the 27th SS Volunteer Division Langemarck. After the war he was sentenced to death, but the sentence was commuted to life imprisonment, and he was released in 1952. After the war he organised an SS veterans group and was involved on the fringes of the Vlaamse Militanten Orde (a Flemish nationalist activist group in Belgium defending far-right interests by propaganda and political action).
