= Abbeville massacre =

Massacre of suspected collaborationists by the French Army during World War II

- Part of the Battle of France
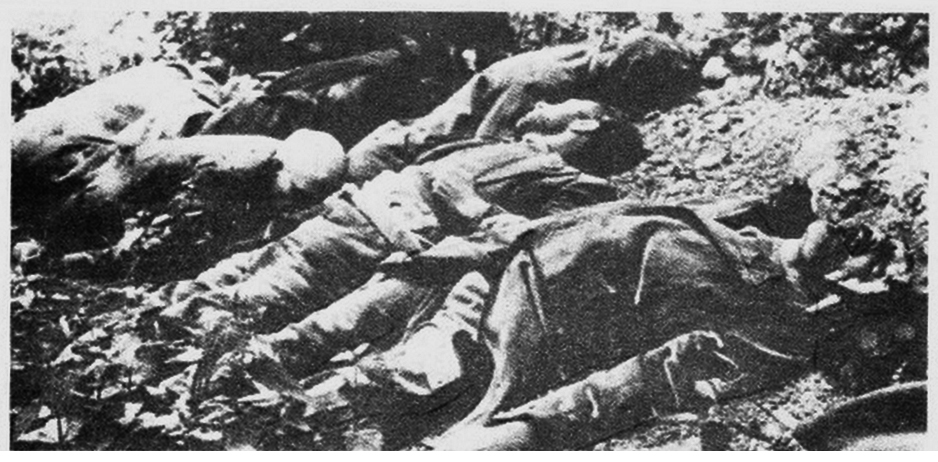
- The bodies of Rijckoort, Van Severen, Monami, Wéry, and two Italians
- Location: Abbeville, Somme, France
- Date: 20 May 1940
- Attack type: Summary executions
- Deaths: 21
- Victim: Civilians suspected of colluding with Nazi Germany
- Perpetrator: French Army: Marcel Dingeon
- Motive: Purging suspected fifth columnists and potential collaborators before they could be freed by the Germans
- Convicted: René Caron; Émile Molet

The Abbeville massacre took place during the Battle of France in the French town of Abbeville on 20 May 1940, when 21 political prisoners, mainly foreign nationals, were killed by the French soldiers who feared that they might become possible fifth columnists or collaborators with Nazi Germany.

Although four of those killed were actively working for the Nazis, with another two having genuine Nazi affiliations, the victims also included a number of individuals hostile to Nazism. These included fascists hostile to Nazism such as Joris Van Severen, the cofounder of Verdinaso. Several Jews and Communists were also killed.

== Background ==
During the German invasion of Belgium, the Belgian authorities arrested a number of suspects ("enemy Belgians and enemy foreigners") between 10 and 15 May on the orders of the auditor general Walter Ganshof van der Meersch. "It is clear that the arrests were very irresponsible and arbitrary. They just picked up some people: out of revenge, out of jealousy, because of their political beliefs, their Jewish origin or because of their foreign nationality," wrote survivor Gaby Warris. These administrative internees were imprisoned in 't Pandreitje , the former prison of Bruges. Among them were Joris Van Severen, Léon Degrelle and other notables. Despite unsuccessful attempts by befriended members of parliament to free Van Severen (as they had VNV leader Staf Declercq), he was deported to France on 15 May 1940 with Degrelle and 77 others.

Unlike the other suspects who were taken away in so-called "ghost trains", this mixed group (handcuffed in pairs) was driven in three buses via Ostend to Dunkirk, where Degrelle was removed from the group. In the study Dossier Abbeville, the backgrounds of all 'suspicious' persons were extensively discussed. The 21 Belgians also included the Rexist René Wéry, Verdinaso member Jan Rijckoort (the right-hand man of Van Severen) and VNV member Maurits Van Gijsegem. The group also included 18 Jews, 14 German citizens, four Italians (Ferrucio Bellumat, Luigi Lazarelli, Guiseppe Mantella, and Mirko Taccardi), two Dutchmen (Willem van de Loo and Johannes van der Plas), Canadian ice hockey coach Bobby Bell, and a number of Belgian communists (Louis Caestecker and Lucien Monami, among others).

== Massacre ==
Three days later, on 19 May, the entire group was taken to Abbeville and locked up under the music kiosk on the market square. When the city of Abbeville was heavily bombed from the air by German squadrons on the night of 19–20 May, the French guards thought that the prisoners would be liberated by the Germans. They decided in the afternoon of 20 May that it was better to execute them. Twenty-one prisoners were taken from the kiosk, placed against the wall, and shot without trial on the orders of the French Capitaine Marcel Dingeon, who was Abbeville's deputy commander. A woman, Maria Geerolf-Ceuterick, was bayoneted to death. She had been mistakenly arrested instead of her son-in-law, the Dutch architect Ernst Warris, who lived in Bruges. The executions ended on orders of Lieutenant Jean Léclabart, who finally arrived and was able to stop the massacre. Among the 21 victims were citizens of six different countries besides Belgium, including Italy, Czechoslovakia (Léon Hirschfeld, a Jewish schizophrenic) and Hungary (Miguel Sonin-Garfunkel, an elderly Spanish Jew).

Of those killed, only six had pro-Nazi affiliations, of whom four were working for the Germans. German Paul Günther was an Abwehr recruiter, while Belgians Jean-Henri De Bruyn and Hector Vanderkelen and Dutchman Willem van de Loo were working for the Abwehr. Another Belgian, René Wéry, was a member of the Rexist Party, a group which later extensively collaborated with the Germans. Belgian Maurits Van Gijsegem was a member of the Vlaamsch Nationaal Verbond, a group that also heavily collaborated. Two others, Joris Van Severen, a cofounder of Verdinaso, and his subordinate, Jan Ryckoort, were fascists without pro-Nazi affiliations. Verdinaso, which had more far-right conservative leanings than the Rexists, did not share the racist ideology of the Nazi regime, with Van Severen having said "I detest the Hitlerians," in a previous interview.

== Aftermath ==
In January 1942, Lieutenant René Caron and Sergeant Émile Molet were put on trial before the German court-martial in wartime Paris. They were sentenced to death and executed by firing squad on 7 April 1942 at Mont-Valérien. Captain Marcel Dingeon had escaped to the zone libre, where he had committed suicide in Pau on 21 January 1941.

Following Joris van Severen's death, Verdinaso fell apart. Some activists collaborated with the Nazis, while others joined the resistance.

== See also ==
- Allied war crimes during World War II
- Belgium in World War II
- France during World War II
