= Pan-Netherlands =

Irredentist concept which aims to unite the Netherlands, Belgium and Luxembourg

Map of the Low Countries. In the main variant, Pan-Netherlands entails a union of these three countries.

Pan-Netherlands (Dutch: Heel-Nederland), sometimes translated as Whole-Netherlands, is an irredentist concept which aims to unite the Low Countries (Netherlands, Belgium, and Luxembourg) into a single state. It is an example of Pan-Nationalism.

Some variants do not include Luxembourg. In less common variants, the French Netherlands (Nord-Pas-de-Calais) are also involved in the merger as well as some border territories in Germany (e.g. East Friesland). Some Pan-Netherlandic groups also want to include South Africa due to the relation of the Dutch to the Afrikaners and the Afrikaans language.

The goal is to unite these territories into one multilingual state (unitary, federal or confederal). This differs from Greater Netherlandism which aims to unite all Dutch-speaking areas. The name of this state differs per organization, some commonly used names are the (united/reunited) Netherlands/Low Countries.

== Terminology ==
The ideology is often labeled as Pan-Netherlandism (Heel-Nederlandisme) or Pan-Netherlands thought (Heel-Nederlandse gedachte). The terms Burgundism (Bourgondicisme) or Burgundian Thought (Bourgondische Gedachte) are also used, referring to the Burgundian Circle in the 16th century which united the Low Countries.

In the 20th century a movement grew that merely strives for far-reaching cooperation of the existing Benelux countries. This is often referred to as the "Benelux ideal" (Beneluxgedachte), which led to the creation of the similarly named Benelux Union.

In Belgium, both Pan-Netherlandism, as well as Greater Netherlandism are sometimes labeled as "Orangism" but this can be confusing due to the fact that in all Benelux states this term can also refer to the movement that strives for a restoration of power of the Royal House of Orange-Nassau in their region.

== History ==
After the disintegration of Middle Francia and Lotharingia in the late 10th century, the Low Countries largely existed within a single polity, as the Duchy of Lower Lotharingia. Starting in 1384, the region was united in the form of a personal union under the Duchy of Burgundy as the Burgundian Netherlands. In 1482, the region came under the control of Spain as the Habsburg Netherlands, also referred to as the Seventeen Provinces after the centralisation of the polities through the Burgundian Circle. This history of relative unity in the Low Countries region ended with the Dutch Revolt.

=== Post-Dutch revolt ===
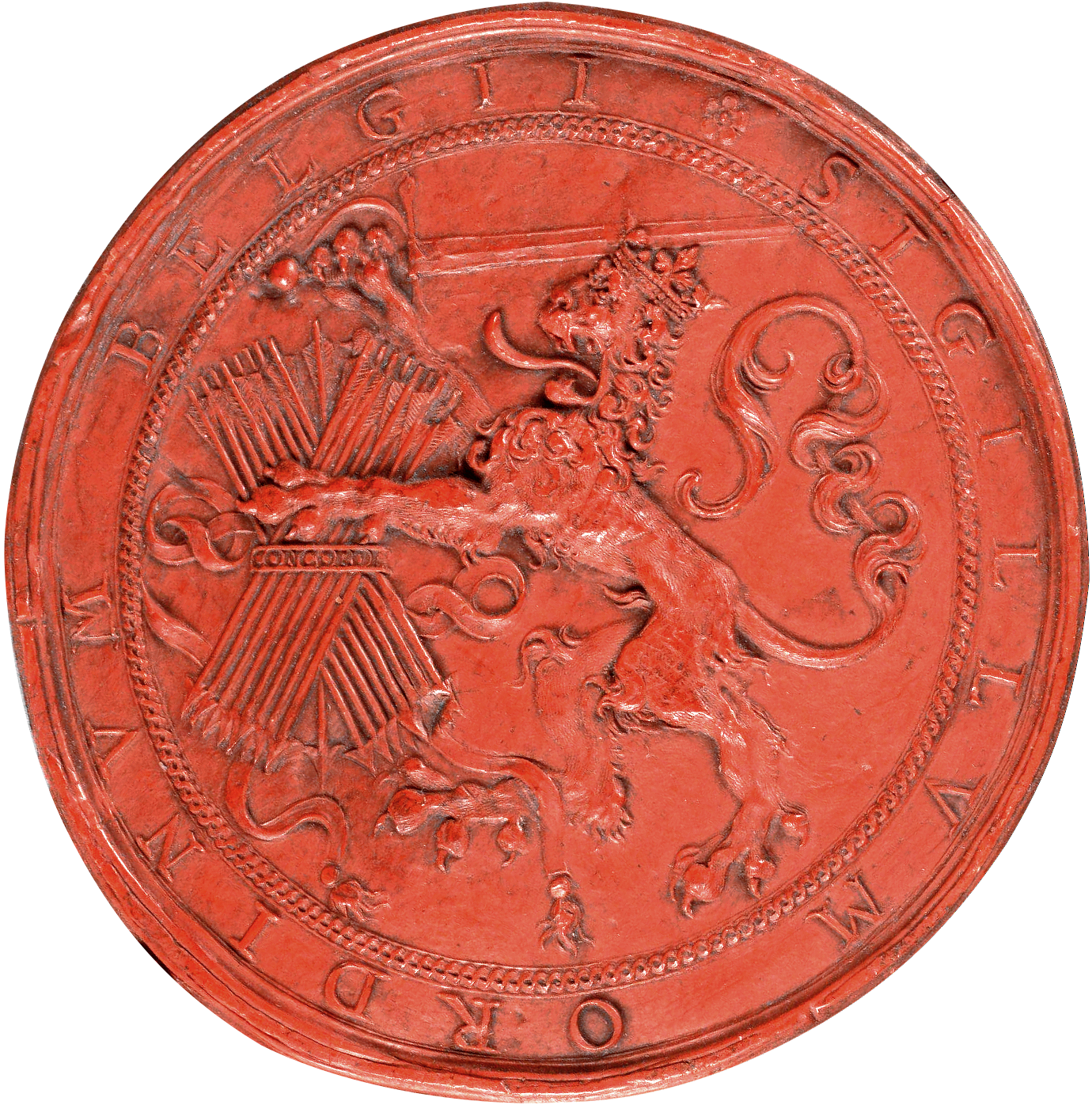
17th century seal of the States-General of the Netherlands. Seventeen arrows to represent all Seventeen Provinces

At the beginning of the Eighty Years' War the Netherlandic rebels sought to liberate all regions (see Union of Brussels) but were unsuccessful. This ideal to "free" additional parts of the Low Countries was prominent in the region until the late 17th century. In 1790, the prime minister of the short-lived United Belgian States (which roughly encompassed present-day Belgium) Henri van der Noot proposed to reunite with the Dutch. Partly because of this, the Low Countries were united by William I as the United Kingdom of the Netherlands, which in fact encompasses the territory that the Pan-Netherlands movement strives for. Additionally, King William even claimed the Rhineland for some time. This united kingdom ended in 1830, with the Belgian Revolution, but left behind an Orangist movement, which sought re-attachment to the north. The movement organized local committees and enjoyed limited success at the municipal level. In the 1860s, another union proposal was made from the Belgian side by the then Prime Minister, this time for a confederation, but this was rejected.

During the early days of the Belgian state, the progressive and Flemish-minded Belgian-Walloon Lucien Jottrand as well as early Socialist, Cesar De Paepe put forward the idea. In 1857, Belgium had Pan-Netherlandic organisations, such as the progressive liberal Vlamingen Vooruit, which eldmembers who proposed a Belgo-Dutch federation. The ideal also held an important role in early Socialism in the Benelux region and its Proletarian Internationalism. Before the First World War and during the interwar period, Belgium in particular also had a number of less relevant Pan-Netherlandic groups such as the Verbond der Lage Landen. Between 1934 and 1940, Joris van Severen's Fascist Verdinaso was the biggest propagandist of the Pan-Netherlands ideal. (Right-wing) Pan-Netherlandic circles often represent themselves with the Prince's Flag or the Burgundian Cross.

== Post-WW2 ==
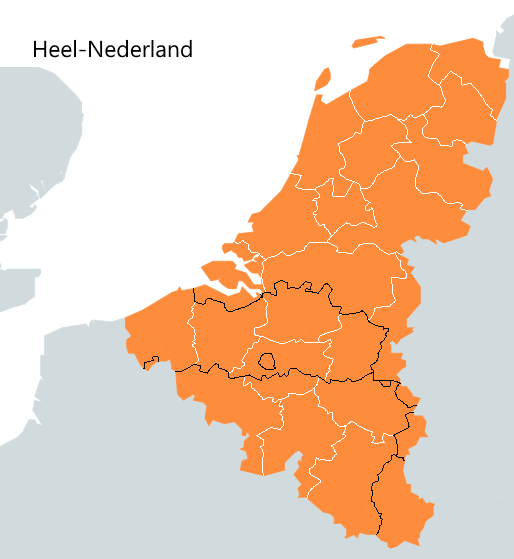
Pan-Netherlands with borders of contemporary (federated) states and provinces.

After the Second World War, Pan-Netherlands became somewhat of a taboo subject due to its connection to fascism. Nonetheless, Pan-Netherlandic historians held an important position in the creation of the Benelux Economic Union. Pieter Geyl, former advocate for Flemish-Dutch unification, became a Pan-Netherlandic historian and collaborated with several other Pan-Netherlandic historians on books describing one united history of the Low Countries (e.g. Nederlandsche Historiebladen and Algemene Geschiedenis der Nederlanden).

Examples of contemporary Pan-Netherlandic organisations are the; Algemeen-Nederlands Verbond, Baarle Werkgroep, Werkgemeenschap de Lage Landen, Zannekin, Knooppunt Delta and Die Roepstem.

While no major political party supports the idea, several individual politicians do. Academic and member of Belgian party N-VA Matthias Storme argued for a Pan-Netherlands in 2010 in his "Plan-N", saying "Even for Wallonia, it would not be a bad idea to reflect about the possibility to join the Confederation, equally as a separate country.". Karel Anthonissen (ex-chairman of the Belgian Greens) also supports this plan, perhaps including Luxembourg.

Some more moderate groups and individuals argue for further integration of the Benelux Union, which could possibly also lead to a Pan-Netherlandic polity, often as a precursor to European integration, a kind of "Benelux federalism". On February 25, 2013, during the Provincial Reorganization talks of the Rutte II cabinet, such a proposal was made by one Mr. Stevense to the States of South Holland. This was also discussed later at the councils meeting.
