= German occupation of Belgium during World War II =

Occupation of Belgium during World War II

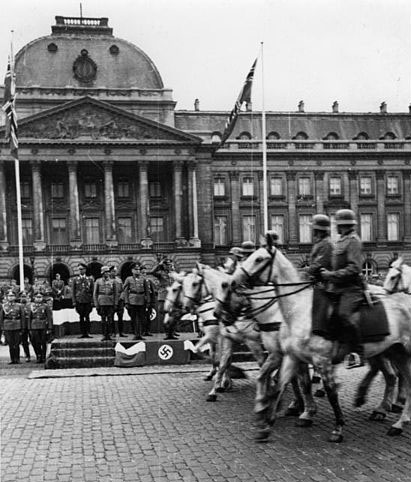
German cavalry parade past the Royal Palace in Brussels shortly after the invasion, May 1940

During World War II, Germany occupied Belgium from 28 May 1940, when the Belgian army surrendered to German forces, until Belgium's liberation by the Western Allies between September 1944 and February 1945. It was the second time in less than thirty years that Germany had occupied Belgium.

After the success of the invasion, a military administration was established in Belgium, bringing the territory under the direct rule of the Wehrmacht. Thousands of Belgian soldiers were taken as prisoners of war, and many were not released until 1945. The German administration juggled competing objectives of maintaining order while extracting material from the territory for the war effort. They were assisted by the Belgian civil service, which believed that limited co-operation with the occupiers would result in the least damage to Belgian interests. Belgian Fascist parties in both Flanders and Wallonia, established before the war, collaborated much more actively with the occupiers: they helped recruit Belgians for the German army and were given more power themselves toward the end of the occupation. Food and fuel were tightly rationed, and all official news was closely censored. Belgian civilians living near possible targets such as railway junctions were in danger of Allied aerial bombing.

From 1942, the occupation became more repressive. Jews suffered systematic persecution and deportation to concentration camps. Despite vigorous protest, the Germans deported Belgian civilians to work in factories in Germany. Meanwhile, the Belgian Resistance, formed in late 1940, expanded vastly. From 1944, the SS and Nazi Party gained much greater control in Belgium, particularly after the military government was replaced in July by a Nazi civil administration, the Reichskommissariat Belgien-Nordfrankreich. In September 1944, Allied forces arrived in Belgium and quickly moved across the country. That December, the territory was incorporated de jure into the Greater German Reich although its collaborationist leaders were already in exile in Germany and German control in the region was virtually non-existent. Belgium was declared fully liberated in February 1945. In total, 40,690 Belgians, over half of them Jews, were killed during the occupation, and the country's pre-war gross domestic product (GDP) was reduced by eight percent.

== Background ==
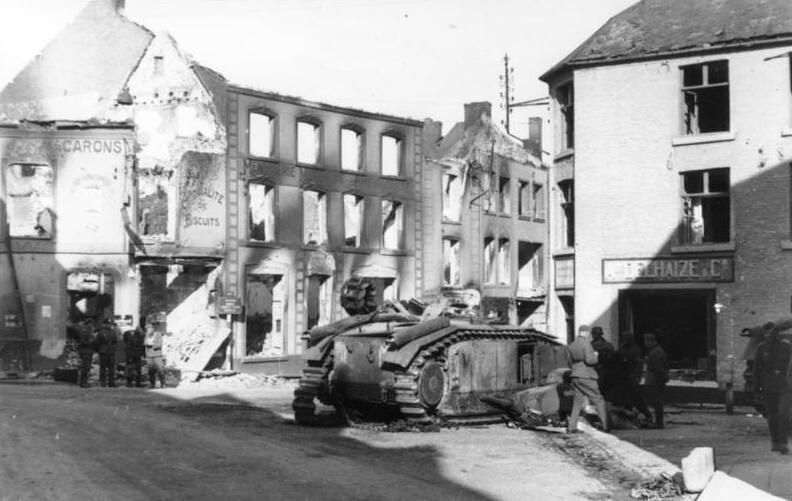
War damage in the Walloon town of Beaumont incurred during the fighting in May 1940

Belgium had pursued a policy of neutrality since its independence in 1830, successfully avoiding becoming a belligerent in the Franco-Prussian War (1870–71). In World War I, the German Empire invaded Belgium. During the ensuing occupation, the Allies encouraged Belgian workers to resist the occupiers through non-compliance, leading to large-scale reprisals against Belgian civilians by the German army.

As political tensions escalated in the years leading to World War II, the Belgian government again announced its intention to remain neutral in the event of war in Europe. The military was reorganised into a defensive force and the country left several international military treaties it had joined in the aftermath of World War I. Construction began of defences in the east of the country. When France and Britain declared war on Germany in September 1939, Belgium remained strictly neutral while mobilising its reserves.

The Belgian military was already on high alert in 1940. In fact, the Belgian Army actually obtained a copy of the German attack plans in early 1940 when a Messerschmitt Bf 108 Taifun carrying secret plans for the invasion of Western Europe (Fall Gelb) was forced to land in Vucht on January 10, 1940.

During the Battle of Belgium, the Belgian army was pushed back into a pocket in the northwest of Belgium and surrendered on 28 May. The government fled to France, and later the United Kingdom, establishing an official government in exile under pre-war Prime Minister Hubert Pierlot. They were responsible for forming a small military force made up of Belgian and colonial troops, known as the Free Belgian Forces and which fought as part of the Allied forces.

== Administration and governance ==
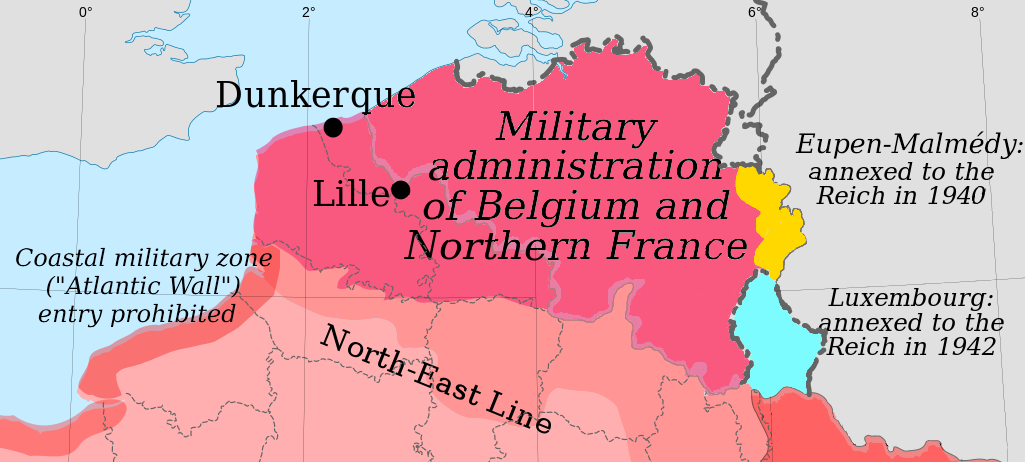
Territory of the military administration established in 1940. It included the two French departments of Nord and Pas-de-Calais and all of Belgium except Eupen-Malmédy.

Shortly after the surrender of the Belgian army, the Militärverwaltung in Belgien und Nordfrankreich (a "Military Administration" covering Belgium and the two French departments of Nord and Pas-de-Calais) (Note: The Nord-Pas-de-Calais region (with a population of around three million) fell under the jurisdiction of the Lille Oberfeldkommandantur and therefore under the Brussels-based Militärverwaltung. While the entire region remained de jure part of Vichy France, all French laws had to be approved by the Germans before implementation. French government structures were preserved intact. Its border with the rest of France, along the Somme river, was sealed off to all without official approval. The unification of historical French Flanders with Belgium may have been part of an ideological attempt to reunite the historical County of Flanders.) was created by the Germans with Brussels as administrative centre. Germany annexed Eupen-Malmedy, a German-speaking region that Belgium had seized after the Treaty of Versailles of 1919. The Military Government was placed under the control of General Alexander von Falkenhausen, an aristocrat and career soldier. Under von Falkenhausen's command, the German administration had two military units at its disposal: the Feldgendarmerie ("Field Gendarmerie", part of the Wehrmacht) and the Gestapo (the "Secret State Police", part of the SS). The section of the Military Government that dealt with civil matters, the Militärverwaltungsstab, commanded by Eggert Reeder, was responsible for all economic, social and political matters in the territory.

Before leaving the country in 1940, the Belgian government had installed a panel of senior civil-servants, the so-called "Committee of Secretaries-General", to administer the territory in the absence of elected ministers. The Germans retained the committee during the occupation; it was responsible for implementing demands made by the Militärverwaltungsstab. The Committee hoped to stop the Germans from becoming involved in the day-to-day administration of the territory, allowing the nation to maintain a degree of autonomy. The committee also hoped to be able to prevent the implementation of more radical German policies, such as forced labour and deportation. In practice, the Committee merely enabled the Germans to implement their policies more efficiently than the Military Government could have done by force.

In July 1944, the military administration was replaced by a civilian government (Zivilverwaltung), led by Josef Grohé. The territory was divided into Reichsgaue, considerably increasing the power of the Nazi Party and SS in the territory. By 1944 the Germans were increasingly forced to share power, and day-to-day administration was increasingly delegated to Belgian civil authorities and organisations.

=== Leopold III ===
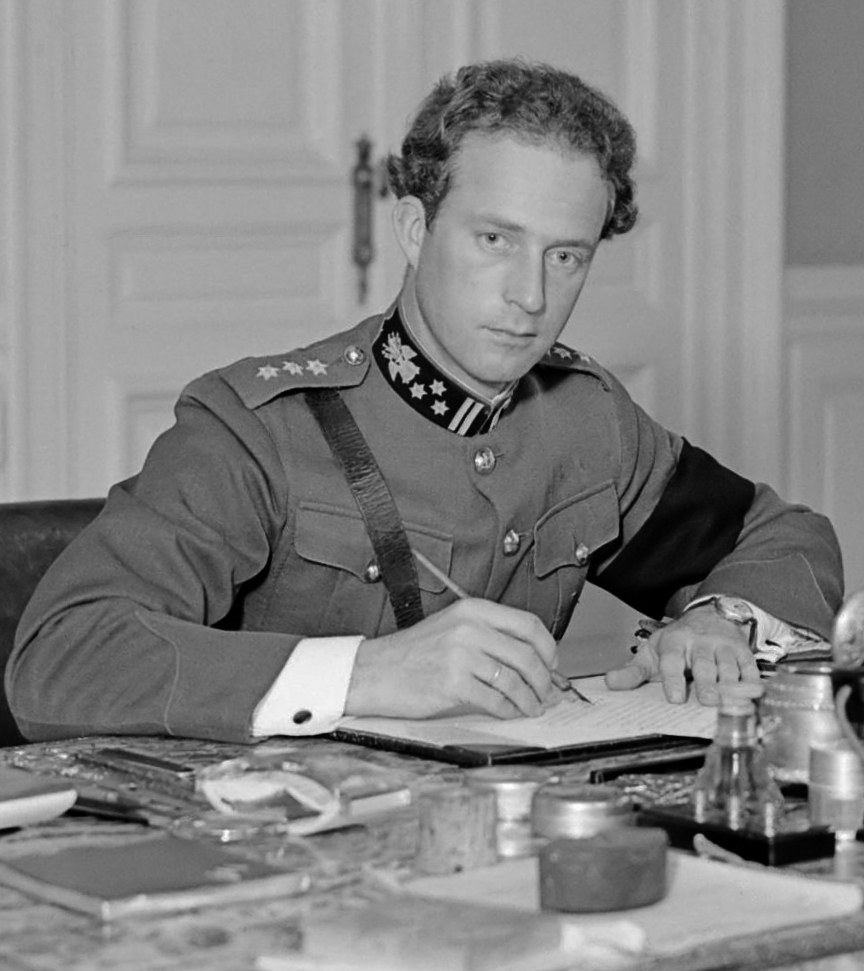
Leopold in 1934 after his accession to the throne

Leopold III became King of the Belgians in 1934, following the death of his father Albert I in a mountaineering accident. Leopold was one of the key exponents of Belgian political and military neutrality before the war. Under the Belgian Constitution, Leopold played an important political role, served as commander-in-chief of the military, and personally commanded the Belgian army in May 1940.

On 28 May 1940, the King surrendered to the Germans alongside his soldiers. That violated the constitution, as it contradicted the orders of his ministers, who wanted him to follow the example of the Dutch Queen Wilhelmina and flee to France or England to rally resistance. His refusal to leave Belgium undermined his political legitimacy in the eyes of many Belgians, and was viewed as a sign of his support for the new order. He was denounced by the Belgian Prime Minister, Hubert Pierlot, and declared "incompetent to reign" by the government in exile.

Leopold was keen to find an accommodation with Germany in 1940, hoping that Belgium would remain as a unified and semi-autonomous state within a German-dominated Europe. As part of this plan, in November 1940, Leopold visited Adolf Hitler, the Führer of Germany, in Berchtesgaden to ask for Belgian prisoners of war to be freed. No agreement was reached, and Leopold returned to Belgium. This fueled the belief that Leopold, who had expressed anti-Semitic views before the war, was collaborating with the Nazis rather than defending his country's interests.

For the rest of the war, Leopold was held under house-arrest in the Palace of Laeken. In 1941, while still incarcerated, he married Mary Lilian Baels, undermining his popularity with the Belgian public, which disliked Baels and considered the marriage to discredit his claim to martyr status. Despite his position, he remained prominent in the occupied territory, and coins and stamps continued to carry his portrait or monogramme. While imprisoned, he sent a letter to Hitler in 1942 credited with saving an estimated 500,000 Belgian women and children from forced deportation to munitions factories in Germany. In January 1944, Leopold was moved to Germany where he remained for the rest of the war.

Despite his position, Leopold remained a figurehead for right-wing resistance movements and Allied propaganda portrayed him as a martyr, sharing his country's fate. Attempts by the government in exile to pursue Leopold to defect to the Allied side were unsuccessful; Leopold consistently refused to publicly support the Allies, or denounce German actions such as the deportation of Belgian workers. After the war, allegations that Leopold's surrender had been an act of collaboration provoked a political crisis over whether he could return to the throne, known as the Royal Question. While a majority voted in March 1950 for Leopold's return to Belgium as king, his return in July 1950 was greeted with widespread protests in Wallonia and a general strike which turned deadly when police opened fire on protesters, killing four on 31 July. The next day Leopold announced his intention to abdicate in favour of his son, Baudouin, who took a constitutional oath before the United Chambers of the Belgian Parliament as Prince Royal on 11 August 1950. Leopold formally abdicated on 16 July 1951 and Baudouin ascended the throne and again took a constitutional oath the following day.

== Life in occupied Belgium ==
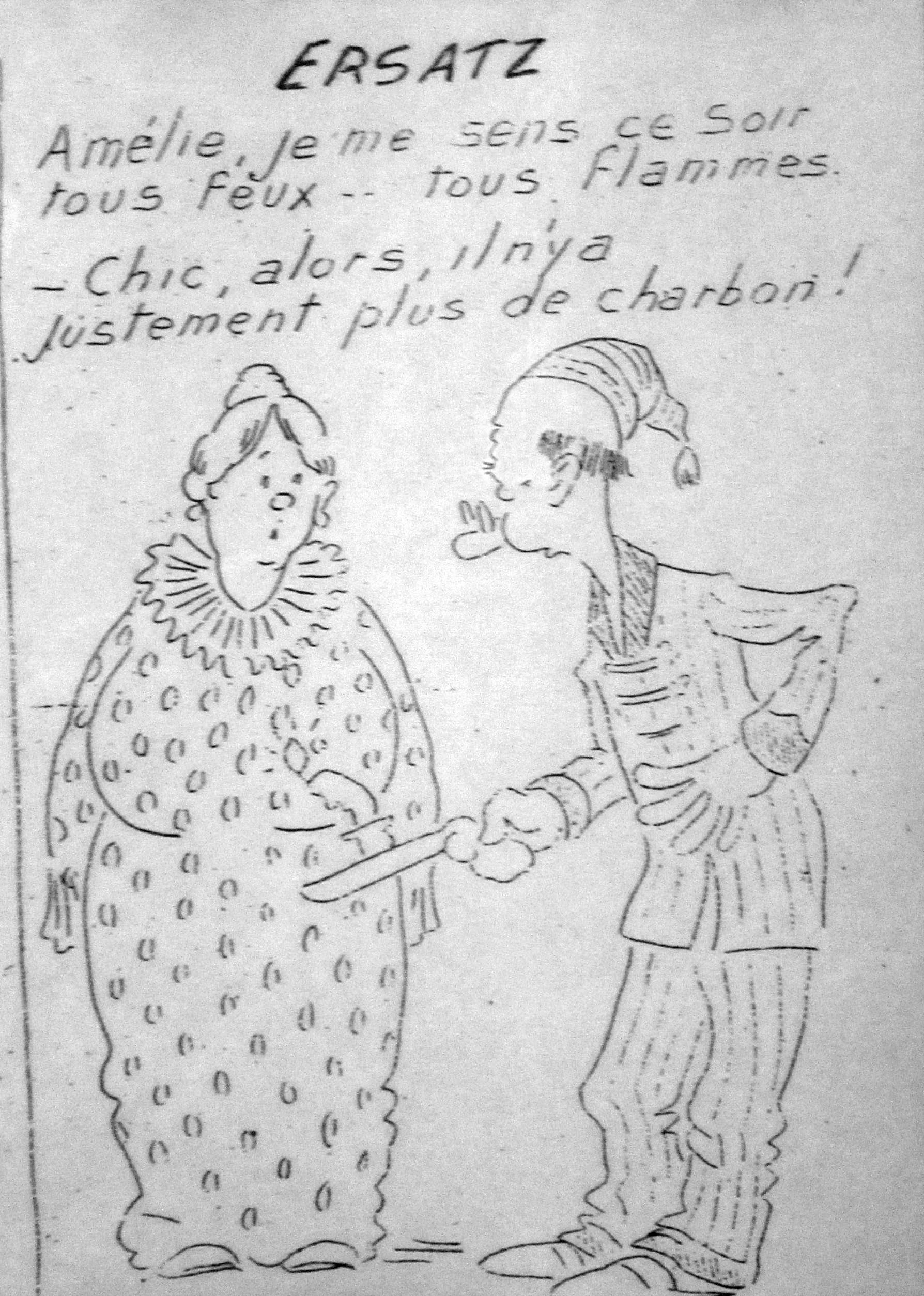
Contemporary cartoon satirising fuel shortages in occupied Belgium. The man is saying: "Amélie, I feel...all fired up" to which the woman replies "Great, because there isn't any more coal left".

Living standards in occupied Belgium decreased significantly from pre-war levels. Wages stagnated, while the occupying authorities tripled the amount of money in circulation, leading to rampant inflation.

The occupying authorities tightly controlled which newspapers could be published and what news they could print. Newspapers of pro-Nazi political parties continued to be printed, along with so-called "stolen" newspapers such as Le Soir or Het Laatste Nieuws, which were published by pro-German groups without their owners' permission. Despite the tight censorship and propagandist content, the circulation of these newspapers remained high, as did the sales of party newspapers such as Le Pays Réel and Volk en Staat. Many civilians listened to regular broadcasts from Britain, so-called Radio Belgique, despite being officially prohibited from December 1940.

Most Belgians continued their pre-war professions during the occupation. The Belgian cartoonist Hergé, whose work since 1928 had contributed to the popularisation of comics in Europe, completed three volumes of The Adventures of Tintin under the occupation, serialised in the pro-German newspaper Le Soir.

=== Rationing ===
Before the war, the Belgian government had planned an emergency system of rationing, which was implemented on the day of the German invasion. The German occupying authority used Belgium's reliance on food imports as a bargaining tool. The amount of food permitted to Belgian citizens was roughly two-thirds of that allowed to comparable German citizens, amongst the lowest in occupied Europe. On average, scarcity of food led to a loss of five to seven kilograms of weight per Belgian in 1940 alone.

A Belgian citizen was entitled to 225 grams (7.9 oz) of bread each day, and 250 grams (8.8 oz) of butter, 1 kilogram (2.2 lb) sugar, 1 kilogram (2.2 lb) meat and 15 kilograms (33 lb) of potatoes each month. Later in the war, even this was not always available and many civilians survived by fishing or growing vegetables in allotments.

Because of the tight rationing, a black market in food and other consumer goods emerged. Food on the black market was extremely expensive. Prices could be 650 percent higher than in legal shops and rose constantly during the war. Because of the profits to be made, the black market spawned large and well-organised networks. Numerous members of the German administration were involved in the black market, stealing military or official supplies and reselling them.

=== Allied bombing ===
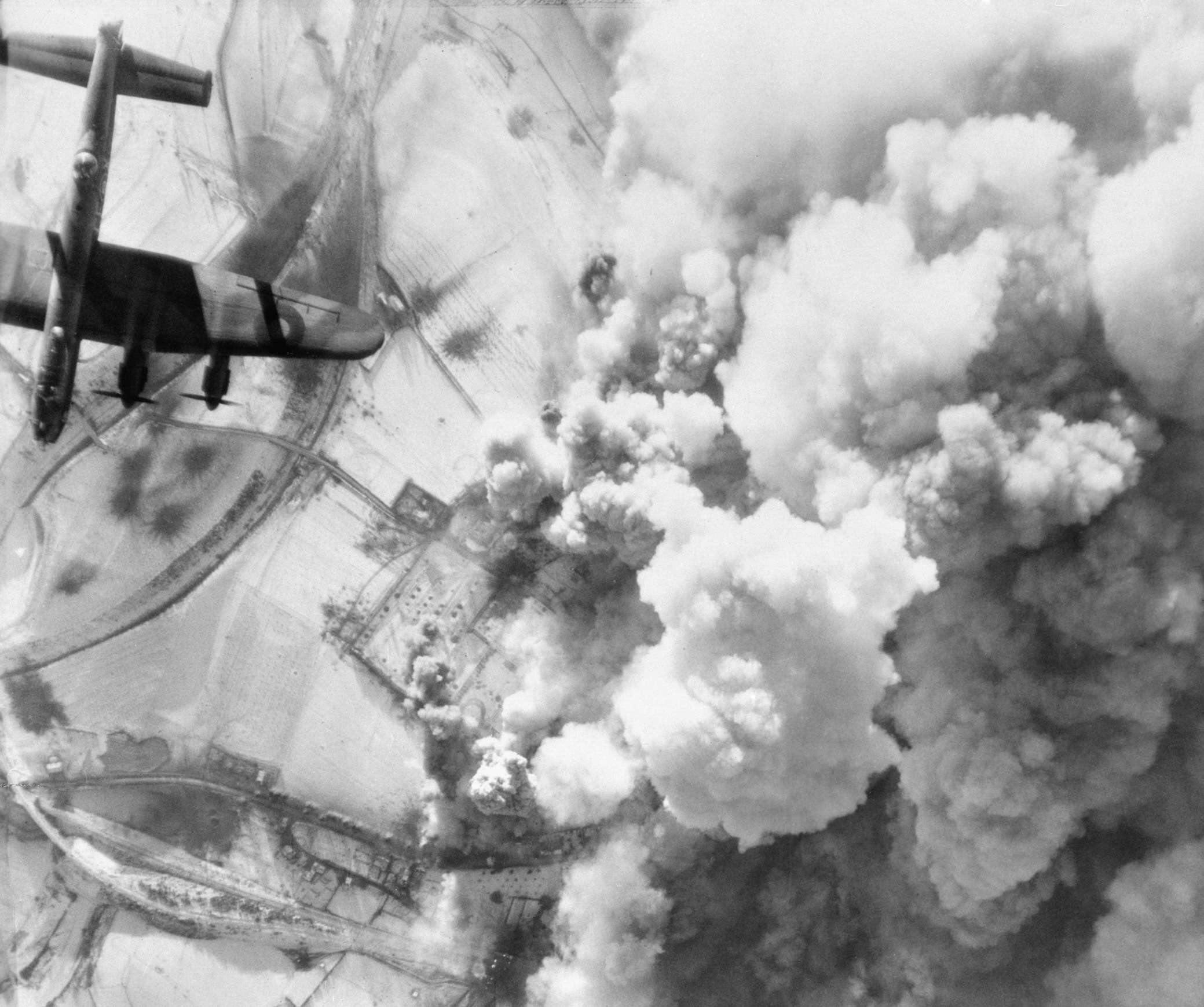
RAF Lancaster bombers attack the Belgian town of St. Vith in the Ardennes, 1944.

Factories, ports and other strategic sites used by the German war effort were frequent targets of Allied bombers from both the British Royal Air Force (RAF) and American United States Army Air Forces (USAAF). Many of these were located in towns and cities, and inaccuracy of the bombing resulted in substantial civilian casualties.

In the early years of the occupation, Allied bombing took the form of small-scale attacks on specific targets, such as the ports of Knokke and Zeebrugge, and on Luftwaffe airfields. The Germans encouraged the building of 6,000 air-raid shelters between 1941 and 1942, at a cost of 220 million francs. From 1943, the Allies began targeting sites in urban areas. In a raid on the Erla Motor Works in the town of Mortsel (near Antwerp) on 5 April 1943, just two bombs dropped by the B-17 Flying Fortresses of the U.S. 8th Air Force fell on the intended target. The remaining 24 tonnes of bombs fell on civilian areas, killing 936 and injuring 1,340 more.

During the preparation for D-Day in the spring of 1944, the Allies launched the Transport Plan, carrying out intensive bombing of railway junctions and transport networks across northern France and Belgium. Many of these targets were in towns near densely populated civilian areas, such as La Louvière and Kortrijk in Belgium, which were bombed in March 1944. The phase of bombing in the lead up to D-Day alone resulted in 1,500 civilian casualties. Bombing of targets in Belgium steadily increased as the Allies advanced westward across France. Allied bombing during the liberation in September 1944 killed 9,750 Belgians and injured 40,000.

The Allied policy was condemned by many leading figures in Belgium, including Cardinal van Roey, who appealed to Allied commanders to "spare the private possessions of the citizens, as otherwise the civilised world will one day call to account those responsible for the terrible treatment dealt out to an innocent and loyal country".

== Economic situation ==
The German government levied the costs of the military occupation on the Belgians through taxes, while also demanding "external occupation costs" (or "Anti-Bolshevik charges") to support operations elsewhere. In total, Belgium was forced to pay nearly two-thirds of its national income for these charges, equalling 5.7 billion Reichsmarks (equivalent to 23 billion 2021 euros) over the course of the occupation. The value of the Belgian franc was artificially suppressed, further increasing the size of the Anti-Bolshevik charge and benefitting German companies exporting to the occupied country.

The considerable Belgian gold reserves, on which the Belga had been secured, (Note: The Belga was a gold-based currency parallel to the Belgian franc, intended for export transactions. It was fixed at one Belga to 5 francs and was suspended during the war.) were mostly transported to Britain, Canada and the United States before the German invasion. Over 198 tonnes, however, had been entrusted to the Banque de France before the war, and shipped to Dakar in French West Africa. Under the pro-German Vichy régime, the gold was seized by the Germans, who used it to buy munitions from neutral Switzerland and Sweden.

=== Galopin Doctrine ===
Before fleeing in May 1940, the Belgian government established a body of important economic figures, under the leadership of Alexandre Galopin, known as the "Galopin Committee". Galopin was the director of the Société Générale de Belgique (SGB), a company which dominated the Belgian economy and controlled almost 40 percent of the country's industrial production. The committee was able to negotiate with the German authorities and was also in contact with the government in exile.

Galopin pioneered a controversial policy, known as the "Galopin Doctrine". The Doctrine decreed that Belgian companies continue producing goods necessary for the Belgian population (food, consumer goods etc.) under the German occupiers, but refused to produce war materiel or anything which could be used in the German war effort. The policy hoped to prevent a repeat of World War I, when the Allies had encouraged Belgian workers to passively resist the Germans by refusing to work. The Germans instead deported Belgian workers and industrial machinery to German factories, benefitting their economy more. The policy also hoped to avoid an industrial decline which would have negative effects on the country's recovery after the war; however, many viewed the policy as collaboration. Between 1941 and 1942, the German authorities began to force Belgian businessmen to make an explicit choice between obeying the Doctrine (and refusing to produce war materials, at risk of death) and circumventing the doctrine as collaborators.

=== Deportation and forced labour ===
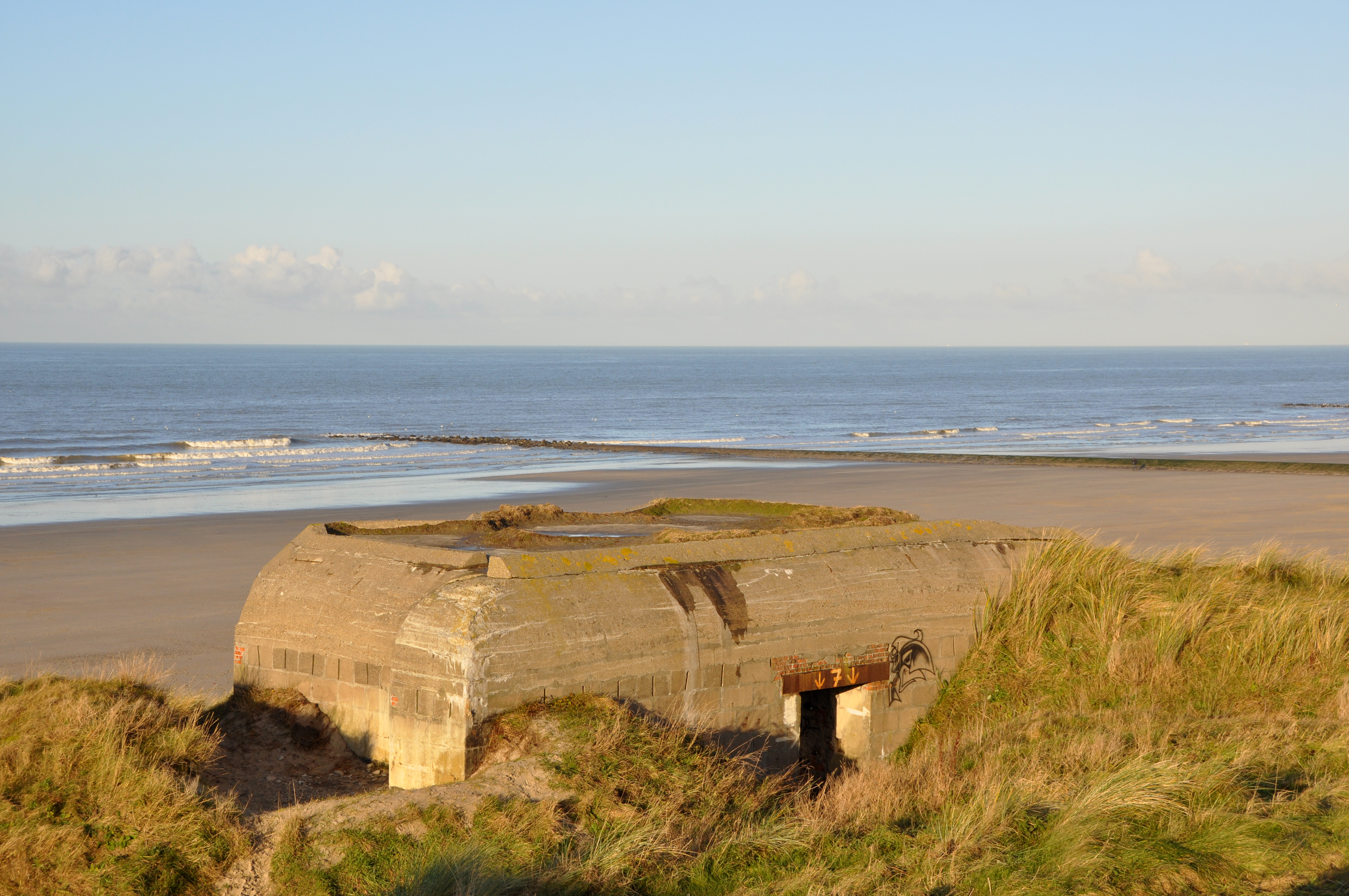
A German bunker of the Atlantic Wall near Ostend, constructed by Organisation Todt

Before 1941, Belgian workers could volunteer to work in Germany; nearly 180,000 Belgians signed up, hoping for better pay and living conditions. About 3,000 Belgians joined the Organisation Todt (OT), and 4,000 more joined the paramilitary German supply corps, the Nationalsozialistisches Kraftfahrkorps (NSKK). The numbers, however, proved insufficient. Despite the protestation of the Secretaries-General, compulsory deportation of Belgian workers to Germany began in October 1942. At the beginning of the scheme, Belgian firms were obliged to select 10 percent of their work force, but from 1943 workers were conscripted by age class. 145,000 Belgians were conscripted and sent to Germany, most to work in manual jobs in industry or agriculture for the German war effort. Working conditions for forced workers in Germany were notoriously poor. Workers were paid little and worked long hours, and those in German towns were particularly vulnerable to Allied aerial bombing.

Following the introduction of compulsory deportation 200,000 Belgian workers (dubbed réfractaires or onderduikers) went into hiding for fear of being conscripted. The réfractaires were often aided by resistance organisations, such as Organisation Socrates run by the Front de l'Indépendance, who provided food and false papers. Many réfractaires went on to enlist in resistance groups, swelling their numbers enormously from late 1942.

== Belgian prisoners of war ==
After the Belgian defeat, around 225,000 Belgian soldiers (around 30 percent of the total force mobilised in 1940) who had been made prisoners of war in 1940 were sent to prisoner of war camps in Germany. The majority of those in captivity (145,000) were Flemish, and 80,000 were Walloons. Most had been reservists, rather than professional soldiers, before the outbreak of war and their detention created a large labour shortage in civilian occupations.

As part of their Flamenpolitik, the Germans began repatriating Flemish prisoners of war in August 1940. By February 1941, 105,833 Flemish soldiers had been repatriated. Gradually, more prisoners were released, but 67,000 Belgian soldiers were still in captivity by 1945. Many prisoners of war were forced to work in quarries or in agriculture and around 2,000 died in captivity.

== Repression ==
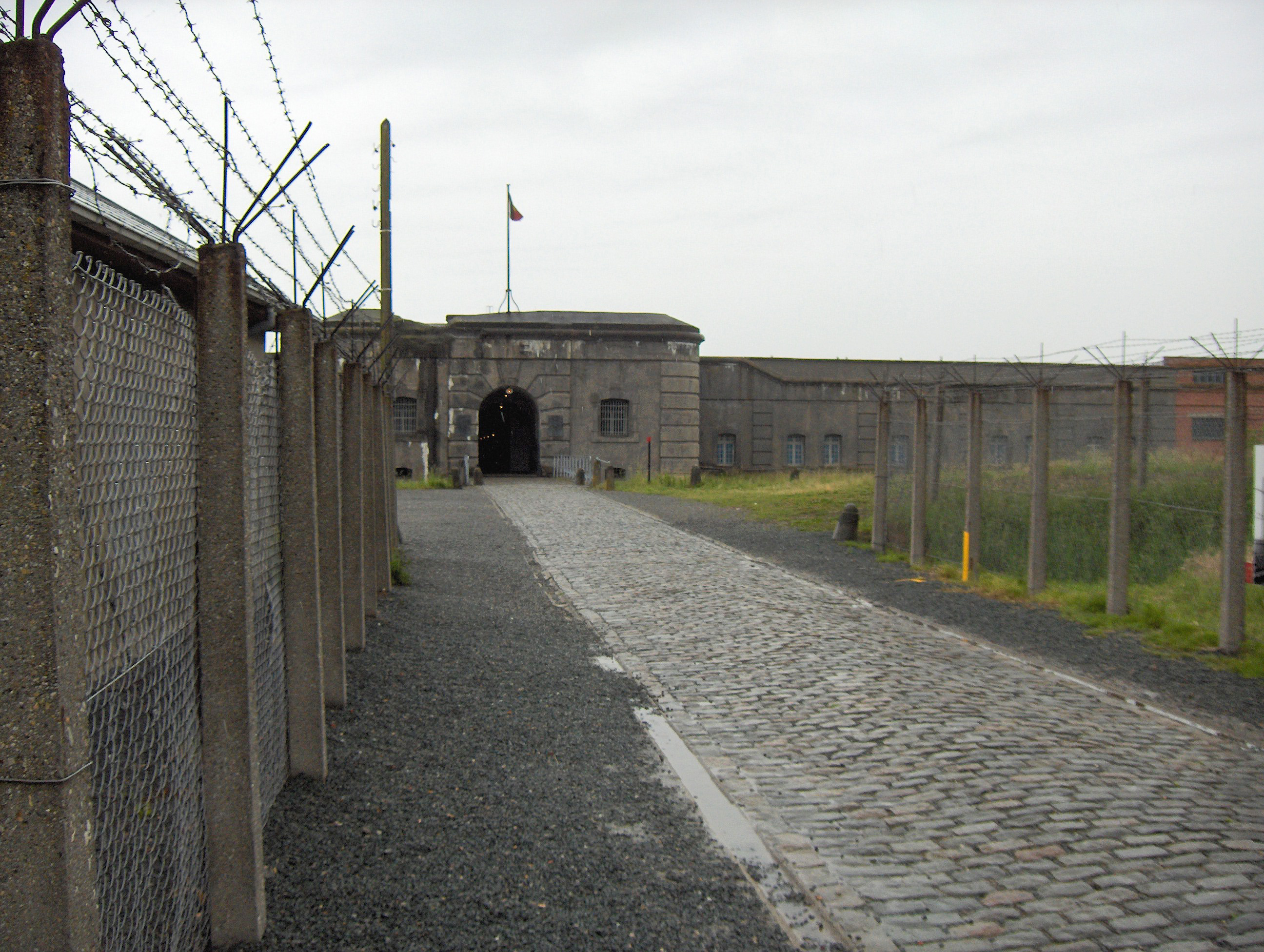
View of the entrance to Fort Breendonk, a prison camp largely reserved for resistance members and political dissidents, near Mechelen

In the first year of the occupation, the German administration pursued a conciliatory policy toward the Belgian people in order to gain their support and co-operation. This policy was, in part, because there was little resistance activity and because the demands the Germans needed to place on Belgian civilians and businesses were relatively small on account of their military success. During the fighting in Belgium, however, there were incidents of massacres against Belgian civilians by German forces, notably the Vinkt Massacre in which 86 civilians were killed.

From 1941, the regime became significantly more repressive. This was partly a result of the increasing demands on the German economy created by the invasion of the Soviet Union, as well as the decision to implement Nazi racial policies. From August 1941, the Military Government announced that for every German killed by the resistance, five Belgian civilian hostages would be executed. Although the German military command, the Oberkommando der Wehrmacht (OKW), had advised a ratio of 50 civilians for every one German soldier killed, von Falkenhausen moderated the policy and decreed that the hostages be selected from political prisoners and criminals rather than civilians picked at random. The systematic persecution of minorities (such as Jews, Roma and Freemasons) began from 1942, and was also coupled with much stricter repression of Belgian political dissent.

=== Persecution of Jews and the Holocaust ===
At the start of the war, the population of Belgium was overwhelmingly Catholic. Jews made up the largest non-Christian population in the country, numbering between 70 and 75,000 out of a population of 8 million. Most lived in large towns and cities in Belgium, such as Antwerp and Brussels. The vast majority were recent immigrants to Belgium fleeing persecution in Germany and Eastern Europe and, as a result, only a small minority actually possessed Belgian citizenship.

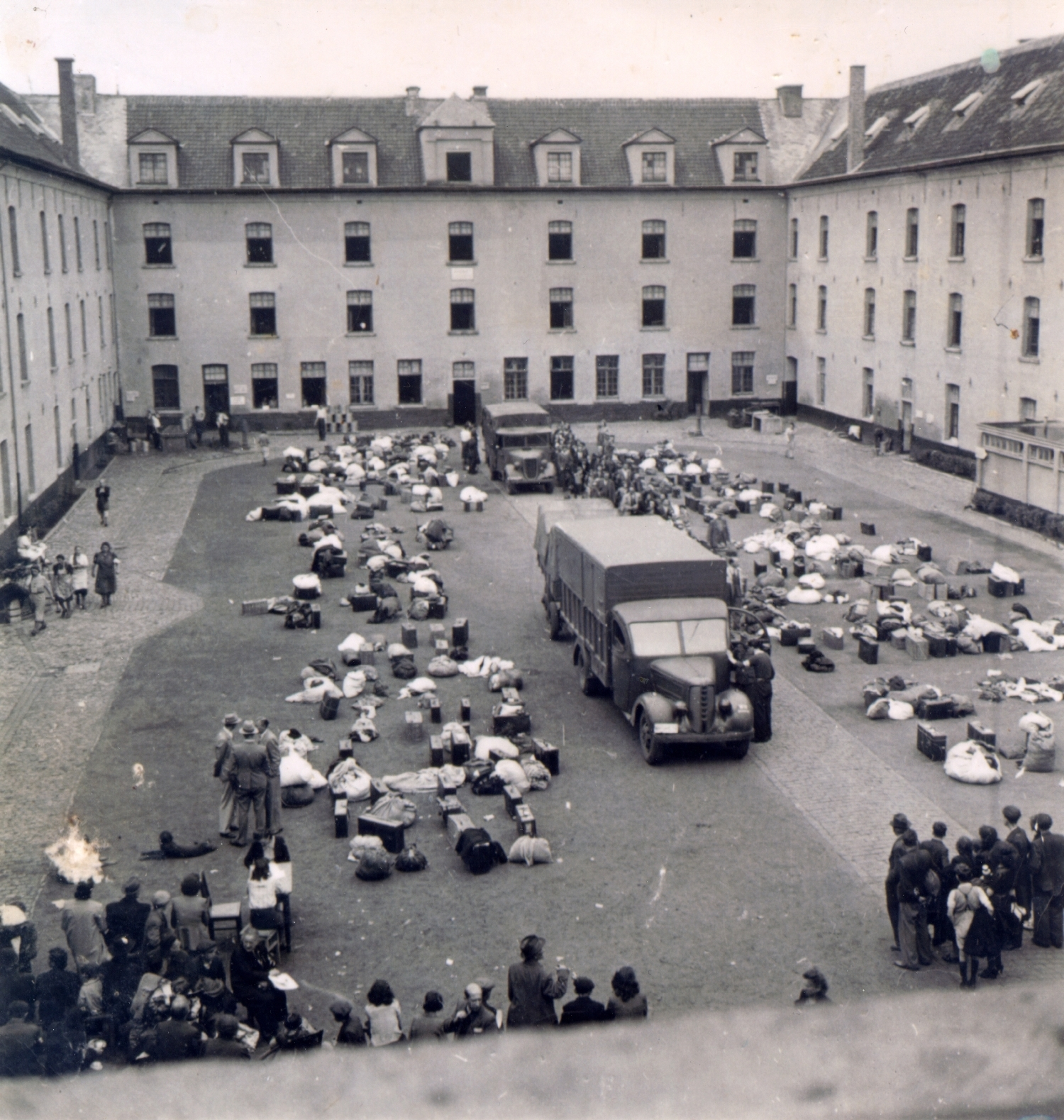
Mechelen transit camp in 1942 after the arrival of Belgian Jews caught during the night

Shortly after the invasion of Belgium, the Military Government passed a series of anti-Jewish laws (similar to the Vichy laws on the status of Jews) in October 1940. The Committee of Secretaries-General refused from the start to co-operate on passing any anti-Jewish measures and the Military Government seemed unwilling to pass further legislation. The German government began to seize Jewish-owned business and forced Jews out of positions in the civil service. In April 1941, without orders from the German authorities, members of the Algemeene-SS Vlaanderen and other Flemish fascists pillaged two synagogues in Antwerp and burned the house of the chief Rabbi of the town in the so-called "Antwerp Pogrom". The Germans also created a Judenrat in the country, the Association des Juifs en Belgique (AJB; "Association of Jews in Belgium") in which all Jews were required to inscribe.

As part of the "Final Solution" from 1942, the persecution of Belgian Jews escalated. From May 1942, Jews were forced to wear yellow Star-of-David badges to mark them out in public. Using the registers compiled by the AJB, the Germans began deporting Jews to concentration camps built by Germans in occupied Poland. Jews chosen from the lists were required to turn up at the newly established Mechelen transit camp; they were then deported by train to concentration camps at Auschwitz and Bergen-Belsen. Between August 1942 and July 1944, around 25,000 Jews and 350 Roma were deported from Belgium; more than 24,000 were killed before their camps were liberated by the Allies. Among them was the celebrated artist Felix Nussbaum.

From 1942 and the introduction of the Star-of-David badges, opposition to the treatment of the Jews among the general population in Belgium grew. By the end of the occupation, more than 40 percent of all Jews in Belgium were in hiding; many of them hid by gentiles and in particular Catholic priests and nuns. Some were helped by the organised resistance, such as the Comité de Défense des Juifs (CDJ), which provided food and safe housing. Many of the Jews in hiding went on to join the armed resistance. The treatment of Jews was denounced by the senior Catholic priest in Belgium, Cardinal Jozef-Ernest van Roey, who described their treatment as "inhuman". The Partisans Armés had a notably large Jewish section in Brussels. In April 1943, members of the CDJ attacked the twentieth rail convoy to Auschwitz and succeeded in rescuing many of the passengers.

=== Political dissent ===
Because of the Nazi-Soviet Pact, signed in 1939, the Communist Party was briefly tolerated in the early stages of the occupation. Coinciding with the invasion of the Soviet Union in June 1941 however, the Germans rounded up a large number of Communists (identified in police dossiers compiled before the war) in an operation codenamed "Summer Solstice" (Sommersonnenwende). In September 1942, the Germans arrested over 400 workers which they feared were plotting a large-scale strike action.

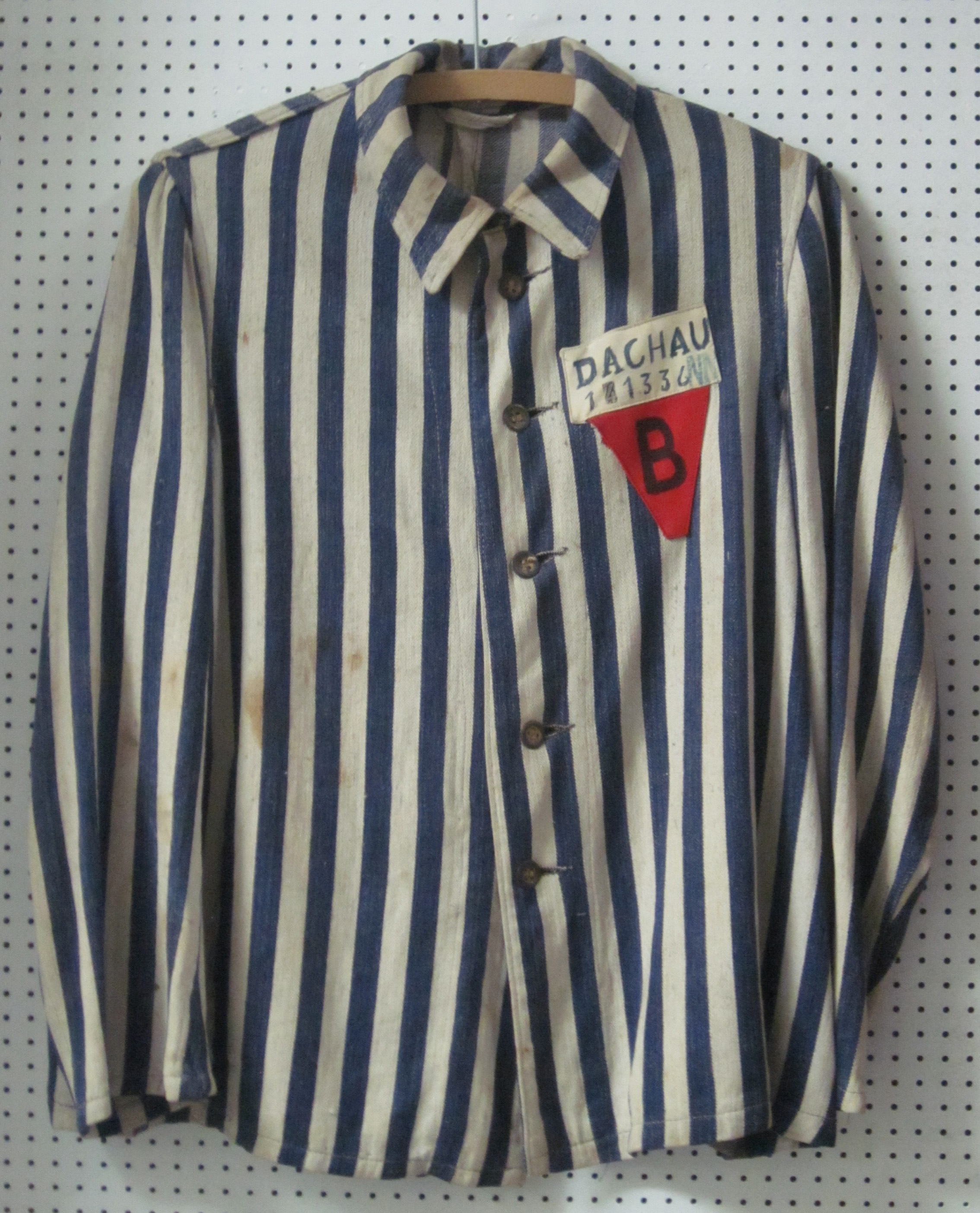
Uniform of a prisoner in Dachau. The red triangle (with the letter "B") identifies the wearer as a political prisoner from Belgium.

Many important politicians who had opposed the Nazis before the war were arrested and deported to concentration camps in Germany and German-occupied Poland, as part of the Nacht und Nebel (literally "Night and Fog") decree. Among them was the 71-year-old Paul-Émile Janson who had served as Prime Minister between 1937 and 1938. He was arrested at his home in Belgium in 1943 and deported to Buchenwald concentration camp where he died in 1944. Many captured members of the resistance were also sent to concentration camps. Albert Guérisse (one of the leading members of the "Pat" escape line) was imprisoned at Dachau and briefly served as president of the camp's "International Prisoners' Committee" after its liberation by the United States Army.

In 1940, the German army requisitioned a former Belgian army fort at Breendonk and transformed it into an Anhaltelager or prison camp. Initially, the prison camp was used for detaining Jews, but from 1941 most of those detained at Breendonk were political prisoners or captured members of the resistance. Though it was reasonably small, the camp was infamous for its poor conditions and high death rate. It was also where summary executions of hostages as reprisals for resistance actions occurred. Unusually, Breendonk was mainly guarded by Flemish collaborators of the Vlaamse SD-wacht, rather than German soldiers. Prisoners were often tortured, or even mauled by the camp commander's dog, and forced to move tonnes of earth around the fort by hand. Many were summarily executed and still more died as a result of the conditions at the camp. Of the 3,500 people incarcerated in Breendonk between November 1942 and April 1943, around 300 people were killed in the camp itself with at least 84 dying as a result of deprivation or torture. Few inmates remained long in Breendonk itself and were sent on to larger concentration camps in Germany.

== Collaboration ==
Both Flanders and Wallonia had right-wing Fascist parties which had been established in the 1930s, often with their own newspapers and paramilitary organisations. All had supported the Belgian policy of neutrality before the war, but after the start of the occupation began to collaborate actively with the Germans. Because of their different ideological backgrounds, they often differed with the Nazis on a variety of ideological issues such as the role of Catholicism or the status of Flanders. Though allowed more freedom than other political groups, the Germans did not fully trust these organisations and, even by the end of 1941, identified them as a potential "threat to state security".

After the war, 53,000 Belgian citizens (0.6 percent of the population) were found guilty of collaboration, providing the only estimate of the number involved during the period. Around 15,000 Belgians served in two separate divisions of the Waffen-SS, divided along linguistic lines. In particular, many Belgians were persuaded to work with the occupiers as a result of long-running hostility to Communism, particularly after the invasion of the Soviet Union in 1941.

By 1944, Belgian collaborationist groups began to feel increasingly abandoned by the German government as the situation deteriorated. As resistance attacks against them escalated, collaborationist parties became more violent and launched reprisals against civilians, including the Courcelles Massacre in August 1944.

=== In Flanders ===
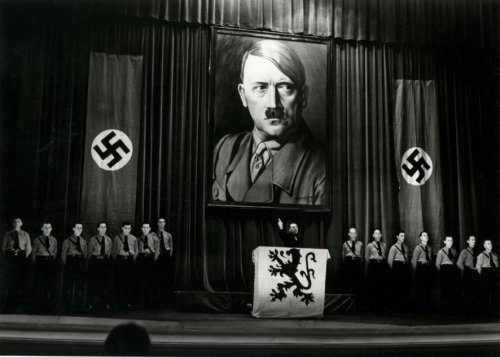
An Algemeene-SS Vlaanderen meeting in Ghent in 1941

Before the war, several Fascist movements had existed in Flanders. The two major pre-war Flemish Movement parties, the Vlaams Nationaal Verbond (VNV) and Verdinaso, called for the creation of an independent authoritarian Flanders or "Dietse Staat" encompassing both Flanders and the Netherlands. Shortly after the occupation, VNV decided to collaborate with the Germans and soon became the biggest group in Flanders, gaining many members after Verdinaso disbanded in 1941 and after fusing with the Flemish wing of the nationwide Fascist Rex Party. There was also an organisation, the Duits-Vlaamse Arbeidsgemeenschap ("German-Flemish Work Community", known by its acronym DeVlag), which advocated Nazi-style anti-clericalism and the inclusion of Flanders into Germany itself.

During the occupation in World War I, the Germans had favoured the Flemish area of the country in the so-called Flamenpolitik, supporting Flemish cultural and political movements. This policy was continued during World War II, as the military government encouraged Flemish Movement parties, especially the VNV, and promoted Flemish nationalists, like Victor Leemans, to important administrative positions in the occupied territory. In turn, the VNV was important in recruiting men for a new "Flemish Legion", an infantry unit within the Wehrmacht, formed in July 1941 after the invasion of Russia. In 1943, the legion was "annexed" into the Waffen SS as the 27th SS Langemarck Division, despite the protestations of the party. The unit fought on the Eastern Front, where it suffered 10 percent casualties. The Germans also encouraged the formation of independent Flemish paramilitary organisations, such as the Vlaamse Wacht ("Flemish Guard"), founded in May 1941, which they hoped would eventually be able to act as a garrison in the region, freeing German troops for the front.

From 1942, VNV's dominance was increasingly challenged by the more radical DeVlag, which had the support of the SS and Nazi Party. DeVlag was closely affiliated to the paramilitary Algemeene-SS Vlaanderen ("General-SS Flanders"), which was stationed in Belgium itself and involved in the so-called Antwerp Pogrom of 1941.

=== In Wallonia ===
Though both Fascist and anti-Semitic, Rex's ideology had been more closely aligned with Benito Mussolini's Partito Nazionale Fascista than with the Nazi Party before the war. Rex's newspaper Le Pays Réel, which frequently attacked perceived Nazi anti-clericalism, had even been banned from circulation in Germany in the 1930s. With the German invasion, however, Rex rapidly accepted the occupation and became a major force in collaboration in Wallonia.

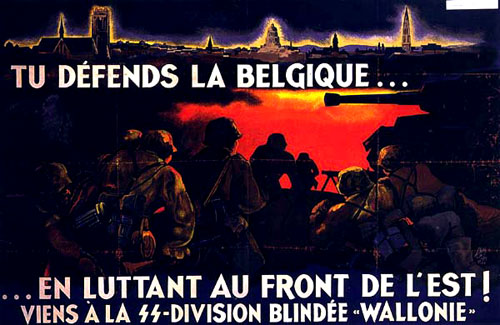
A recruitment poster for the French-speaking 28th SS "Wallonien" division. The caption reads "You defend Belgium... by fighting on the Eastern Front".

As a result of the Flamenpolitik, Rex was not given the same favoured status accorded to Flemish Fascists. Nevertheless, it was permitted to republish its newspaper and re-establish and expand its paramilitary wing, the Formations de Combat, which had been banned before the war. In April 1943, Rex declared itself part of the SS. The Formations de Combat were responsible for numerous attacks against Jews and, from 1944, also participated in arbitrary reprisals against civilians for attacks by the resistance. In 1944, Rexist paramilitaries massacred 20 civilians in the village of Courcelles in retaliation for an assassination of a Rexist politician by members of the resistance.

Léon Degrelle, the founder and leader of Rex, offered to form a "Walloon Legion" in the Wehrmacht, but his request was denied by the Germans who questioned its feasibility. It was finally accepted in July 1941, after the invasion of Russia, and Degrelle enlisted. As part of the Flamenpolitik, the Germans refused Degrelle's demands for a "Belgian Legion", preferring to support the creation of separate linguistic units. After a brief period of fighting, it became clear that the Walloon Legion suffered from a lack of training and from political infighting. It was reformed and sent to the Eastern Front, and became part of the Waffen SS (as the 28th SS Wallonien Division) in 1943. During the fighting at the Korsun–Cherkassy Pocket, the unit was nearly annihilated and its popular commander, Lucien Lippert, was killed. In order to make up numbers, and because of a lack of Belgian volunteers, the unit was allocated French and Spanish volunteers.

== Resistance ==
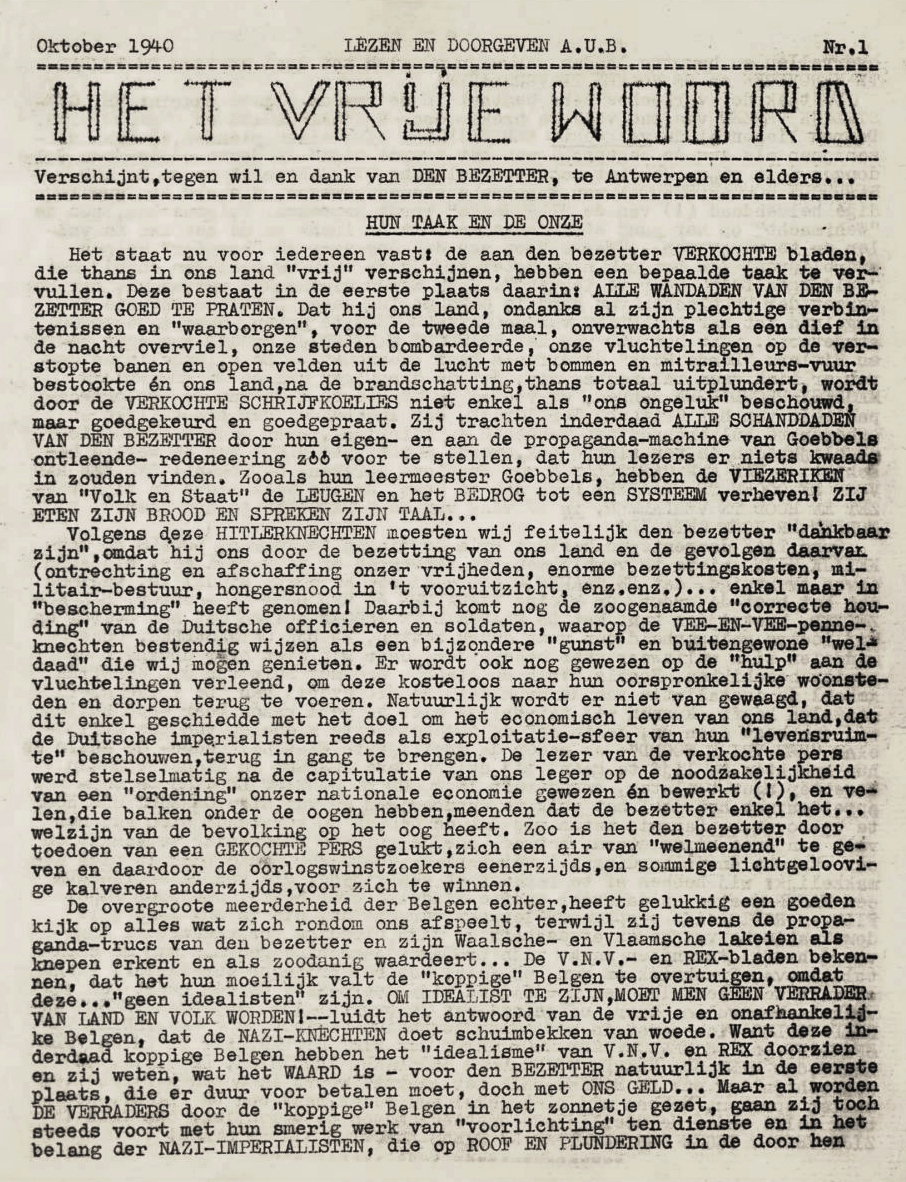
Het Vrije Woord, a typical Dutch-language underground newspaper

Resistance to the German occupiers began in Belgium in the winter of 1940, after the German defeat in the Battle of Britain made it clear that the war was not lost for the Allies. Involvement in illegal resistance activity was a decision made by a minority of Belgians (approximately five percent of the population) but many more were involved in passive resistance. If captured, resistance members risked torture and execution, and around 17,000 were killed during the occupation.

Striking was the most notable form of passive resistance and often took place on symbolic dates, such as 10 May (the anniversary of the German invasion), 21 July (National Day) and 11 November (anniversary of the German surrender in World War I). The largest was the "Strike of the 100,000", which broke out on 10 May 1941 in the Cockerill steel works in Seraing. News of the strike spread rapidly and soon at least 70,000 workers were on strike across the province of Liége. (Note: The official spelling for the province (and town of the same name) at the time was "Liége" with an acute accent. This was changed to the current version (with a grave accent) in 1946, though the pronunciation was unaffected.) The Germans increased workers' salaries by eight percent and the strike finished rapidly. The Germans repressed later large-scale strikes, though further important strikes occurred in November 1942 and February 1943. Passive resistance, however, could also take the form of much more minor actions, such as offering one's seat in trams to Jews, which was not explicitly illegal but which subtly subverted the German-imposed order.

Active resistance in Belgium took the form of sabotaging railways and lines of communication as well as hiding Jews and Allied airmen. The resistance produced large numbers of illegal newspapers in both French and Dutch, distributed to the public to provide news about the war not available in officially approved, censored newspapers. Some such publications achieved considerable success, such as La Libre Belgique, which reached a circulation of 70,000. Attacks on German soldiers were comparatively rare as the German administration made a practice of executing at least five Belgian hostages for each German soldier killed. At great personal risk, Belgian civilians also hid large numbers of Jews and political dissenters hunted by the Germans. (Note: The Museum van Deportatie en Verzet puts the number at 20,000 Jews, including 3,000 children. The historian Eva Fogelman supplies a figure of 20,000 adults and 8,000 children in hiding.)

Belgian groups such as the Comet Line specialized in helping allied airmen shot down by the Germans evade capture. They sheltered the airmen and, at great risk to themselves, escorted them through occupied France to neutral Spain from where the airmen could be transported back to Britain.

The resistance was never a single group; numerous groups evolved divided by political affiliation, geography or specialisation. The danger of infiltration posed by German informants meant that some groups were extremely small and localised, and although nationwide groups did exist, they were split along political and ideological lines. They ranged from the far left, such as the Communist Partisans Armés or Socialist Front de l'Indépendance, to the far-right, such as the monarchist Mouvement National Royaliste and the Légion Belge, which had been created by members of the pre-war Fascist Légion Nationale movement. Some, such as Groupe G, had no obvious political affiliation, but specialised in particular types of resistance activity and recruited only from very specific demographics.

== Liberation ==
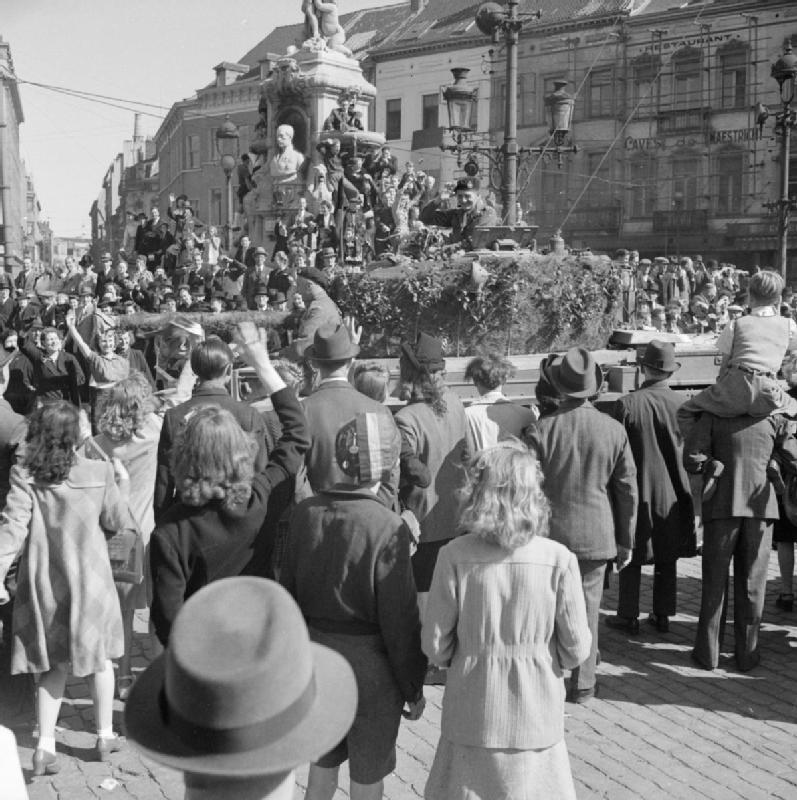
British tanks arrive in Brussels on 4 September 1944, ending the German occupation.

In June 1944, the Western Allies landed in Normandy in Northern France, around 400 kilometres (250 mi) west of the Belgian border. After fierce fighting in the areas around the landing sites, the Allies broke through the German lines and began advances toward Paris and then toward the Belgian border. By August, the main body of the German army in Northern France (with the exception of the garrisons of fortified towns such as Dunkirk) was openly retreating eastward. As the Allies neared the border, coded messages broadcast on Radio Belgique encouraged the resistance to rise up. The German civil administrator, Joseph Grohé, ordered a general retreat from the country on 28 August, and on 1 September the first Allied units (amongst them the Free Belgian SAS) crossed the Belgian frontier. By 4 September, Brussels was in Allied hands. The Belgian government in exile returned to the country on 8 September and began rebuilding the Belgian state and army. Leopold III's brother, Charles, was appointed Prince-Regent while a decision was made about whether the King could return to his functions. As the German army regrouped and the Allies' supply lines became stretched, the front line stabilised along Belgium's eastern border. Areas in the south-east of the country remained in German hands, and were briefly recaptured during the German Ardennes Offensive in the winter of 1944. This no more than delayed the total liberation of the country and on 4 February 1945, with the capture of the village of Krewinkel, the entire country was in Allied hands.

Over the course of the occupation, a total of 40,690 Belgians were killed, over half of them Jews. Around eight percent of the country's pre-war GDP had been destroyed or removed to Germany.

== See also ==
- Belgium in World War II
- Belgian Congo in World War II
- German occupation of Luxembourg in World War II
- Secret Army – a television series about resistance in Belgium, 1977–79.

== Bibliography ==
=== Primary sources ===
- Jacquemyns, Guillaume; Struye, Paul (2002). La Belgique sous l'Occupation Allemande: 1940–1944 (in French) (Rev. ed.). Brussels: Éd. Complexe. ISBN 2-87027-940-X.

=== General histories ===
- Warmbrunn, Werner (1993). The German Occupation of Belgium, 1940–1944. New York: Peter Lang. ISBN 978-0-8204-1773-8.
- Van den Wijngaert, Mark; De Wever, Bruno; et al. (2004). België tijdens de Tweede Wereldoorlog. Antwerp: Standaard Uitgeverij.
- De Launay, Jacques; Offergeld, Jacques (1982). La Vie Quotidienne des Belges sous l'Occupation, 1940-1945. Brussels: Éd. Paul Legrain. OCLC 768247730.

=== Thematic studies ===
- Conway, Martin (1993). Collaboration in Belgium: Léon Degrelle and the Rexist Movement, 1940–1944. New Haven: Yale University Press. ISBN 0-300-05500-5.
- Van Doorslaer, Rudi (dir.); et al. (2007). La Belgique Docile (in French). Brussels: CEGES-SOMA.
- De Launay, Jacques; Offergeld, Jacques (1982). La Vie Quotidienne des Belges sous l'Occupation (1940–1945) (in French). Brussels: Éd. Paul Legrain.
- Bernard, Henri (1968). La Résistance 1940–1945 (in French). Brussels: Éd. Renaissance du livre.
- Wouters, Nico (2004). Oorlogsburgemeesters 40/44: Lokaal bestuur en collaboratie in België (in Dutch). Tielt: Lannoo. ISBN 9789020957587.
