= Wies Moens =

Flemish historian, pamphleteer, poet

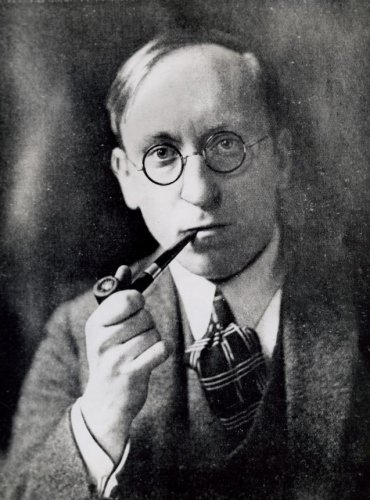
- Born: 28 January 1898; Sint-Gillis-bij-Dendermonde, Belgium
- Died: 5 February 1982 (aged 84); Neerbeek, Limburg, Netherlands
- Occupations: historian, poet, writer

Wies Moens (28 January 1898 – 5 February 1982) was a Belgian literary historian, poet and Flamingant activist. He was also a founding member of the right-wing Verdinaso movement.

== Life ==
He was born in Sint-Gillis-bij-Dendermonde, the only child of baker Karel Moens and Johanna Moreels. Between 1916 and 1918 he studied German philology at the Vlaamsche Hoogeschool in Ghent (the first institution of higher education in Belgium using Dutch as the medium of instruction set up during the German occupation). He was active in the Flemish Movement and was, after the First World War sentenced to four years in prison for his activities during the war. The Flemish Literary Society requested his release through a petition signed by many, and in March 1921 Moens was set free. His expressionistic poetry was published in Ruimte magazine, which also published Paul van Ostaijen. In addition, he was secretary of the Vlaamsche Volkstooneel (Flemish People's Theatre) and a journalist.

Moens became politically active in the Flemish Front Partij in 1926. His political affiliation subsequently influenced his literary work. The Dutchman Fernand Lodewick put it as follows: "Wies Moens' zeal for the Greater Netherlands idea was accompanied by a growing preference for a fascist attitude to life, as a result of which his later 'verses' turned into political pamphlets." For the general elections of 1929, he was a candidate in the district of Ghent-Eeklo, but was not elected. In 1928 he co-founded the Algemeen Vlaams Nationaal Verbond and in 1931 Moens was one of the founders of the fascist Verbond van Dietse Nationaal-Solidaristen (Verdinaso). He left this movement in 1934 because Verdinaso wanted to include Walloons and Luxembourgers with the 'new marching direction'. He became an independent theorist of nationalism, publishing in the journal Dietbrand, which he founded.

During World War II, at the start of the occupation, he applied to become inspector of public libraries: a well-paid job that left a lot of free time. He received support from the German authorities, but secretary-general Marcel Nyns opposed it and appointed Gerard Walschap to the position. Moens then became director of the Dutch-language broadcasts of the Brussels channel created by the German occupiers. He submitted his resignation at the end of 1943 as the station came increasingly under the influence of the Algemeene SS-Vlaanderen and DeVlag.

In 1947, he was sentenced to death in absentia for collaborating with Germany. He had fled to Geleen in Dutch Limburg in 1944, where he spent the rest of his life. There he became director of the Volkshogeschool and a teacher of Dutch literature in a college. In 1968, he refused on principle to avail himself of the amnesty granted by Belgium to former collaborators.

He continued to write poetry until a very old age. He is buried in Neerbeek cemetery under a tombstone, inspired by the Hero's Tribute tombstone designed by Joe English, which is meant to commemorate the First World War.

Wies Moens married Margareta Tas in 1922. The marriage remained childless.

== Bibliography ==
- Gedichten 1918
- Celbrieven (1920)
- De boodschap (1920)
- De tocht (1921)
- Opgangen (1921)
- Landing (1923)
- Golfslag (1935)
- Kalewala: het epos der Finnen (1938)
- Het vierkant (1938)
- Dertig dagen oorlog (1940)
- Nederlandsche letterkunde van volksch standpunt gezien (1941)
- Onze volksche adel (1942)
- De spitsboog (1944)
- Het spoor (1944)
- De verslagene (1963)
- Het activistisch avontuur en wat erop volgde (1966–1970)
