= Victor Leemans =

Belgian sociologist and politician

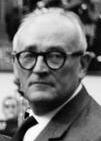

6th President of the European Parliament
- In office 1965–1966
- Preceded by: Jean Duvieusart
- Succeeded by: Alain Poher

Personal details
- Born: 21 July 1901 Stekene, Belgium
- Died: 3 March 1971 (aged 69) Leuven, Belgium
- Citizenship: Belgian
- Party: Christian Social Party
- Occupation: Politician; Sociologist

Victor Leemans (21 July 1901 – 3 March 1971) was a Belgian sociologist, politician and prominent ideologist of the radical Flemish movement in the 1930s. A member of the militant organisation Verdinaso, he is seen by some as the main Flemish exponent of the historical phenomenon known as the Conservative Revolution.

Leemans was born at Stekene, Flanders. He obtained his doctorate from the School for Advanced Studies in the Social Sciences in Paris and lectured at the Catholic University of Leuven. In 1936, he was named president of the Arbeidsorde, a Flemish fascist trade union closely tied to the Flemish National Union (VNV) and Rex-Vlaanderen.

During the German occupation of Belgium, Leemans was Director of Health and Food supply (1940), Deputy Commissioner General for Reconstruction (1940), a board member of the Emissiebank (1940–1944) and Secretary-General of Economical Affairs (1940–1944); as such he was prosecuted after the war for collaboration. He was acquitted in 1947.

Leemans pursued a political career in the Christian-democratic Christian Social Party (PSC-CVP). He was appointed provincial senator for Antwerp in 1949 and served as parliamentary leader in the Senate from 1964 to 1971. He also served as a Member of the European Parliament from 1958 to 1971 and President of the European Parliament from 1965 to 1966. He died in Leuven in 1971.

== Bibliography ==
- Boehme, O. (1999). "Tussen de Fronten: Het Jong-conservatisme van Victor Leemans". Wetenschappelijke Tijdingen. 58 (1): 131–53.

Preceded by Jean Duvieusart	President of the European Parliament; 24 September 1965 – 7 March 1966	Succeeded by Alain Poher
