= Committee of Secretaries-General =

Belgian collaborationist group in WWII

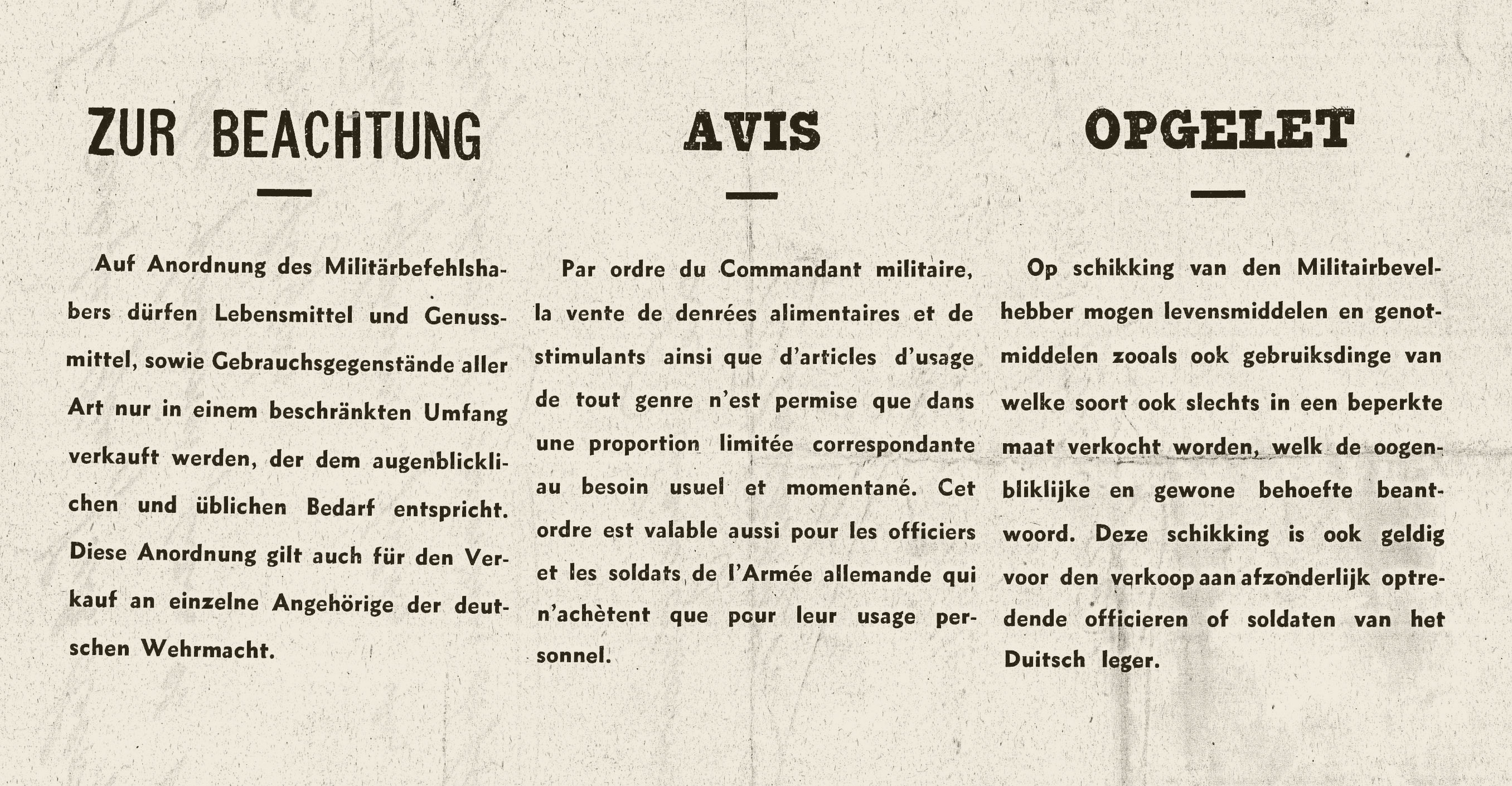
Trilingual proclamation concerning rationing in Belgium, directly ordered by the German Military Administration.

The Committee of Secretaries-General (French: Comité des Sécretaires-généraux; Dutch: Comité van de secretarissen-generaal) was a committee of senior civil servants and technocrats in German-occupied Belgium during World War II. It was formed shortly before the occupation to oversee the continued functioning of the civil service and state bureaucracy independently of the German military occupation administration.

The Committee formed an integral part of the policy of "lesser evil" (moindre mal) collaboration in which Belgian officials were required to seek compromises with German military demands in order to maintain a degree of administrative autonomy. It comprised the Secretaries-General of each of the major government departments. However, the German administration began to introduce new members from August 1940 including those such as Victor Leemans and Gérard Romsée who were sympathetic to authoritarianism. They helped to facilitate the more radical administrative reforms demanded by the Germans, although the Committee refused to involve itself in the deportation of Belgian Jews. As the visible face of the German administration, the Committee became more and more unpopular as the war progressed. Several of its members were prosecuted for collaboration after the Liberation of Belgium in September 1944 but several, including Leemans, subsequently pursued political careers in post-war Belgium.

== Background ==
The committee was installed by the Belgian government of Hubert Pierlot on 16 May 1940 as an administrative committee to oversee the basic functioning of the Belgian state in the absence of the official government. While the ministers departed for Bordeaux in France, the Secretaries-General (chief civil servants responsible for each department) of each ministry were ordered to remain in the country, along with all other civil servants, to allow the state to continue functioning.

The Committee formed part of the policy of officially sanctioned "lesser evil" collaboration among the civil service and government bureaus left behind. (Note: The basis of the policy of lesser-evil ("Moindre-mal") was that continued control over state functions and the normal operation of the government was the best way to preserve Belgian interests. The same policy formed the basis of the Galopin doctrine, which allowed limited collaboration in order to avoid potential German reprisals or post-war industrial decline.)

== Purpose and role ==
During the German occupation of Belgium in World War I, many Belgian workers had refused to work for the German administration as a form of passive resistance. This had led to large-scale reprisals against civilians as the occupiers had attempted to enforce their policies by armed force.

The Committee hoped to avoid the Germans becoming involved in the day-to-day administration of the territory as they had during World War I, while also allowing Belgium to maintain a degree of national autonomy and independence. The committee also hoped to be able to prevent the implementation of more radical German policies, like forced labor and deportation. The legal basis of the committee was a law of 7 September 1939, through which in times of crisis, a secretary-general could exert full control over his own department, but without having the full status of being a minister.

=== Place within the German administration ===
After the Belgian surrender on 28 May 1940, the Germans formed a Militärverwaltung (Military Administration) in the country; commanded by the German aristocrat and career soldier, General Alexander von Falkenhausen. A section of the administration called the Militärverwaltungsstab (Military Administrative Staff), commanded by SS-Gruppenführer Eggert Reeder, was responsible for the day-to-day civil administration of the territory. The Militärverwaltungsstab would present its demands to the Secretaries-General, even though the committee was separate, in order to have them carried out.

== Composition ==
The original committee of five was installed after the departure of the government in May 1940. In August 1940, they were joined by a further five new Secretaries-General representing other ministries. In early 1941, there was a reshuffle, replacing many of the original members. The 1941 reshuffle introduced more pro-Germans into the committee, such as Gérard Romsée who was a noted member of the pro-Nazi Vlaams Nationaal Verbond (VNV) party.

Original committee

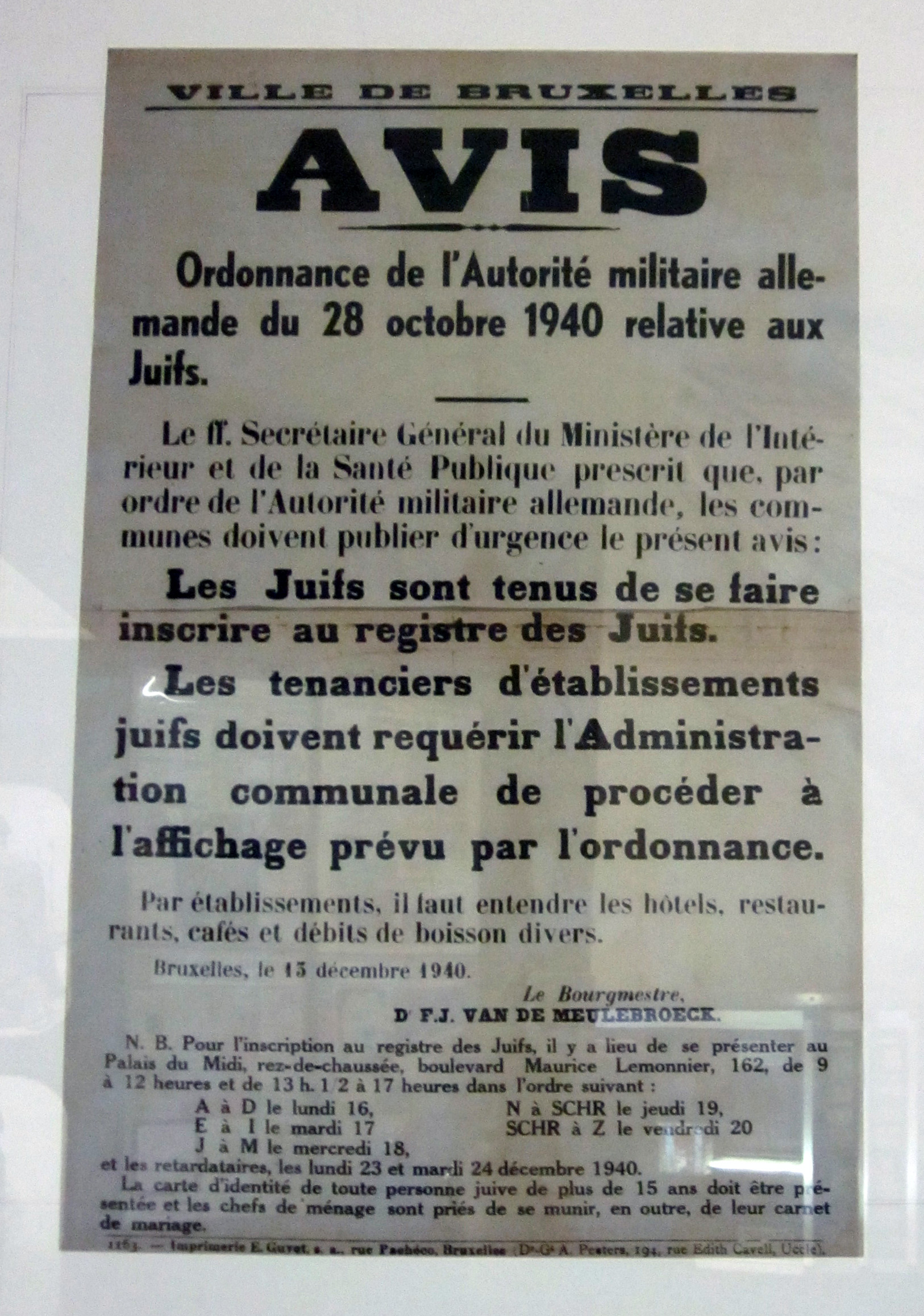
October 1940 poster detailing German anti-Jewish Laws in Belgium. The Secretary-General of the Interior and Public Health is named for decreeing the publication of the poster in government buildings, even though the committee refused to assist in the writing and enforcement of the laws.

| Name | Ministry |
|---|---|
| Alexandre Delmer | President of the committee; Public Works (Dismissed 31 March 1941) |
| Jean Vossen | Internal Affairs |
| Marcel Nyns | Public Education |
| Oscar Plisnier | Finance (President of the committee from 4 April 1941) |
| Charles Verwilghen | Work and Social Security (Dismissed 20 March 1942) |

August 1940 additions

| Name | Ministry |
|---|---|
| Ernst de Bunswyck | Justice |
| Emile De Winter | Agriculture |
| Victor Leemans | Economic Affairs |
| A. Castau | Transport and PTT |
| Édouard De Jonghe | Colonies |

1941 reshuffle

| Name | Ministry |
|---|---|
| Gérard Romsée | Internal Affairs |
| Gaston Schuind | Justice (Dismissed in September 1943) |
| A. De Cock | Public Works |
| G. Claeys | Transport |
| M. Van Hecke | Colonies |

== Policies ==
Throughout 1940 the Secretaries-General continued to follow their "policy of lesser-evils", influenced by the Galopin doctrine, in the hope that the occupiers would respect the protocol established at the Hague Conventions of 1907.

From the summer of 1940, the Committee became increasingly divided between the members keen for closer collaboration with the Germans, led by Victor Leemans, and those who wished to remain strictly within the proscribed Belgian legal framework, led by Ernst de Bunswyck. In October 1940, the Germans were able to pass fundamental changes to the system of regional Burgomasters in the country though the Committee without resistance. The committee had announced in October 1940 that it would refuse to enforce anti-Jewish legislation, but did not resist their implementation by the military government. The committee's ambivalent stance meant that Belgian policemen and civil servants were not instructed to refuse to participate in rounding-up of Jews as part of the Final Solution from 1942. Tensions grew between the Germans and the committee in December 1940, and in early 1941 the Germans reshuffled the committee; appointing more pro-Nazi members. From March 1941, it became clear that the committee would no longer be able to resist German demands, even those clearly violating the Hague Convention.

From 1942, collaborationist members of the committee were able to further their policies. In Internal Affairs, Romsée began encouraging an overtly collaborationist policy in his department, encouraging Burgomaster positions to be given to pro-Nazi members of the right-wing Rex and VNV parties in Wallonia and Flanders respectively. Many existing Burgomasters were dismissed on a variety of pretexts in order to clear the path for the new candidates. He also appointed the pro-German Emiel Van Coppenolle (also a friend of Romsée) to the head of the Belgian police service. These measures gave the pro-German members of the Committee direct control over the country's local government, its police force and security service. At the same time, Leemans encouraged the merger of various "Central offices" to co-ordinate industries (along lines of the pre-war Gleichschaltung in Germany) and greater economic integration into the Großraumwirtschaft (Greater Economy) and Nazi Germany. Other members of the committee were also responsible for creating other groupings, like the Office National de Travail (ONT; National Office for Work) which would be used for coordinating the deportation of Belgian workers to factories in Germany from October 1942.

In October 1942, the Germans began to implement compulsory deportation of Belgian workers to work in German factories. The introduction of the policy, which had been imposed in World War I and which the committee had hoped to avoid at all costs, marked the last blow to the committee's influence.

Legislation decreed the Secretaries-General are known as "Arrêtés" (Rulings), whereas those decreed by the Military Administration directly are entitled "Ordonnances" (Orders).

== Criticism ==
Despite its aims, the committee was in large part responsible for the ease with which the Germans could implement their policies in Belgium and was unable to moderate many German policies, such as deportation of workers to Germany (though delayed to October 1942) or the persecution of Jews. In particular, encouraging the Germans to delegate tasks to the Committee meant that the Germans were effectively using the established national civil service, which allowed much more efficient implementation than could have been achieved by force. Since Belgium was also dependent on Germany for the imports of food it needed, the committee was always at a disadvantage during negotiations.

The committee was heavily criticised by the Belgian government in exile in London for aiding the Germans. The Secretaries-General were also unpopular within Belgium itself. In 1942, the journalist Paul Struye described them as "the object of growing and almost unanimous unpopularity." As the face of the German occupation authority, they also became unpopular with the public, which blamed them for the German demands they were implementing.

After the war, several of the Secretaries-General were tried for collaboration with the occupants. Most were acquitted after basic examination. Romsée (Secretary-General for Internal Affairs) was sentenced to 20 years imprisonment and Schuind (responable for Justice) was sentenced to five years. Many of the former Secretaries-General went on to careers in politics after the war. Both De Winter and Leemans served as senators for the centre-right Christian Social Party (PSC-CVP) and Leemans ended his career as President of the European Parliament.

== See also ==
- Administrative Council (Norway) – a similar body in German-occupied Norway
- Hans Hirschfeld - a Dutch civil servant who pursued a similar path in the German-occupied Netherlands
- Belgium in World War II
- King Leopold III
