= Maarten Rudelsheim =

Dutch-Belgian flamingant (1873–1920)

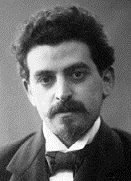
Maarten Rudelsheim

Maarten Rudelsheim (25 April 1873 in Amsterdam – 10 September 1920 in Antwerp) was a flamingant of Jewish-Dutch descent.

Rudelsheim was born in the Netherlands, of a Jewish father and a Dutch mother. In 1885, the family came to Antwerp. Maarten Rudelsheim studied at Ghent University and became Doctor of German philology. In 1898, Maarten Rudelsheim was naturalized as a Belgian citizen. In 1900, he became assistant librarian in Antwerp. Like Louis Franck, Nico Gunzburg and Lon Landau, Maarten Rudelsheim was one of a number of Jewish flamingants who were engaged in the Flemish movement. He devoted himself to the Dutchification of Ghent University, then still a French-speaking university in a Flemish city. After the war, Rudelsheim was condemned to ten years' imprisonment for involvement in activism during the war. He died in Antwerp prison in 1920.

== Sources ==
- Rudelsheim’s biography
