= Walter Ganshof van der Meersch =

Belgian jurist, lawyer, and bobsledder

Walter Jean Ganshof van der Meersch
Personal information
- Nationality: Belgian
- Born: 18 May 1900 Bruges, Belgium
- Died: 12 September 1993 (aged 93) Tintange, Belgium

Sport
- Sport: Bobsleigh

Walter Jean Ganshof van der Meersch (18 May 1900 – 12 September 1993) was a Belgian jurist and lawyer. He competed in the four-man bobsledding event at the 1928 Winter Olympics. During the German invasion of Belgium a number of people suspected of being hostile to the state were arrested on his orders and later murdered in what became known as the Abbeville massacre.
