= Joris Van Severen =

Belgian politician

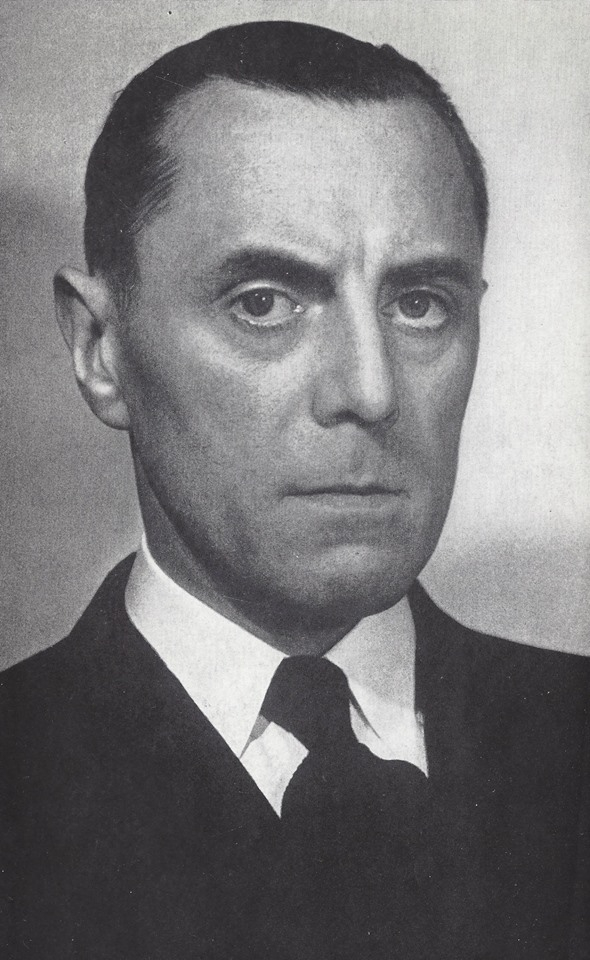
- Joris Van Severen
- Born: Georges Edmond Eduard Van Severen; 19 July 1894; Wakken, West Flanders, Belgium
- Died: 20 May 1940 (aged 45); Abbeville, Hauts-de-France, France
- Cause of death: Execution by firing squad
- Education: Law degree
- Alma mater: University of Ghent
- Occupation: Politician
- Political party: Frontpartij; Verdinaso

Joris Van Severen (19 July 1894 – 20 May 1940) was a Belgian politician and ideologue of the Flemish Movement as well as a Pan-Netherlander. A leading figure of pre-World War II Flemish nationalism, he co-founded the extreme-right group Verdinaso.

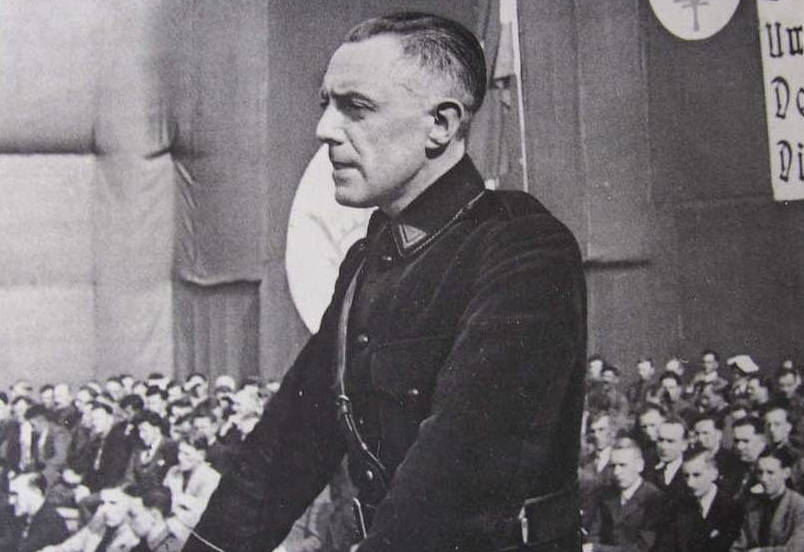
Van Severen delivering a speech

== Early years ==
Van Severen was born in the Flemish town of Wakken as Georges Edmond Eduard Van Severen. His family was Flemish but, in keeping with a number of leading Flemings, spoke the French language and as such were given the derogatory nickname Fransquillon by Dutch speakers. Van Severen's father was a prominent lawyer who also served as mayor of Wakken. Van Severen was educated by Jesuits in the Sint-Barbaracollege, who taught in French, before studying law at the University of Ghent.

Following the outbreak of the First World War Van Severen was called up to the Belgian Army. Initially a sergeant, he was promoted to second lieutenant in January 1917. While in the army Van Severen became part of the Front Beweging, a secret Flemish nationalist group active within the Belgian Army, and also wrote an open letter to King Albert calling for greater autonomy for Flanders. The letter, which was the work of Van Severen and other intellectual soldiers such as Corporal Adiel de Beuckelaere, included calls for internal self-government and a separate Flemish Army. When this was discovered Van Severen was interrogated by Military Police about his Flemish nationalist activities and after informing them that he supported the terms of the letter he was sentenced to eight days of house arrest. His ultimate punishment was to be demoted back into the ranks in June 1918.

== Political development ==
Already involved in the Flemish Movement, Van Severen began to develop his own wider ideology and world view. Towards the end of the war he became a convinced Russophile and reacted positively towards the Russian Revolution. He combined this with a strong Germanophobia, dismissing Germany as "a gang of bandits with no soul". Alongside this he had a strong faith in the Roman Catholic Church, and in particular admired the Catholic authors Léon Bloy and Albrecht Rodenbach, who was also an important figure of inspiration for the Flemish Movement. His ideas began to take shape in the journal Ons Vaterland, which Van Severen and other like-minded soldiers produced from the front.

Demobilised after the war, Van Severen returned to his studies at Ghent University, where he was chosen as president of the General Flemish Student Union. In 1921 he became editor of the journal Ter Waarheid and in this role his ideological outlook developed further as he shifted to the right. Although he had always been a nationalist Van Severen had held some respect for international socialism but by the early 1920s had abandoned this position in favour of a harder-edged nationalist Jacobinism.

== Frontpartij ==
The only major political outlet for Flemish nationalism after the First World War was the Frontpartij and Van Severen duly joined this group. A candidate for the Roeselare-Tielt seat in the 1921 general election he was successful in gaining election to the Belgian Chamber of Representatives that year. As a member of the Chamber he supported a policy of "flemicization", encouraging the appointment of Flemings to leading roles in the judiciary, government, armed forces and other public institutions. As a parliamentarian he gained a reputation as a fiery and committed polemicist although he would lose interest and simply read passages from Charles Péguy in the Chamber instead of making speeches. His shift to the right continued apace as his most admired political philosophers became Maurice Barrès and Charles Maurras.

Van Severen lost his seat in the 1929 general election by a technicality despite gaining more votes than his opponent, by then publicly expressing admiration for Benito Mussolini and Italian fascism, he established his own journal, Jong Dietschland. In this he argued for the establishment of an independent 'Greater Netherlands' in which Dutch people, Flemings, Frisians and Luxembourgers would unite in a new "Dietsch" state. Although his plan proved popular amongst the students at Ghent, with whom he still held strong influence, the bulk of the Frontpartij membership, who were mainly war veterans, did not embrace the plan and the party's official newspaper De Schelde decried fascism.

== Verdinaso ==
With his plans having been rejected by the Frontpartij in October 1931, he broke away from that group to establish his party, Verdinaso. Containing only 169 members on its foundation, the party was committed to a form of corporatism that Van Severen called national-solidarism as well as to integral nationalism. At its foundation, it supported Flemish separatism, but before long, the group, which was far right, supported the Dietsch option. Van Severen advocated the use of force to take over the existing Belgium and then to establish the Greater Belgian state that he supported. He also advocated anti-parliamentarism, something that had been strengthened by his defeat in 1929, during which he felt moderates in the Frontpartij had deliberately sabotaged his re-election. His vision would eventually expand to that of the Dietsche Rijk which, rather than splitting Flanders off from Belgium to form the new state, advocated the practical union of the Benelux countries into a single entity. The change was brought about in part by Van Severen "discovering" in 1934 that the Walloons, like the Flemings, were descended from the Franks.

To get his ideas off the ground, Van Severen attempted to come to agreements with other far-right movements, notably Rex and the Flemish National Union. Still, he was not successful in these endeavours. His movement adopted many of the trappings of other European fascist movements, such as the political uniform, Roman salute, Führerprinzip and stormtroopers (initially called Dinaso Militie before a 1934 name change to Dinaso Militanten Order), although Van Severen was unenthusiastic about the development of fascism, preferring to look back to the more conservative far-right ideology of Action Française. He was particular unimpressed by Nazism, with Bertrand de Jouvenel quoting Van Severen as saying "I detest the Hitlerians".

== Death ==
Following the outbreak of the Second World War, Van Severen issued an order proscribing the production of any pro-Nazi literature by members of Verdinaso. Nevertheless, on 9 May 1940, immediately prior to Fall Gelb, Van Severen was one of a number of far right and far left activists arrested. The arrested men were put under the care of the French Army and stationed near Abbeville. On 20 May, when the advancing German Army cut off the area, a group of French soldiers carried out a massacre and killed a number of members of Verdinaso, Rex and the Belgian Communist Party, among them Van Severen. Twenty one suspects of varying political stripe were selected and executed without trial.

With Van Severen dead, Verdinaso fell apart, with some activists falling into collaboration with the German occupation forces and others following his non-Nazi example by joining the resistance.
