= Greater Belgium =

Belgian irredentist concept

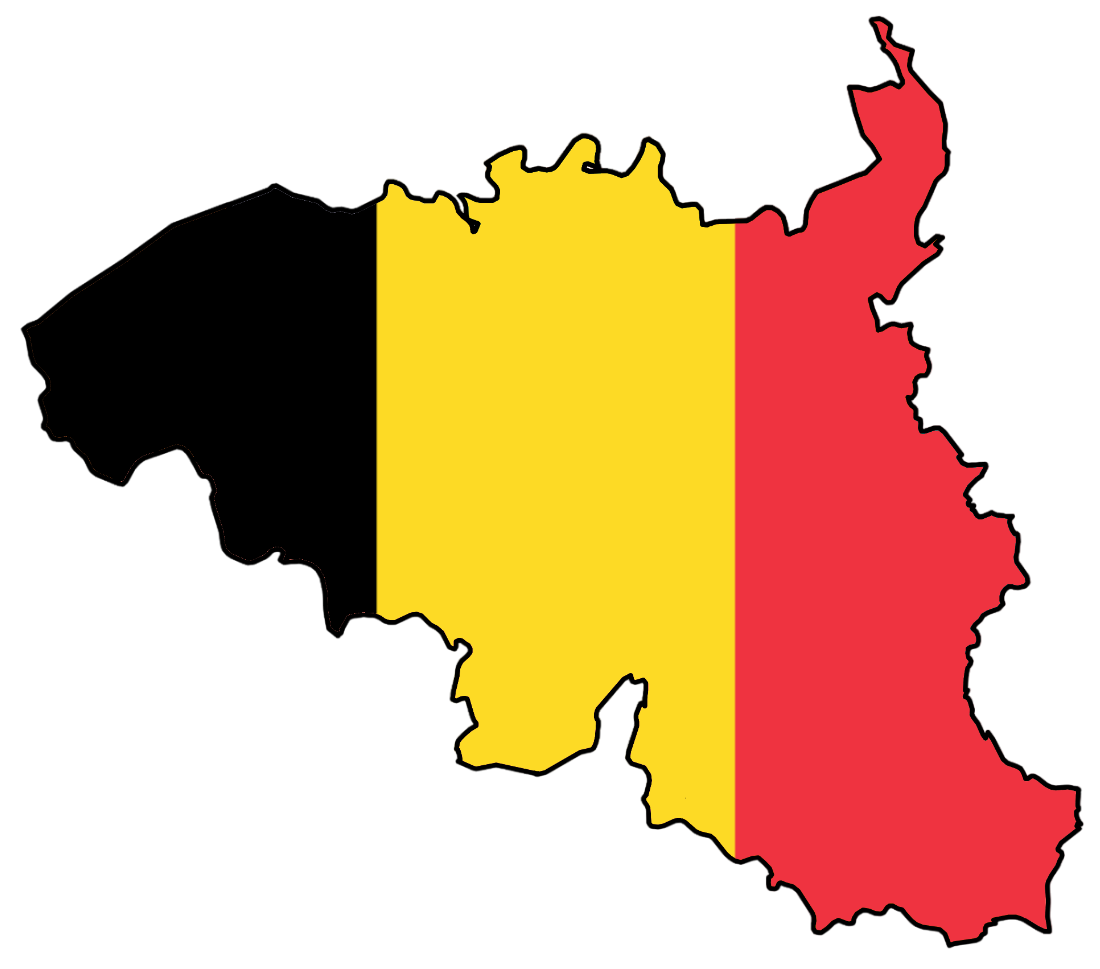
Flagmap of Greater Belgium (Belgium + Zeelandic Flanders, Limburg and Luxembourg)

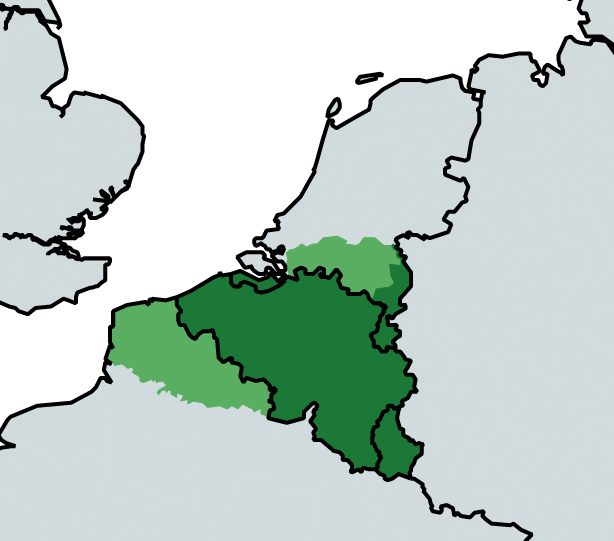
Greater Belgium (less common claims in light green)

Greater Belgium (French: Plus Grande Belgique, Dutch: Groter België) is a Belgian irredentist concept which lays claim on territory nationalists deem as rightfully Belgian. It usually laid claim to: German territory historically belonging to the former Duchy of Limburg (Eupen-Malmedy), Dutch Limburg, Zeelandic Flanders, and the Grand Duchy of Luxembourg. To a lesser degree, they also claimed the Dutch province of North Brabant and the French Netherlands (Nord-Pas-de-Calais). Shortly after the Belgian Revolution, some groups even proposed a Belgo-Rhine federation. Nowadays, belief in Belgian irredentism is very uncommon and overshadowed by talk of partitioning Belgium or the incorporation of Flanders into the Netherlands (see Greater Netherlands).

== History ==
=== Belgian Revolution ===
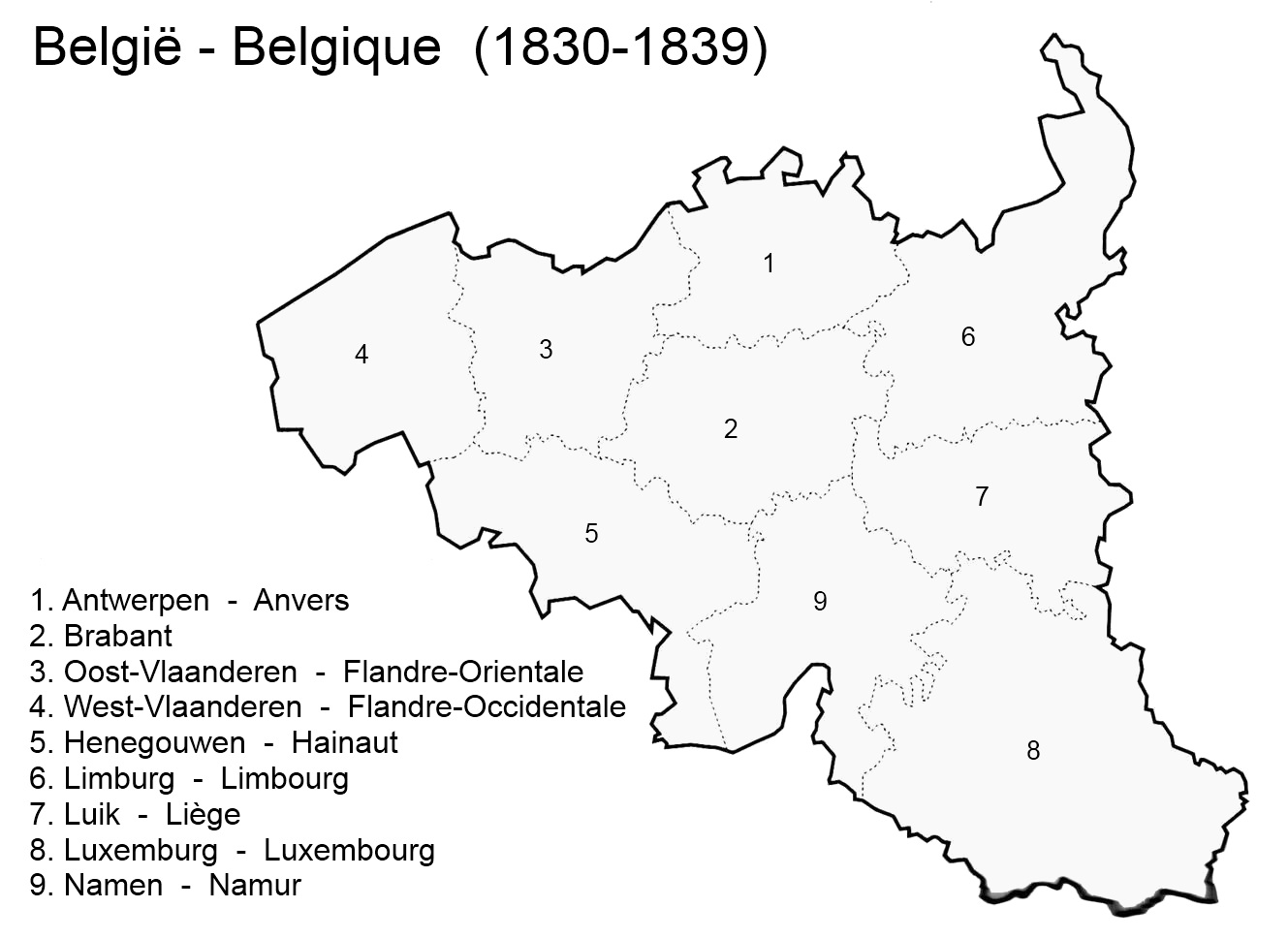
Belgium between 1830 and 1839

When the Belgian state became de facto independent from the Netherlands in 1830, it initially also encompassed eastern Limburg (except for Dutch-occupied Maastricht) and eastern Luxembourg (except for Prussian-occupied Luxembourg City). The young state also claimed North Brabant and Zeelandic Flanders, but was unable to conquer this territory. In 1839, Belgium's borders were officially recognised, but it had to give up eastern Limburg and Luxembourg. Afterwards, some Belgians fought to retake these territories. Even King Leopold II made plans to invade the north.

=== The Great War ===
After World War I, Belgian irredentism became relevant again as the claims were seen as reparation. The Belgians viewed the Netherlands' actions during this war as collaboration, and because of this, the Belgian state claimed Zeelandic Flanders and Dutch Limburg once again. After negotiations, Belgium only gained the German territory of Eupen-Malmedy through the Treaty of Versailles. This could be seen as the first and only success the Belgian irredentists achieved on the European continent.

In 1919, Luxembourg held a referendum which could have led to a Belgian on the throne, but this was rejected by its population. However, Belgium and Luxembourg did create an Economic Union shortly afterwards, which led to greater economic collaboration.

After World War II, Belgium again annexed a few German border regions, although it returned most of them in 1958, keeping only the towns of Losheimergraben (Büllingen) and Leykaul (Bütgenbach).

== See also ==
- Luxembourg Crisis
- Belgian colonial empire
- Greater Netherlands
- Rattachism – a movement in Wallonia aiming for unification with France
