= Flamingant =

The term flamingant, in both Dutch and French, refers to an adherent of the Flemish Movement. Originating as a pejorative term use by Belgian nationalists, it may be equally used as an adjective or substantive and the term flamingantisme is sometimes used to designate their ideology. The term may be derived from Flamins, the Walloon word for Flemings. The word wallingant is similarly used to describe adherents of the Walloon Movement which also gives rise to the comparable term wallingantisme.

The flamingant movement was originally initiated by the priests in Flanders under the French occupation after 1792. The secular republic invaded the Austrian Netherlands three years later, retaining them until 1815. This was very badly received in the Catholic provinces, alarming the clergy and damaging those economic sectors which were in competition with metropolitan France. Thus all the Walloon vineyards were ruined and the textile sector in Flanders went into decay. The French language, which had been the language of the leisured classes under feudalism, was imposed throughout the administration.

With the fall of the French Empire in 1815, the movement became dormant. In 1830, Belgians of the north, alongside those of the south, overthrew Dutch rule uniting behind their common Roman Catholic religion and distrust of the Dutch government. The choice of the French language for the young Belgian nation seemed natural, as French-speaking citizens formed the majority of the revolutionaries and was a language spoken by the aristocracy across the country. The word flamingant remains a loaded term. For example, see the song Les Flamingants by Jacques Brel criticizing the flamingants.

== Notable Flamingants ==
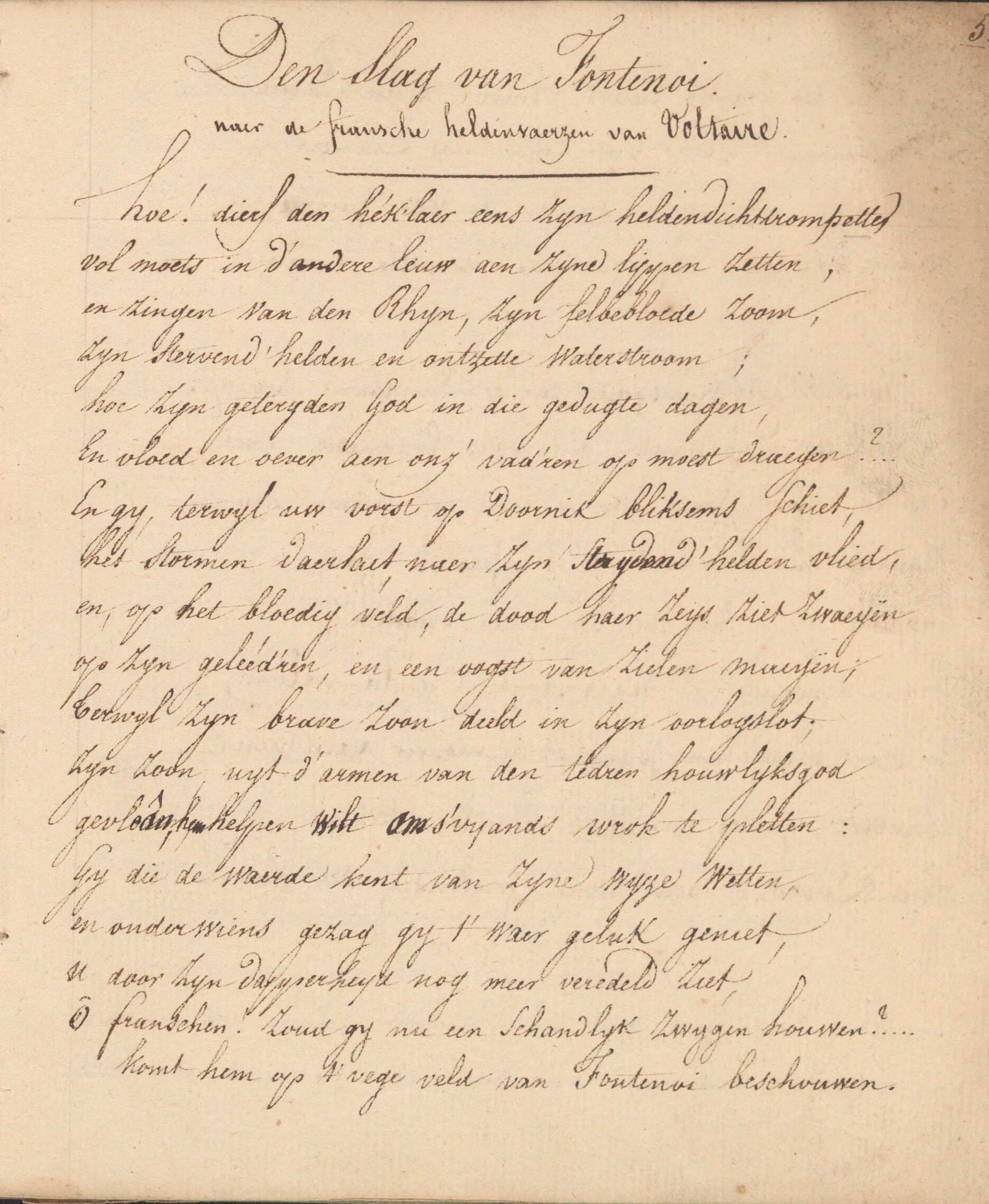
Excerpt from the manuscript Poetic Works, 1807–1815. The work contains many political poems. Written by Jan Frans Willems.

- Jan Derk Domela Nieuwenhuis Nyegaard
- Maarten Rudelsheim
- Lodewijk Scharpé
- Jef Turf
- Prudens van Duyse
- Jan Frans Willems

== See also ==
- Flemish Movement
