= Paul van Ostaijen =

Belgian poet and writer (1896 – 1928)

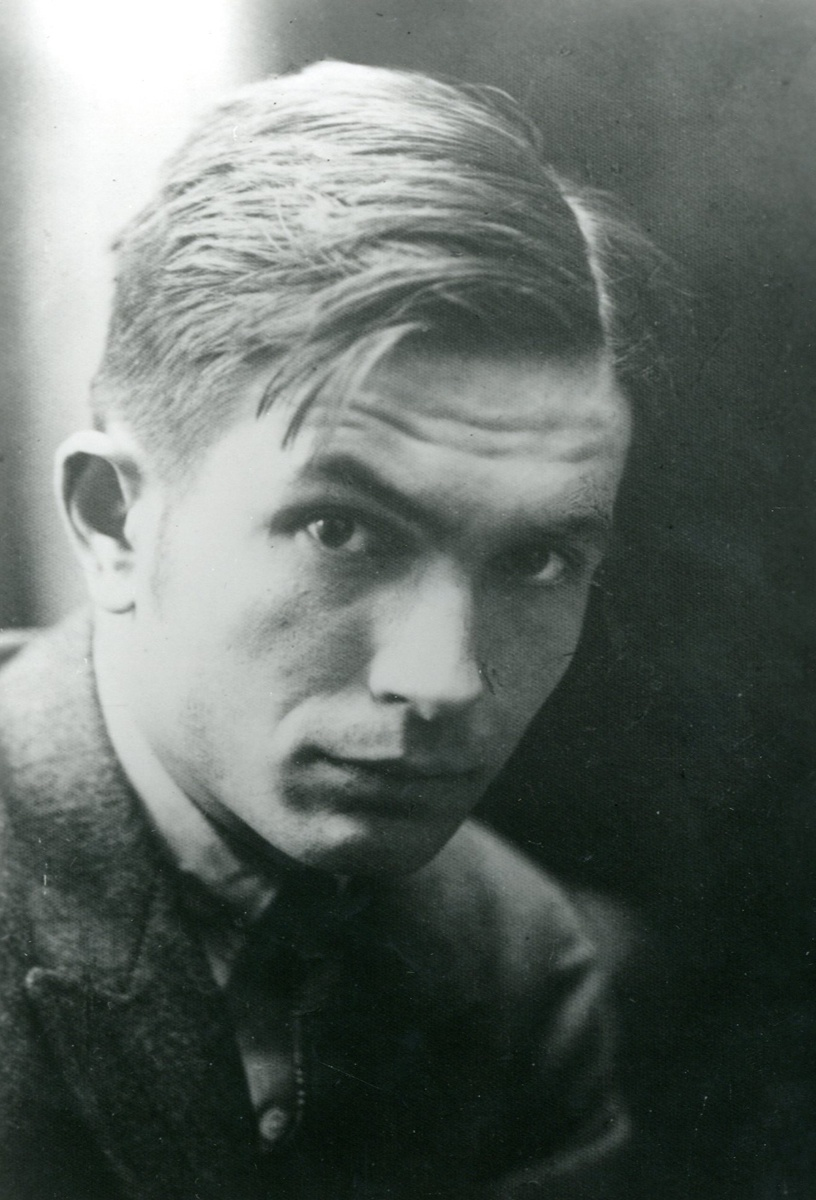
- Paul van Ostaijen
- Born: 22 February 1896; Antwerp, Belgium
- Died: 18 March 1928 (aged 32); Miavoye-Anthée, Belgium
- Occupations: poet, writer

Paul van Ostaijen (22 February 1896 – 18 March 1928) was a Belgian Dutch-language poet and writer.

== Nickname ==
Van Ostaijen was born in Antwerp to a Dutch father and Flemish mother. His nickname was Mister 1830, derived from his habit of walking along the streets of Antwerp clothed as a dandy from that year.

His poetry shows influences from Modernism, Expressionism, Dadaism and early Surrealism, but Van Ostaijen's style is very much his own.

== Flamingant ==
Van Ostaijen was an active flamingant, a supporter of Flemish independence. Because of his involvement with Flemish activism aligned with the "Flamenpolitik" of the German occupation of Belgium in World War I, he had to flee to Berlin after the war. In Berlin—one of the centers of Dadaism and Expressionism—he met many other artists. He also struggled through a severe mental crisis.

Upon returning to Belgium, Van Ostaijen opened an art gallery in Brussels. He died of tuberculosis in 1928 in a sanatorium in Miavoye-Anthée, in the Wallonian Ardennes.

The Czech poet Ivan Wernisch was so impressed by "the genius of van Ostaijen" that he learned Dutch to be able to translate him. His translations were published as Tanec gnómů, Dance of the gnomes, in 1990.

== Poetry ==
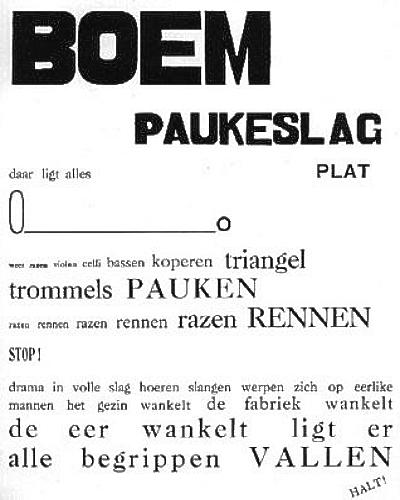
Boem paukeslag, one of Van Ostaijen's most famous poems

- Music hall (1916)
- Het sienjaal (The signal, 1918)
- Bezette stad (Occupied city, 1921)
- De Feesten van Angst en Pijn (Feasts of Fear and Agony, written 1921, published posthumously)
- Nagelaten gedichten (Posthumous poems, published posthumously in 1928)

== Other publications ==
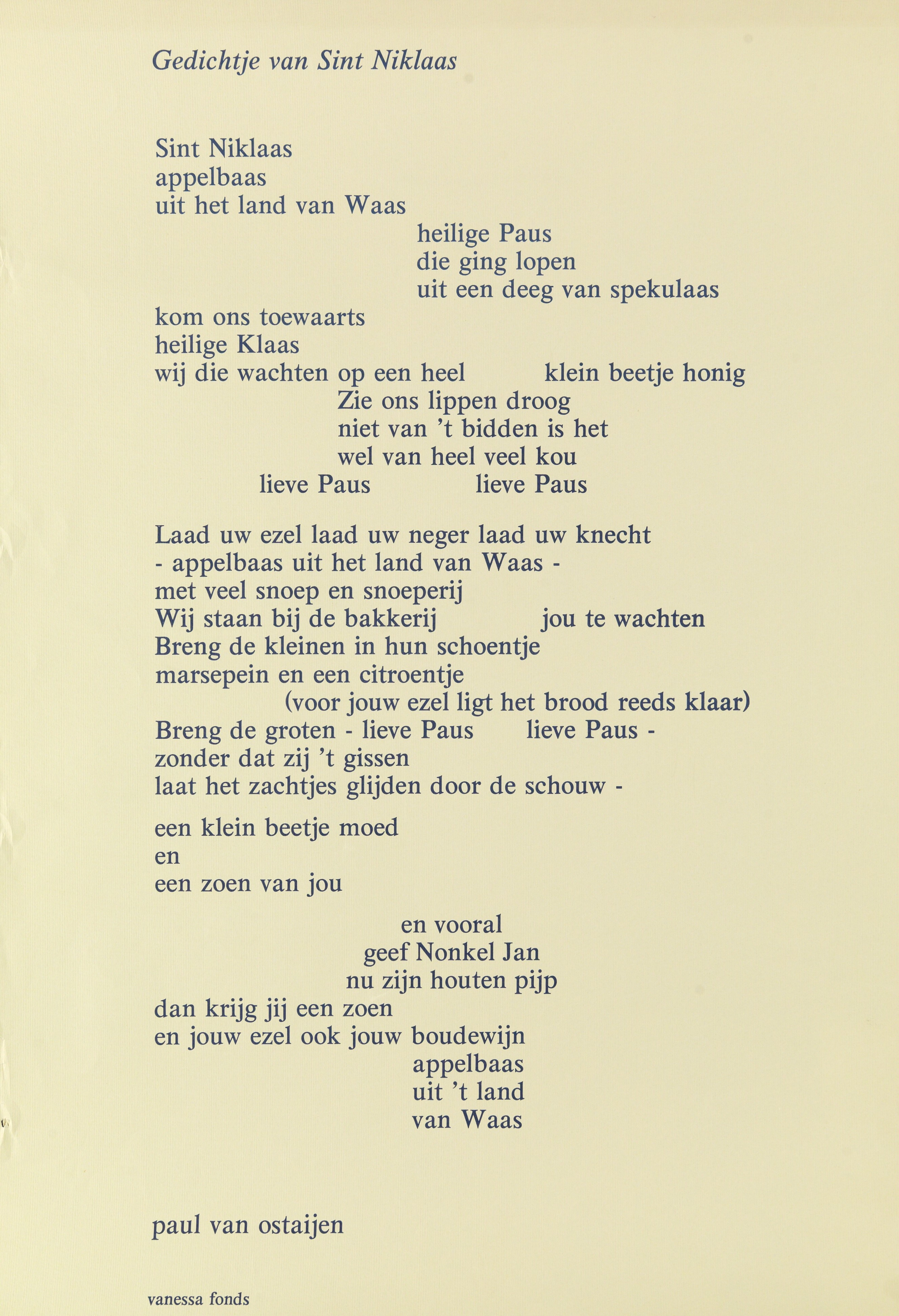
- Poster with the poem "Little poem for Sint Niklaas". Written bij Paul van Ostaijen.
  De trust der vaderlandsliefde (The trust of patriotism, 1925, grotesques)
- Gebruiksaanwijzing der lyriek (Manual of lyrics, 1926, lecture)
- Het bordeel van Ika Loch (Ika Loch's brothel, 1926, grotesques)
- De bende van de stronk (The stump gang, 1932, grotesques)

== See also ==
- Flemish literature
