= Karel Jonckheere =

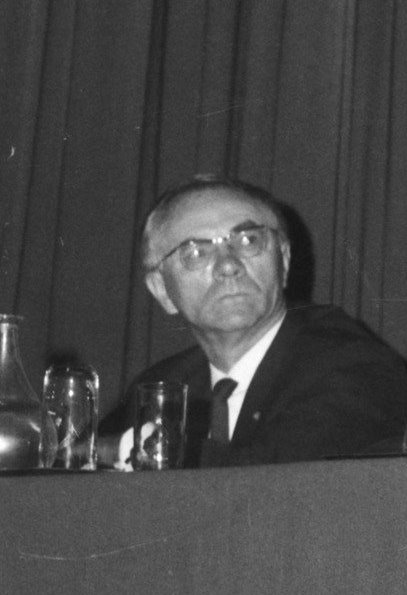
Karel Jonckheere in 1965

Karel Jonckheere as Carolus Joannes Baptista Jonckheere (Ostend, 9 April 1906 – Rijmenam, 13 December 1993) was a Flemish writer and critic. Widely traveled, he was inspired by his journeys for his poems and novels.

== Biography ==
=== Family origins and childhood ===
Karel Jonckheere was born in Ostend in the fishing district, Kamiel Jonckheere and Victorine de Clercq. He went to school at the Royal Athenaeum in Ostend, where he attended the science high school (human sciences). Then he went to Ghent and attended the Reichstageable Normal School to become a teacher for secondary education in Germanic languages.

=== Career ===
==== National Education ====
He began his professional career as a clerk in Ostend. In 1929, he began his teaching career, first at Gembloux High School, then in 1930, in Nieuwpoort and finally in 1944 in Ghent.

==== Belgian Ministry of the Interior ====
In 1945, he was secretary of the Belgian Minister of the Interior and the same year, director of Veurne State High School. In 1946 he was appointed inspector of public libraries. In 1953, he became an official at the Ministry of National Education and Culture.

== Bibliography ==
=== Books ===
- Gedichten (1942)
- De verwachte (story from Steekspel met dubbelgangers) (in Meesters der Nederlandse vertelkunst, 1949)
- De kolibri fluistert : indiaanse sprookjes (1951)
- Vertellen onder te toverboom : naar Maya-sprookjes (1953)
- Nacht?, zei de zon, nooit van gehoord (1967)
- Spaans schetsbroek : dertig coplas (1968)
- Met Elisabeth naar de golf (1971, reisverhaal)
- Sleutelbos op Gaston Burssens (1972)
- Kinderen met de krekelstem (1976)
- Vraag me geen leugens (1986)
- Wuiven naar gisteren (1987)
- Alice Nahon, schetsentoets bij haar beeld (1991)
- Niemand moet me helpen sterven (maar eenieder mag me leren leven) (1992)

=== Novels ===
- Brozens Anny (1932)
- Cargo (1940)
- Tierra caliente (1941)
- Tita vlucht (1942)
- De zevende haven (1942)
- Steekspel met dubbelgangers (1944)
- Kongo zonder buks of boy (1957)
- Kongo met het blote oog (1958)
- De vogels hebben het gezien (1968)
- Oostende verteld (1970)
- De man met de ruiker (1977)
- Verbannen in het vaderland (1978)

=== Poems ===
- Proefvlucht (1933)
- Het witte zeil (1935)
- Gewijde grond (1937)
- Klein testament (1938)
- Conchita (1939)
- Wat niet geneest (1943)
- Onvoorzien programma (1944)
- Avondbrieven (1946)
- Spiegel der zee (1946)
- Vloedlijn (1948)
- De hondenwacht (1951)
- Van zee tot schelp (1955)
- Verzamelde poems (1956)
- Ogentroost (1961)
- Grenzen van papier en pijn (1963)
- Roemeense suite (1965)
- De ring van de boon (1966)
- Ik had die man kunnen zijn (1969)
- In de wandeling lichaam geheten (1969)
- Poëtische inventaris (1973)
- Mijn gouden leesboek ABC (1974)
- Na-zicht (1976)
- Miniaturen (1979)
- Beatrijs (1980)
- De overkant is hier (1981)
- Was het maar bij deze woorden gebleven (1983)
- Recht op da capo (1988)

=== Essay ===
- Bertus Aafjes, de dichter van de poëzie (1953)
- Van kritiek gesproken (1955)
- Poëzie en experiment (1956)
- De poëziemuur doorbreken (1958)
- De Vlaamse letteren vandaag (1958)
- De literatuur van de Nederlanden in de moderne tijd (1959)
- Raymond Brulez (1961)
- Ondergang en dageraad (1966)
- Een hart onder de dierenriem (1967)
- De literatuur in België (1968 met Roger Bodart)
- Leer mij ze kennen... de Vlamingen (1969)
- Denkend aan de Nederlanden (1970)
- In een anekdtoe betrapt (1971)
- Toon mij hoe je schrijft (1972)
- Omer K. de Laey (1976)
- De Kongo van Floris Jespers (1984)
- Herinneringen aan Ensor (1985)

=== Anthology ===
- Poëzie is overal. Van bijbel tot eskimo (1960)
- Gemini (1960)
- Kongo het woord (1961)
- Firmin Van Hecke (1962)
- Uit het nest geroofd (1962)
- Groot verzenboek voor al wie jong van hart is (1978)
- Brevarium der Vlaamse lyriek (1979)

=== Others ===
- Ik heb eens... (1962, radio reading)
- Filter uw dag (1970, aphoristic prose)
- De zwangere stopnaald (1972, aphoristic prose)
- Waar plant ik mijn ezel (1974, autobiography)
- Halve zolen en achterlappen (1974, aphoristic prose)
- Boeketje Buysse, een levenschets en een bibliografisch overzicht (1974)
- Mijn dochter wordt sirene (1976, autobiography)
- Ook ik, zelfs gij, vooral wij (1976, quotes)
- Van den vos Reynaerde (1979, adaptation)
- De kroon en de muze (1991, article)

== See also ==
- Flemish literature

== Sources ==
- Karel Jonckheere
- poems
