= 1914–15 Scottish Districts season =

Rugby union competition

- Countries: Scotland
- Date: 1914–15
- Matches played: 1

The 1914–15 Scottish Districts season is a record of all the rugby union matches for Scotland's district teams.

== History ==
There was no Inter-City match this year due to the First World War.

Schools matches continued this season; but the vast majority of District matches were cancelled due to the war.

One district match that was played - against the 4th battalion of the King's Own Scottish Borderers - was a charity match for the Belgian Relief Fund.

== Results ==
Date	Try	Conversion	Penalty	Dropped goal	Goal from mark	Notes
1905–1947	3 points	2 points	3 points	4 points	3 points	

=== Inter-City ===
None.

=== Other Scottish matches ===
10 October 1914

King's Own Scottish Borderers, 4th Battalion	3 – 8	South of Scotland District
	Report

Mansfield Park, Hawick
Referee: Adam Turnbull

KOSB:
South of Scotland District:

=== English matches ===
No other District matches played.

=== International matches ===
No touring matches this season.
