= Jules Mees =

Belgian professor of historical geography

Juliaan or Jules Mees (1876–1937) was a Belgian professor of historical geography, a specialist on the Portuguese discoveries, who in 1920 was condemned to two years in prison for collaboration during the German occupation of Belgium in World War I.

== Life ==
Mees was born in Hingene, Province of Antwerp (Belgium) on 26 September 1876. After secondary education at the Onze-Lieve-Vrouwcollege in Boom, Belgium he studied history at Ghent University, graduating Ph.D. in 1899 with a thesis on the discovery of the Azores Islands. In 1900-1902 he pursued further studies in economic history and historical geography at the universities of Munich and Vienna, and in 1902-1903 taught at a state secondary school in Ghent. In 1903 he obtained a position in the State Archives. He also taught at the École Supérieure Commerciale et Consulaire in Mons. In 1917 he accepted a position at the German-sponsored Vlaamsche Hogeschool (Von Bissing university). In 1920 he stood trial as a collaborator and was sentenced to two years in prison, serving 14 months of the sentence. After his release he was unable to continue his academic career and took an office job, which he lost during the Great Depression. In his final years he dedicated his time to local history, in particular of Bornem. He died in Jette (Brussels) on 27 June 1937.

== Selected works ==
- Histoire de la découverte des îles Açores (Ghent, 1901)
- L'institution consulaire en Belgique depuis 1830 (Ronse, 1908)
- "La statistique douanière de la Belgique dans la seconde moitié du XVIIIe siècle", Revue belge d'histoire, 1 (1914), pp. 72-97.
