= Gaston Burssens =

Belgian poet

- Born: Gaston Karel Mathilde Burssens; 18 February 1896; Dendermonde, Belgium
- Died: 29 January 1965 (aged 68); Antwerp, Belgium
- Occupation: poet

Gaston Karel Mathilde Burssens (18 February 1896 – 29 January 1965) was a Belgian Expressionist poet. He studied at the Dutch-language Von Bissing University in Ghent during the German occupation of Belgium during World War I.

== Biography ==
Like that of Paul van Ostaijen, Burssens' work in the 1920s evolved from humanitarian expressionism towards a more organic expressionism – upon which his poetry stayed focused on musicality. Van Ostaijen's not earlier published poems were published posthumously by Burssens.

Burssens received the 'Driejaarlijkse Prijs voor Poëzie', a reward for poetry granted every third year, for 1950–52, and once again for 1956–58.

== Works ==
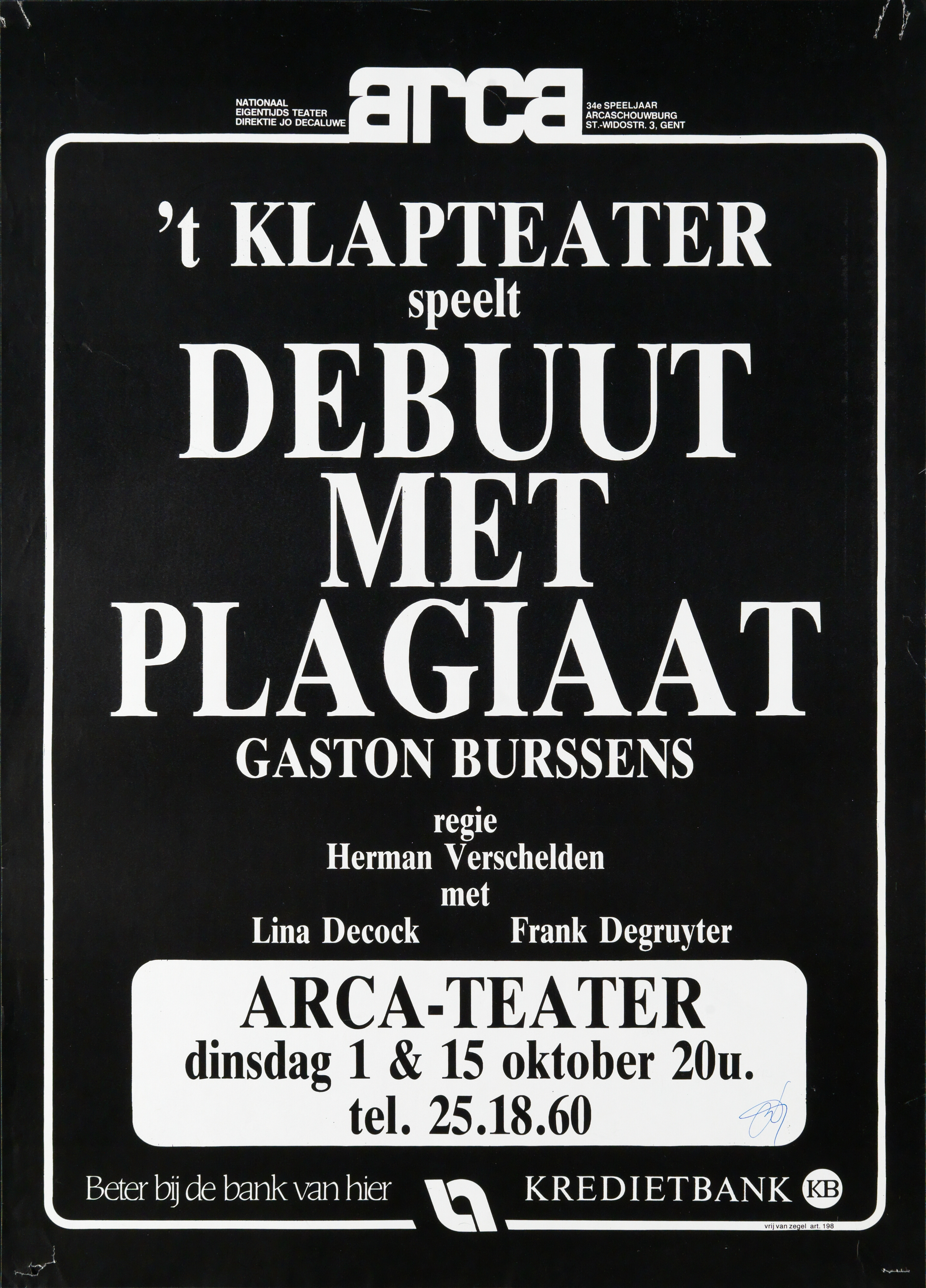
Poster of a stage performance "Debuut met Plagiaat" in 1983 by the theatre company 't Klapteater.

- 1918 Verzen
- 1919 De Yadefluit
- 1920 Liederen uit de stad en uit de sel
- 1924 Piano
- 1926 Enzovoort
- 1930 Klemmen voor zangvogels
- 1933 Paul van Ostaijen zoals hij was en is
- 1935 French en andere cancan
- 1941 De eeuw van Pericles
- 1943 Elegie
- -- Floris Jespers
- 1945 Fabula rasa
- 1946 12 niggersongs
- 1952 Pegasos van Troja
- -- Boy
- 1954 Ode
- 1956 Floris Jespers
- -- Paul van Ostaijen
- -- Het neusje van de inktvis
- 1956 Debuut met Plagiaat
- 1958 Adieu
- 1961 Posthume verzen
- 1981 Verzameld proza
- 2005 Alles is mogelijk in een gedicht. Verzamelde verzen 1914-1965
