= Generalgouvernement =

Generalgouvernement is a German term that may refer to:

- General Government of Belgium under German occupation during World War I
- General Government of Warsaw under German occupation during World War I
- General Government in German-occupied Poland during World War II
