= Charles Polydore de Mont =

Belgian poet, writer

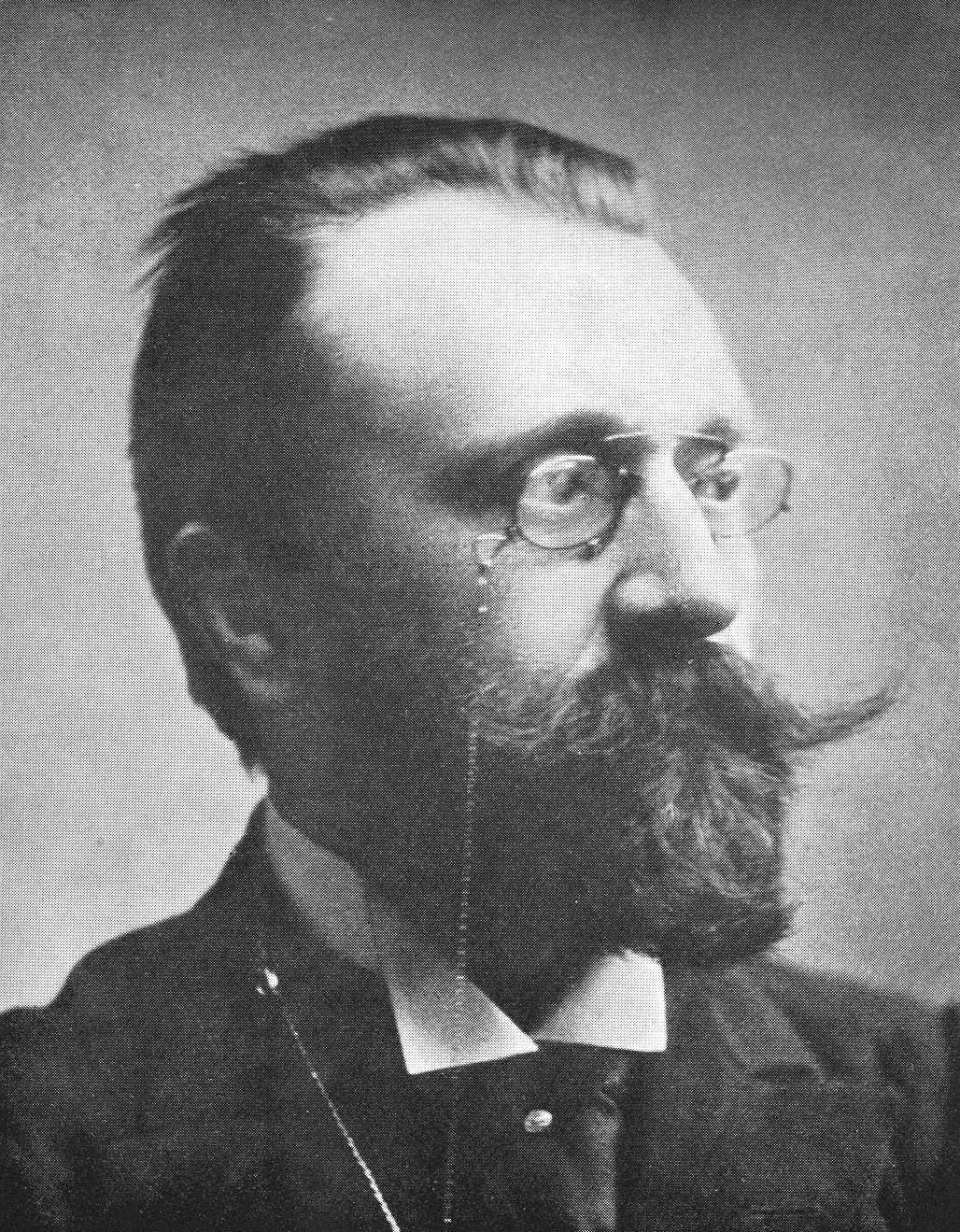
Pol de Mont in 1896

Charles Polydore de Mont or Pol de Mont (Wambeek, 15 April 1857 – 29 June 1931) was a Belgian writer and poet.

After his secondary education, in French, at Ninove, he went to the Klein seminarie in Mechelen. Here he wrote his first poems, which he published in one volume as Klimoprankske (1875). He studied law at the Catholic University of Leuven, where he founded, together with Albrecht Rodenbach, Het Pennoen. In 1880 he was awarded the Quinquennial Prize for Flemish Literature for his poems which were published in Gedichten.

He started his professional career as a teacher at the Koninklijk Atheneum (E: Royal Atheneum ) in Antwerp. In 1904 he was appointed Director of the Museum of Fine Arts in Antwerp, and a year later he was one of the co-founders of the illustrated magazine De Vlaamse Gids. In 1919, he resigned his position as Director of the museum because he had been accused of Activism during World War I. He became chief editor of the newspaper De Schelde, where among his employees were Paul Van Ostaijen and Alice Nahon.

== Bibliography ==
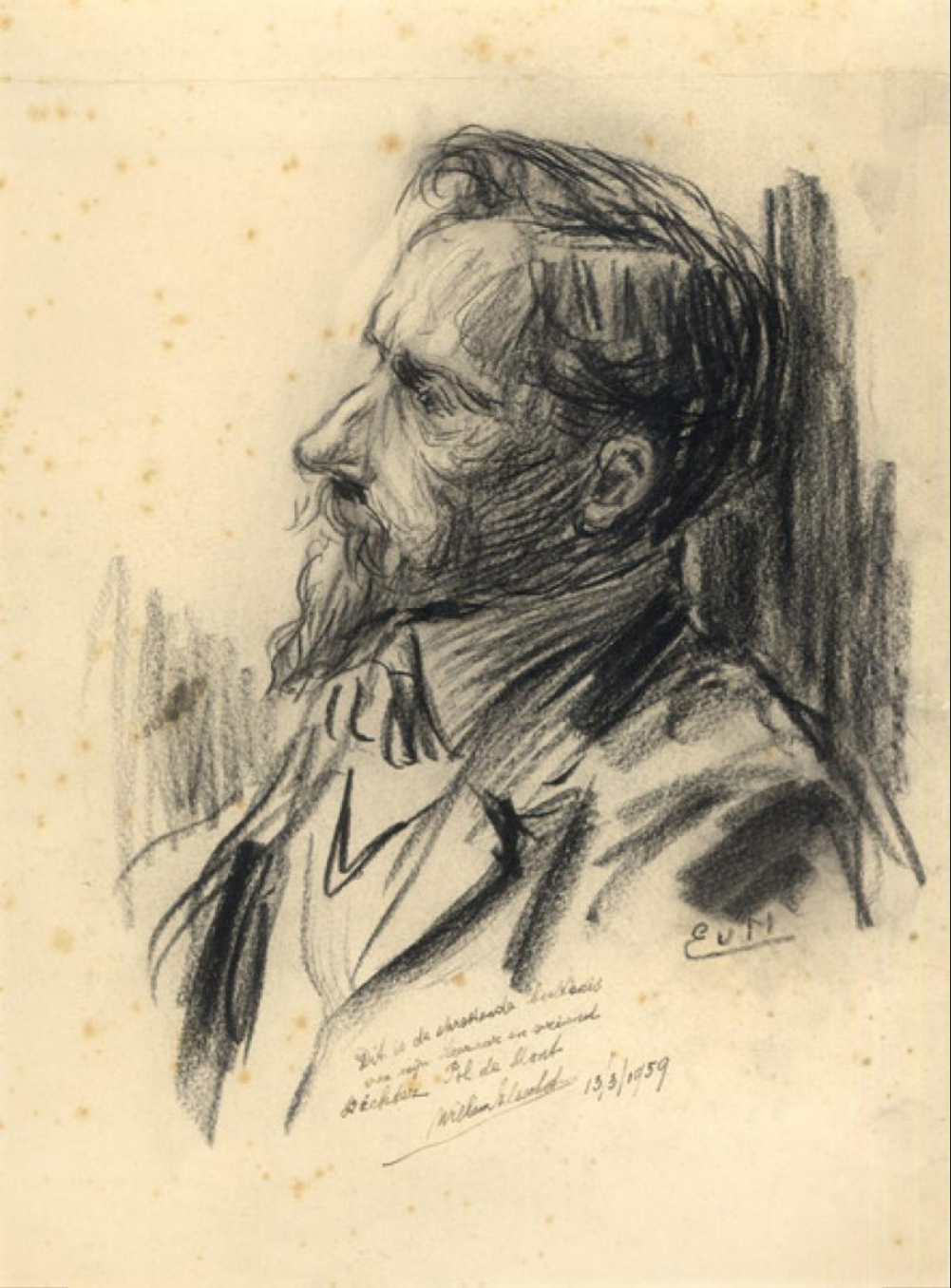
Portrait by Eugeen Van Mieghem, 1920

- Klimoprankskes (poëzie, 1875)
- Rijzende sterren (poëzie, 1879)
- Gedichten (poëzie, 1880)
- Lentesotternijen (poëzie, 1881)
- Idyllen (poëzie, 1882)
- Loreley (poëzie, 1882)
- Hendrik Conscience. Zijn leven en werken (studie, 1883)
- Idyllen en andere gedichten (poëzie, 1884)
- Fladderende vlinders (poëzie, 1885)
- Claribella (poëzie, 1893)
- Iris (poëzie, 1894)
- Dit zijn Vlaamsche wondersprookjes (volkskundige studie, 1896)
- Dit zijn Vlaamsche vertelsels (volkskundige studie, 1898)
- Drie groote Vlamingen (essay, 1901)
- Vlaamse schilders der negentiende eeuw (essay, 1901)
- De schilderkunst in België van 1830 tot 1921 (essay, 1921)
- Zomervlammen (poëzie, 1922)
- Wondervertelsels uit Vlaanderen. Uit den volksmond opgeteekend (samen met Alfons De Cock, 1924)

== See also ==
- Flemish literature

== Sources ==
- Pol de Mont (Dutch)
- Pol de Mont (Dutch)
