= Comité National de Secours et d'Alimentation =

Relief organization

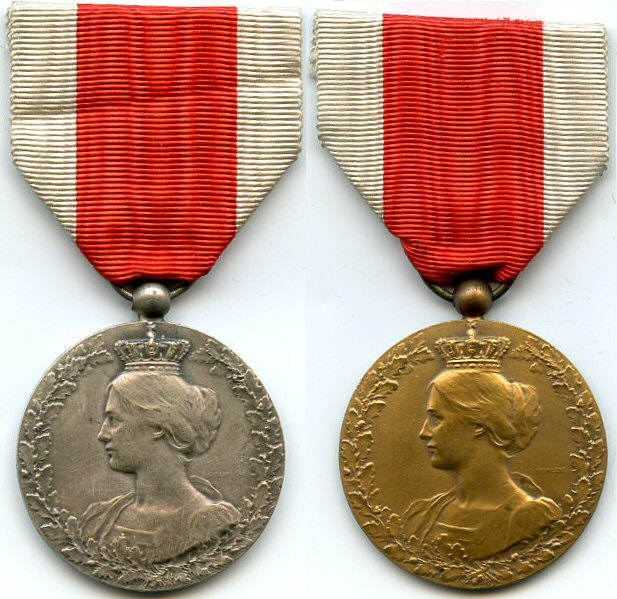
Medals awarded to members of the CNSA after the war, depicting Queen Elisabeth

The Comité National de Secours et d'Alimentation (CNSA, "National Relief and Food Committee"; Dutch: Nationaal Hulp- en Voedingscomité) was a relief organization created in 1914 to distribute humanitarian aid to civilians in German-occupied Belgium during World War I. It was directed by the Belgian financier Émile Francqui. The CNSA acted as the network by which the aid brought in by the international Commission for Relief in Belgium (CRB) could be distributed within Belgium itself.

== Background ==
Before the outbreak of World War I, Belgium relied on supplies of imports for almost three-quarters of all food consumed. With the German invasion in August 1914, the importation ceased and, as the economic crisis created by the invasion escalated, the distribution of the food that was available began to break down. In particular, the British Royal Navy began a four-year "Blockade of Europe" which, although aimed at Germany, also cut food supplies from neutral countries to German-occupied Belgium.

== Foundation and operation of the CNSA ==
The Committee was established in September 1914, shortly after the German army occupied Brussels, under the name Comité Central de Secours et d'Alimentation ("Central Relief and Food Committee"). It was supported by voluntary contributions from a small group of notable financiers and businessmen, including Ernest Solvay, Dannie Heineman and Émile Francqui.

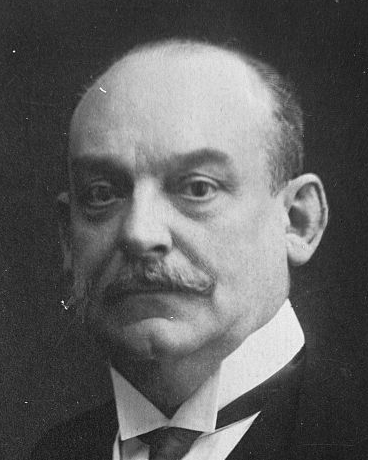
Émile Francqui, a businessman, who was instrumental to the foundation and operations of the CNSA

Initially, the Committee's activity was restricted to the city of Brussels and its suburbs. However, as the Germans extended their control across Belgium following the fall of the city of Antwerp in October 1914, and as the threat of famine within Belgium increased, the Committee linked up with similar organizations around the country and took the title "national". The initial direction of the Committee was given to Francqui. Francqui's position as head of the Société Générale de Belgique ("General Company of Belgium"), a giant semi-nationalized holdings company, allowed the CNSA access to a nationwide distribution network. From the start, the Committee was organized into two sections: one responsible for providing and selling food and the other for charitable aid such as clothing. Both sections of the CNSA were highly decentralized and relied heavily on local Committees across the country for much of their operations.

As an American, and therefore a citizen of a neutral country, Heineman used his contacts abroad to find overseas sources of food which might be shipped to Belgium to resupply the populace. Food from abroad being the only viable immediate solution to Belgium's food shortage, the Committee's chief initial difficulty was obtaining the permission of the British and German governments to import food and in providing guarantees that it would not be used for military purposes. The CNSA was also supported in its early activities by Charles de Broqueville's Belgian government in exile. The logistical problems involved in coordinating the huge shipments of food to Belgium meant that the CNSA began to look for foreign assistance in procuring and transporting material to Belgium. Francqui used his personal acquaintance with Herbert Hoover, future President of the United States, to create an external body to assist the management of the CNSA. Hoover became the director of the Commission for Relief in Belgium (CRB), and led successful attempts to raise money abroad in order to improve the humanitarian situation in Belgium. Because the CRB was officially an American organization, the CRB was also necessary to assure that the food, once delivered to the CNSA, was not immediately seized by the Germans. The CRB also provided the international support necessary to convince the British government to permit the shipments. Once received, the food and material from the CRB was distributed through the CNSA's network of 125,000 agents across the country.

The CNSA continued to expand throughout the occupation. In April 1915, the German Government allowed the CNSA to extend its operations to the occupied regions of northern France, under the auspices of a subcommittee called the Comité d'Alimentation du Nord de la France ("Food Committee of Northern France"). By 1918, the CNSA had distributed 3.4 billion Belgian francs' worth of aid across Belgium.

== Evaluation ==
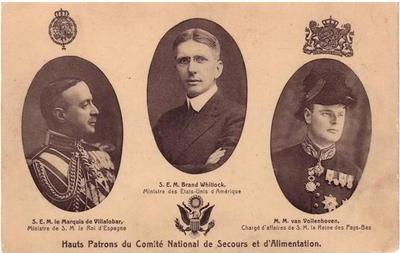
Postcard depicting the three patrons of the CNSA who were all ambassadors of neutral countries to Belgium: Brand Whitlock (United States); the Marques of Villalobar (Spain); and Maurits van Vollenhoven (Netherlands)

The work of the CNSA during the war was considered extremely successful by contemporaries and modern historians alike. By providing a network of food distribution, the CNSA and CRB managed to avoid a major famine in Belgium during the occupation. Nevertheless, although the CRB and CNSA were part of the same network, the CRB criticized the CNSA, holding it responsible for occasional thefts of food by the Germans and for providing inadequate security for the shipments. The Belgian arm, however, felt under undue pressure from the CRB. In 1916, Francqui even petitioned the British to allow the CNSA to take full charge of the international network away from the CRB, although this appeal was dismissed because of the precarious position CNSA held within the occupied country. Nevertheless, relations between the two bodies remained generally good.

The Committee also played an important political role. By providing an alternative supply of food, the CNSA prevented the German administration of Belgium from being able to use food as a bargaining tool to force Belgians to work in war industries and contributed to the passive resistance movement within occupied Belgium. However, the CNSA and CRB's activities meant that the Germans benefitted from having seven million Belgians and two million Frenchmen in their territory fed and consequently did not face major food riots or other disruption that might have arisen if the Germans had had to feed the population of the occupied territories. The Germans also exploited their deal agreeing to give impunity to CNSA food shipments by seizing food produced in Belgium.

The Belgian government in exile supported the CNSA, which they hoped, in the words of the Minister Michel Levie, would become an "underground parliament" and fulfill the day-to-day running of the Belgian state which the occupation made impossible for the official government to carry out. Historians have also described the organisation of the CNSA, with its central committee and local networks, and its activities such as providing unemployment benefits to Belgian workers in 1917, as echoing those of an official government in peacetime while also serving as a symbol of national unity.
