= Alice Nahon =

Belgian poet (1896–1933)

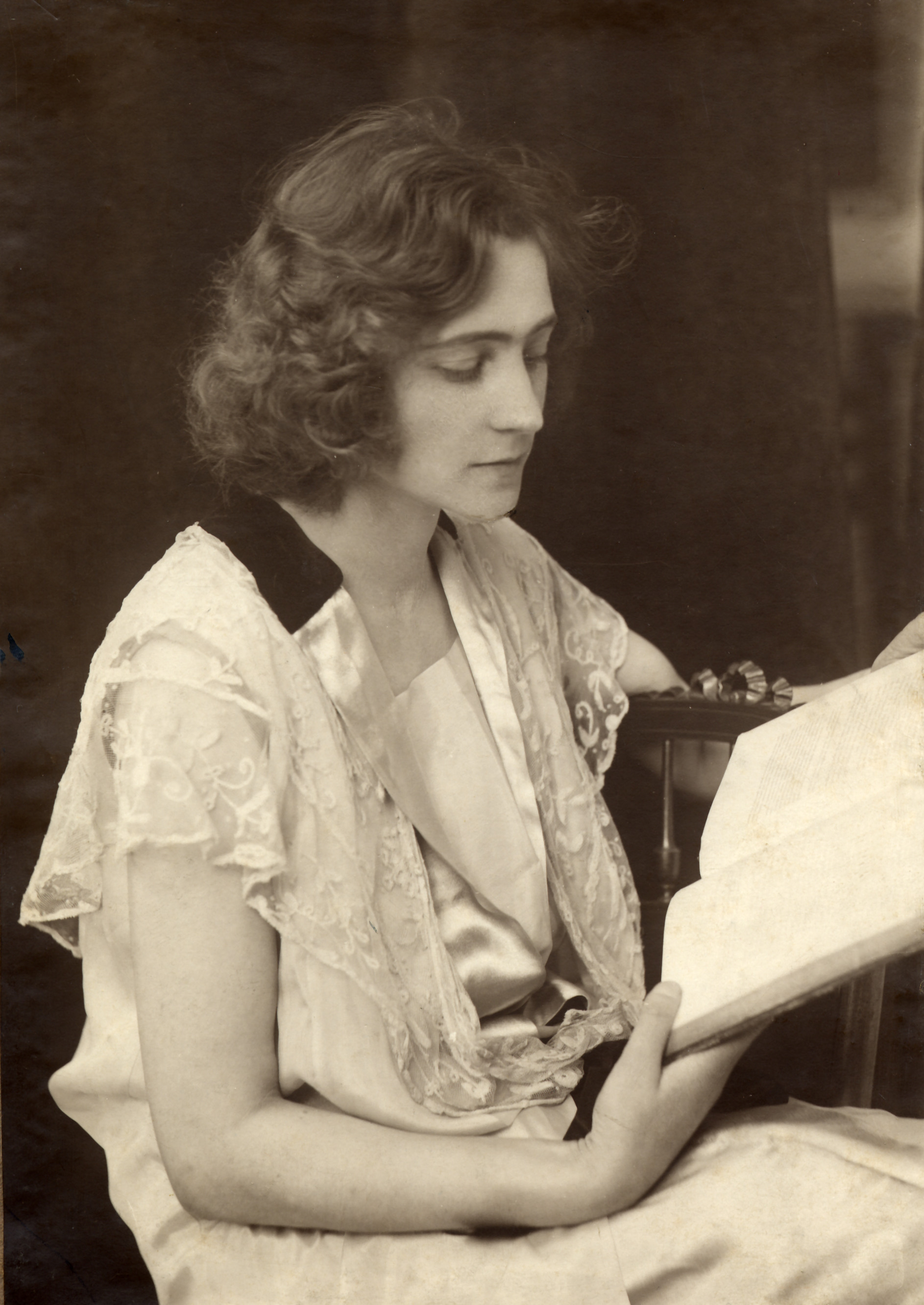
- Alice Nahon (1921)
- Born: Antwerp; 23 August 1896; Antwerp
- Died: 21 May 1933 (aged 36)
- Occupation: poet

Alice Nahon (16 August 1896 – 21 May 1933) was a Belgian poet from Antwerp.

== Biography ==
Alice Nahon was born in Antwerp on 23 August 1896. She was the third child in a family of eleven children. Her father, Gerard L. Nahon, was born in the Netherlands but of Huguenot origin. Her mother, Julia Gijsemans, was born in Putte, nearby Mechelen, where Alice spent much time during her childhood. She went to the primary school at the Oude God (English: Old God) and from 1911 she went to the School for Agriculture in Overijse, where she graduated.

However, when World War I broke out, she became a student nurse at the Stuivenberg hospital in Antwerp. After weeks of arduous labor, hardly eighteen years old, she became ill and it seemed that her lungs had been damaged. She still studied at the Akademie van Antwerpen (English: Academy of Antwerp) and literature classes of Pol De Mont, but during the following years she had to spend much of her time in sanatoria, and from 1917 she stayed at the Sint-Jozefsinstituut for six years, in Tessenderlo. The physicians of the institute convinced her that she had tuberculosis and that she would not have long to live. She became depressive and started reading her favorite poets, such as Guido Gezelle, and writing her own poems was her only consolation.

During her stay in Tessenderlo her first poems were published in Vlaamsch Leven. During her stay in the Sint-Jozefsinstituut she wrote two collections of poems: Vondelingskens (1920) and Op zachte vooizekens (1921), through which she became enormously popular, and no less than a quarter million copies were sold. Her poems testify of a love for nature, admiration for simple things and grieve for own and interwoven with other people's suffering, and with a religious inspiration. During this time, in 1920, she became acquainted with Fernand Berckelaers (alias Michel Seuphor – Seuphor anagram of Orpheus) and Geert Pijnenburg, who together had launched the avant-gardist review Het Overzicht (she published a poem in the first number of the review).

Thanks to the generosity of her many admirers she could consult a foreign doctor. In January 1923 she left Belgium for Luzern in Switzerland. After new investigations, it was determined that she did not suffer from tuberculosis, but from chronic bronchitis. After the years she had lost in the sanatoria she was sent to Italy, where she was cured shortly after her arrival. After she had spent some time in the Landes and in Paris, she returned to Antwerp, and underwent still new medical treatment in The Hague and Amsterdam.

She enjoyed her regained freedom, traveled as a celebrated poet through Flanders and the Netherlands and made many friends among artists. In 1927, she became town librarian in Mechelen, where she lived a fairly liberated way of life. However, she also became friends with more traditional writers, such as Maurits Sabbe and Gerard Walschap.

With her collection of poems Schaduw (1928) she tried to break away from her former well-behaved poetry, but she did not succeed. In 1932, she became ill again and had to resign her job as a librarian. She lived at the picturesque vault house of the medieval castle Cantecroy at Oude-God. Her health deteriorated and she spent the last year of her life at her apartment in the Carnotstraat (in nr 17) in the centre of Antwerp. As from January 1933, she became heavily sick and bedridden. She weakened from day to day, and after a painful illness she died on 21 May 1933, scarcely 36 years old. She was buried under enormous interest. Her grave is located on the Schoonselhof Cemetery in Antwerp. After her death, in 1936, the collection of poems Maart-April was published with previously unpublished work.

== Bibliography ==
- Vondelingskens (1920)
- Op zachte vooizekens (1921)
- Anthology of Alice Nahon, uit Vondelingskens and Op zachte vooizekens (1926)
- Schaduw (1928)
- Alice Nahon en haar gedichten. Anthology (1932)
- Maart-April. (1936)
- Bloemen van 't veld (anthology collected by Karel Jonckheere, 1970)
- Alice Nahon. Collected poems (1983)
- De mooiste gedichten van Alice Nahon (1983)

== See also ==
- Flemish literature
