= Von Bissing university =

University in German-occupied Belgium (1916-18)

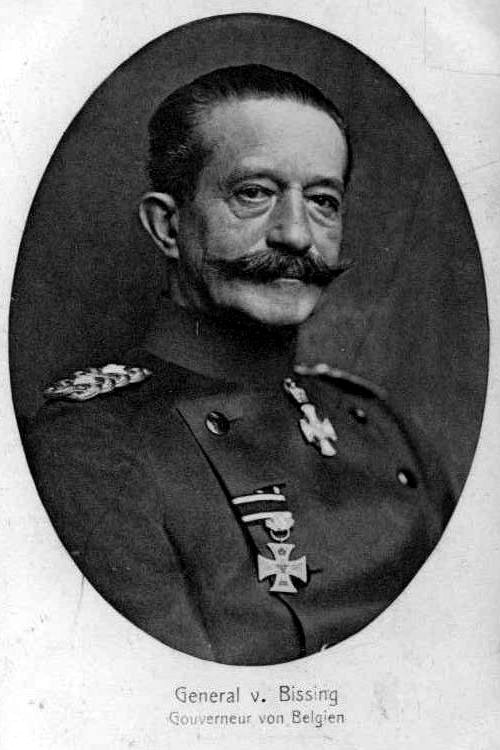
Moritz von Bissing, Governor-general of Belgium between 1914 and 1917.

The Vlaamsche Hoogeschool (Dutch; (Note: The archaic Dutch version of the spelling, Vlaemsche Hoogeschool, is also seen. It may also be rendered in the modern, simplified form Vlaamse Hogeschool. Another variation is Hoogeschool te Gent or "Academy at Ghent".) "Flemish Academy"), nicknamed von Bissing university (Dutch: von-Bissinguniversiteit) by critics, was a Dutch-speaking university established at Ghent in German-occupied Belgium in October 1916. The institution took its informal name from Moritz von Bissing, the German Governor-General of Belgium from 1914 to 1917.

Distinct from the existing State University of Ghent, the University's establishment was a key component of the Flemish policy (Flamenpolitik) pursued by the German occupation authorities. It responded to long-held grievances within the Flemish Movement about the absence of a Dutch-language university in the largely Dutch-speaking region of Flanders. In particular, all teaching at Ghent University had been conducted in French.

Von Bissing University was established in October 1916 but was widely condemned by academics and moderate "passivist" members of the Flemish Movement. It remained relatively small and is generally considered to have failed to achieve its objectives and closed after the collapse of the German occupation in 1918. Ghent University was ultimately "Flemishized" in 1930.

== Background ==
Before the outbreak of World War I higher education in Belgium was run in French, despite the presence of a majority Dutch-speaking population. French had historically been privileged as the language of the government, civil service and the bourgeois across the country. In the late 19th century, however, the emerging Flemish Movement (Vlaamse Beweging) increasingly challenged the use of French in majority Dutch-speaking Flanders. In the years before the World War I, the movement had achieved de jure legal equality for Dutch as an official national language, but the issue was still contentious at the outbreak of war in August 1914. In particular, the language used in higher education was still being highlighted by the Flemish Movement, as French remained the only language of instruction in all Belgian universities. At the outbreak of war, it appeared that the State University of Ghent, located in the Flemish city of Ghent, would be forced by law to begin teaching in Dutch by 1915, but the outbreak of war and German invasion of Belgium stopped any realization of this objective.

In German-occupied Belgium, Governor-General Moritz von Bissing sought to make the territory easier to govern by exploiting pre-war linguistic divisions. The Flamenpolitik ("Flemish policy") was launched in 1916 and was also influenced by Pan-German beliefs. In particular, since the issue of Ghent University was already contentious, the German administration hoped to legitimize itself and at the same time to discredit the Belgian state.

== University ==
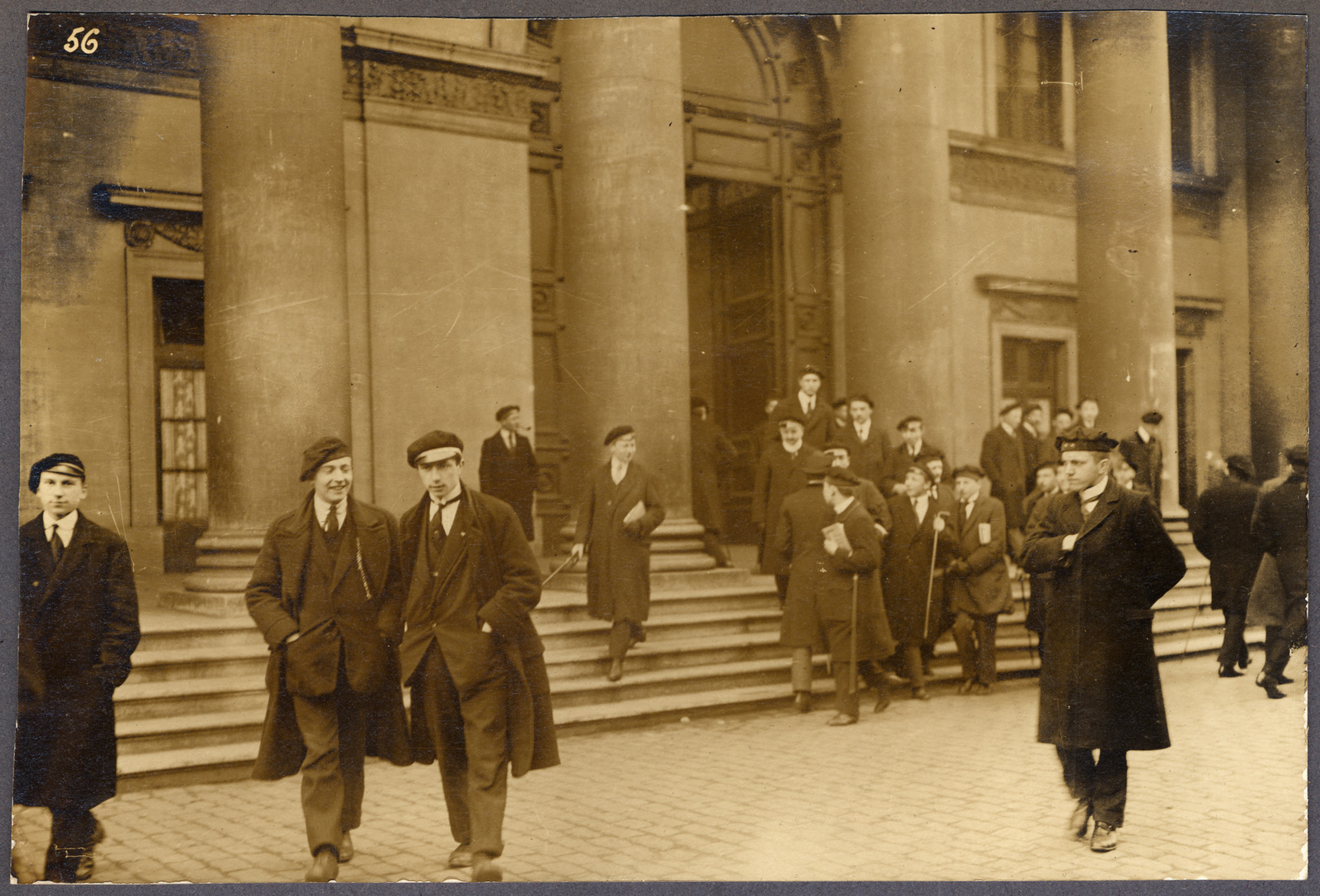
Students pictured outside the Aula of the university

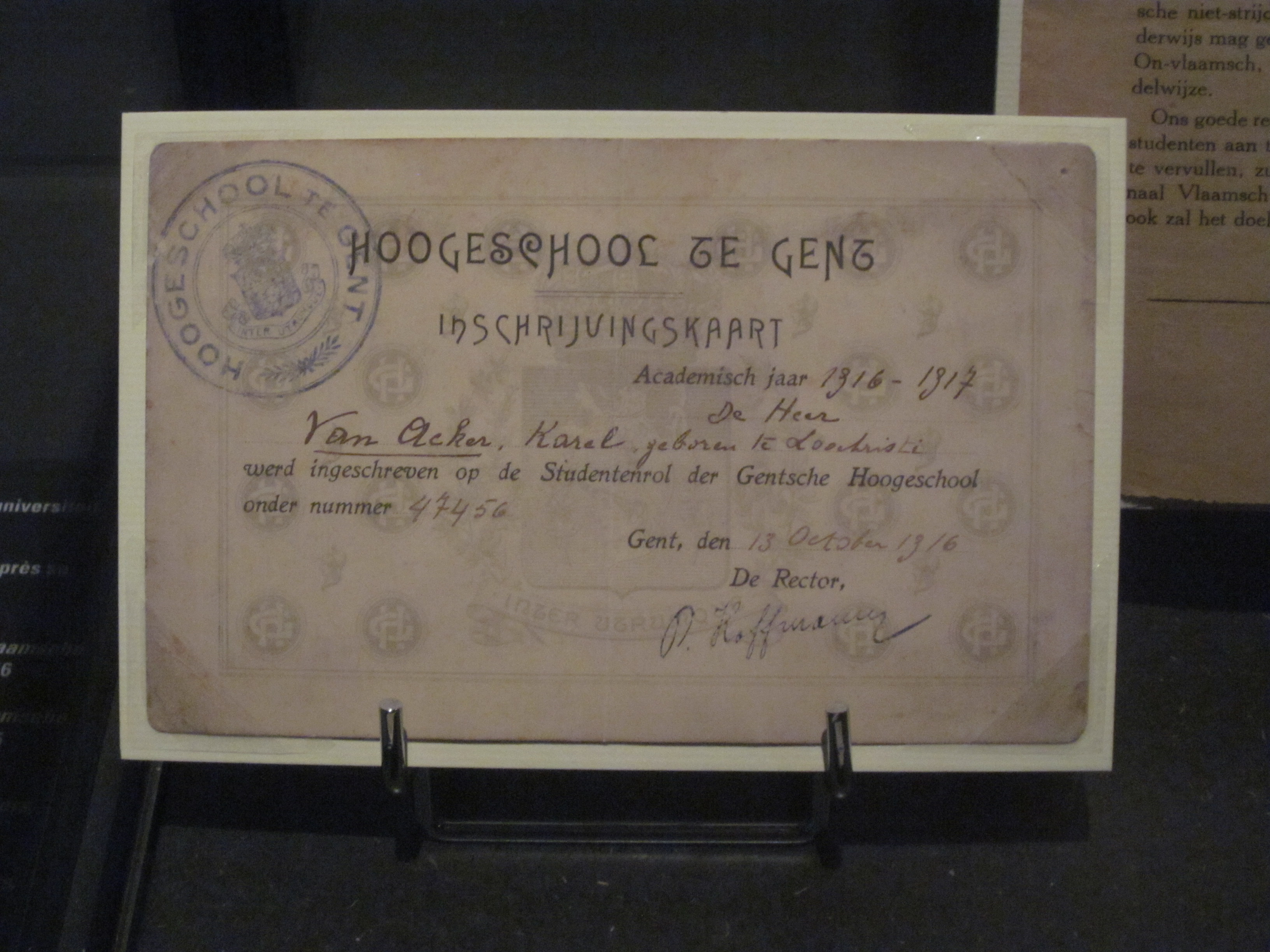
A certificate of registration from Von Bissing University

The university was inaugurated on 3 October 1916 with Peter Hoffmann as rector, with around 40 academics. The German mathematician, Walther von Dyck, was put in charge of the project. Von Dyck strongly believed that the university would defend Germany's strategic and military interests, describing it as "a mighty fortress, a trusty shield and a weapon for us Germans."

The university opened its doors on 24 October 1916. It faced opposition from current students at Ghent University, and also was condemned by a petition signed by 38 leading Flemish public figures including Louis Franck delivered before its opening. Among the academics was the lawyer Lodewijk Dosfel, historian Jules Mees, and the linguist Hippoliet Meert. Among the original students was the Flemish Movement activist Wies Moens and the poet Gaston Burssens. It was considerably smaller than the State University of Ghent, which admitted more than 1,200 students each year before the war. In contrast, between October 1916 and October 1918, 477 students registered at the Institute. 138 students were enrolled in the 1916-17 academic year which increased to 407 in 1917-18. .

== Reception and legacy ==
The university itself is considered by historians to have failed to achieve its aims. It failed to gain wide support from across Flemish Movement, particularly since some of the early supporters, including the historian Paul Fredericq who had campaigned for Dutch language instruction, had been imprisoned. It was equally resented by many French-speaking academics. Fredericq and his Ghent colleague Henri Pirenne, a celebrated historian, were deported to prison camps in Germany in March 1916. This, however, did not stop the continuation of the Flamenpolitik by the German administration, which led to the creation of the Council of Flanders (Raad van Vlaanderen, or RVV; a quasi-independent Flemish government) in February 1917.

Although the Flemish Movement had campaigned for the "Flemishization" (flamandisation) of Ghent University, many within the movement were divided about whether accepting the university would be collaboration and some students passively resisted it. The establishment of the university created a rupture within the Flemish Movement between the "activists" (activisten) who supported the German initiatives and the "passivists" (passivisten) who opposed any form of collaboration with the Germans. After the end of the war, in 1930, Ghent University became Dutch speaking following continued agitation by the Flemish Movement.

Von Bissing University featured in the Belgian 2014 miniseries In Vlaamse Velden ("In Flanders' Fields") produced by VRT. In it, one of the protagonists, Philippe Boesman (played by Wim Opbrouck), tries and fails to get tenure at the university as an academic gynaecologist.

== See also ==
- University of Warsaw - a similar institution reopened by German occupation authorities in 1915 to seek support from Polish nationalists in the former Russian Empire
