= Commission for Relief in Belgium =

World War I hunger relief organization

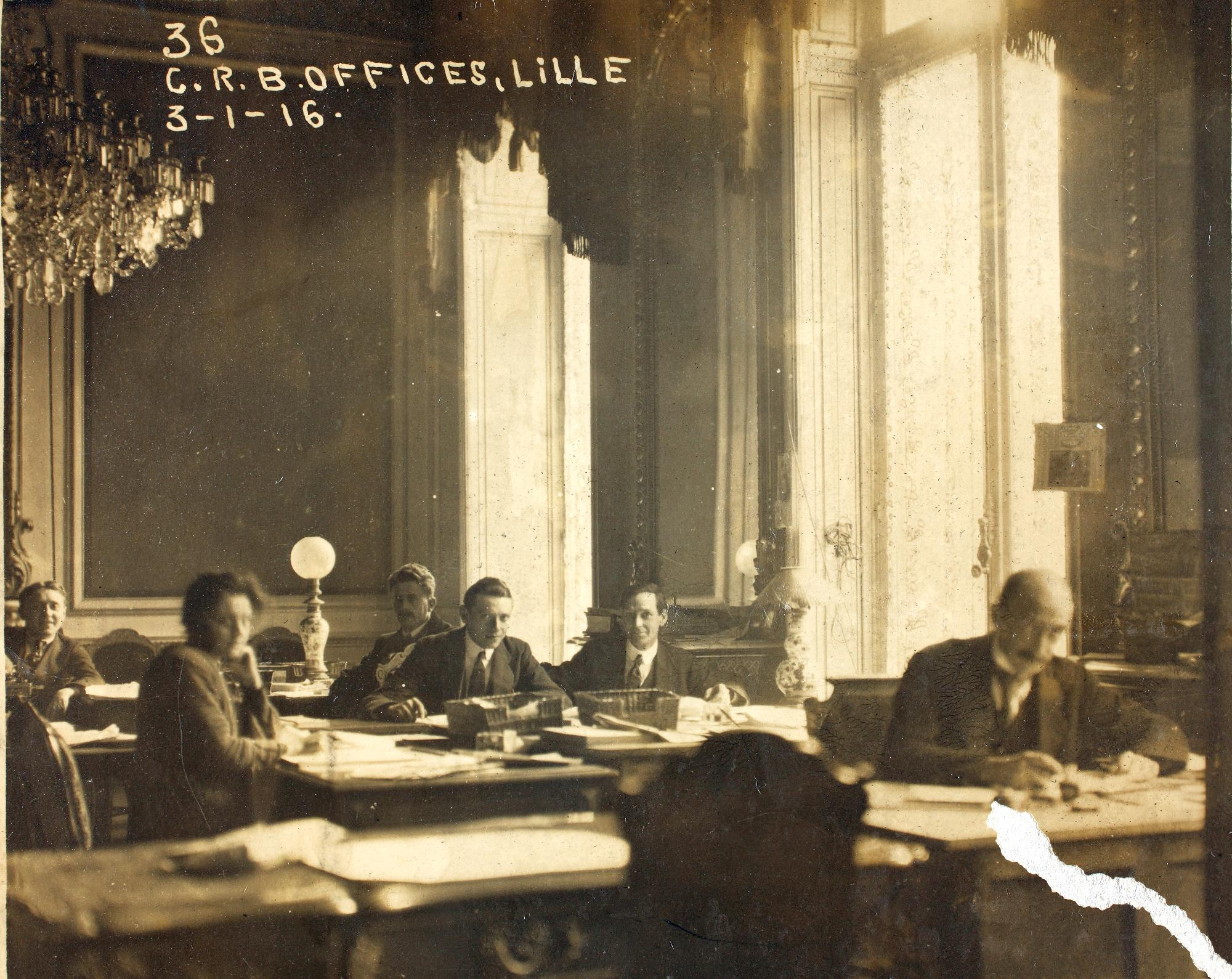
- The Committee for Relief in Belgium in Lille, France, a local group
- Formation: 1914; 112 years ago
- Founder: Herbert Hoover
- Dissolved: 1919; 107 years ago
- Legal status: Dissolved
- Headquarters: United States
- Region served: Belgium
- Website: Further Details

The Commission for Relief in Belgium (CRB, or simply Belgian Relief) was an international, predominantly American, organization that arranged for the supply of food to German-occupied Belgium and northern France during the First World War.

Its leading figure was chairman, and future President of the United States, Herbert Hoover.

== Origins ==
When the Great War broke out, Hoover was a mining engineer and financier living in London. When hostilities erupted, he found himself surrounded by tens of thousands of American tourists trying to get home. Their paper securities and travelers' checks were not being recognized and very few of them had enough hard currency to buy passage home, even if any ships had been sailing; most voyages had been canceled. Hoover set up and organized an "American committee" to "get the busted Yankee home," making loans and cashing checks as needed. By October 1914 the American Committee had sent some 120,000 Americans home, and in the end lost just $300 in unpaid debt. This episode brought Hoover and his organizational talents to the attention of the American ambassador, Walter Hines Page, and several other key people in London, who came to him in late October with a request for his help with a much larger problem:

In 1914, after being invaded by Germany, Belgium suffered a food shortage. The tiny nation, at the time among the most urbanized countries in Europe, only grew enough food to meet 20–25% of its needs. Nonetheless, the German occupiers were requisitioning what was there to help feed their army. The civilian population, in addition to the demoralizing effect of being occupied by Germany, faced imminent starvation unless a large quantity of food was quickly brought in.

However, buying and transporting food to Belgium was no simple matter, as American expatriate mining engineer Millard Shaler found out when he tried to do just that. Great Britain had imposed an economic blockade on Germany and its occupied countries. If Shaler brought food in, the British recognized, the Germans would just requisition it.

Seeking a solution to this dilemma, Shaler contacted ambassador Page, and Page contacted Hoover.

== Activities ==
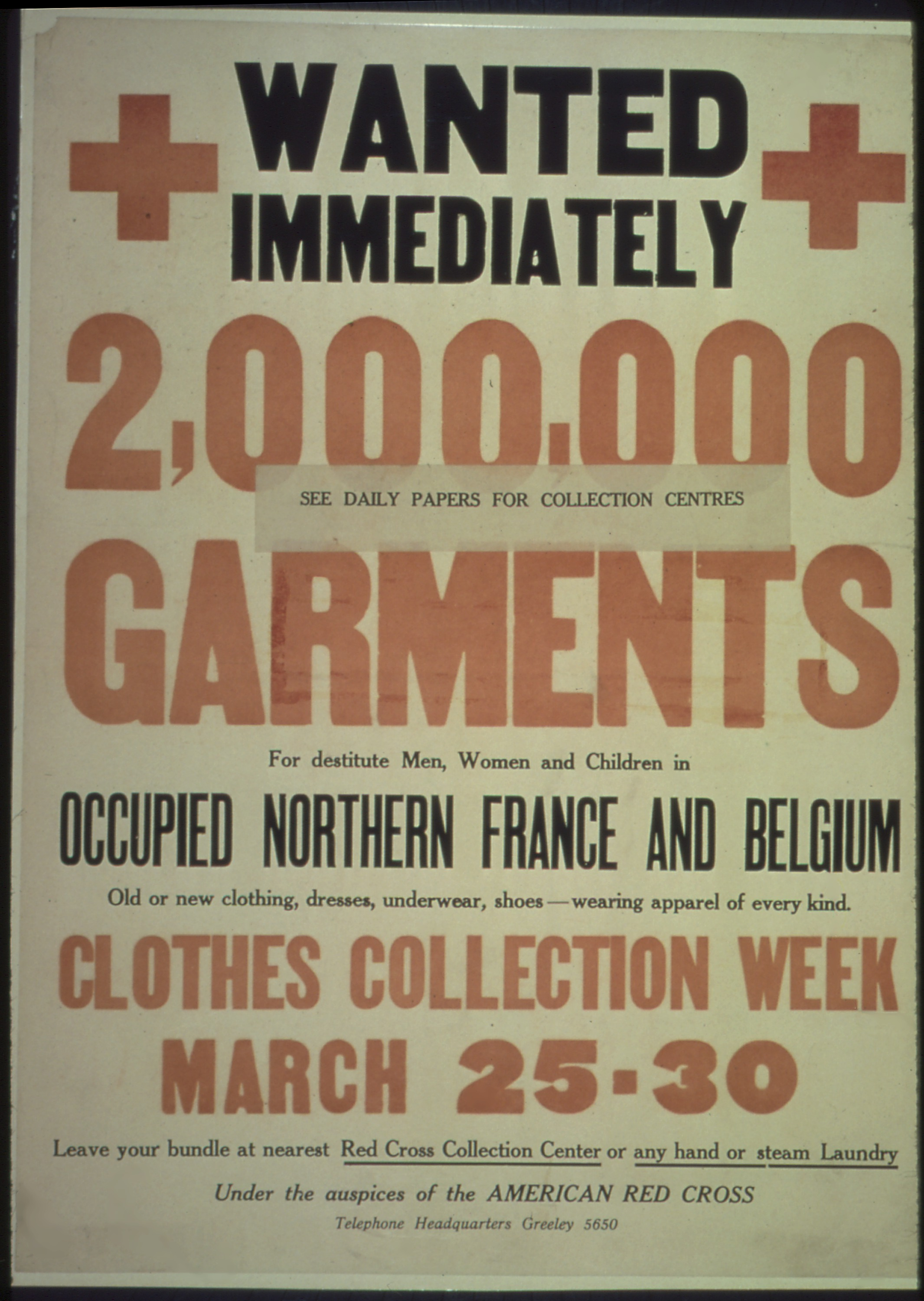
Poster requesting clothing for occupied France and Belgium

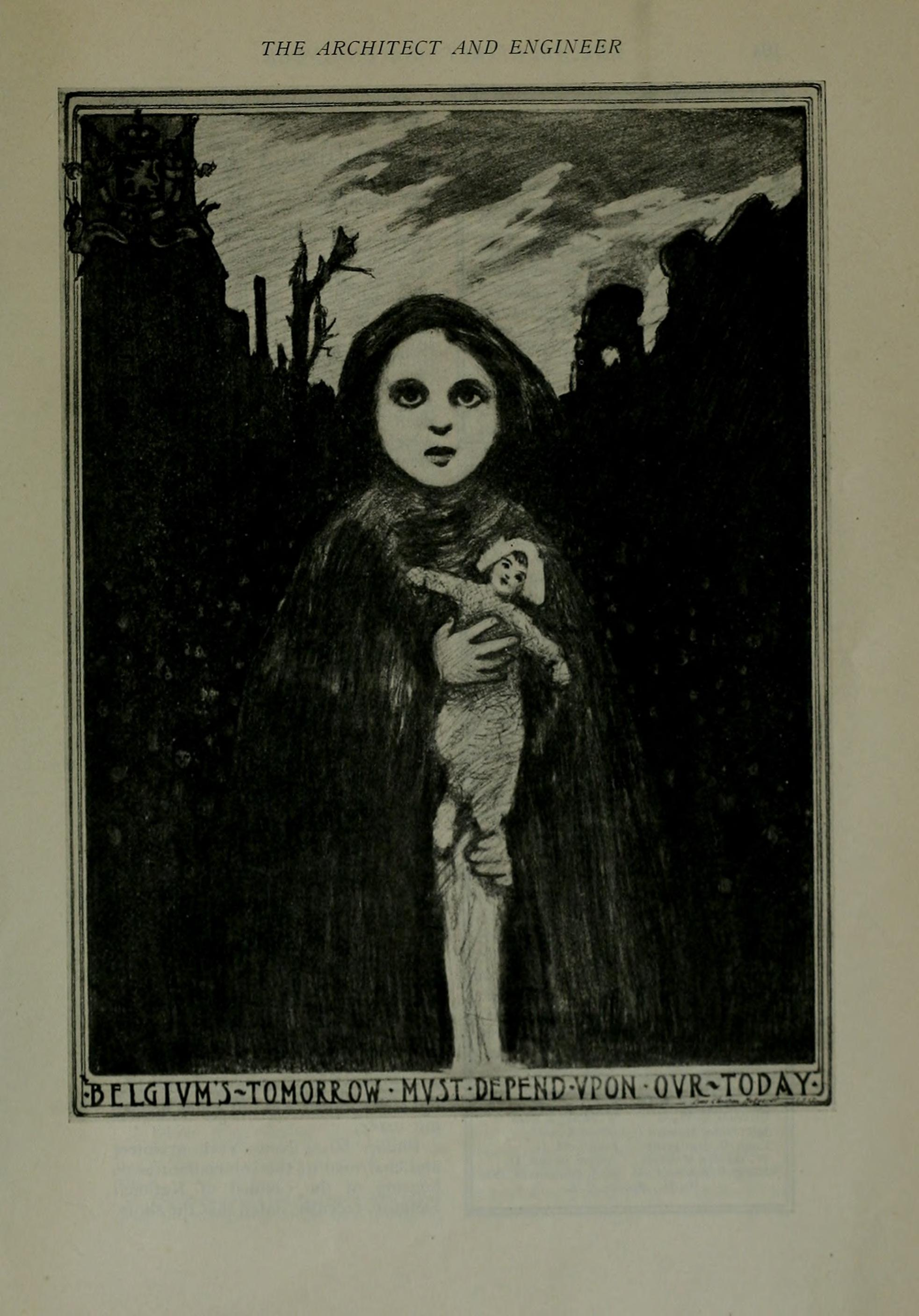
1917 poster for Belgian relief

The commission's task was to obtain foodstuffs from abroad and ship them into Belgium, where CRB monitors supervised distribution by members of the Comité National de Secours et d'Alimentation (CNSA), the Belgian organization headed by Émile Francqui. This was necessary because CNSA employees, living under the German occupation, were legally required to obey the orders of German soldiers, whereas CRB people were not. The food imported by the CRB remained the property of the American ambassador to Belgium, Brand Whitlock, throughout the distribution process and right up to the point of being placed on a plate.

== Obstacles and challenges ==
The CRB had to operate in the face of resentment from both of the warring sides. The Germans resented the presence of the Americans in the country and were bitter about the British blockade, which they saw as the reason for Belgium requiring foreign aid in the first place. Many influential British policymakers, notably Lord Kitchener and Winston Churchill, felt that Germany needed to either feed the Belgians themselves or deal with the resulting riots right behind their lines, and that international help to relieve that pressure was helping the Germans and thereby lengthening the war. At several points both sides tried to shut down the relief, and throughout the war there was a constant problem of German submarines sinking relief ships, especially at times when tensions with the U.S. were highest.

In the end, the CRB bought and shipped 11.4 billion pounds (5.7 million tons) of food to 9.5 million civilian victims of the war. The committee chartered ships to carry the food to Belgian ports under safe conduct terms arranged by Hoover in meetings with the British and German authorities.

Notwithstanding the special CRB flags flown by ships and enormous banners covering them, there were losses: the Harpalyce returning from Rotterdam after delivering a shipment was torpedoed by the German submarine SM UB-4 in April 1915 with the loss of 15 lives.

== Flour sacks ==
Between 1914 and 1919, the CRB operated entirely with voluntary efforts and was able to feed close to 10 millions people in occupied Belgium and northern France by raising the necessary money, obtaining voluntary contributions of food, shipping the food past the German submarine blockades and army occupied areas, and controlling the food distribution in Belgium.

The CRB shipped 697,116,000 pounds of flour to Belgium and evidence indicates that sugar and grains were also sent. The flour was packaged in cotton flour sacks by American mills. The movement of these bags throughout Belgium was carefully controlled by the CRB since cotton was in great demand for the manufacture of German ammunition and also because the CRB feared that the flour sacks would be taken out of Belgium, refilled with inferior flour, and resold as relief flour. As a result, the empty flour sacks were carefully accounted for and distributed to professional schools, sewing workrooms, convents, and individual artists.

Separate from the trade schools of Belgium, the professional schools specialized in training girls to sew, embroider, and make lace, and the sewing workrooms were large centers established in the major Belgian cities during the war to provide work for the thousands of unemployed. Girls and women made famous Belgian lace, embroidered textiles and repaired and remade clothing in these workrooms.

The flour sacks were used by these various Belgian groups to make new clothing, accessories, pillows, bags, and other functional items. Many women chose to embroider over the mill logo and the brand name of flour, but entirely original designs were sometimes created on the sacks and then embroidered, painted, or stenciled on the fabric. Frequent additions to the flour sacks were Belgian messages of gratitude to the Americans; embellishments of lace; the Belgian and American flags; the Belgian lion; the Gallic cock; the American eagle; symbols of peace, strength, and courage; the Belgian colors of red, yellow, and black; and the American colors of red, white, and blue. Artists, in particular, used the flour sacks as the canvas background for creating original oil paintings.

Differences appear in the designs and messages of the embroidered and painted flour sacks, due to the fact that Belgium is composed of two distinct groups of people: the Walloons or French speaking people in the south and the Flemish or Dutch speaking population in the north.

The completed flour sacks were carefully controlled and distributed to shops and organizations in Belgium, England, and the United States for the purpose of raising funds for food relief and to aid the prisoners of war. Many were also given as gifts to the member of the Commission for Relief in Belgium out of gratitude for the aid given the Belgian people.

Herbert Hoover was given several hundred of these flour sacks as gifts and the Herbert Hoover Presidential Library-Museum has one of the largest collections of World War I flour sacks in the world.

== See also ==
- Belgium in World War I
- Belgian American Educational Foundation
- University Foundation
- Halifax Explosion
