= Émile Francqui =

Belgian businessman and diplomat (1863–1935) who supported scientific research

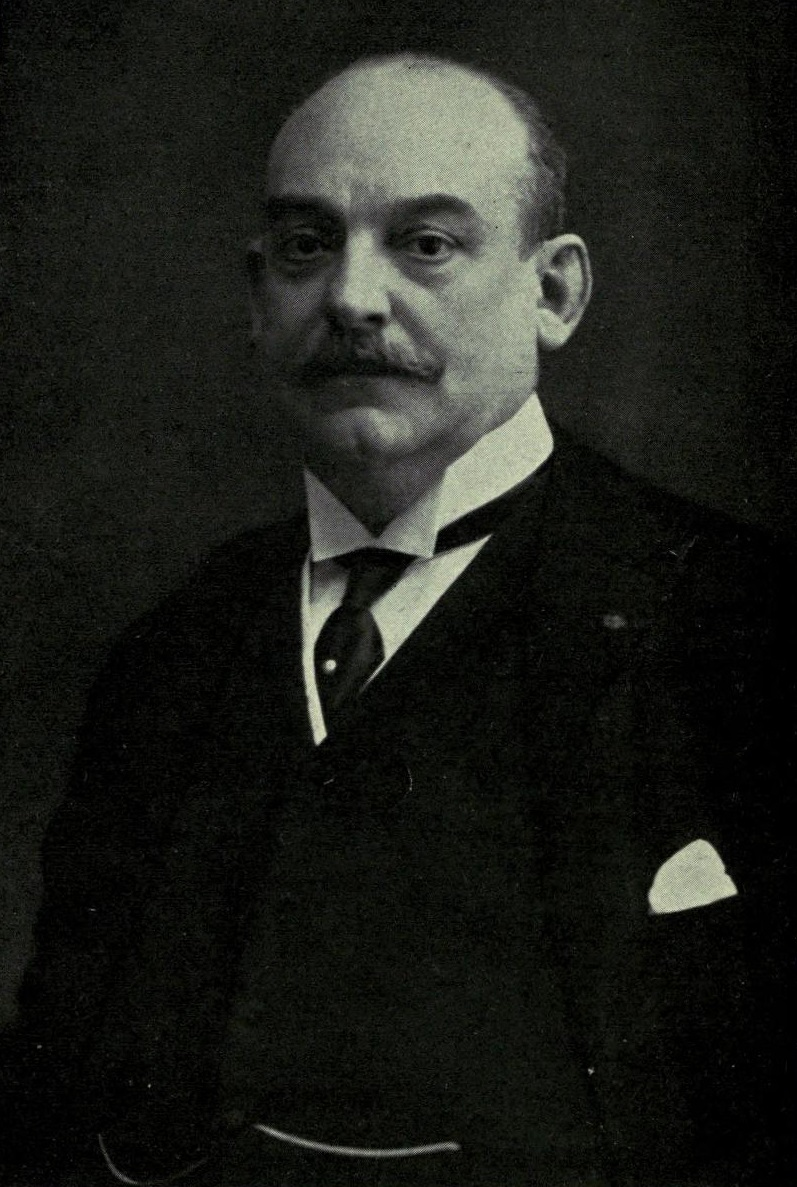
- Portrait of Francqui
- Born: 25 June 1863; Brussels, Belgium
- Died: 1 November 1935 (aged 72); Overijse, Belgium
- Occupations: Businessman, philanthropist, soldier, diplomat

Émile Francqui (French: [fʁɑ̃ki]; 25 June 1863 – 1 November 1935) was a Belgian soldier, diplomat, businessman and philanthropist.

== Career ==
Émile Francqui was sent to a military school when he was just 15 years old. At the age of 21, like many young officers, he was sent to Congo Free State by king Leopold II of Belgium.

In 1896, he became the Belgian consul in Imperial China and stayed there until 1902. In China he met the future American president Herbert Hoover during negotiations concerning the granting of the Hankow-Canton railroad concession in China in 1901. Although they were competitors, they respected each other very much and became friends.

Francqui returned to Belgium in 1902, and began a financial career. He became the managing director of the Banque d'Outremer, and managing director of the Union Minière du Haut Katanga (UMHK). Ten years after his return to Belgium, he became Director of the Société Générale de Belgique, and in 1932 became its Governor. During World War I he was President of the Belgian Comité National de Secours et d'Alimentation (National Aid and Food Committee, abbreviated to CNSA). During World War I, Herbert Hoover in the United States set up the Commission for Relief in Belgium (CRB) to support the CNSA abroad.

After the war the remaining resources of the committee were decided to be used for the rebuilding of Belgium. Émile Francqui wanted to invest in the universities as a means for rebuilding the country. In 1920 the University Foundation was founded by Émile Francqui. In addition the Belgian American Educational Foundation (BAEF) was founded for the exchange of students between Belgium and the United States. Émile Francqui was involved, with Félicien Cattier, in the establishment of the Fonds National de la Recherche Scientifique (FNRS).

In April 1924, Émile Francqui participated in the creation of the Dawes Plan to find a solution for the collection of the German reparations debt following World War I.

The future king, Leopold III, requested Francqui take steps to improve the health of the population Belgian Congo, leading to the foundation Prince Leopold Institute of Tropical Medicine in 1931 of which Francqui served as first President.

In 1932 Émile Francqui and Herbert Hoover created the Francqui Foundation for the support of basic research in Belgium.

== Honours ==
- 1918: Grand Officer on the Order of Leopold.
- 1926: Grand Cordon of the Order of Leopold.

== See also ==
- Francqui Prize
