= General Government of Belgium =

1914–1918 German military administration

Imperial German General Government of Belgium Kaiserliches Deutsches Generalgouvernement Belgien (German)
- 1914–1918
- Flag Coat of arms

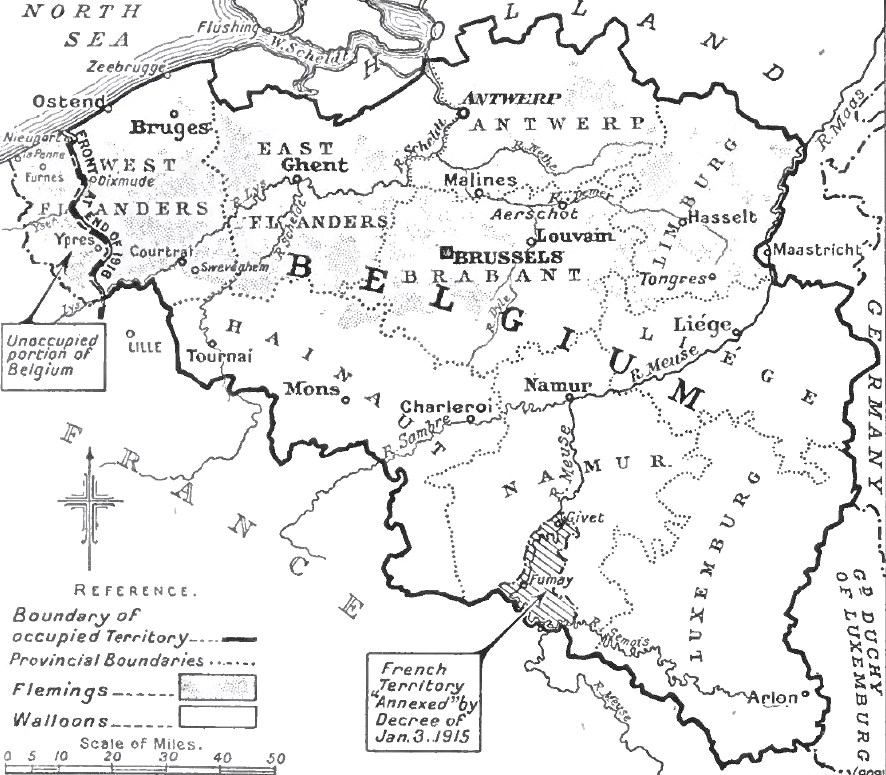
- Map of the whole area under German occupation, c.1916 of which the General Government was part.
- Capital: Brussels
- Military Governor of Belgium
  - Aug–Nov 1914: Colmar Freiherr von der Goltz
  - Dec 1914 –April 1917: Moritz von Bissing
  - May 1917–Nov 1918: Ludwig von Falkenhausen
- Historical era: World War I
  - Established: 26 August 1914
  - Rape of Belgium: 26 Aug 1914 - 9 Nov 1918
  - Armistice, withdrawal of German forces: 11 November 1918
- Currency: Belgian franc German Papiermark
- ISO 3166 code: BE
Preceded by	Succeeded by
Belgium; France	Belgium; France
- Today part of: Belgium; France

The Imperial German General Government of Belgium (German: Kaiserliches Deutsches Generalgouvernement Belgien) was a German Army occupation administration which administered one of the three separate occupation zones established in German-occupied Belgium during the First World War.

== Government and administration ==
The General Government was set up on 26 August 1914, when Field Marshal Colmar Freiherr von der Goltz was appointed as military governor of Belgium. He was succeeded by General Moritz von Bissing on 27 November 1914.

Soon after Bissing's appointment, the German High Command divided Belgium into three distinct administrative zones. The largest of the zones was the General Government, which included Brussels, the capital, and most of central and eastern Belgium. The second zone, under the control of the German Fourth Army, included the cities of Ghent and Antwerp and was known as the Etappengebiet ("Staging Area"). The third zone, under the auspices of the German Navy, included all Belgian coastal zones under German occupation and the areas closest to the front-line was called the Operationsgebiet ("Operational Area").

The German occupation tried to keep the pre-war Belgian administrative system as intact as possible and guide it using a small group of German officers and officials with adequate linguistic and administrative skills.

The occupation pushed to the breaking point what few constraints international law then imposed on an occupying power. A heavy-handed German military administration sought to regulate every detail of daily life, both on a personal level with travel restraints and collective punishment as on the economical level by harnessing the Belgian industry to the German advantage and by levying repetitive massive indemnities on the Belgian provinces. Among the measures of the German administration was to shift Belgium from Greenwich Mean Time to Central European Time. Before the war, Belgium was the sixth largest economy in the world; but the Germans destroyed the Belgian economy so thoroughly by dismantling industries and transporting the equipment and machinery to Germany that it never regained its pre-war level. More than 100,000 Belgian workers were forcibly deported to Germany to work in the war industry and to Northern France to build roads and other military facilities to the German military's benefit.

The German High Command hoped to exploit the ethnic tension between the Flemings and Walloons, and envisioned a post-war German protectorate in Flanders, while Wallonia was to be used for industrial materials and labour along with much of northeastern France.

In April 1917 Von Bissing died and he was succeeded by Ludwig von Falkenhausen.

=== Military Governors-General ===
No.	Portrait	Name	Term	Notes
1		Freiherr Colmar von der Goltz Pasha	26 Aug 1914 - 27 Nov 1914	Served as governor-general from August 1914 to November 1914. As head of the initial occupying force, he sought to quash the Belgian resistance with dispatch. The war crimes and methods of punishment used were collectively termed the "Rape of Belgium" in Allied propaganda. These actions were praised by Adolf Hitler in 1941. After his short tenure, he was reassigned to the Ottoman Theater.
2		Freiherr Moritz von Bissing	27 Nov 1914 – 10 April 1917	Served as governor-general from December 1914 until a few days before his death from a lung disease in April 1917. He oversaw the Flamenpolitik policies. The now-defunct Von Bissing University was named after him.
3		Freiherr Ludwig von Falkenhausen	22 Apr 1917 – 11 Nov 1918	Served as governor-general from May 1917 until the war's end in November 1918. The last German troops left Belgium 12 days after the armistice. 23 years later, Falkenhausen's nephew Alexander von Falkenhausen would serve as military governor of Belgium during World War II.

== See also ==
- Government General of Warsaw
- Von Bissing University
- Raad van Vlaanderen (World War I)
- Flamenpolitik
