= Moritz von Bissing =

German officer from Prussia (1844–1917)

- Born: 30 January 1844; Estate Ober Bellmannsdorf, Kreis Lauban, Regierungsbezirk Liegnitz, Province of Silesia, Kingdom of Prussia, German Confederation
- Died: 18 April 1917 (aged 73); Orban Castle in the "Drie Fonteinen" (Troisfontaines) park near Vilvoorde, northeast of Brussels, German-occupied Belgium
- Relatives: ∞ 1872 Myrrha Wesendonck, 1 son ∞ 1890 Alice Gräfin von Königsmarck, 3 children
- Military career
- Allegiance: Prussia; German Confederation; North German Confederation; German Empire
- Branch: Prussian Army; German Federal Army; Imperial German Army
- Service years: 1863–1907; 1914–1917
- Rank: Generaloberst (Colonel General)
- Commands: Gardes du Corps; 29th Division; VII Army Corps
- Conflicts: Austro-Prussian War; Franco-Prussian War; World War I
- Awards: Iron Cross; Red Eagle Order; Black Eagle Order
- Other work: Member of the Prussian House of Lords (1910–1917)

Moritz Ferdinand Freiherr von Bissing (30 January 1844 – 18 April 1917) was a German officer and politician from Prussia.

== Life ==
=== Pre-WWI army career ===
Moritz was born at the family estate of Ober Bellmannsdorf in the Province of Silesia. He was the son of lord of the manor Moritz Freiherr von Bissing (1802–1860), a member of the landed gentry and Royal Prussian Chamberlain. On 1 October 1863, Bissing entered the Prussian Army and was commissioned as a 2nd Lieutenant in the 2nd Silesian Dragoon Regiment No. 8 in 1865. He soon saw active service in the Austro-Prussian War and the Franco-Prussian War. Gaining steady promotion, in 1887 the young Major was appointed as an aide-de-camp to the prince Wilhelm, who later became the Emperor Wilhelm II. He served in the guards cavalry until 1897, when he was given command of the 29th Infantry Division. From 1901 to 1907 Bissing commanded the VII Army Corps in Münster. On 27 January 1902, he was promoted to General of the Cavalry, and he retired from the army on 12 December 1907.

=== First World War ===
Upon the outbreak of the First World War, von Bissing was recalled to active duty as deputy commanding general of the VII Army Corps, serving in that post from 2 August until November 1914. After the fall of Belgium during the early months of the War, Bissing was promoted to Generaloberst and appointed as Governor-General of occupied Belgium, serving from December 1914 until a few days before his death in 1917.

As governor-general, Bissing executed the German Flamenpolitik, during which he netherlandized the Ghent University to make it the first solely Dutch-speaking university in Belgium. As the German Chancellor Theobald von Bethmann Hollweg encouraged Flemish nationalist leaders to declare independence and to integrate into the German sphere, Bissing convened a commission to organise the division of Belgium, issuing a decree on 21 March 1917 which separated Belgium into two administrative areas, Flanders and Wallonia. This was the first attempt at dividing Belgium along linguistic lines.

Taking into account the decision by Walloon nationalists in 1912 to recognize Namur as the central city of Wallonia, Bissing established the Walloon administration there. Wallonia then consisted of four southern Belgian provinces and the district of Nivelles, part of the province of Brabant, thus realizing another revendication of the Walloon movement, the creation of a Walloon Brabant. The Flemish region had Brussels as its capital and was made up of the four northern provinces of Belgium, as well as the districts of Brussels and Leuven.

Among many others, Bissing signed the warrant for the execution of Edith Cavell.

==== Association of Model Settlements for War-Damaged ====
Freiherr von Bissing was the founder of the "Association of Model Settlements for War-Damaged" (Verein Mustersiedlungen für Kriegsbeschädigte), whose aim it was to build settlements for in the war wounded and disabled soldiers and their families. In 1916, von Bissing donated land from the Maximilian Graf von Spee's estate, which had previously been transferred to him. The settlement of Rheinisch-Bissingheim was to be built on this land. Around the same time, construction began on the Bissingheim settlement in Hagen. During the incorporation of surrounding areas into Hagen, the Bissingheim Damaschkehof was renamed Bissinghof.

== Death ==
In April 1917, a chronic lung ailment forced von Bissing to resign his post as Governor-General, and he succumbed to his illness a few days later on 18 April 1917. Generaloberst Ludwig Freiherr von Falkenhausen would become his successor on 22 April 1917. He is buried at the Invalidenfriedhof in Berlin.

== Promotions ==
- 1 October 1863 Dragoner mit der Aussicht auf Beförderung (Dragoon with the prospect of promotion)
- 22 May 1864 Portepee-Fähnrich (Officer Cadet)
- 11 November 1865 Seconde-Lieutenant (2nd Lieutenant) with Patent from 11 October 1865
- 14 December 1871 Premier-Lieutenant (1st Lieutenant)
  - 15 January 1874 received a slightly improved Patent from 16 November 1871
- 1 June 1875 Hauptmann (Captain)
  - 18 September 1880 reclassified as Rittmeister
  - 7 April 1883 reclassified as Hauptmann
- 2 June 1883 Major
- 19 June 1888 Oberst-Lieutenant (Lieutenant Colonel)
- 23 May 1890 Oberst (Colonel)
  - 29 March 1892 received standing as Brigade Commander (Rang als Brigadekommandeur erhalten)
- 17 March 1894 General-Major (Major General)
- 10 September 1897 Generallieutenant (Lieutenant General)
- 27 January 1902 General der Kavallerie (General of the Cavalry)
- 24 December 1914 Generaloberst

== Awards and decorations (excerpt) ==
- Kingdom of Prussia:
  - Iron Cross (1870), 2nd Class
  - Knight of the Red Eagle, 3rd Class with Bow, 17 June 1890; 2nd Class with Oak Leaves and Crown, 1895; with Star, 15 June 1898; Grand Cross
  - Knight of the Royal Crown Order, 1st Class with Swords on Ring
  - Commander's Cross of the Royal House Order of Hohenzollern
  - Service Award Cross
  - Knight of the Black Eagle, 11 September 1907; with Collar 18 January 1909
- Baden: Grand Cross of Zähringer Lion, 1900
- Kingdom of Bavaria: Knight of the Military Merit Order, 1st Class
- Brunswick: Commander of the Order of Henry the Lion, 2nd Class
- Lippe-Detmold: Cross of Honour of the House Order of Lippe, 1st Class
- Mecklenburg-Schwerin: Grand Commander of the Griffon
- Kingdom of Saxony: Knight of the Albert Order, 1st Class, 1871; Commander 1st Class, 1896; Grand Cross with Swords on Ring
- Württemberg: Knight of the Friedrich Order, 1st Class with Swords, 1871
- (Austrian Empire) (Kingdom of Hungary) Austria-Hungary:
  - Knight of the Iron Crown, 2nd Class, 1889
  - Commander of the Order of Franz Joseph, with Star, 1892
- Belgium: Commander of the Order of Leopold
- Denmark: Commander of the Dannebrog, 1st Class, 30 November 1891
- Kingdom of Italy:
  - Grand Cross of the Order of Saints Maurice and Lazarus
  - Grand Officer of the Crown of Italy
- Netherlands: Grand Officer of the Order of Orange-Nassau
- Ottoman Empire: Order of the Medjidie, 1st Class
- Kingdom of Romania:
  - Grand Officer of the Star of Romania
  - Grand Officer of the Crown of Romania
- Russian Empire: Knight of St. Anna, 2nd Class
- Sweden-Norway: Commander of the Sword, 2nd Class, 31 August 1888

== See also ==
- Von Bissing university
