= Raad van Vlaanderen =

Pro-German organization in occupied Belgium of WWI

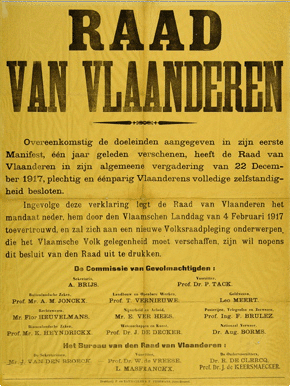
Proclamation issued by the Raad van Vlaanderen proclaiming Flemish independence in December 1917

The Council of Flanders (Dutch: Raad van Vlaanderen, or RVV) was formed by members of the "activist" or "maximalist" faction of the Flemish Movement in German-occupied Belgium on 4 February 1917 with tacit German support. Its founders, who included Pieter Tack and August Borms, wanted to realize the independence of Flanders from Belgium using German support provided as part of the Flamenpolitik. The Council originally included 46 members, but eventually expanded to include 93. Despite hopes that the council would be allowed full legislative powers, it never became more than a consultative body. It also suffered from internal factionalism and infighting.

Its members were broadly supported by the Germans but were condemned by other flamingants and the Catholic Church. The Germans subsequently made Flanders and Wallonia separate administrative regions in June 1917. However, the appointment of Georg von Hertling as German Chancellor in November 1917 who opposed the Flamenpolitik reduced support for the RVV among the German administration. On 22 December 1917, without prior consultation with the occupation authorities, the RVV declared Flanders to be independent and dissolved itself to prepare for elections for a new Flemish government. The German authorities viewed the declaration ambivalently and in January 1918 rejected a draft Flemish constitution presented by the RVV. 50,000 people registered to vote in the coming elections but there were clashes with opponents in Mechelen, Antwerp and Tienen.

The Belgian Court of Appeal issued warrants for the arrest of Tack and Borms as the two leading members of the RVV but they were freed by the German authorities which instead deported the judges responsible. In protest, judges at the Court of Cassation, the country's supreme court, refused to try cases and other judges also went on strike. Faced with mounting opposition, the Germans stopped the planned elections in March 1918.

The German surrender in November 1918 led to the end of the council as King Albert I with the Belgian Army and government regained control. In the aftermath of the war, many of the members of the RVV were arrested and imprisoned as collaborators.

== See also ==
- Flamenpolitik
- Von Bissing University
