= Flamenpolitik =

Policy practiced by German-occupied Belgium

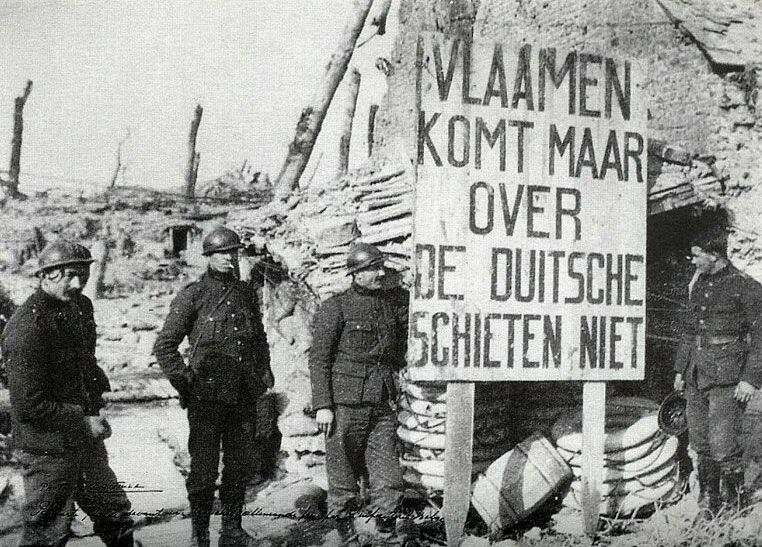
A sign saying (in broken Dutch): "Flemings come on over, the Germans will not shoot."

Flamenpolitik (lit. 'Flemish policy') is a policy practiced by German authorities occupying Belgium during World War I and World War II. The ultimate goals of these policies was the dissolution of Belgium into separate Walloon and Flemish components and Germanisation.

The German authorities aimed to exploit the longstanding linguistic problems in Belgium, particularly the systematic discrimination towards the Dutch language that existed before World War I. The policy was also based on Pan-Germanism. The German policy of fostering separatism in Flanders was a failure because it did not win popular support.

== World War I ==
In the beginning, Flamenpolitik consisted only of an effort to translate the laws of Germany into the languages of Belgium. However, in 1916, a new plan was developed with the idea that Belgium should never again be an obstacle to German advancement and that Germany should be surrounded by weak buffer states open to German influence. This plan required a separate Flemish state not subject to Walloon influence, and thus necessitated much more radical measures than had yet been taken.

The first exclusively Dutch-speaking university, Von Bissing University, was established in Ghent, named after the German Governor General Moritz von Bissing. This was for a long time a demand of the Flemish Movement. The German authorities supported the Council of Flanders, which in 1917 proclaimed the autonomy of Flanders. German Chancellor Theobald von Bethmann Hollweg encouraged Flemish nationalist leaders to declare independence and to integrate into the German sphere. The German occupying forces were helped and encouraged by Walloon and Flemish nationalist movements. Governor convened a commission to prepare for the division of the country.

On 21 March 1917, by a decree, Belgium was separated into two administrative areas: Flanders, including Brussels, and Wallonia. A Flemish government, known as the Raad van Vlaanderen was established. In 1912, Walloon nationalists recognized Namur as the most central city of Wallonia so Germans chose Namur as the Walloon administration headquarters. Wallonia then consisted of four southern Belgian provinces and one part of the province of Brabant: the district of Nivelles, realizing also another demand of the Walloon movement: the creation of the Walloon Brabant. The Flemish region had Brussels as its capital, and was made up of the four northern provinces of Belgium, as well as the districts of Brussels and Leuven. This was the first attempt at dividing Belgium along linguistic lines.

The geographical basis for the country's division was largely inspired by the federalist goals of the Flemish and Walloon nationalist movements, and divisions along similar lines were advanced later by the same movements. In the present day, after the federalisation of Belgium, the Flemish Community and Wallonia have the same capitals and almost the same territory as the administrative entities of Flamenpolitik.

== World War II ==
Adolf Hitler pursued a similar policy aimed at the dissolution of Belgium; however, this version of Flamenpolitik also aimed at the Aryanization of the Belgian territories.

As part of this policy, the German authorities decided to release all Flemish NCOs and reservists who were made prisoners of war after the Belgian surrender. Any soldier of these categories who passed a linguistic test was theoretically entitled to an Entlassungschein, allowing him to return home.

However, in practice this was extended preferentially to Flemish soldiers, while Walloon soldiers frequently remained in POW camps until the end of the war. That policy was intended to exacerbate internal Belgian conflicts and foster support for the German occupiers in the north of Belgium. Implementation was made easier by the fact that in 1938 the Belgian army had been divided into Flemish and Walloon regiments.

The German regime decided to take the next step for the wartime Flamenpolitik in 1944 by initiating the total annexation of both the Flemish and Walloon sections of Belgium as full-fledged provinces of the German Reich: the Reichsgaue Flandern and Wallonien. The bicultural capital of Brussels was maintained as special district under the authority of a Reichskommissar.

== See also ==
- Flemish National Union
- Rexism
