= 39th Infantry Regiment (France) =

- 39e régiment d'infanterie
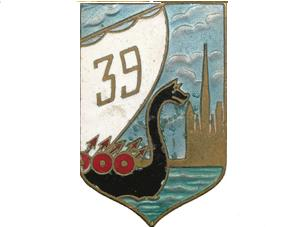
- Active: 1629–1990
- Country: France
- Branch: French Army
- Role: Infantry
- Size: Regiment
- Engagements: Anglo-French War; Thirty Years' War; Seven Years' War; French Revolutionary War; Napoleonic Wars; World War I World War II; Cold War; Algerian War

The 39th Infantry Regiment (French: 39^{e} régiment d'infanterie (39^{e} RI)) was a line infantry regiment of the French Army.

== History ==
It was formed in 1629 as the régiment du baron de Mesle, formed of Belgian recruits. It was renamed the régiment d’Isle-de-France in 1762 then the 39th Line Infantry Regiment in 1791. It was renamed a demi-brigade in 1793 but retained the numeral 39. It resumed its 1791 title in 1803, before being renamed the Légion de la Seine inférieure (1815), then the 1re légion de la Seine inférieure (1819). It resumed its 1791 title yet again in 1820, before that title was simplified to 39th Infantry Regiment in 1882. It was active under that name from 1914 to 1940, 1944 to 1946, 1956 to 1963 and 1964 to 1990, when it was finally disbanded.

== Former officers ==
- Émile Carré
- Pierre Clavel, captain then chef de bataillon to the 39th Demi-Brigade of the 2nd Formation
- Roger Martin du Gard, 1902–1903.
- Césaire Levillain, 1905–1906.
- Roland Dorgelès, volunteered in August 1914, awarded the Croix de guerre.
- Philippe Étancelin, volunteered 1916 to 1919.
- Paul Anquetil
- Georges Scapini
- Pierre de Maismont, Compagnon de la Libération, sous-lieutenant 1933 to 1935
