= French prisoners of war in World War II =

French and French colonial soldiers captured by Nazi Germany

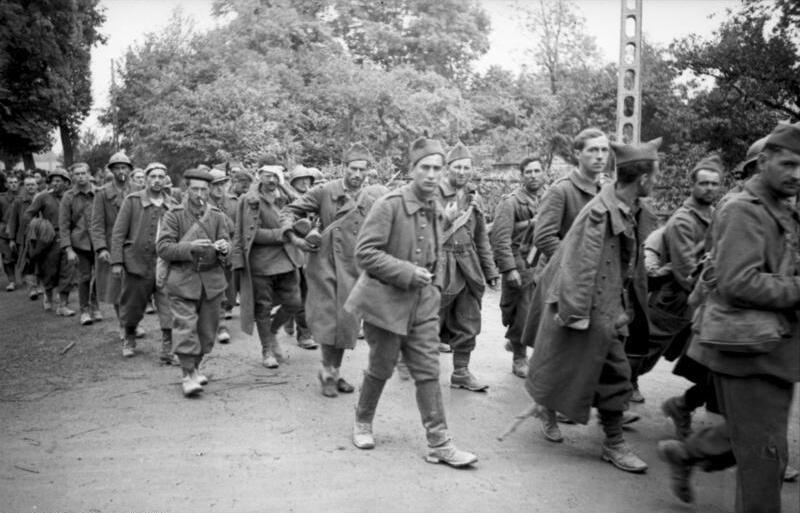
French prisoners of war being marched away from the front, May 1940

Although no precise estimates exist, the number of French soldiers captured by Nazi Germany during the Battle of France between May and June 1940 is generally recognised around 1.8 million, equivalent to around 10 percent of the total adult male population of France at the time. After a brief period of captivity in France, most of the prisoners were deported to Germany. In Germany, prisoners were incarcerated in Stalag or Oflag prison camps, according to rank, but the vast majority were soon transferred to work details (Kommandos) working in German agriculture or industry. Prisoners from the French colonial empire, however, remained in camps in France with poor living conditions as a result of Nazi racial ideologies.

During negotiations for the Armistice of 22 June 1940, the Vichy French government adopted a policy of collaboration in hopes for German concessions allowing repatriation. The Germans nevertheless deferred the return of prisoners until the negotiation of a final peace treaty, which never occurred due to the United Kingdom's refusal to surrender and Germany's defeat in the Battle of Britain. The absence of a large proportion of the male population of France also had important consequences on the position of women in occupied France and charity fundraising on behalf of the prisoners played an important role in French daily life until late in the occupation. Limited repatriation of certain classes of POWs did occur from 1940 and the government was keen to encourage the return of prisoners, even launching the unpopular relève system in order to exchange prisoners of war for French labourers going to work in Germany. Nevertheless, many prisoners remained in German captivity until the defeat of Germany in 1945. Prisoners who returned to France, either by repatriation or through escaping, generally found themselves stigmatised by the French civilian population and received little official recognition.

== Background ==
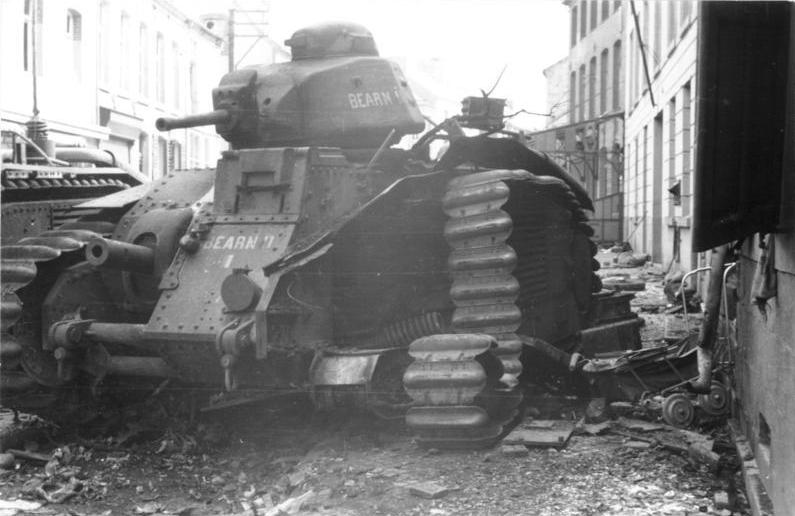
A French Char B1 tank destroyed during the fighting in May 1940

France declared war on Germany alongside the United Kingdom following the German invasion of Poland in September 1939. The Anglo-French Supreme War Council decided to stay on the defensive along the border, relying on the Maginot Line in helping counter an anticipated German offensive across the German-French border. As neither side made any offensive moves, a Drôle de Guerre (Phoney War) developed as both sides stood-off along the border.

On 10 May 1940, the Germans launched an invasion of France through neutral Belgium, the Netherlands and Luxembourg. Shortly afterwards, a breakthrough at Sedan outflanked the force which the French and British had sent into Belgium. By the end of May, the Belgian and Dutch armies had surrendered and the British were evacuating their Expeditionary Force from Dunkirk. German forces reached Paris on 14 June. In total, around 100,000 French soldiers were killed in action. The trauma from the German victories caused a period of division within the government of the Third Republic. German commanders finally met with French officials on 18 June who sought a cessation of hostilities, with the goal being an armistice with Germany. Marshal Philippe Pétain, who had been celebrated as a war hero in World War I, came to power as Prime Minister.

Pétain's government signed an armistice agreement on 22 June 1940 to end hostilities. Shortly afterwards, he established a new conservative and authoritarian Vichy regime ostensibly to lead a moral renewal of France and to purge the country of the communism, freemasonry, and Jewish influence which conservatives blamed for causing the military defeat in June 1940. Although the Vichy regime continued to control the so-called zone libre in southern France, the north and north-west of the country, including Paris, became the zone occupée under German military occupation. Alsace-Lorraine became a de facto part of Germany while Italy also received a small occupied region in France's south-east. In practice, Vichy exercised only very limited form of sovereignty in the occupied zones. Vichy was nominally independent and saw itself as neutral in the ongoing conflict. It retained control over France's pre-war colonial empire but in practice was essentially a German client state.

== Prisoners of war of Germany ==
By the time of the armistice on 22 June, approximately 1.8 million French soldiers were in captivity; a figure representing roughly 10 percent of the total adult male population of France at the time. One of the terms of the Compiègne Armistice was that French prisoners would remain in German custody until the end of the war which was thought to be imminent. French prisoners came from all backgrounds, regions and civilian occupations within France and also included a substantial number of soldiers from the French colonial empire. Nevertheless, approximately a third of all French prisoners of war were French farmers or peasants and, in some regions, the total proportion of agricultural workers captured was much higher. This created labour shortages in many civilian occupations, particularly agriculture which was largely unmechanised.

During the interwar period, France had experienced considerable immigration from elsewhere in Europe. In particular, a large number of Poles and Spanish republicans, who had emigrated to France, subsequently served in the French army and were captured by the Germans. These foreign prisoners were often singled out for worse treatment. (Note: Among the French soldiers captured in 1940 were individuals classified by the Germans as Polish, Italian, Russian, Turkish, Spanish, Hungarian, Swiss, Yugoslav, Belgian, Portuguese, Bulgarian, Danish, Norwegian, Slovak, Greek, Armenian and South American.)

In 1944 and 1945, as the German situation deteriorated, provision of food to POW camps became more sporadic and starvation became a problem. As Soviet troops advanced westwards, camps in the east were evacuated and moved on foot, in so-called death marches, away from the front in extremely poor conditions.

=== Prison camps ===
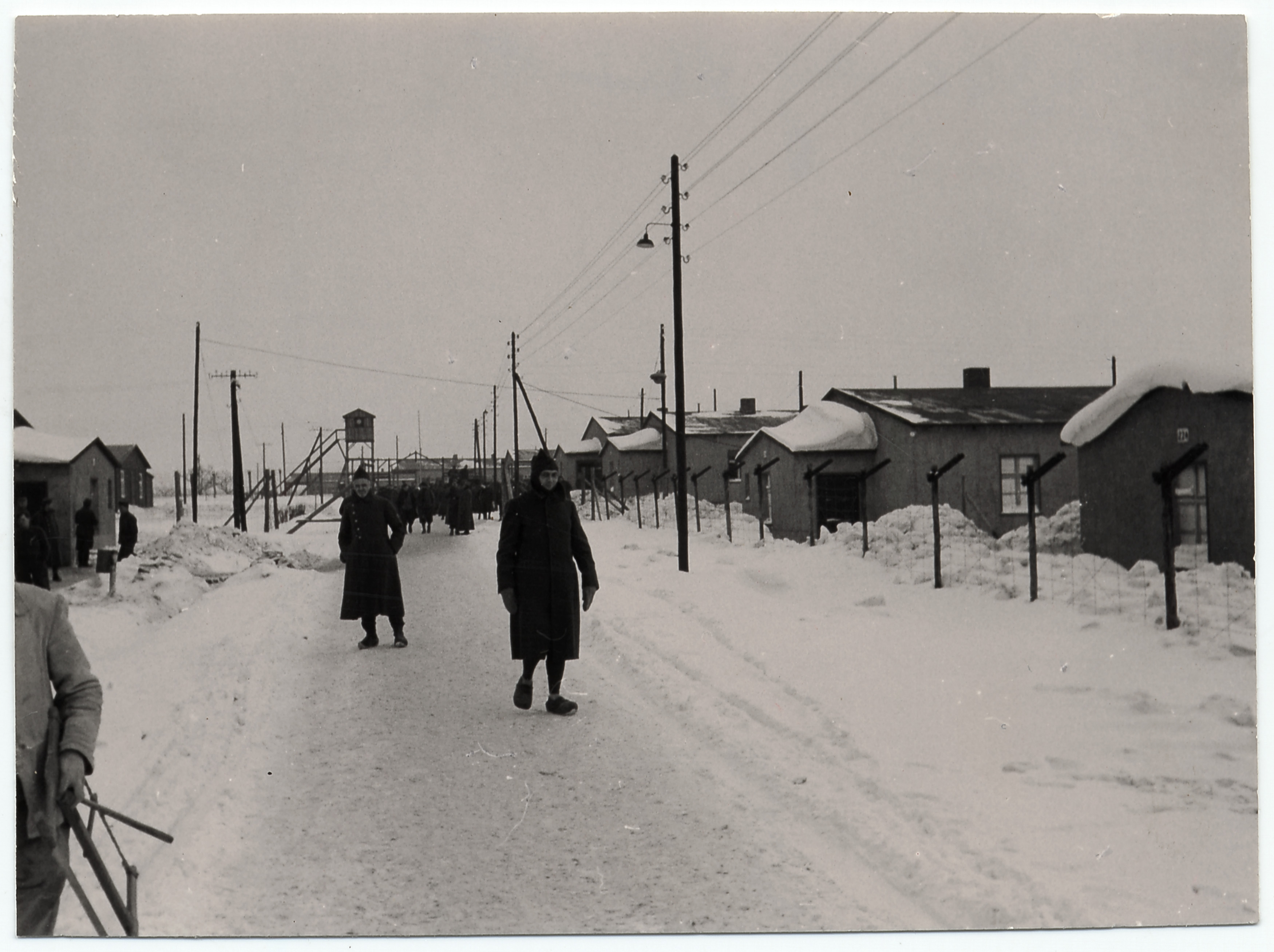
View of a German prison camp, Stalag VIII-A, in Görlitz

Initially most French prisoners were detained in France, but after repeated escapes, the Germans decided to move the vast majority to new camps in Germany and Eastern Europe.

Conditions in camps varied considerably geographically and over time. Conditions were particularly poor in the summer of 1940, when facilities proved insufficient to accommodate the large number of new POWs, and in the particularly cold winter that same year. Gradually, as prisoners were repatriated, relieving overcrowding, conditions generally improved. From 1943, however, as the war on the Eastern Front turned against Germany, conditions worsened and the food supply became more precarious. Some camps were purpose-built, like Stalag II-D, but others could be former barracks, asylums or fortresses.

Prisoners were generally divided into camp by rank. Officers, given different status to other ranks, were imprisoned in Oflags (short for Offizierslager or "Officers' Camp") while NCOs and other ranks were imprisoned in Stalags (or Stammlager, "Main Camp"). Each Stalag included numerous Arbeitskommandos (work units) outside the camp itself, some of which could be hundreds of kilometers away. The vast majority of prisoners (c. 93 percent) were not confined behind barbed wire, but instead worked in German factories or in farms, sometimes without guards.

Prisoners arriving in camps were divided into groups by the Germans. Mostly, this consisted of bringing soldiers of similar backgrounds (Communists, Jews or Bretons) together for administrative purposes and to limit their interaction with other prisoners. Although this sorting of soldiers generally occurred on a small scale only, a camp was established at Lübeck for French prisoners dubbed "enemies of the Reich", where they could be detained in isolation. Prisoners considered rebellious, however, were often sent to special camps in which conditions were extremely poor.

=== Daily life ===
Within Stalags and Oflags, prisoners had substantial amounts of leisure time. Letters and parcels from home could take months to arrive in camps and be distributed by the Red Cross; consequently, most had little regular contact with their families. The Red Cross also provided food, books, sports equipment and musical instruments, as well as information and letters. Thanks to the access to books, the historian Fernand Braudel wrote most of his influential work La Méditerranée et le monde méditerranéen à l'époque de Philippe II (1949), which established the analytical concept of the longue durée, while in captivity in Germany.

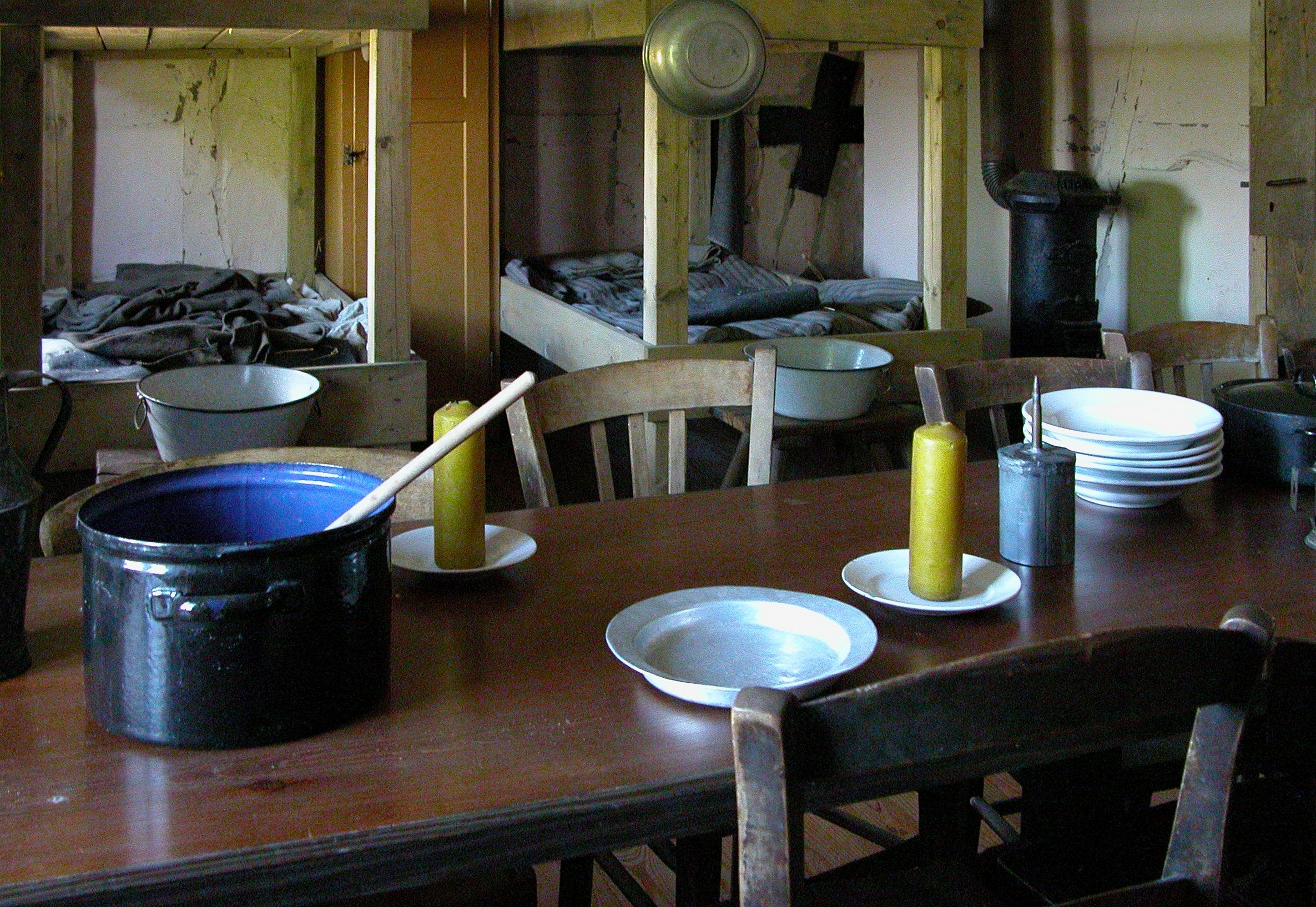
Reconstructed living quarters of French prisoners at Roscheider Hof Open Air Museum near Trier

Numerous clubs, bands, sports teams and societies operated within the camps. In Stalag IX-A, French prisoners established both symphony and jazz orchestras and a choir. An informal "temporary university" was also established in the same camp. The future French President François Mitterrand delivered a series of lectures on the ancien régime to his fellow prisoners in another camp. Jean-Paul Sartre also delivered lectures on philosophy. Drama was also extremely popular and, despite only having very limited resources, numerous plays were staged.

Politically, the prisoners of war in Germany were given virtually more freedom than civilians in occupied France. In accordance with the Geneva Conventions, French prisoners elected hommes de confiance (Men of trust) from among their number to represent their interests. The Germans attempted to encourage prisoners to adopt Nazi or collaborationist ideologies, even supporting the creation of a pro-German newspaper, Le Trait d'Union, for prisoners and pro-Vichy Cercles Pétain groups existed in many separate camps. Although Pétain was generally supported by the prisoners, Pierre Laval who was Petain's de facto Prime Minister was extremely unpopular. Laval's re-promotion in 1942 following his dismissal in December 1940, together with the failure of his Relève system, widely undermined support for Vichy among prisoners.

=== Work and forced labour ===
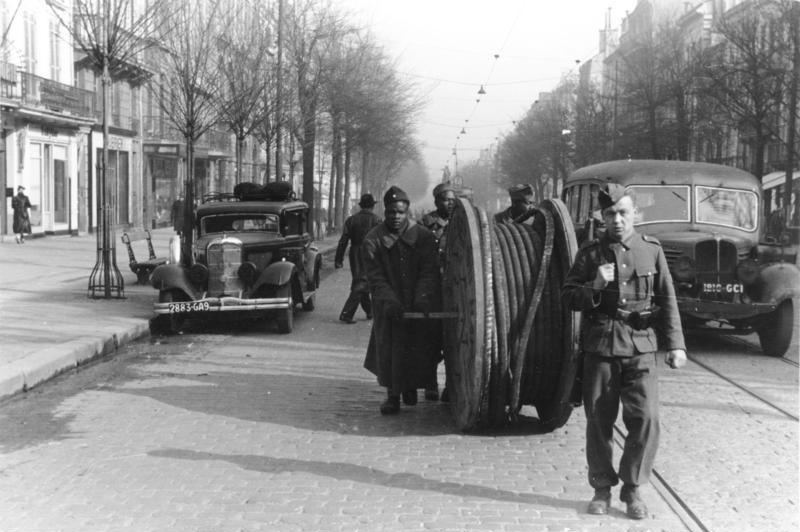
French colonial prisoners working under guard in southern France, 1942

Most French prisoners of war were not held in camps for most of the war, but instead, over 93 percent of French prisoners of war lived and worked on Kommandos of work details. Under the terms of the Geneva Convention NCOs were, like officers, exempted from work during captivity, but Germans often forced them to work. Workers were fed but virtually their entire wages were paid directly to the German army and prisoners were only allowed to retain 70 pfennigs per day.

Work Kommandos were very variable, but those in agriculture were generally considered better than ones in factories or mining, where conditions were worse and prisoners were vulnerable to Allied bombing raids. In rural areas of Germany, French prisoners replaced locals conscripted into the German army as agricultural labourers. Guarding Kommandos came to be regarded as an unnecessary waste of manpower - it was thought unlikely that a prisoner would attempt to escape in a country where he did not know the language. This meant that, in practice, prisoners were allowed a wider measure of freedom compared to the camps. They were often viewed with curiosity by the German rural population, and the French prisoners were often allowed to mix quite freely with German civilians. Although unlawful, many French prisoners began relationships with German women.

=== African and Asian prisoners ===
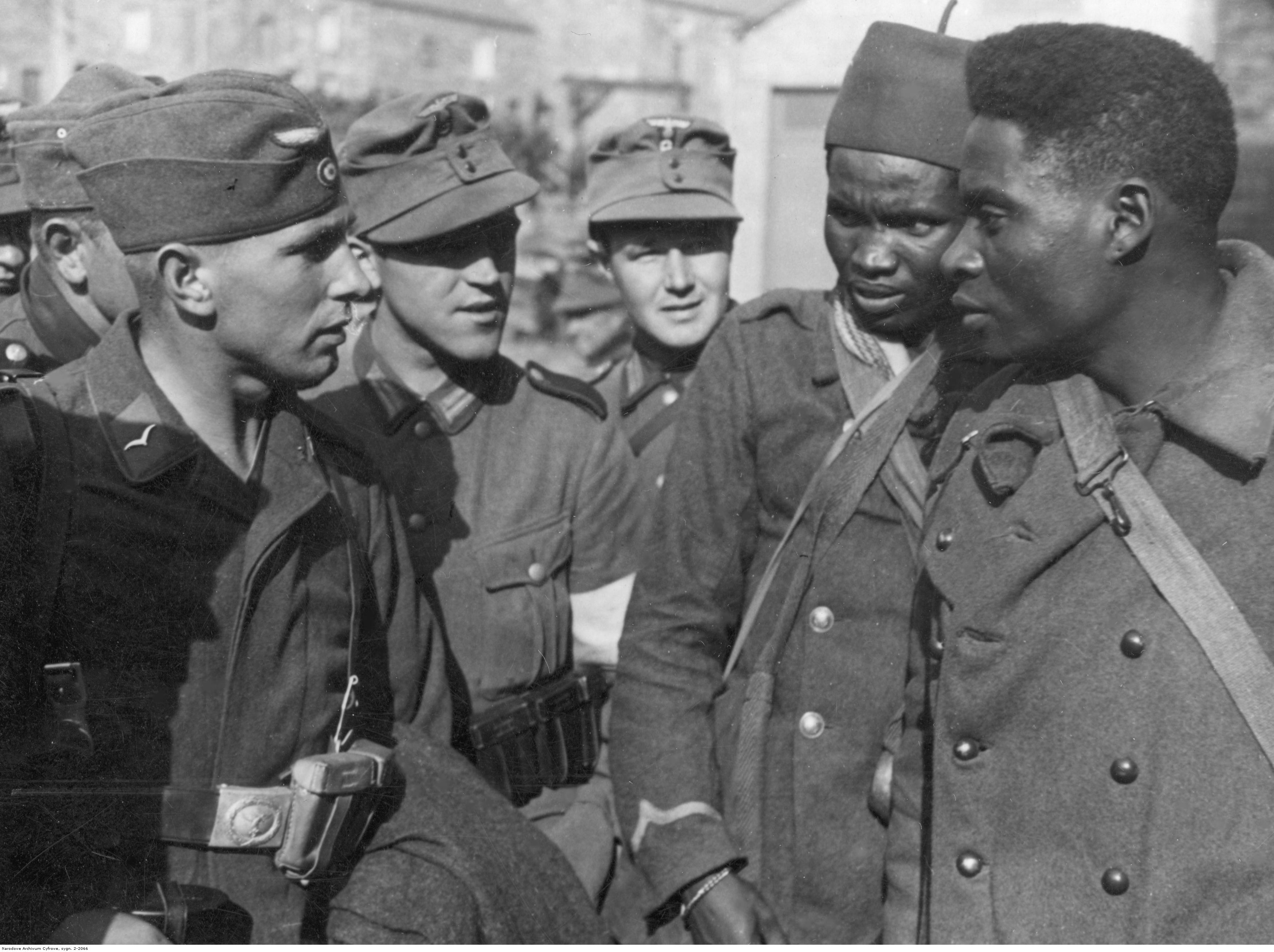
German soldiers with prisoners from French West Africa.

Around 120,000 prisoners from the French colonies were captured during the Battle of France. Most of these troops, around two-thirds, came from the French North African possessions of Tunisia, Morocco and, particularly, Algeria. Around 20 percent were from French West Africa. The rest were from Madagascar and Indochina. Influenced by Nazi racial ideology, German troops summarily killed between 1,000 and 1,500 black prisoners during the Battle of France. Among those captured who narrowly escaped execution was Léopold Sédar Senghor, an academic who would become the first President of independent Senegal in 1960.

Unlike their white compatriots, the colonial prisoners of war were imprisoned in Frontstalags in France rather than being brought to Germany. By keeping colonial soldiers in France on the pretext of preventing the spread of tropical diseases, the Germans also wanted to prevent the "racial defilement" (Rassenschande) of German women outlawed by the Nuremberg Laws of 1935. Black troops were treated worse than their white compatriots, and some of them were used for "degrading" anthropological experiments or subjects of medical testing into diseases. Although the living conditions for black soldiers gradually improved, they were still considerably lower than those of white French soldiers. The mortality rate among black soldiers was also considerably higher.

Some colonial troops were repatriated before the end of the war. Around 10,000 North African prisoners were released in 1941. Escapes and repatriations reduced the number of colonial prisoners of war to 30,000 by July 1944. With the Allied advance through France in 1944, between 10–12,000 prisoners were transported to Stalags in Germany where they were held until the end of the war. Former colonial prisoners of war were demobilised in 1944 but received less compensation than their white counterparts. A mutiny among former prisoners at Thiaroye in French Senegal on 30 November 1944 was repressed with violence.

== Other prisoners of war ==
During the Battle of the Alps, 154 French soldiers were captured by the Italians. These prisoners were forgotten during the armistice negotiations, and the final agreement makes no mention of them. They were held at the POW camp in Fonte d'Amore in Sulmona, along with 600 Greeks and 200 Britons, treated, by all accounts, in accordance with the laws of war. Their fate is unknown after Italy's armistice with the Allies, when they presumably came under German control.

The Allies captured 38,000 Vichy French soldiers in the Syria–Lebanon campaign in June 1941. The prisoners of war were offered the choice of joining the Free French or being repatriated to France. Only 5,668 men volunteered to join the Free French; the remainder chose to be repatriated. According to a statement given by Winston Churchill to the House of Commons on 10 November 1942, "upwards of 1,000 prisoners" loyal to Vichy were taken by the British during October in the Madagascar campaign. The intention of the British was again to repatriate those POWs who did not wish to join the Free French, perhaps in exchange for British officers interned in France.

Following the Japanese occupation of French Indochina, about 4,500 French prisoners were confined in a makeshift prison established at the Citadel of Hanoi in northern Vietnam. Inside its makeshift hospital, where sanitation and medical services were lacking, about half a dozen died every day.

== Repatriation ==
=== Wartime repatriation ===
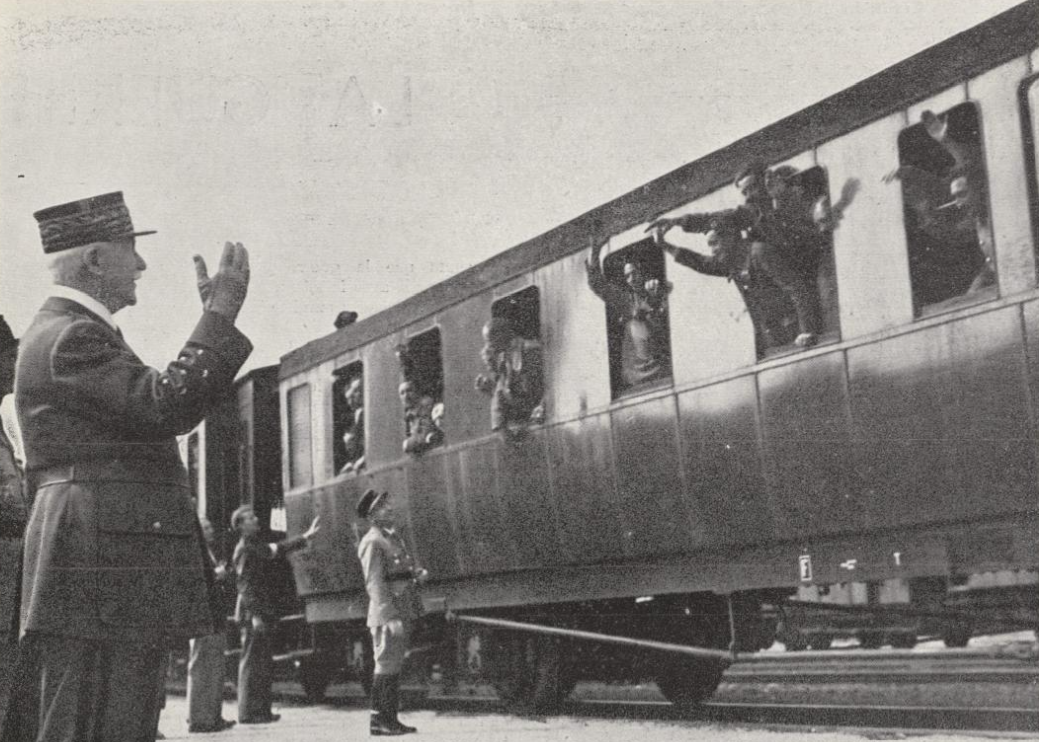
Pétain greeting a train of repatriated prisoners of war. The prisoners of war became the focus of an intense Vichy propaganda effort that portrayed them as a vanguard of the National Revolution.

Initially, following the armistice, it was rumoured that all French troops would be soon returned by the Germans. Petain tasked Georges Scapini, a World War I veteran and a pro-German member of the Chamber of Deputies, to negotiate the release of hostages. Scapini initially argued to the Germans that the transfer of prisoners as a goodwill gesture would ensure French public support for the Axis occupation and the Vichy regime. From his contacts with the German Ambassador Otto Abetz and Hermann Reinecke of the OKW, however, he realized that the prisoners were to be used as a bargaining chip to ensure French collaboration, and that a full transfer of French prisoners would be impossible. After the expulsion of 100,000 Jews from Lorraine was ordered by its Gauleiter Josef Bürckel, Hitler would make the concession of allowing France to assume the protecting power for its own prisoners of war. This was also because the previous protecting power of France, the United States, began to sympathize with Britain and after its diplomatic staff became too small to conduct routine inspections of German prison camps.

From the autumn of 1940, the Germans began to repatriate French reservists whose private occupations were in short supply in Vichy France, such as medical workers like doctors and nurses along with postmen and gendarmes. In 1941, after lobbying by the Vichy government, the policy was extended to French veterans of World War I and fathers of four or more children. Individual prisoners with good contacts could also be requested for repatriation. In practice, this meant that a disproportionate number of prisoners who were released early came from the upper classes.

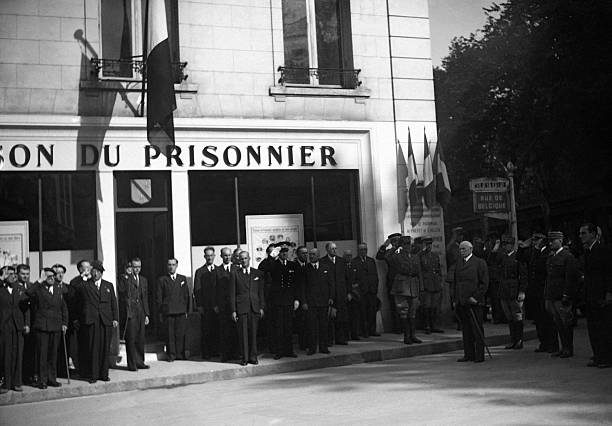
Pétain presides over the inauguration of the Maison du Prisonnier at Vichy in 1942

In 1941, the Germans introduced the Flamenpolitik, intended to divide German-occupied Belgium by favouring Dutch speakers over French ones. In February 1941, repatriation of Flemish prisoners began. At the time, Dutch dialects were still widely spoken in French Flanders and, although Belgian prisoners were primarily targeted by the policy, some French prisoners were also released as a result.

The reintegration of French prisoners into civilian life was facilitated by a network of Maisons du Prisonnier (Prisoner Houses), established across France, which would help them readjust and find work. Generally, prisoners found it easy to regain their pre-war jobs because of the shortage of labour. The government had hoped that returning prisoners of war would be more sympathetic to the Vichy regime, but prisoners coming back were not noticeably more loyal to Vichy than other groups.

==== The relève (1942) ====
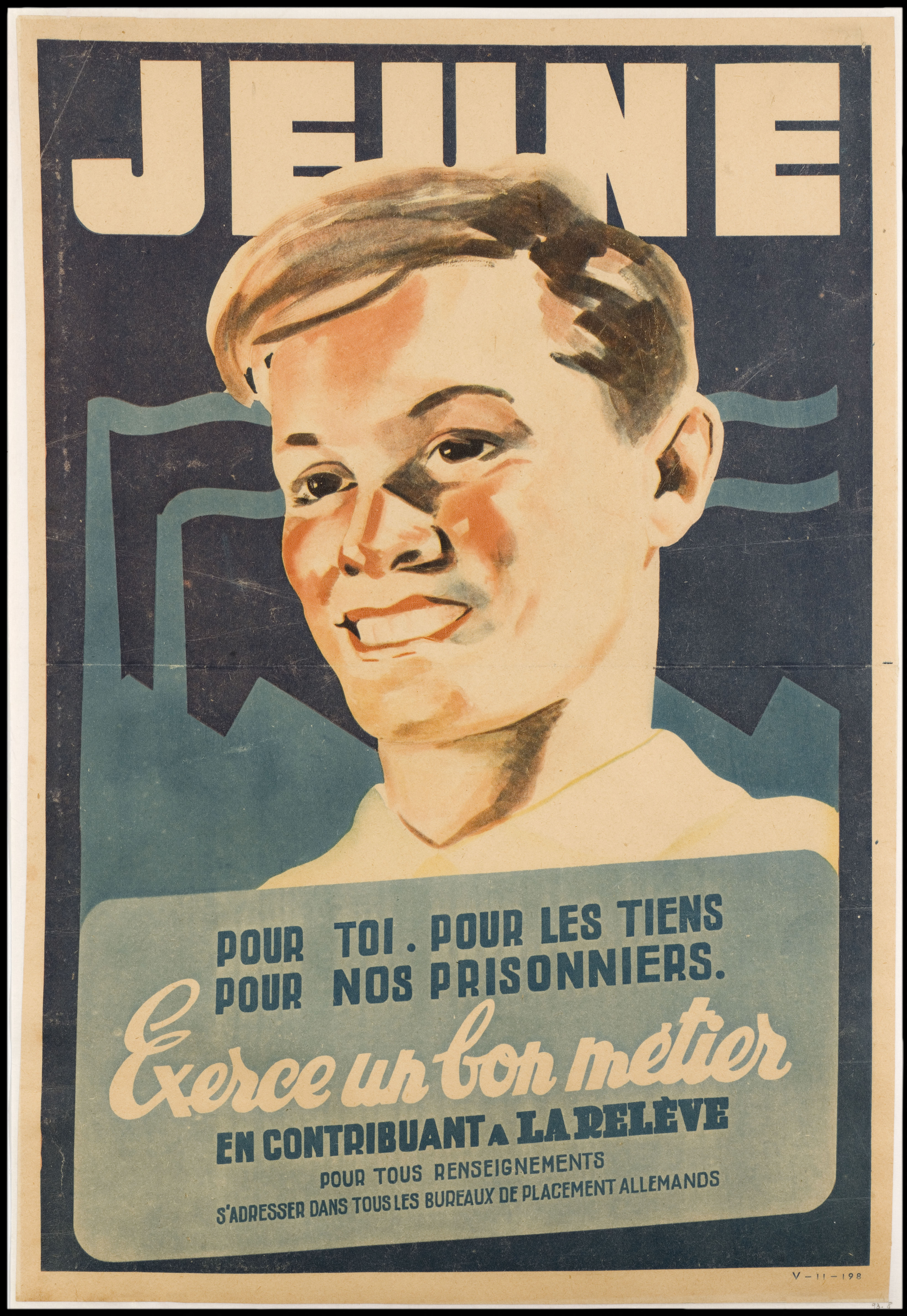
Propaganda poster calling for French youths to volunteer for the relève "for yourself, for your family, for our prisoners".

The relève (relief) was a policy championed by Pierre Laval in which, in exchange for French workers volunteering to work in Germany, a proportional number of prisoners would be released. The policy was announced in June 1942 and soon became extremely unpopular and divisive across French society, and among the prisoners themselves. The Vichy government had originally hoped that a much greater number of prisoners would be released under the scheme, but the Germans refused to repatriate prisoners in the proportions which Vichy had suggested. In the end, around 100,000 prisoners were repatriated under the scheme. Many, however, were old or sick prisoners who the Germans were often keen to release from custody in any event due to their inability to work (and who technically should have been released under earlier quotas) rather than peasant soldiers portrayed by Vichy propaganda.

The failure of the relève to attract sufficient numbers of French workers led to its abandonment in favour of the forced Service du travail obligatoire (STO; "Obligatory Work Service") in 1943.

==== Transformation (1943) ====
The implementation of forced labour deportations from France was accompanied by a new policy in 1943. For every French worker who arrived in Germany, one POW could be "transformed" into a "free worker" (travailleur libre). Prisoners had the option and could choose to be transformed from being a prisoner of war to become a free worker in a German factory. Around 221,000 prisoners joined the scheme. The policy benefited the Germans, for whom the prisoners were a good source of extra labour, but it meant they were also able to transfer to the front German soldiers guarding POW camps, freeing 30,000 of them as a result of the policy.

=== Escape ===
Although the exact number of French prisoners who escaped from captivity in Germany is unknown, it has been estimated at around 70,000, representing approximately five per cent of all French prisoners. The Vichy government did not encourage prisoners to escape, but many of its officials were sympathetic to escapees who reached French territory. Some prisoners, particularly those working in agriculture, spent substantial amounts of time without guards, and prisoners caught by the Germans trying to escape were rarely severely punished. During the period of detention in France, fines were sometimes imposed on locals for mass escapes of prisoners in the region. It was partially to prevent escapes that led to the German decision to deport prisoners to the Reich.

As sick prisoners were often repatriated, many faked illness in an attempt to return home. From 1941, when those in certain occupations were repatriated, others produced fake identification documents to enable them to be released.

Among the escapees was Henri Giraud, a French General who had commanded a division in 1940, who escaped from Königstein prison and, despite his pro-Vichy sympathies, joined the Free French in 1943. Jean-Paul Sartre also managed to escape by forging papers demonstrating that he had a disability, leading to his repatriation.

== Effects in occupied France ==
=== Vichy and prisoner of war relief ===
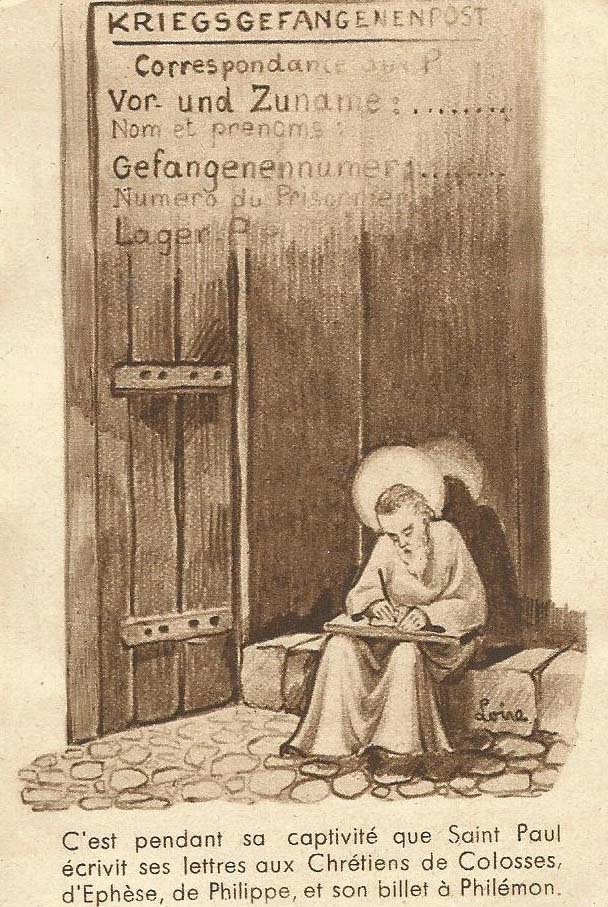
Prisoners were often depicted as martyrs in propaganda. Here, St Paul's captivity is compared to that of the French prisoners. (Note: The image depicts St Paul in a prison cell. At the top of the picture is the template for letters written by prisoners of war (Kriegsgefangenenpost), with the caption "it was during his captivity that St Paul wrote his letters (epistles) to the Christian Colossians, Ephesians, the Philippians and the epistle to Philemon.")

The continued imprisonment of French soldiers was a major theme in Vichy propaganda. Prisoners of war featured in the programme of moral rejuvenation promised as part of the Révolution nationale (National Revolution). A recurring idea was the idea of prisoners of war as martyrs or penitents, suffering in order to redeem France from its pre-war excesses. The period of detainment was therefore depicted as a form of purification which would overcome internal divides within France and atone for the defeat of 1940.

The government sponsored numerous initiatives aimed at improving conditions or achieving repatriation. At the request of the Vichy government, Georges Scapini, a deputy and World War I veteran, was appointed to lead a committee to monitor the treatment of French prisoners in Germany. Scapini's Service Diplomatique des Prisonniers de Guerre (Prisoners of War Diplomatic Service; SDPG) was given responsibility to negotiate with the German authorities in all matters concerning prisoners of war. A government-backed national fund-raising campaign was run by the Secours National (National Aid) for the benefit of French prisoners. Among other activities, the Secours ran a week-long campaign nationally in 1941.

At a local level, many communities ran independent initiatives to raise money for their local community's prisoners, often organised around communities or churches, which held prayer days for POWs. These campaigns were immensely successful, and despite German restrictions on public gatherings, French civilians were able to raise large collections from lotteries and sponsored sports matches. These local prisoner relief schemes were "among the greatest stimulants of sociability under the occupation" and helped to foster a sense of community. Infighting along political and social lines did however occur in local aid committees, and there were also numerous cases of corruption and theft from local funds. Later in the war, the Vichy government increasingly tried to take control of local fund-raising, but this was often resisted by the local groups themselves.

In order to show solidarity with their relations in France, prisoners also raised funds among themselves to send back to their native regions if they had been targeted by Allied strategic bombing or food shortages.

=== Effect on relationships ===
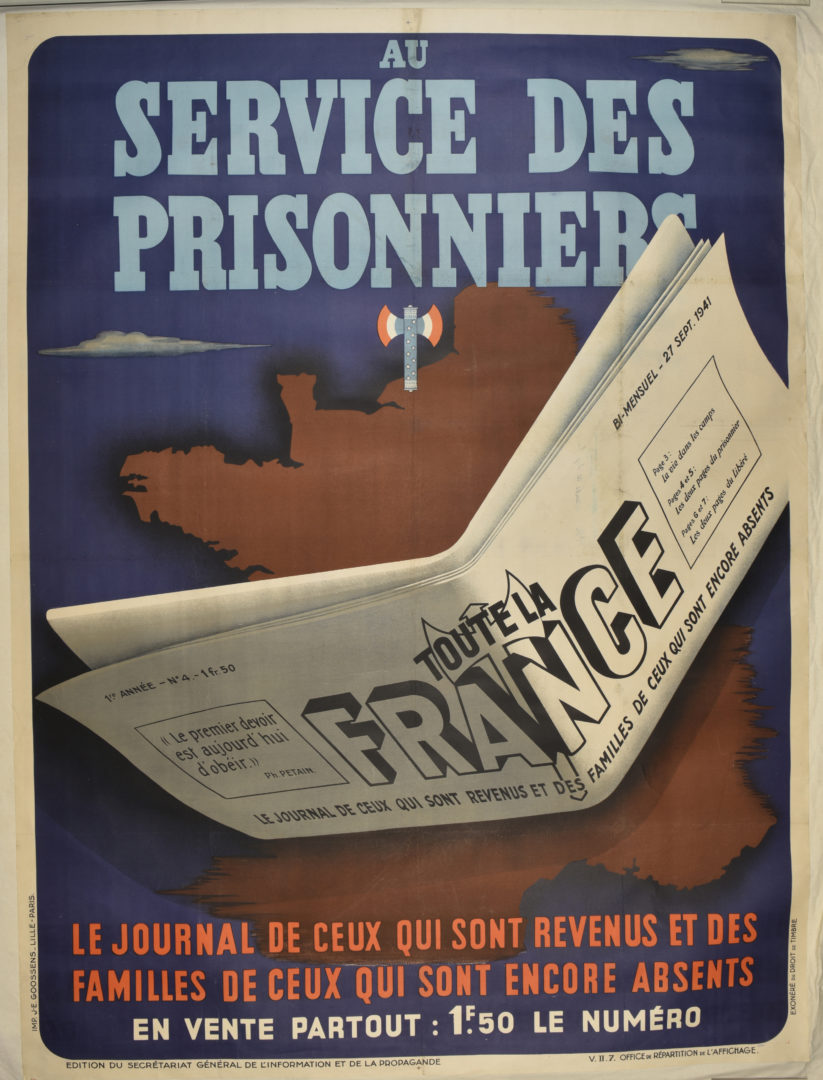
Poster advertising the newspaper Toute la France, billed as "the newspaper of those who have returned and the families of those who are still absent"

Initially, there was considerable confusion among families with members serving in the army. It took several months for relations and friends to discover the fate of their relatives and name of casualties. Initially, only very few prisoners, usually those working in important civilian industries, were sent back to France.

For wives and families of prisoners of war, life under the occupation was particularly hard. In pre-war France, the husband was generally the household's chief wage earner, so many households saw a sharp drop in income and living standards.

Only very small allowances were made by the government to families of POWs, which was not sufficient to offset the economic difficulties caused. The large proportion of men in prisoner of war camps changed the gender balance in jobs. Many women took over running family farms and businesses, and others were forced to look for employment.

The prisoners of war also posed a big problem for Vichy's policy of moral rejuvenation summarised in its motto Travail, famille, patrie (Work, family, homeland). From October 1940, Vichy attempted to limit women's access to work which had particular effects on prisoners' families. Because of the emphasis on family values under Vichy, the government was especially worried about infidelity among the wives of prisoners in Germany. Concerned about prisoners' wives having babies, the law of 15 February 1942 made abortion a treasonable offence that carried the death penalty. For having administered 27 abortions, Marie-Louise Giraud was guillotined on 30 July 1942. In December 1942, a law was issued making cohabitation with wives of prisoners of war illegal. The government also made divorce much harder and officially made adultery an insufficient reason for legal separation in order to stop suspicious POWs divorcing their wives in France. Wives of prisoners who had had affairs were also often demonised by their local communities who considered it equivalent to prostitution. Generally, however, Vichy's moral legislation had little real effect.

== Aftermath and legacy ==
It has been estimated that 37,000 French soldiers died in the German captivity. Their mortality rate estimates range from 1-2.8%, one of the lowest in WW2.

From the early repatriations, returned prisoners were generally treated with pity, suspicion and disdain by French civilians. Many believed that they had only been allowed to return in exchange for agreeing to collaborate. Later Vichy propaganda had implied that prisoners lived in good conditions, so many civilians believed that the prisoners had suffered much less than civilians during the conflict. As veterans of the 1940 Battle of France, the prisoners were blamed for the French defeat and portrayed as cowards who had surrendered, rather than fight to the death. They were also unfavourably compared with other men of their generation who had served in the Free French Forces or Resistance.

Prisoners had little effect on the resistance in France. Initially there were three resistance networks based around repatriated prisoners split along political lines, but in March 1944, the three merged to form the National Movement of Prisoners of War and Deportees.

After the war, there was a decade-long period of divisive debate about whether POWs should be considered as veterans, therefore making them eligible for a veteran's card with its accompanying benefits, but this was not resolved until the 1950s. A national organization of former prisoners was established, under the name Fédération nationale des combattants prisonniers de guerre (National Federation of Prisoner of War Veterans), which campaigned for the rights of former POWs. French prisoners were banned by a court from referring to themselves as "deportees" which had been exclusively applied to political prisoners and Holocaust victims.

No medal for prisoners was ever established, although the Médaille des Évadés (Escapees' Medal) was awarded to almost 30,000 prisoners who had escaped from camps in Germany.

The topic of French prisoners of war was relatively under-researched in French historiography and of little interested to the general public for many years. The first monograph dedicated to this was Yves Durand’s La Captivité, published in 1980. In popular culture, the first major treatment of this was the comedic film La Vache et le prisonnier (1959) directed by Henri Verneuil.

== See also ==
- Belgian prisoners of war in World War II
- German mistreatment of Soviet prisoners of war
- Liberation of France
- Prisoners of war in World War II

== Citations ==
=== Bibliography ===
- D'Hoop, Jean-Marie (July 1987). "Les prisonniers français et la communauté rurale allemande (1940–1945)". Guerres Mondiales et Conflits Contemporains (147): 31–47. ISSN 0984-2292. JSTOR 25730420.
- Fishman, Sarah (1991). "Grand Delusions: The Unintended Consequences of Vichy France's Prisoner of War Propaganda". Journal of Contemporary History. 26 (2): 229–54. doi:10.1177/002200949102600203. ISSN 0022-0094. JSTOR 260790. S2CID 159826200.
- Gildea, Robert (2002). Marianne in Chains: In Search of the German Occupation, 1940–1945 (1st ed.). London: Macmillan. ISBN 0-333-78230-5.
- Jackson, Julian (2001). France: The Dark Years, 1940–1944 (1st ed.). Oxford: Oxford University Press. ISBN 0-19-820706-9.
- Lewin, Christophe (July 1987). "Le Rétour des Prisonniers de Guerre Français (1945)". Guerres Mondiales et Conflits Contemporains (147): 49–79. ISSN 0984-2292. JSTOR 25730420.
- Mollo, Andrew (1987). The Armed Forces of World War II: Uniforms, Insignia, and Organization. New York: Military Press. ISBN 0-517-54478-4.
- Rochat, Giorgio (2008). "La campagne italienne de juin 1940 dans les Alpes occidentales". Revue historique des armées. 250: 77–84. doi:10.3917/rha.250.0077. ISSN 0035-3299.
- Scheck, Raffael (2008). Hitler's African Victims: the German Army Massacres of Black French Soldiers in 1940 (1st ed.). Cambridge: Cambridge University Press. ISBN 978-0-521-73061-7.
- Scheck, Raffael (2010). "French Colonial Soldiers in German Prisoner-of-War Camps (1940–1945)". French History. 24 (3): 420–46. doi:10.1093/fh/crq035. ISSN 0269-1191.
- Vinen, Richard (2006). The Unfree French: Life under the Occupation (1st ed.). London: Allen Lane. ISBN 0-7139-9496-7.
