= Belgium–China relations =

- Belgium: China

Belgium–China relations began in the early 1970s about 20 years after mainland China came under communist rule. The People's Republic of China (PRC) has an embassy in Brussels while Belgium has an embassy in Beijing and consulates in Guangzhou, Hong Kong and Shanghai.

== History ==
During the Korean War, the Belgian Volunteer Corps for Korea under the United Nations Command fought the PRC's People's Volunteer Army in multiple battles.

Diplomatic relations between the People's Republic of China and the Belgium were established on 25 October 1971. The diplomatic relationship began to improve and grow during the 1980s with visits from high-ranking governments from both sides such as Zhu Rongji in April 1991 and Vice-premier Qian Qichen in March 1992. From the Belgium side, Crown Prince Albert has visited China in May 1993 and the king of Belgium, Crown Prince Philippe visited in November 1996 and May 2000. The former prime ministers Jean-Luc Dehaene visited China in November 1998 and Prime Minister Guy Verhofstadt visited in March 2002.

China's Vice President Xi Jinping has been to Belgium in October 2009 to enhance bilateral cooperation in terms of trade, human and cultural exchanges.

The bilateral relationship has increased with economic trade between the two countries. Belgium has a pavilion in the Shanghai Expo 2010.

In July 2019, the UN ambassadors from 22 nations, including Belgium, signed a joint letter to the UNHRC condemning the Chinese government's persecution of the Uyghurs as well as its mistreatment of other minority groups, urging it to close the Xinjiang re-education camps.

In 2019 as punishment for visiting Taiwan President of the Senate Jacques Brotchi received a lifetime ban from entering China.

In June 2020, Belgium openly opposed the Hong Kong national security law.

=== Espionage ===
In December 2023, Belgian Prime Minister Alexander De Croo referred to China as a "sometimes very hostile" country following allegations that the Ministry of State Security had recruited Belgian politician Frank Creyelman for espionage.

In April 2024, the Belgian Foreign Ministry summoned the Chinese envoy after reports emerged that Chinese spies (APT31) hacked the laptops of key lawmakers such as the head of the Belgian Foreign Affairs Committee and former prime minister Guy Verhofstadt. In April 2025, Belgian media reported that Chinese intelligence attempted to coerce the mayor of Huy, Eric Dosogne, in 2020 to spy on Samuel Cogolati, a leader of Ecolo and prominent member of the Inter-Parliamentary Alliance on China. In October 2025, it was reported that Chinese state-backed advanced persistent threat group Mustang Panda had targeted Belgian and other European diplomats as part of a cyber-espionage campaign. In September 2026, Belgian authorities arrested a Chinese national suspected of espionage involving semiconductor technology.

== Trade ==
The trade between the two countries in 2013 came to a value of EUR20.2 billion. China is Belgium's sixth biggest trading partner which makes up 4.1% of Belgium's trade. The trade between the two countries in 2008 exceeded 20 billion and growing on average 20% every year.

== Chinese people in Belgium ==
Qian Xiuling (1912–2008), or Siou-Ling Tsien de Perlinghi, was an immigrant to Belgium from the Republic of China who helped to save nearly 100 Belgian people from execution by the Nazis during World War II. She won a medal in Belgium and had a street named after her.

== See also ==
- Foreign relations of Belgium
- Foreign relations of China
- Chinese people in Belgium
- China–EU relations
