= List of protected heritage sites in Écaussinnes =

This table shows an overview of the protected heritage sites in the Walloon town Écaussinnes. This list is part of Belgium's national heritage.

Object	Year/architect	Town/section	Address	Coordinates	Number^{?}	Image
Castle Folie, with a chapel, kitchen, walls and ceiling of the library, and the ensemble of the castle, outbuildings and park ^{(nl)} ^{(fr)}		Écaussinnes		50.573807°N 4.180211°E	55050-CLT-0002-01 Info	Kasteel van Follie, met kapel, keuken, muren, plafond van de bibliotheek, en het ensemble van het kasteel, de bijgebouwen en het park
Church Sainte-Aldegonde, except the tower and the aisles of the 18th century ^{(nl)} ^{(fr)}		Écaussinnes		50.570952°N 4.181082°E	55050-CLT-0003-01 Info	
Church Sainte-Aldegonde, the facades and roofs of the presbytery, and the ensemble of the church, the rectory and environment ^{(nl)} ^{(fr)}		Écaussinnes		50.570694°N 4.180850°E	55050-CLT-0004-01 Info	
Ensemble castle / fort-Écaussinnes Lalaing ^{(nl)} ^{(fr)}		Écaussinnes		50.568322°N 4.176741°E	55050-CLT-0005-01 Info	Ensemble kasteel/fort Écaussinnes-Lalaing
Castle garden Écaussinnes-Lalaing and the ensemble of the castle, the garden, adjacent fortified farm and the environment ^{(nl)} ^{(fr)}		Écaussinnes		50.567053°N 4.176485°E	55050-CLT-0006-01 Info	
Ensemble comprehensive chapel "Notre-Dame de Liesse and the surrounding areas ^{(nl)} ^{(fr)}		Écaussinnes	Scoufleny	50.564522°N 4.191444°E	55050-CLT-0007-01 Info	
Chapel Notre-Dame de Liesse ^{(nl)} ^{(fr)}		Écaussinnes	Scouflény	50.564516°N 4.191620°E	55050-CLT-0008-01 Info	
Hydraulic Combreuil mill, the wheel and the supporting parts, and the ensemble of the mill and its surroundings ^{(nl)} ^{(fr)}		Écaussinnes		50.592951°N 4.200074°E	55050-CLT-0009-01 Info	
Ensemble, comprising the area around the mill of Combreuil, classified by Executive Decree of April 27, 1990, extended with the cadastral parcels (1ère division, Écaussinnes d'Enghien, Section C d n ° s 244 et 249 p) ^{(nl)} ^{(fr)}		Écaussinnes		50.593256°N 4.201323°E	55050-CLT-0010-01 Info	
The stained glass windows and painted vault of the chapel of the castle of Folie ^{(nl)} ^{(fr)}		Écaussinnes	Écaussinnes d'Enghien	50.573807°N 4.180211°E	55050-PEX-0001-01 Info	
Ensemble of the buildings of the castle-fortress-Lalaing Écaussinnes ^{(nl)} ^{(fr)}		Écaussinnes		50.568322°N 4.176741°E	55050-PEX-0002-01 Info	Ensemble van de gebouwen van kasteel-fort Écaussinnes-Lalaing
Castle garden Écaussinnes-Lalaing and the ensemble of the castle, the garden, adjacent fortified farm and surroundings ^{(nl)} ^{(fr)}		Écaussinnes		50.567053°N 4.176485°E	55050-PEX-0003-01 Info	

== See also ==
- List of protected heritage sites in Hainaut (province)
- Écaussinnes
