= Chinese people in Belgium =

Belgian citizens of Chinese ancestry

比利時華人 Chinezen in België (Dutch) Diaspora chinoise en Belgique (French) Chinesische Belgien (German)
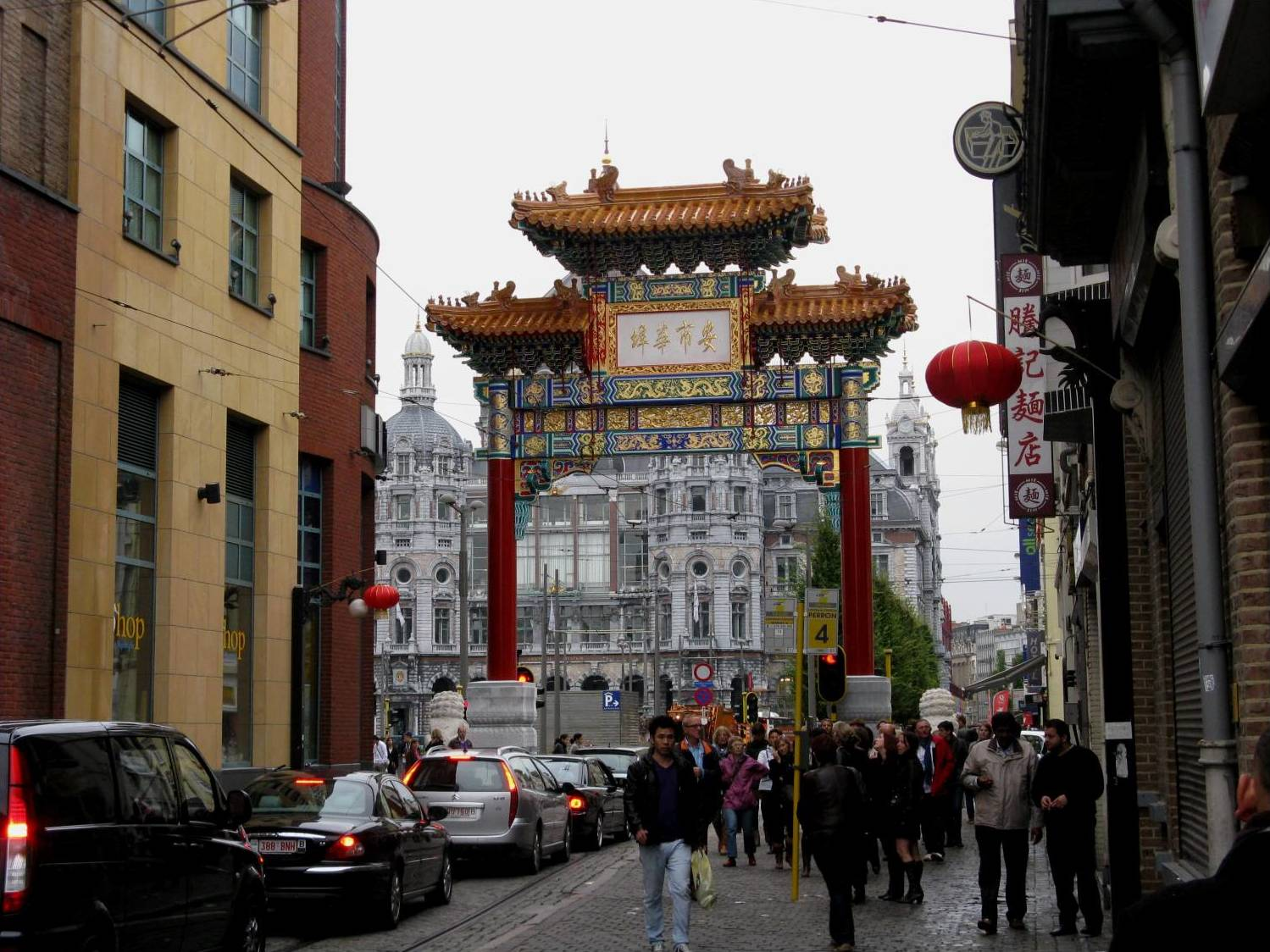
- Chinatown Antwerp

Total population
- 14,490 (2024); Around 30,000 to 40,000

Regions with significant populations
- Brussels • Antwerp • Leuven

Languages
- Dutch • French • German Cantonese • Mandarin various other Chinese dialects Vietnamese • Indonesian to some extent

Religion
- Irreligion • Buddhism • Chinese folk religion • Taoism • Confucianism • Christianity

Related ethnic groups
- Overseas Chinese

Chinese people in Belgium or Chinese Belgians (simplified Chinese: 比利时华侨; Traditional Chinese: 比利時華僑; pinyin: Bǐlìshí huáqiáo) are Belgian citizens of Chinese ancestry. There is a small ethnic Chinese community in Belgium, compared to neighbouring Netherlands, Germany and France.

== History ==
Single male sailors who wished to reestablish their lives in a foreign country made up the first Chinese living in Belgium. Beginning in the 1950s people from the New Territories of Hong Kong began to settle Europe. They moved due to a lack of jobs in Hong Kong and political developments in mainland China. Chinese people arrived until the end of the 1960s.

== Demographics ==
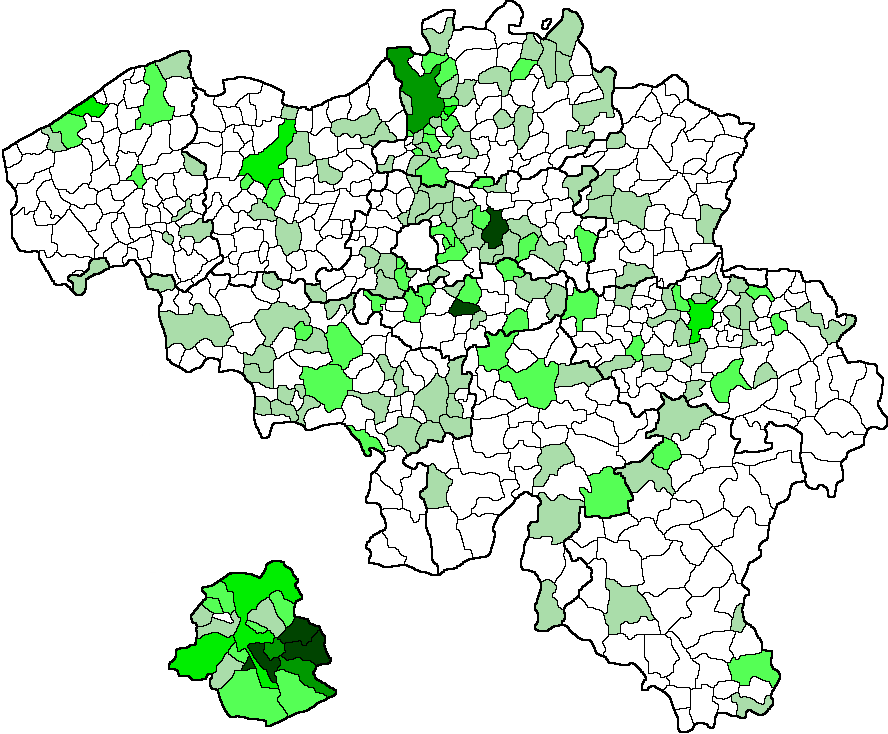

Since 1994, Belgium had 3,463 persons with mainland Chinese citizenship, including 1,788 females and 1,675 males; and 489 persons with Republic of China (Taiwan) citizenship, including (278 females and 115 males). However, as of 1998 most Chinese in Belgium originated in Hong Kong. Prior to 1997 were counted as "British" when they arrived, and by 1998 many had naturalized as Belgian citizens. Therefore, they were not counted as ethnic Chinese people living in Belgium. Pang Ching Lin (彭靜蓮, Pinyin: Péng Jìnglián), author of "Invisible Visibility: Intergenerational Transfer of Identity and Social Position of Chinese Women in Belgium," stated that therefore there is a lack of records specifically tracking Chinese people, and therefore there is an element of invisibility.

In 2008, De Morgen reported that the total of Han Chinese living in Belgium are estimated to be around 30.000.

In 2017, there are 12.155 Chinese foreigners in Belgium. That number is only counted for those who are from the People's Republic of China and aren't counted to those who are naturalized. Ethnic Chinese people from other countries such as Hongkongers, Taiwanese and Chinese Singaporeans are not counted as well.

As of 2020, Vedia estimates the number of ethnic Chinese in Belgium at around 40.000.

== Institutions ==
There are multiple Chinese organisations in Belgium, but they do not regularly cooperate with one another. They sometimes cooperate during some political events supported by the mainland Chinese government and during the Mid-Autumn Festival and the Chinese New Year.

== Notable individuals ==
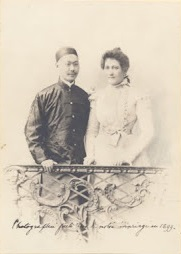
Lu Zhengxiang and Berthe Bovy

- Xavier Chen (1983), footballer
- Dion Cools (1996), footballer
- Dong Fangzhuo (1985), footballer
- Nadine Hwang (1902–1972), pilot
- Chaiyapol Julien Poupart (1990), model and actor
- Angeline Flor Pua (1995), model
- Bolis Pupul (born 1985 or 1986), musician
- Han Suyin (1916–2012), physician and author
- Lianne Tan (1990), badminton player
- Yuhan Tan (1987), badminton player
- Qian Xiuling (1913–2008), scientist who saved nearly 100 lives during World War II
- Lu Zhengxiang (1871–1949), diplomat and Roman Catholic priest
- Steven Wong (1988), BMX cyclist

== See also ==
- Belgium–China relations
- Chinese diaspora
- Immigration to Belgium
- Chinese diaspora in France
- Chinese people in Germany
- Chinese people in the Netherlands
