= Belgian prisoners of war in World War II =

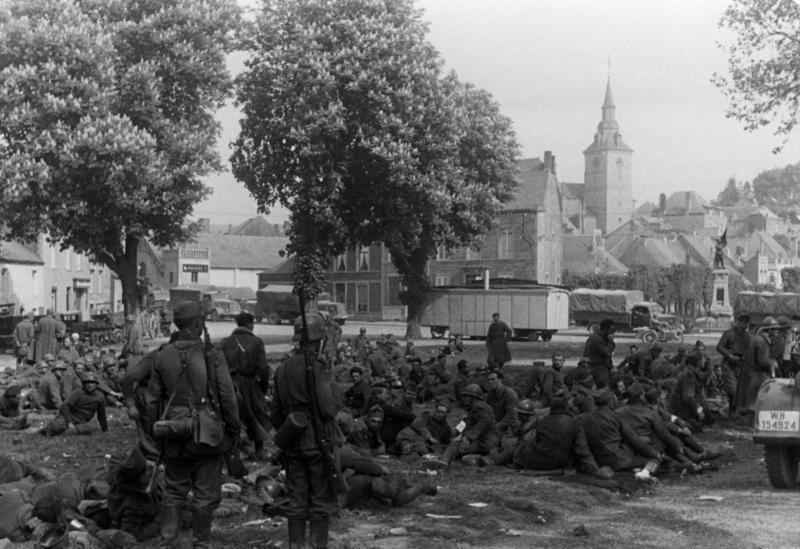
Captured Belgian soldiers under German guard in Couvin, May 1940

During World War II, Belgian prisoners of war (Note: In the national languages of Belgium, prisoners of war are known as prisonniers de guerre (commonly abbreviated to PG) in French and Krijgsgevangenen in Dutch.) were principally Belgian soldiers captured by the Germans during and shortly after the Battle of Belgium in May 1940.

225,000 men, approximately 30 percent of the strength of the Belgian army in 1940, were deported to prisoner of war camps in Germany. Large repatriations of prisoners, particularly of soldiers of Flemish origin, to occupied Belgium occurred in 1940 and 1941. Nevertheless, as many as 70,000 remained prisoners in captivity until 1945, and around 2,000 died in German camps during the course of the war.

== Background ==
Belgian involvement in World War II began when German forces invaded Belgium, which had been following a policy of neutrality, on 10 May 1940. After 18 days of fighting, Belgium surrendered on 28 May and was placed under German occupation. During the fighting, between 600,000 and 650,000 Belgian men (nearly 20% of the country's male population at the time) had served in the military. King Leopold III, who had commanded the army in 1940, also surrendered to the Germans on 28 May along and remained a prisoner for the rest of the war. The Belgian government fled first to Bordeaux in France, and then to London in the United Kingdom where it formed an official government in exile in October 1940. In Belgium, an occupation administration, the Military Administration in Belgium and Northern France, was established in Brussels to run the territory under Wehrmacht jurisdiction.

== Capture and deportation ==
Virtually all the soldiers of the Belgian army who were not killed in action were captured at some point during the fighting in May 1940, but most of these prisoners were either released unofficially at the end of hostilities or escaped from poorly-guarded compounds in Belgium and went home. Escaped prisoners who returned home were rarely arrested by the Germans, and there was no systematic attempt to recapture former Belgian soldiers who had left German captivity in 1940.

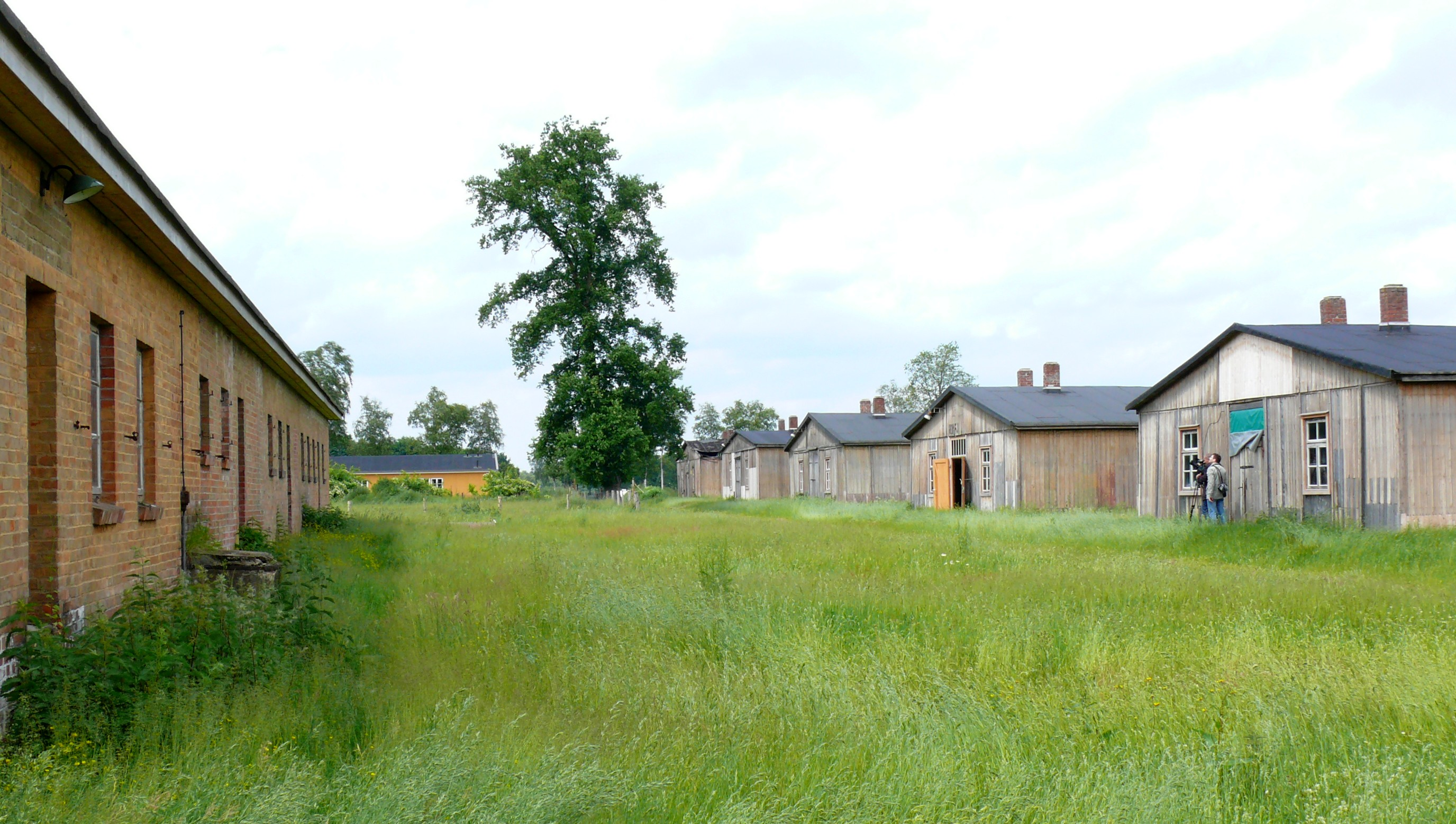
Modern-day view of a barracks at Stalag X-B at Sandbostel, where 1,700 Belgians were incarcerated.

Shortly after the Fall of France, the remaining Belgian soldiers in captivity were deported to prisoner-of-war camps (Kriegsgefangenenlager) in Germany, Austria and Poland. For the Germans, the Belgian prisoners represented a source of cheap labor which could be used in agriculture and factories after the conscription of most German workers. Belgian prisoners were again segregated by rank, with officers being sent to Oflags (an abbreviation for Offizierslager) and NCOs and other ranks being sent to Stalag (or Stammlager) camps.

Around 225,000 soldiers, representing around 30 percent of the total force mobilised in 1940, were deported in this way. Most of these soldiers were from the pre-war professional army, rather than conscripts mobilized in 1940. Most of those in captivity (around 145,000) were Flemish, with only 80,000 Walloons. The exact number of prisoners, however, is not known, and there are a variety of estimates. Most Belgian prisoners were forced to work in quarries or in agriculture. Conditions were variable, but around 2,000 died in captivity, mostly from diseases and lack of medical attention. Gradually, more prisoners were released, but around 64,000 Belgian soldiers were still in captivity by 1945, of whom just 2,000 were Flemish. According to estimates compiled for the Nuremberg Trials, 53,000 were still incarcerated in 1945 at the end of the war, but there could have been as many as 70,000 according to some estimates. Of the prisoners released in 1945, one quarter were suffering from debilitating diseases, particularly tuberculosis.

== Release and repatriation ==
=== Flamenpolitik ===
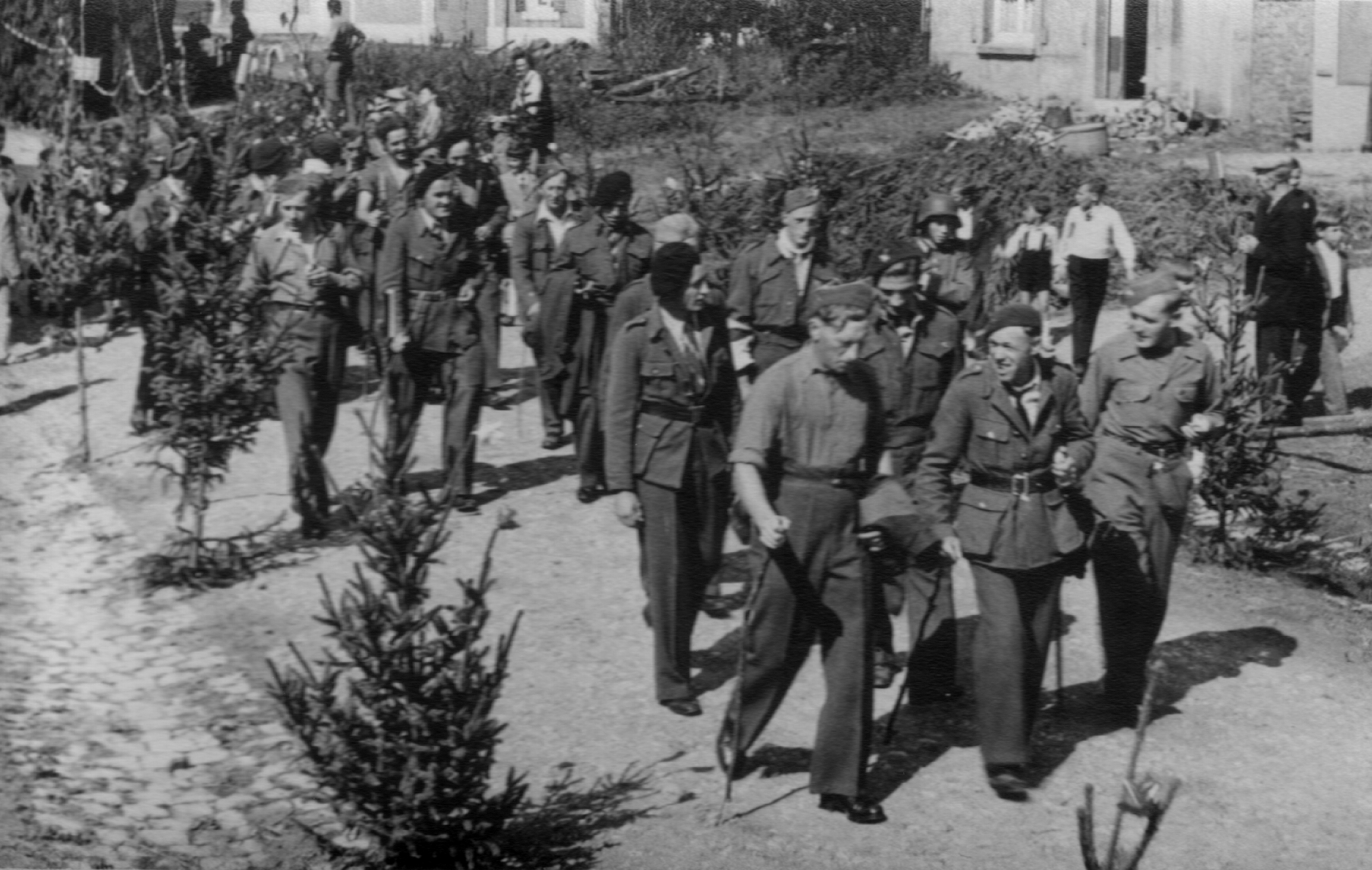
Repatriation of Belgian prisoners of war in Chiny, 1945

From the start of the detentions, the Nazi Party and Adolf Hitler were directly concerned in policy relating to the Belgian prisoners of war. From the start of the invasion, German soldiers had orders to segregate Flemish soldiers from their Walloon counterparts. The release of all Flemish soldiers already in captivity was ordered on 6 June 1940, but only had a limited real effect. The favourable treatment of Flemish prisoners of war formed part of the Flamenpolitik (Flemish Policy) and had an explicit racialist foundation, since Nazi ideology argued that the Flemish were "Germanic" and therefore racially superior to the Walloons. It also hoped to encourage Flemish people to view Germany more favourably, paving the way for an intended annexation of the Greater Netherlands into the Greater Germanic Reich (Großgermanisches Reich). The Germans began actively repatriating Flemish prisoners of war in August 1940. By February 1941, 105,833 Flemish soldiers had been repatriated.

=== Repatriation and escape ===
Initially, the German Military Administration in Belgium viewed the continued detention of all Belgian prisoners as temporary and undesirable. Both Alexander von Falkenhausen, head of the Military Administration, and Eggert Reeder, responsible for the civilian administration, viewed the continued detention and segregation of Belgian prisoners by ethnicity as unnecessarily divisive and harmful to civil order in Belgium. On 15 July 1940, the Military Administration even announced the imminent release of all Belgian prisoners, although this was later condemned as a mistake. The detention of prisoners who worked in specialist jobs in civilian life created numerous problems in Belgium until all prisoners in specialist occupations were released.

Because the Germans did not round up escaped prisoners once returned home, attempts to escape were relatively common. A total of 6,770 attempted escapes from camps in Germany are known.

== Effects in German-occupied Belgium ==
Charity collections in honor of the prisoners were common in occupied Belgium. The postal service in occupied Belgium issued sets of semi-postal stamps from 1942 "for the benefit of the prisoners of war" and their families.

== Post-war Recognition ==
A total of 165,000 soldiers received the brevet des prisonniers after the war, acknowledging their continued status as war veterans during their captivity. A medal, the Prisoner of War Medal 1940–1945, was established in 1947.

== See also ==
- L'Obstinée — a masonic lodge created by Belgian prisoners at Oflag XD
- French prisoners of war in World War II
- German mistreatment of Soviet prisoners of war
- Belgium in World War II
- Prisoners of war in World War II

== Citations ==
=== Bibliography ===
- Bailly, Michel (2 February 1990). "Forces et faiblesses de l'armée belge en 1940 à la veille de la guerre". Le Soir.
- Bailly, Michel (15 April 1991). "Guerre 40-45: Les prisonniers de guerre". Le Soir.
- Belgium: The Official Account of What Happened, 1939–40. London: Belgian Ministry of Foreign Affairs. 1941. OCLC 4025429.
- Catalogue officiel 1973: Belgique, Congo, Rwanda, Burundi, Europa. Brussels: CSBNTP. 1973.
- "Ceux de XIIIB: Recueil de Textes extraits du Mensuel de L'Amicale des Anciens Prisonniers de Guerre du Stalag XIIIB" (PDF). Centre Liégois d'Histoire et d'Archaeologie Militaire. Archived from the original (PDF) on 9 August 2013.
- Keegan, John (2005). The Second World War. New York: Penguin Books. p. 96. ISBN 978-0-14-303573-2.
- Warmbrunn, Werner (1993). "The Germans and Belgian Prisoners of War". The German Occupation of Belgium 1940-1944. American University Studies 122. New York: Peter Lang. ISBN 978-1-4539-0997-3.
- Yapou, Elizer (1998). "4: Belgium: Disintegration and Resurrection". Governments in Exile, 1939–1945. Jerusalem.
