= Kwiatków, Opole Voivodeship =

Kwiatków
- Village
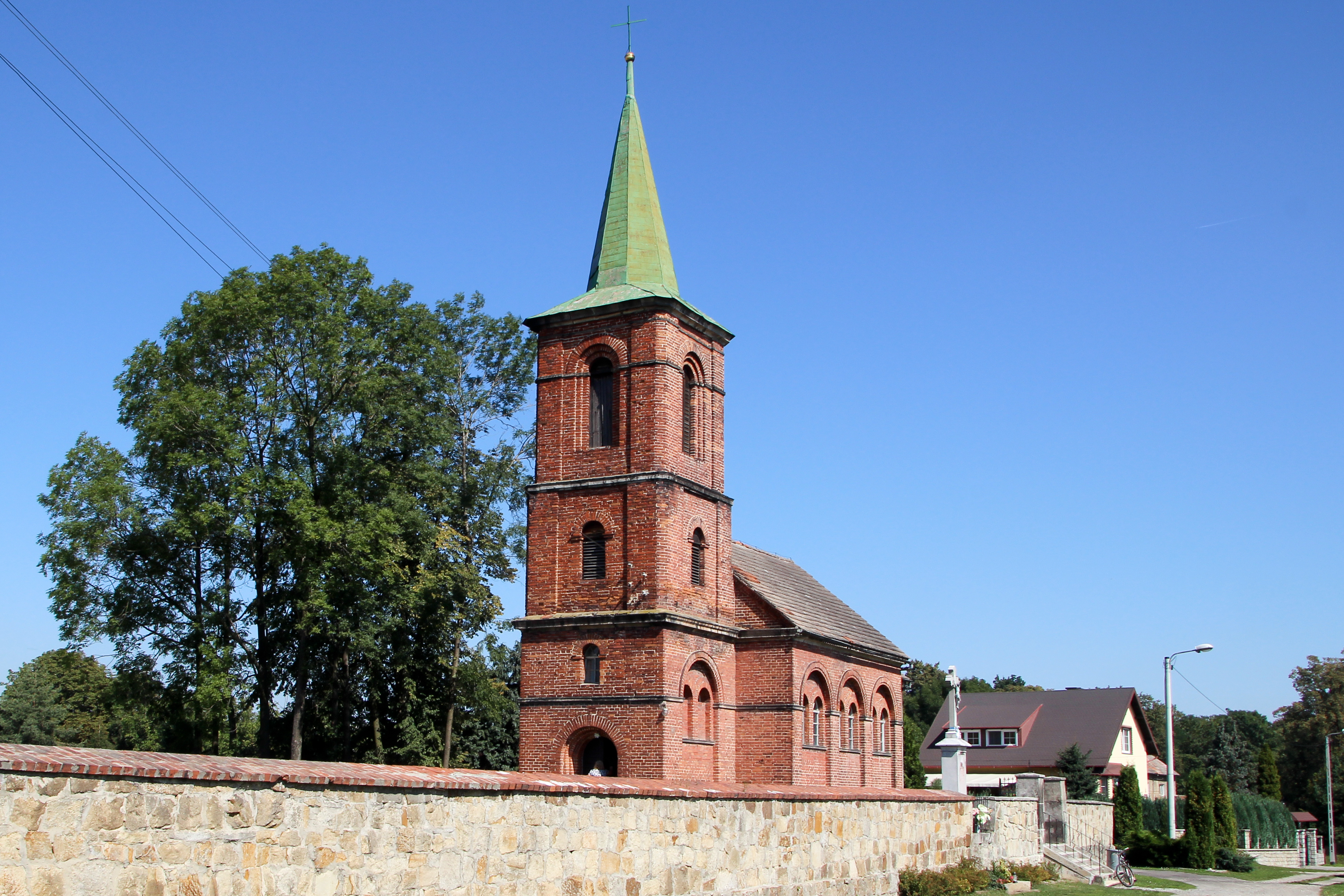

- Location within Poland
- Coordinates: 50°25′36″N 17°15′17″E
- Country: Poland
- Voivodeship: Opole
- County: Nysa
- Gmina: Otmuchów
- Population: 99

Kwiatków [ˈkfjatkuf] (German: Blumenthal) is a village in the administrative district of Gmina Otmuchów, within Nysa County, Opole Voivodeship, in south-western Poland, close to the Czech border.

== People from Kwiatków ==
- Alexander von Falkenhausen (1878-1966), German general
