= Prisoner of War Medal 1940–1945 =

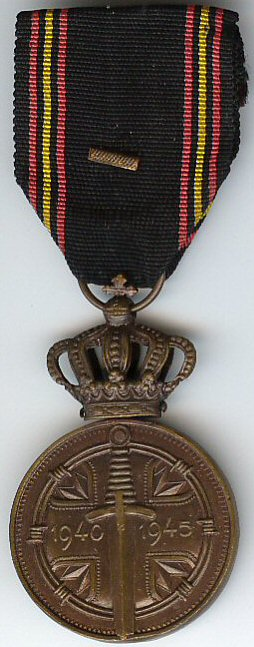
- Prisoner of War Medal 1940–1945 (obverse)
- Type: War medal
- Awarded for: Imprisonment by Axis Forces during World War II
- Presented by: Kingdom of Belgium
- Eligibility: Belgian soldiers
- Status: No longer awarded
- Established: 20 October 1947
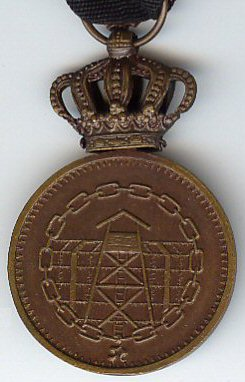
- Medal reverse

The Prisoner of War Medal 1940–1945 (French: Médaille du Prisonnier de Guerre 1940–1945, Dutch: Krijgsgevangenenmedaille 1940–1945) was a Belgian war service medal established by royal decree on 20 October 1947 and awarded to all members of the Belgian Armed Forces imprisoned by Axis Forces during the Second World War.

== Award description ==
The Prisoner of War Medal 1940–1945 was a 38 mm in diameter circular bronze medal surmounted by a three-dimensional 25 mm high royal crown mounted on a pin giving the entire assembly (medal and crown) a height of 64 mm. The obverse bore a broadsword pointing down superimposed over a Greek cross with slightly flared ends and bisecting the years "1940" and "1945" inscribed in relief on the lateral cross arms. Two triangular laurel leaves protrude from between the cross arms fanning out. A ring of barbed wire encircles the cross along the entire circumference 3mm from the medal's edge. The reverse bore a guard tower and prison camp fence surrounded by a chain along the entire circumference 3mm from the medal's edge.

The medal was suspended by a ring through the crown's orb from a 37 mm wide black silk moiré ribbon with narrow longitudinal 1 mm red/black/yellow/black/red stripes 2 mm from the edges. Years of imprisonment were denoted on the ribbon by small striated metal bars.

== Notable recipients (partial list) ==
The individuals listed below were awarded the Prisoner of War Medal:

- Lieutenant General Albert Baron Crahay
- Cavalry Lieutenant General Marcel Jooris
- Lieutenant General Sir Louis Teysen
- Lieutenant General Constant Weyns
- Major General Maurice Jacmart
- Cavalry Lieutenant General Sir Maximilien de Neve de Roden
- Lieutenant General Alphonse Verstraete
- Lieutenant General Baron Raoul de Hennin de Boussu-Walcourt
- Lieutenant General Joseph Leroy
- Lieutenant General Fernand Vanderhaeghen
- Lieutenant General Robert Oor
- Lieutenant General Libert Elie Thomas
- Lieutenant General Léon Bievez
- Major General Jean Buysse
- Major General Paul Jacques
- Aviator Major General Norbert Leboutte
- Chaplain General Louis Kerremans
- Count Pierre Harmel
- Guy Cudell
- Count Gatien du Parc Locmaria
- Baron Gilbert Thibaut de Maisières
- Count Charles of Limburg Stirum

== See also ==
- Orders, decorations, and medals of Belgium

== Other sources ==
- Quinot H., 1950, Recueil illustré des décorations belges et congolaises, 4e Edition. (Hasselt)
- Cornet R., 1982, Recueil des dispositions légales et réglementaires régissant les ordres nationaux belges. 2e Ed. N.pl., (Brussels)
- Borné A.C., 1985, Distinctions honorifiques de la Belgique, 1830–1985 (Brussels)
