= Nadine Hwang =

Chinese lawyer and pilot (1902–1972)

- 黃訥亭
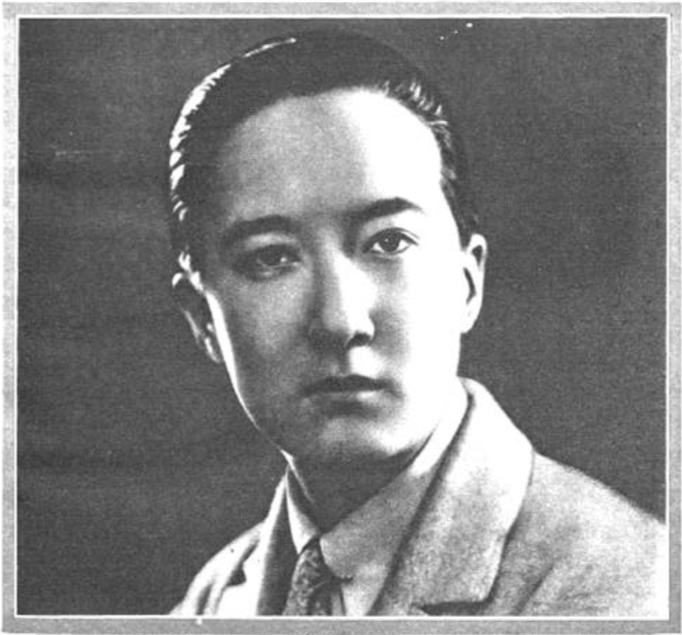
- Huang in 1929
- Born: March 3, 1902; Madrid, Spain
- Died: February 1972 (aged 69); Brussels, Belgium
- Occupations: Army officer, pilot
- Partner: Nelly Mousset-Vos

Nadine Hwang, or Nadine Huong (Chinese 黃訥亭); (March 3, 1902 – 1972) was one of the first Chinese female pilots and served in the Chinese Air Force as an honorary colonel. She was at one point in a relationship with Natalie Clifford Barney and survived deportation to the Ravensbrück concentration camp.

== Early life ==
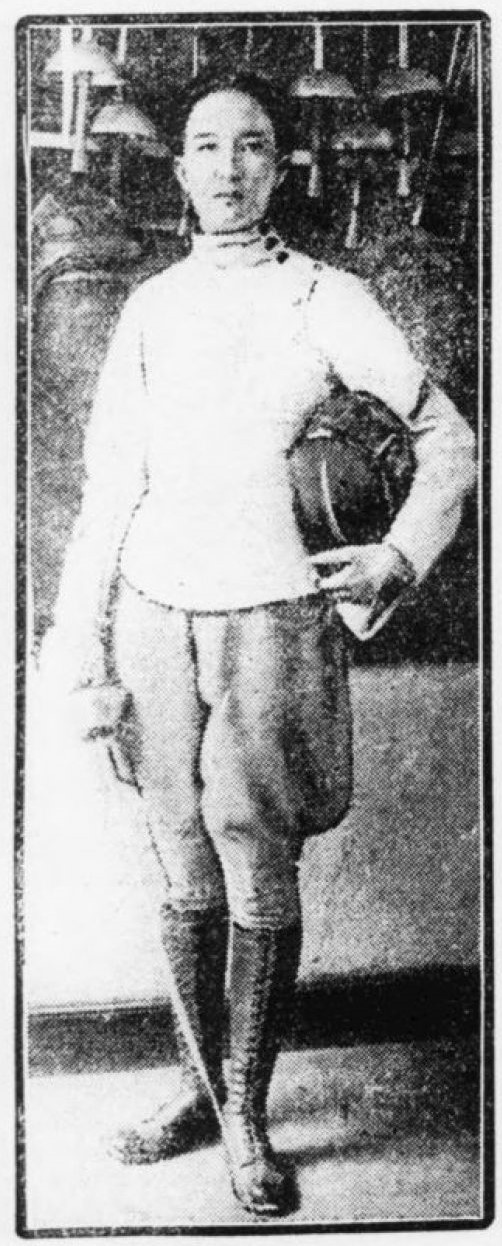
Nadine Hwang in fencing outfit 1928

Nadine Hwang was born in Madrid, to a Belgian mother, Juliette Brouta-Gilliard, and a Chinese father, Lühe Hwang. Both her parents were Catholics. Hwang was baptised in June 1902 in Madrid, in the parish church of Nuestra Señora del Pilar. Her father, who came from an influential Chinese family, was a diplomat and high official. In 1904 he was briefly transferred to Havana, where in 1905 Hwang's sister Marcela (later known as Marcela de Juan) was born. A few months later, the whole family returned to Madrid, where Hwang's father had been appointed head of the Chinese delegation.

At school in Madrid, Nadine Hwang spoke Castilian fluently as well as her native French. She practiced Mandarin Chinese with the other families in the delegation and took English lessons.

== Early life ==
After the collapse of Manchu rule and the establishment of the Republic of China, Hwang's father was transferred to Beijing in 1913 to the European Affairs Department of the Ministry of Foreign Affairs. Nadine Hwang continued her education in an international school run by French nuns. She then studied law at the American Hamilton College via distance learning.

As a young girl, due to her family's high social status, Hwang met several well-known figures of her time such as Mao Zedong, Lin Yutang, and Hu Shih, who were invited to the family's home as guests.

Even as a child, Nadine Hwang tried to escape the bounds of convention and gender roles. She learned to drive a car and fly small planes at an early age. She liked to wear men's clothes, whether for sports or for a party, where, for example, she would appear in traditional Aragonese costume to dance the Aragonese jota with a female rider. Japanese-American artist Isamu Noguchi recalled meeting her in 1930. describing her as "piratical." She learned sports such as polo, cricket, and equestrianism, unusual for Chinese women of her time.

== Career in China ==
Zhang Zongchang was the first warlord to accept women into his army. When he met Nadine Hwang, he decided to make her a colonel in the Air Force and insisted that she wear short hair and a uniform. Although her rank as colonel was only an honorary rank, Hwang was given a position of trust as a staff liaison officer. It was during this time that she earned her nickname, the "Amazon of the North."

Hwang was stationed as a lieutenant in the Chinese army under Zhang Xueliang starting in 1929. She later obtained an important economic position in the Beiyang government and worked as a confidential secretary to premier Pan Fu. She had previously worked for him as a press secretary since 1927.

In 1933, Hwang moved to Paris, where she was part of the bohemian scene. Traveling to the US and throughout Europe, she lectured about China and advocated for greater economic exchange.

== Life in Paris ==
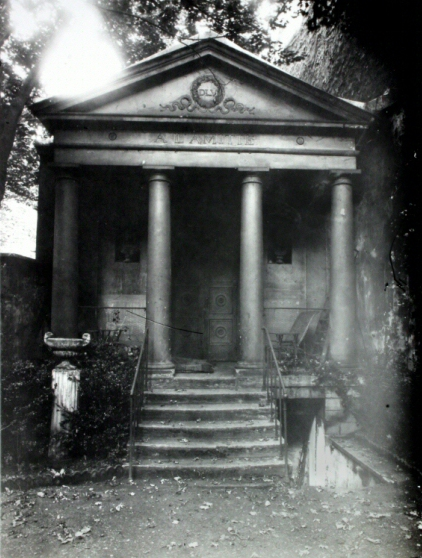
Atget – Temple of Friendship at 20 Rue Jacob, where Natalie Barney's salon was held.

When Hwang moved to Paris, she occasionally took on the role of chauffeur for Natalie Clifford Barney; they became lovers and Hwang was a participant of Barney's literary salons. In one account of this period of Parisian history, she is described as a "piratical" Asian beauty, while in another account she is described as a crossdresser.

There is evidence to suggest that Hwang spied against the Nazis on behalf of the French Resistance. Hwang was a target of racism due to her Chinese identity and jealousy from Barney's other lovers and admirers.

== Ravensbrück concentration camp ==
Hwang was deported to the Ravensbrück concentration camp in 1944. On May 13, 1944, the transport left the Gare de l'Est in Paris. Four days later, the 567 women arrived at Fürstenberg train station. In the Ravensbrück concentration camp, Nadine Hwang was given prisoner number 39239 and had to wear the red triangle, which marked her as a political prisoner.

She had to do forced labor for Siemens and became friends with Rachel Krausz and her nine-year-old daughter Irene Krausz. To remember Nadine Hwang, Irene Krausz gave her daughter the first name Nadine.

=== Nelly Mousset-Vos ===
On Christmas Eve 1944, Nelly Mousset-Vos was asked to sing Christmas carols in the barracks of French prisoners. Hwang asked her to sing a song from Madame Butterfly, and they quickly got close and became a couple.

They were separated in March 1945, when Nelly Mousset-Vos was deported to the Mauthausen concentration camp. In April 1945, shortly before the liberation of the camp, Hwang and the Krauszes, along with thousands of other prisoners, were evacuated to Sweden on Red Cross White Buses. Their arrival in Malmö on April 28 was documented by Swedish news photographers.

== Later life and death ==
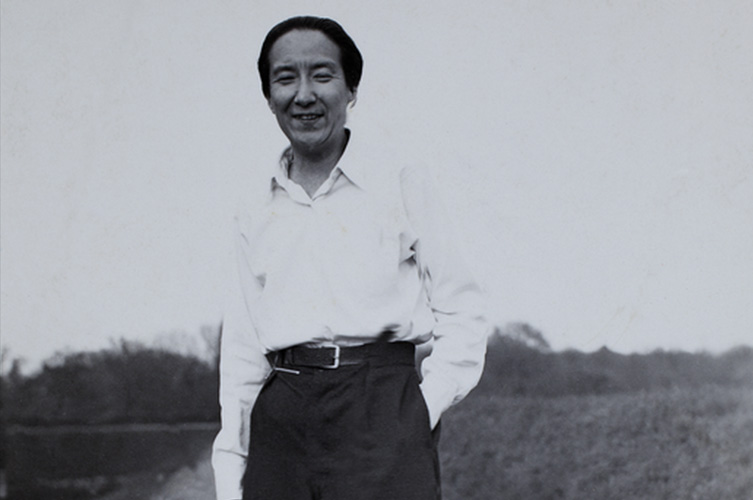
Nadine Hwang 1945

In 1945, Nadine Hwang moved to Brussels and began living with Nelly Mousset-Vos. They left Europe in 1950 to start a new life in Venezuela, along with Mousset-Vos' daughter. They posed as cousins and lived together in Caracas for two decades. Mousset-Vos worked at the French embassy and Hwang worked in a bank.

Due to an illness, Hwang was forced to take strong medication and she suffered a stroke before the treatment was completed. Due to Hwang's deteriorating health, the couple returned to Europe in the late 1960s.

Nadine Hwang died in February 1972, Nelly Mousset-Vos in 1985, and they are buried in different graves in Brussels.

== Literature ==
- Alfonso Ojedas: Cinco historias de la conexión española con la India, Birmania y China: Desde la imprenta a la igualdad de género. Los Libros de La Catarata 2020, ISBN 978-8-41352-044-5.

== Films ==
Magnus Gertten realized a trilogy of documentaries between 2011 and 2022; Nadine Hwang's life is discussed in the first two and is the main subject of the third.

- Harbour of Hope (Originally: Hoppets hamn, 2011)
- Every Face Has a Name (2015)
- Nelly & Nadine (2022)
