= Alexander von Falkenhausen =

German general and advisor (1878–1966)

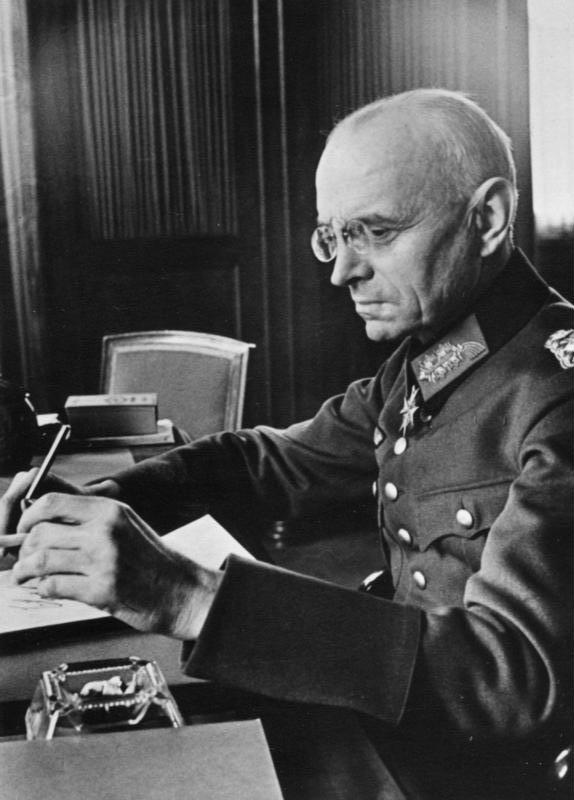
- Falkenhausen in 1940
- Born: Alexander Ernst Alfred Hermann Freiherr von Falkenhausen; 29 October 1878; Gut Blumenthal, Province of Silesia, German Empire
- Died: 31 July 1966 (aged 87); Nassau, West Germany
- Military career
- Allegiance: German Empire; Weimar Republic; Republic of China; Nazi Germany
- Branch: Imperial German Army; Reichswehr; Republic of China Army; German Army
- Service years: 1897–1930; 1934–1944
- Rank: General der Infanterie
- Conflicts: Boxer Rebellion; World War I Second Sino-Japanese War; World War II
- Awards: Pour le Mérite; Order of the Sacred Tripod

Alexander Ernst Alfred Hermann Freiherr von Falkenhausen (29 October 1878 – 31 July 1966) was a German general and military advisor to Chiang Kai-shek. He was an important figure during the Sino-German cooperation to reform the Chinese army. In 1938, Germany ended its support for China under pressure from Japan, and Falkenhausen was forced to return home. Back in Europe, he later became the head of the military government of Belgium from 1940 to 1944 during its German occupation.

== Early life and military career ==
Alexander von Falkenhausen was born at Blumenthal, near Neisse (now Nysa, Poland) in the Prussian province of Silesia, one of seven children of Baron Alexander von Falkenhausen (1844–1909) and his wife, Elisabeth. He attended a Gymnasium in Breslau (now Wrocław, Poland) and then the cadet school at Wahlstatt (now Legnickie Pole). In his youth, Falkenhausen showed an interest in Eastern Asia and its societies. He travelled and studied in Japan, northern China, Korea and Indochina from 1909 to 1911.

In 1897, he was commissioned as a second lieutenant into the 91st Oldenburg Infantry Regiment of the Imperial German Army, taking part in quelling the Boxer Rebellion, and served as a military attaché in Japan from 1900 up until the First World War. He was awarded the prestigious Pour le Mérite award while serving with the Ottoman Army in Palestine. After the war, he remained in the Reichswehr (German Army) and in 1927 was appointed to head the Dresden Infantry School.

== Adviser to Chiang Kai-shek ==
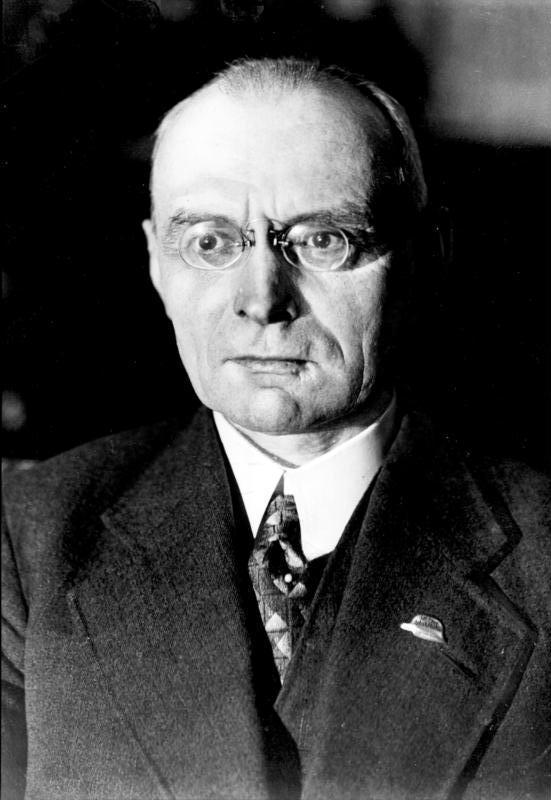
Falkenhausen in 1933

In 1930, Falkenhausen retired from the service. In 1934, he went to China to join the German military advisors to the Chinese army. He became a military advisor to Chiang Kai-shek, the leader of the Republic of China. Von Falkenhausen was responsible for most of the military training of the army. Both had studied abroad in Japan, and their conversations were conducted directly in Japanese. They said that their friendship deepened because they did not use an interpreter. The original plans by von Seeckt called for a drastic reduction of the Chinese army to 60 elite divisions modelled on the Wehrmacht. This would require disbanding some of the forces of regional leaders, and the question of which factions' troops would be axed remained a problem.

On 30 June 1934, Alexander's brother Hans Joachim von Falkenhausen, SA-Oberführer and Chief of Staff to SA-Gruppenführer Georg von Detten, was killed by the SS in the Night of the Long Knives.

The Germans trained 80,000 Chinese troops, in eight divisions, which formed the elite of Chiang's army. However, China was not ready to face Japan on equal terms. Chiang's decision to commit all of his new divisions in the Battle of Shanghai, despite objections from his own staff officers and von Falkenhausen, would cost him one-third of his best troops. Chiang switched his strategy to preserve strength for the eventual Chinese Civil War.

Von Falkenhausen recommended that Chiang fight a war of attrition as Falkenhausen calculated that Japan could not win a long-term war. He suggested that Chiang should hold the Yellow River line and not attack until later in the war. Also, Chiang should give up a number of provinces in northern China, including Shandong. He also recommended the construction of fortifications at strategically important locations to slow the Japanese advance. Falkenhausen also advised the Chinese to establish a number of guerrilla operations behind Japanese lines.

In 1937, Nazi Germany allied with the Empire of Japan, which was fighting the Second Sino-Japanese War with China. As a goodwill gesture to Japan, Germany recognised the Japanese puppet state of Manchukuo, withdrew German support from China and forced Falkenhausen to resign by threatening to have his family in Germany punished for disloyalty. After a goodbye dinner party with Chiang Kai-shek's family, Falkenhausen promised that he would never reveal any of the battle plans he had devised to the Japanese.

According to some sources (especially from Communist Chinese ones in the late 1930s), Falkenhausen kept in contact with Chiang Kai-shek and occasionally sent European luxury items and food to him, the Chiang household, and his officers. On his 72nd birthday in 1950, Falkenhausen received a $12,000 cheque from Chiang Kai-shek as a birthday gift and a personal note declaring him a "Friend of China".

On Falkenhausen's 80th birthday in 1958, Wang Xiaoxi, the Nationalist Chinese ambassador to Belgium, awarded him the Grand Cordon of the Order of the Sacred Tripod for his contributions in defending China.

== Military governor for Belgium ==
Following his return to Germany, Falkenhausen served as deputy commander of the Dresden military district. Recalled to active duty in 1938, Falkenhausen served as an infantry general on the Western Front, until he was appointed military governor of Belgium in May 1940, the same post his uncle Ludwig von Falkenhausen held 23 years prior during the First World War. He established his headquarters at Place Royale. Throughout his period of administration, Falkenhausen had co-operated with both Eggert Reeder and Dr. Werner Best, to try to apply the rules of the Hague Convention in their region, often against the wishes and instructions of their Wehrmacht and SS superiors. He warned the Berlin authorities against adopting an overly harsh approach toward the Belgians, who possessed a “strong sense of personal freedom.”

Though opposed to Nazi extremism towards the Jewish population, he yielded to pressure from Reinhard Heydrich's RSHA, leading in June 1942 to the deportation of 28,900 Jews. His deputy for economic affairs, Eggert Reeder, was in charge of the destruction of "Jewish influence" in the Belgian economy, leading to mass unemployment of Jewish workers, especially in the diamond business. While the implementation of economic policy led to mass unemployment of Belgian Jewish workers, Reeder's efforts preserved existing national administrative structures and business relations within Belgium and northern France during the German occupation. 2,250 of these unemployed Belgian Jews were sent to forced labour camps in Northern France, in order to build the Atlantic Wall for Organisation Todt.

To ensure that all the Belgian people co-operated in the German occupation, Reeder negotiated an agreement to allow native Belgian Jews to remain in Belgium. Part of this was the non-enforcement of the Reich Security Main Office order for all Jews to be marked by wearing a yellow Star of David at all times, until Helmut Knochen's conference in Paris on 14 March 1942.

He intervened twice to prevent the execution of Belgians for resistance against the Germans, at the request of Qian Xiuling, a Chinese-Belgian woman whose elder cousin, Lieutenant General Qian Zhuolun, was a good friend of Falkenhausen during his time in China and in the post-war trial, Qian Xiuling spoke in his defence, saying: "Nothing I did could have been accomplished without General von Falkenhausen's help. Even though he might not deserve an award, neither should he be put on trial, definitely not."

== Bomb plot ==
Falkenhausen was a close friend of the anti-Hitler conspirators, Carl Friedrich Goerdeler and Field Marshal Erwin von Witzleben and soon came to detest Adolf Hitler and the Nazi regime. He offered his support to Witzleben for a planned coup d'état against Hitler, but did not take any part in the coup. After the failure of the 20 July Plot to kill Hitler in 1944, Falkenhausen was relieved of his command and later arrested. Falkenhausen spent the rest of the war being transferred from one concentration camp to another. In late April 1945, he was transferred to Tyrol with about 140 other prominent inmates of the Dachau concentration camp.

The SS fled, leaving the prisoners behind and he was captured by the Fifth U.S. Army on 5 May 1945.

== Trial and pardon ==
Falkenhausen and Reeder were sent to Belgium for trial in 1948, where they were held on remand for three years. A trial for their role in the deportation of Jews from Belgium, but not for their deaths in Auschwitz, began in Brussels on 9 March 1951 and they were defended by the lawyer Ernst Achenbach.

During the trial, Falkenhausen was vouched for by Qian Xiuling, former French Prime Minister Léon Blum and a number of Belgian Jews, who gave evidence that Falkenhausen and Reeder had tried to save Belgian and Jewish lives. Nevertheless, on 9 July 1951, they were convicted and sentenced to twelve years of hard labour in Germany. On their return to West Germany three weeks after the end of the trial, having served one third of their sentence, as required by Belgian law, they were pardoned by Chancellor Konrad Adenauer. At the German border post where he made his return to Germany from Belgium, Falkenhausen wrote in the guest book "Ingrata Belgia, non possidebis ossa mea [Ungrateful Belgium, you shall not possess my bones]", referencing the Roman general and politician Scipio Africanus.

== Later life ==
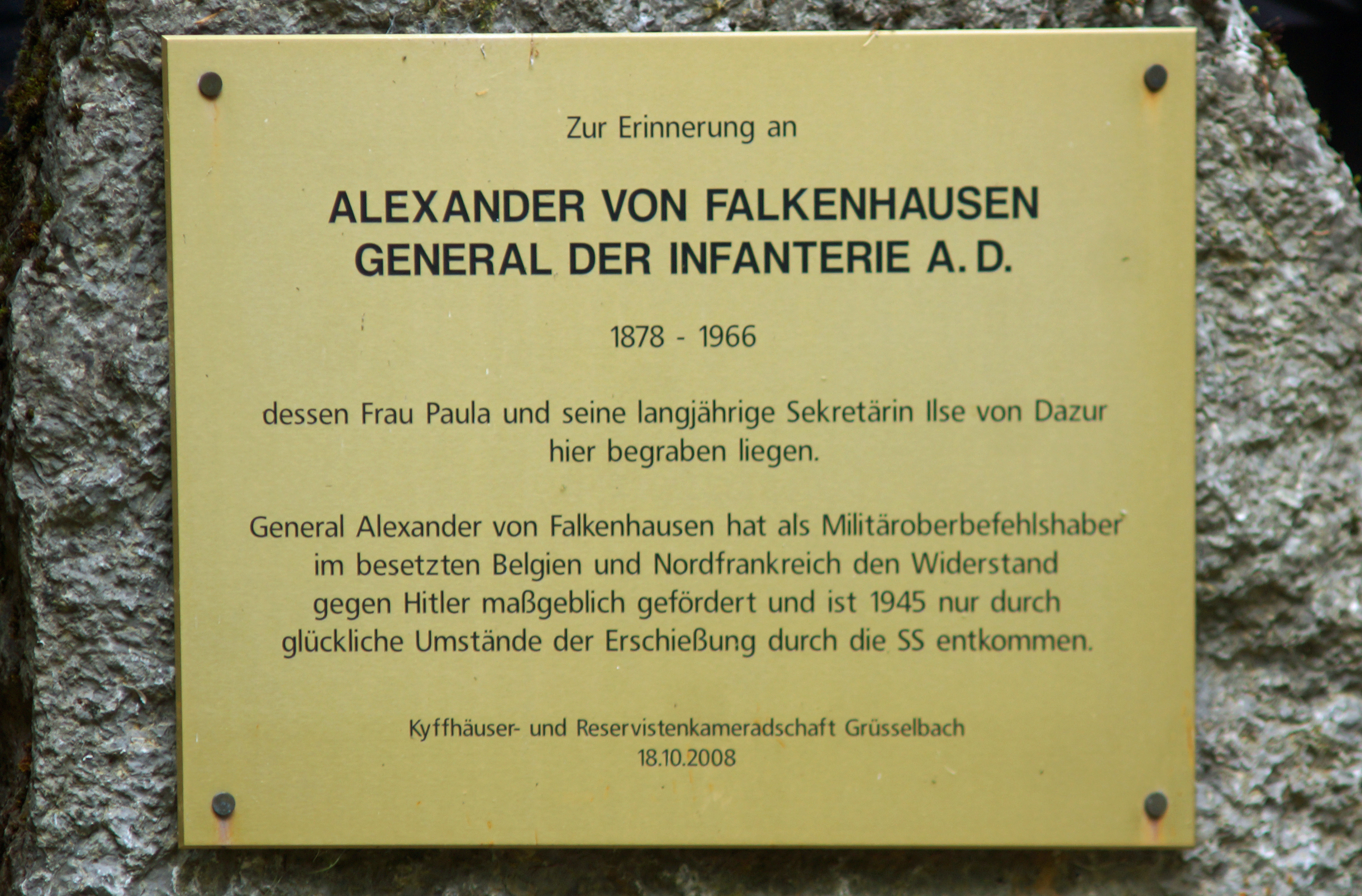
Memorial plate in memory of Alexander von Falkenhausen at the forest cemetery near Grüsselbach

On return to Germany, he first lived near the then inner German border on the estate of his friend Franz von Papen near Grüsselbach and then, fearing kidnapping by East German agents, in Nassau an der Lahn.

In 1950, Falkenhausen became a widower; in 1960, he married his second wife, Cécile Vent (1906–1977), who had been a Belgian resistance fighter. He had met her during his imprisonment in 1948, when Vent was a member of the administrative commission of the prisons of Verviers.

== Dates of rank ==
- Sekondeleutnant, March 1897
- Leutnant, January 1899
- Hauptmann, March 1910
- Major, March 1915
- Lieutenant Colonel, Ottoman Army, June 1916
- Oberstleutnant, Imperial German Army, December 1920
- Oberst, April 1924
- Generalmajor, April 1928
- Generalleutnant, October 1929
- General der Infanterie, September 1940

== Decorations and awards ==
- Pour le Mérite (Prussia), 7 May 1918
- Order of the Crown, 4th class with Swords (Prussia)
- Knight's Cross of the Friedrich Order, 2nd class with Swords (Württemberg)
- Iron Cross of 1914, 1st and 2nd class
- Knight's Cross of the Royal House Order of Hohenzollern with Swords [7]
- Knight of Honour of the Order of Saint John (Bailiwick of Brandenburg)
- Service Award (Prussia)
- Military Merit Order, 3rd class with Swords (Bavaria)
- Knight's Cross of the Order of the Crown with Swords (Württemberg)
- Honorary Knight's Cross, First Class of the House and Merit Order of Peter Frederick Louis with swords and laurel (Oldenburg)
- Friedrich August Cross, 1st and 2nd class (Oldenburg)
- Bravery Medal (Hesse)
- Hanseatic Cross (Hamburg)
- Order of the Iron Crown, 3rd class with War Decoration (Austria)
- Military Merit Cross, 3rd class with War Decoration (Austria-Hungary)
- Order of Osmanieh, 3rd class with sabre (Ottoman Empire)
- Order of the Medjidie, 2nd class with swords (Ottoman Empire)
- Imtiyaz Medal in Silver with Sabres (Ottoman Empire)
- Liakat Medal in Gold with sabre (Ottoman Empire)
- Gallipoli Star ("Iron Crescent", Ottoman Empire)
- Wehrmacht Long Service Award
- War Merit Cross, 1st and 2nd class with Swords (1939)
- German Cross in Silver (20 April 1943)
- Order of the Sacred Tripod, Special Grand Cordon (China) on 28 November 1958
