= Qian Xiuling =

Chinese-Belgian scientist (1912–2008)

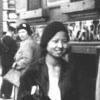
- Qian Xiuling in 1933
- Born: March 13, 1913; Yixing, Jiangsu, China
- Died: August 1, 2008 (aged 95); Brussels, Belgium
- Other names: Siou-Ling Tsien de Perlinghi
- Education: Catholic University of Leuven
- Known for: Saving lives during World War II in Belgium
- Spouse: Grégoire de Perlinghi

Qian Xiuling
- Traditional Chinese: 錢秀玲
- Simplified Chinese: 钱秀玲
Transcriptions
Standard Mandarin
- Hanyu Pinyin: Qián Xiùlíng
- Wade–Giles: Tsien Siou-Ling
- IPA: [tɕʰjɛn˧˥ ɕju˥˩liŋ˧˥]

Qian Xiuling (13 March 1913 – 1 August 2008), or Siou-Ling Tsien de Perlinghi, was a Chinese-Belgian scientist who won a medal for saving nearly 100 lives during World War II in Belgium. She had a street named after her and a 16-episode TV drama was made of her life for Chinese television. She has been called the "Belgian Schindler".

== Life ==
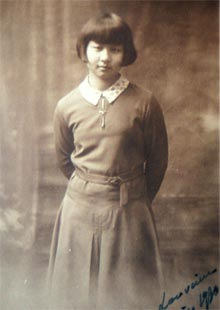
Qian Xiuling in 1930

Qian was born on 13 March 1913 in Yixing in Jiangsu Province in 1912 to a large and well connected family.

In 1929, she left for Europe to study physics and chemistry in Belgium at the Catholic University of Leuven, along with her brother Zhuoru.

In 1933, she married Grégoire de Perlinghi, a Belgian doctor, after breaking her engagement to her Chinese fiancé, and they went to live in Herbeumont.

In 1939, one source suggests that she travelled to Paris in hopes of studying in Marie Curie's laboratory but the whole facility had been moved to the United States because of the war.

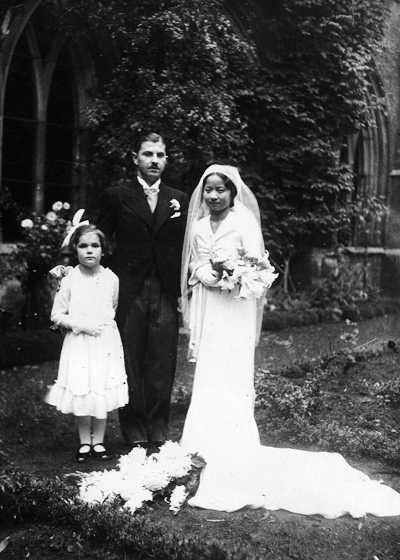
Qian marrying Grégoire de Perlinghi in 1933

In June 1940, her town of Herbeumont was occupied by the German army when a Belgian youth blew up a military train by burying a mine under the railway. The youth was sentenced to death, but Qian realised that she knew the German general who was in charge of Belgium. She had known General Alexander von Falkenhausen when he was working in China as part of the Sino-German cooperation. Falkenhausen had been an advisor to Chiang Kai-shek and he worked closely with Qian's elder cousin, Lieutenant General Qian Zhuolun. She wrote a letter and travelled to see Falkenhausen, who decided to use his authority to spare the boy for reasons of humanity.

On 7 June 1944, Qian was contacted again when the Germans had taken 97 Belgians prisoner under sentence of death in revenge for three Gestapo officers who had been killed in the nearby town of Écaussinnes. Despite being pregnant with her first child she again travelled to see Falkenhausen and asked him to intervene. He hesitated but eventually agreed to release the people, although he knew that he was disobeying an order. The general was summoned to Berlin to explain his insubordination. Falkenhausen was spared German trial and punishment by the war's end, but was arrested for war crimes. He was tried in Belgium in 1951.

Qian appeared at the German general's trial and pleaded for Falkenhausen's good character. He was sentenced for twelve years for executing hostages and deporting Jews, and deported to Germany to serve his sentence. After three weeks, when the minimum sentence according Belgium law had passed, he was pardoned by German chancellor Konrad Adenauer and retired. He died in 1966.

Qian left her position at the university in the early 1950s, disappointed by not being promoted.

== Legacy ==
External videos
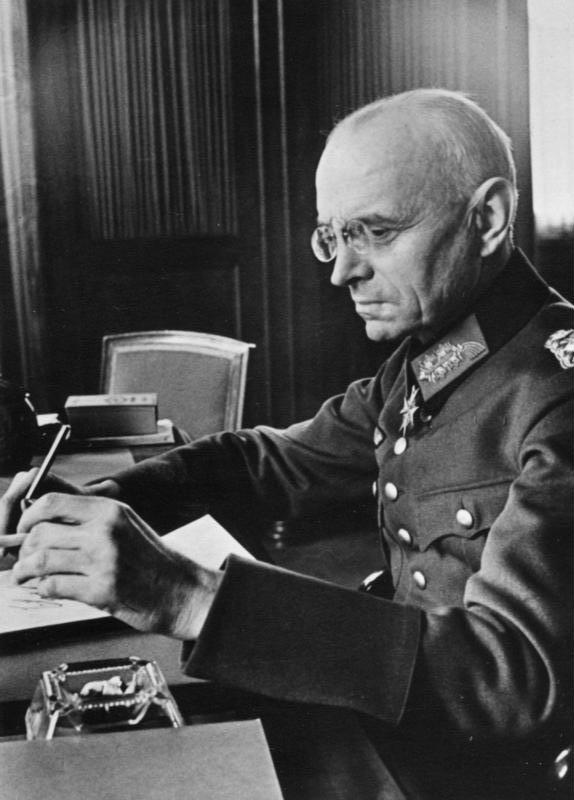
- “Qian Xiuling: China’s female Schindler in Belgium during WWII”, CCTV.com

Qian was awarded the Medal of Belgian Gratitude 1940–1945 by the Belgian government.

Qian's story was made into a sixteen-episode Chinese TV drama, Chinese Woman Facing Gestapo's Gun, starring Xu Qing. She was given a medal by the Belgians after the war but she never told her family in China of her story.

In 2003, Qian's granddaughter, Tatiana de Perlinghi, made a documentary film entitled Ma grand-mère, une héroïne? ("My grandma, a heroine?").

In 2005, she was thanked by Zhang Qiyue, the Chinese Ambassador to Belgium, who visited the rest home where she lived. Qian's husband had died in 1966. There is a street named Rue Perlinghi in her honour in the city of Écaussinnes. A novel by Zhang Yawen was published in 2003 with the English title of Chinese Woman at Gestapo Gunpoint. Another biography by Feng Wu was translated and published in English in 2023. The book was titled "Forget Me: Madame Qian Xiuling-The Belgian Schindler".
