= Écaussinnes =

Municipality in Hainaut Province, Wallonia, Belgium

Écaussinnes Les Scåssenes (Walloon)
- Municipality
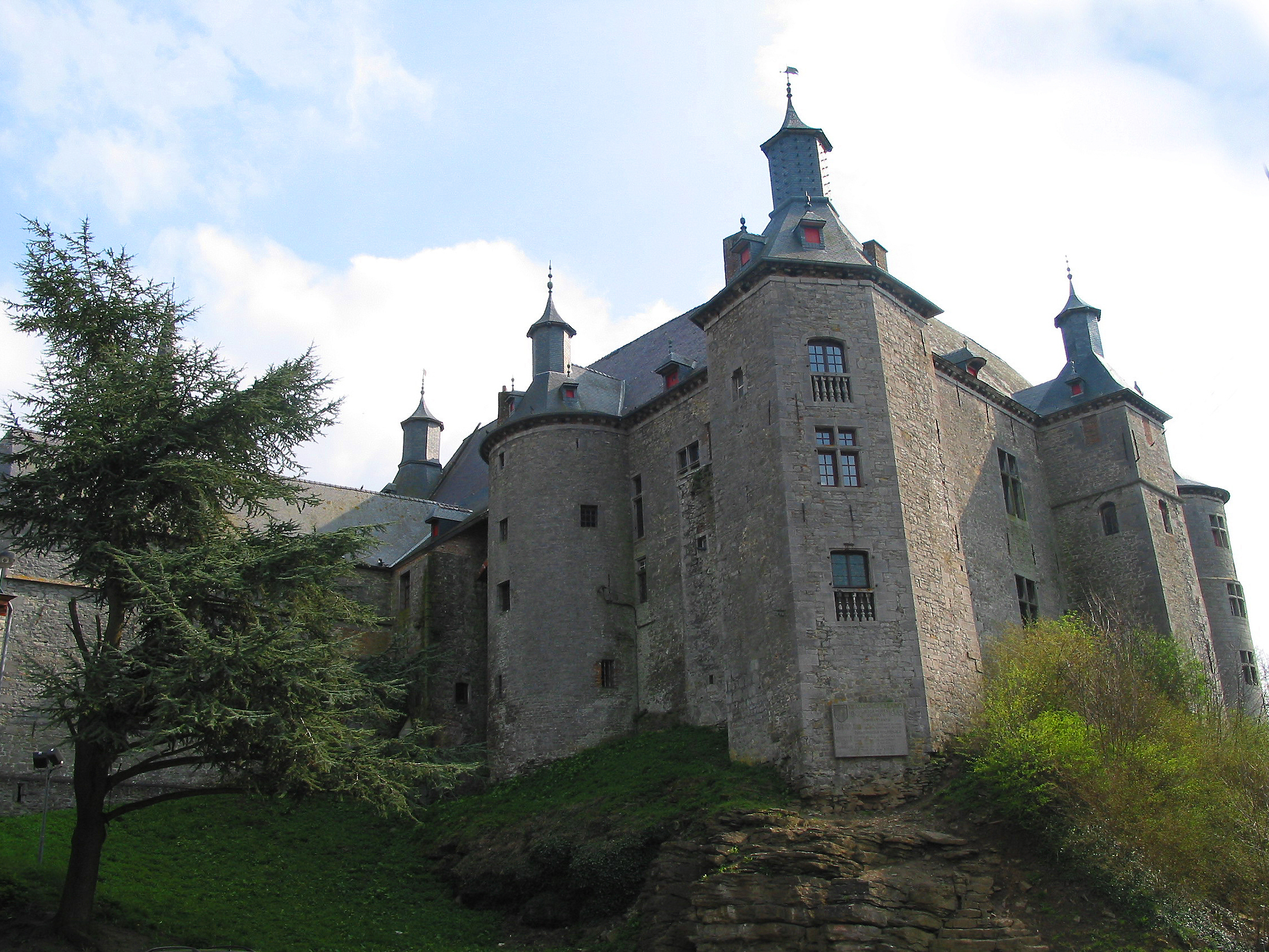
- Écaussinnes-Lalaing Castle

- Flag Coat of arms

- Location of Écaussinnes in Hainaut
- Interactive map of Écaussinnes
- Location in Belgium
- Coordinates: 50°34′N 04°11′E
- Country: Belgium
- Community: French Community
- Region: Wallonia
- Province: Hainaut
- Arrondissement: Soignies

Government
  - Mayor: Xavier Dupont (PS)
  - Governing parties: Vivre Écausinnes (VÉ), MR-CHE, ECOLO

Area
  - Total: 34.86 km^{2} (13.46 sq mi)

Population (2018-01-01)
  - Total: 11,135
  - Density: 319.4/km^{2} (827.3/sq mi)
- Postal codes: 7190, 7191
- NIS code: 55050
- Area codes: 067
- Website: www.ecaussinnes.be

Écaussinnes (French pronunciation: [ekosin]; Picard: Les Scassenes; Walloon: Les Scåssenes) is a municipality of Wallonia located in the province of Hainaut, Belgium.

On 1 January 2018 Écaussinnes had a total population of 11,135. The total area is 34.77 km^{2} which gives a population density of 320 inhabitants per km^{2}.

The municipality consists of the following districts: Écaussinnes-d'Enghien, Écaussinnes-Lalaing, and Marche-lez-Écaussinnes.

The city hosts the "Oberbayern" Festival each year in August, and hosted the Spring Blues Festival from 1988 to 2013.

== History ==
To be expanded

Nearly 100 local citizens were saved from being killed by the German army by the intercession of Qian Xiuling. There is a street named Rue Perlinghi in her honour. "Perlinghi" was her married name.

=== Postal history ===
The ECAUSSINNES post-office opened on 1 December 1850. It used a postal code 158 with bars (before 1864), and 105 with points before 1874. The ECAUSSINNES-D'ENGHIEN post-office opened on 13 November 1879, MARCHE-LEZ-ECAUSSINNES on 10 May 1880.

Postal codes in 1969: - 7180 Marche-lez-Écaussinnes - 7190 Écaussinnes-d'Enghien - 7191 Écaussinnes-Lalaing

Postal codes since at least 1990: 7190, 7191 Écaussinnes-Lalaing
