= Georges Scapini =

French lawyer and politician (1893–1976)

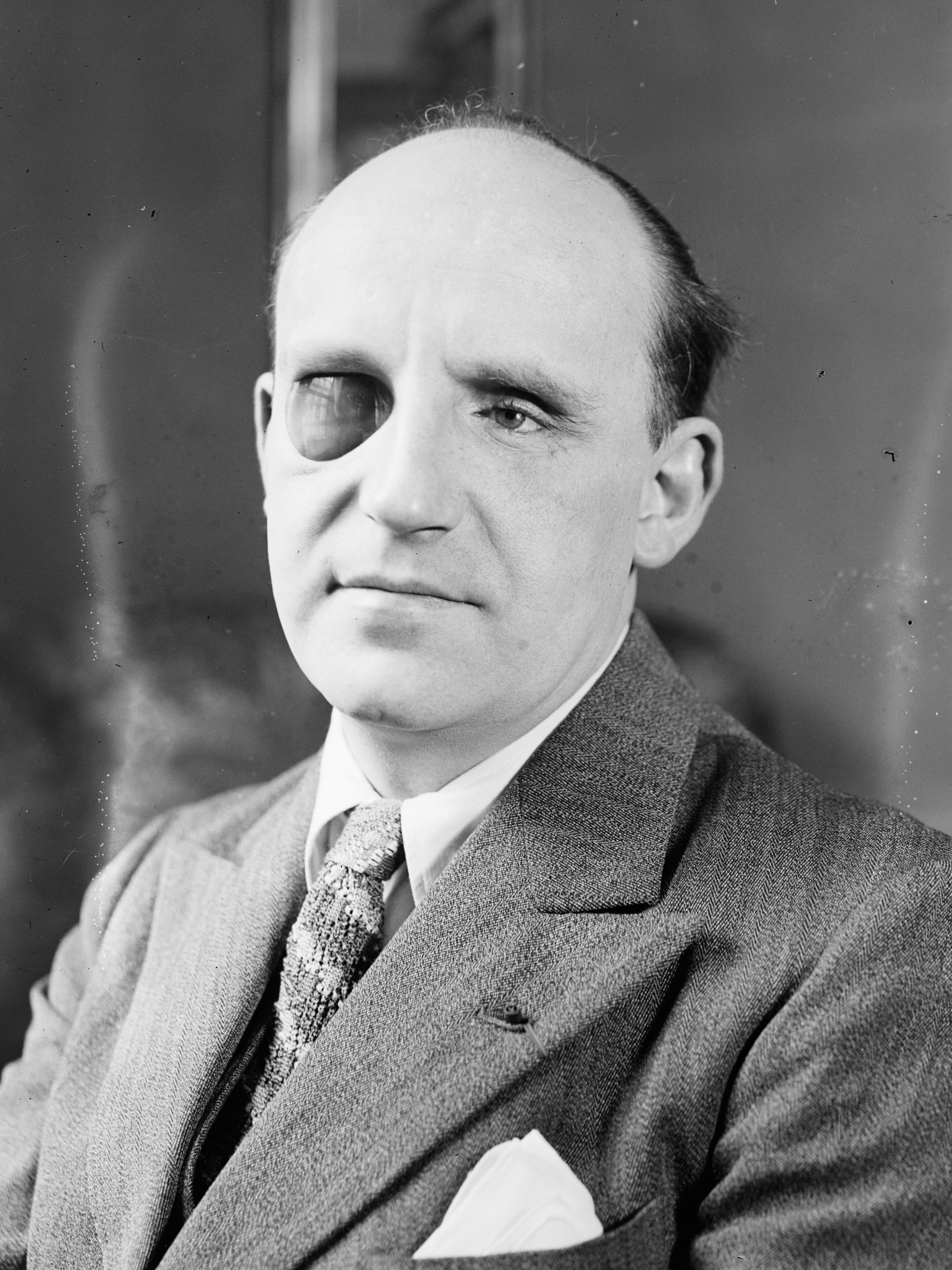
- Portrait of Scapini
- Born: 4 October 1893; Paris, France
- Died: 25 March 1976 (aged 82); Cannes, France
- Occupations: Lawyer, politician

Georges Scapini (French pronunciation: [ʒɔʁʒ skapini]; 4 October 1893 – 28 March 1976) was a French lawyer and politician. He served as a member of the Chamber of Deputies from 1928 to 1942. He served in the government of Marshal Pétain and was tried as a Nazi collaborator in 1952.
