= Veurne-Diksmuide-Ostend (Chamber of Representatives constituency) =

Belgian political subdivision

Veurne-Diksmuide-Ostend was a constituency used to elect a single member of the Belgian Chamber of Representatives between 1900 and 1991.

== Representatives ==
Election	Representative (Party)	Representative (Party)	Representative (Party)	Representative (Party)	Representative (Party)
1900	Formed from a merger of Veurne, Diksmuide and Ostend				
1900	Adolphe Buyl (Liberal)	Auguste Pil (Catholic)	Eugène De Groote (Catholic)	Jules Vanderheyde (Catholic)	4 seats
1904	Adolphe Buyl (Liberal)	Auguste Pil (Catholic)	Eugène De Groote (Catholic)	Jules Vanderheyde (Catholic)	4 seats
1908	Adolphe Buyl (Liberal)	Auguste Pil (Catholic)	Auguste Hamman (Catholic)	Jean Maes (Catholic)	4 seats
1912	Adolphe Buyl (Liberal)	Auguste Pil (Catholic)	Auguste Hamman (Catholic)	Jean Maes (Catholic)	Désiré Serruys (Liberal)
1919	Adolphe Buyl (Liberal)	Edouard Van Vlaenderen (PS)	Auguste Hamman (Catholic)	Henri Baels (Catholic)	Désiré Serruys (Liberal)
1921	Adolphe Buyl (Liberal)	Frans Brusselmans (Catholic)	Georges Goetgebuer (Catholic)	Henri Baels (Catholic)	Ernest Van Glabbeke (Liberal)
1925	Adolphe Buyl (Liberal)	Frans Brusselmans (Catholic)	Georges Goetgebuer (Catholic)	Henri Baels (Catholic)	Daan Boens (PS)
1929	Emile Vroome (Liberal)	Frans Brusselmans (Catholic)	Georges Marquet (Liberal)	Henri Baels (Catholic)	Jeroom Leuridan (Frontpartij)
1932	Julien Peurquaet (PS)	Frans Brusselmans (Catholic)	Georges Marquet (Liberal)	Karel Goetghebeur (Catholic)	Jeroom Leuridan (Frontpartij)
1936	Julien Peurquaet (PS)	Georges Delputte (Catholic)	Adolphe Van Glabbeke (Liberal)	Karel Goetghebeur (Catholic)	Jeroom Leuridan (Frontpartij)
1939	Julien Peurquaet (PS)	Leon Porta (Catholic)	Adolphe Van Glabbeke (Liberal)	Karel Goetghebeur (Catholic)	Joris Vansteenland (VNV)
1946	Roger De Kinder (BSP)	Leon Porta (Catholic)	Adolphe Van Glabbeke (Liberal)	Karel Goetghebeur (Catholic)	Godfried Develter (CVP)
1949	Roger De Kinder (BSP)	Jan Piers (CVP)	Adolphe Van Glabbeke (Liberal)	Karel Goetghebeur (Catholic)	Godfried Develter (CVP)
1950	Roger De Kinder (BSP)	Jan Piers (CVP)	Adolphe Van Glabbeke (Liberal)	Karel Goetghebeur (Catholic)	Godfried Develter (CVP)
1954	Roger De Kinder (BSP)	Hubert De Groote (BSP)	Adolphe Van Glabbeke (Liberal)	Karel Goetghebeur (Catholic)	Godfried Develter (CVP)
1958	Roger De Kinder (BSP)	Hubert De Groote (BSP)	Maurice Quaghebeur (Liberal)	Dries Claeys (CVP)	Jan Piers (CVP)
1961	Frans Goes (BSP)	Hubert De Groote (BSP)	Maurice Vandamme (CVP)	Dries Claeys (CVP)	Jan Piers (CVP)
1965	Etienne Lootens-Stael (VU)	John Lauwereins (BSP)	Maurice Vandamme (CVP)	Dries Claeys (CVP)	Polydore-Gentiel Holvoet (PVV)
1968	Etienne Lootens-Stael (VU)	John Lauwereins (BSP)	Hubert De Groote (BSP)	Dries Claeys (CVP)	Polydore-Gentiel Holvoet (PVV)
1971	Emiel Vansteenkiste (VU)	Alfons Laridon (BSP)	Gerard Markey (CVP)	Dries Claeys (CVP)	Raoul Bonnel (PVV)
1974	Emiel Vansteenkiste (VU)	Alfons Laridon (BSP)	Jaak Vandemeulebroucke (VU)	Dries Claeys (CVP)	Raoul Bonnel (PVV)
1977	Emiel Vansteenkiste (VU)	Alfons Laridon (BSP)	Maria Tyberghien-Vandenbussche (CVP)	Dries Claeys (CVP)	Raoul Bonnel (PVV)
1978	Emiel Vansteenkiste (VU)	Alfons Laridon (BSP)	Maria Tyberghien-Vandenbussche (CVP)	Cyriel Marchand (CVP)	Raoul Bonnel (PVV)
1981	Julien Desseyn (VU)	Alfons Laridon (BSP)	Marcel Heughebaert (PVV)	Cyriel Marchand (CVP)	Raoul Bonnel (PVV)
1985	Julien Desseyn (VU)	Alfons Laridon (BSP)	Ferdinand Ghesquière (CVP)	Cyriel Marchand (CVP)	Marcel Decoster (PVV)
1988	Jan Loones (VU)	Alfons Laridon (BSP)	Marcel Gesquière (PS)	Cyriel Marchand (CVP)	Marcel Decoster (PVV)
1991	Didier Ramoudt (PVV)	Johan Vande Lanotte (PS)	Ferdinand Ghesquière (CVP)	Gilbert Vanleenhove (CVP)	Julien Demeulenaere (PVV)
1995	Merged into Veurne-Diksmuide-Ostend-Ypres				
