= Eggert Reeder =

German general (1894–1959)

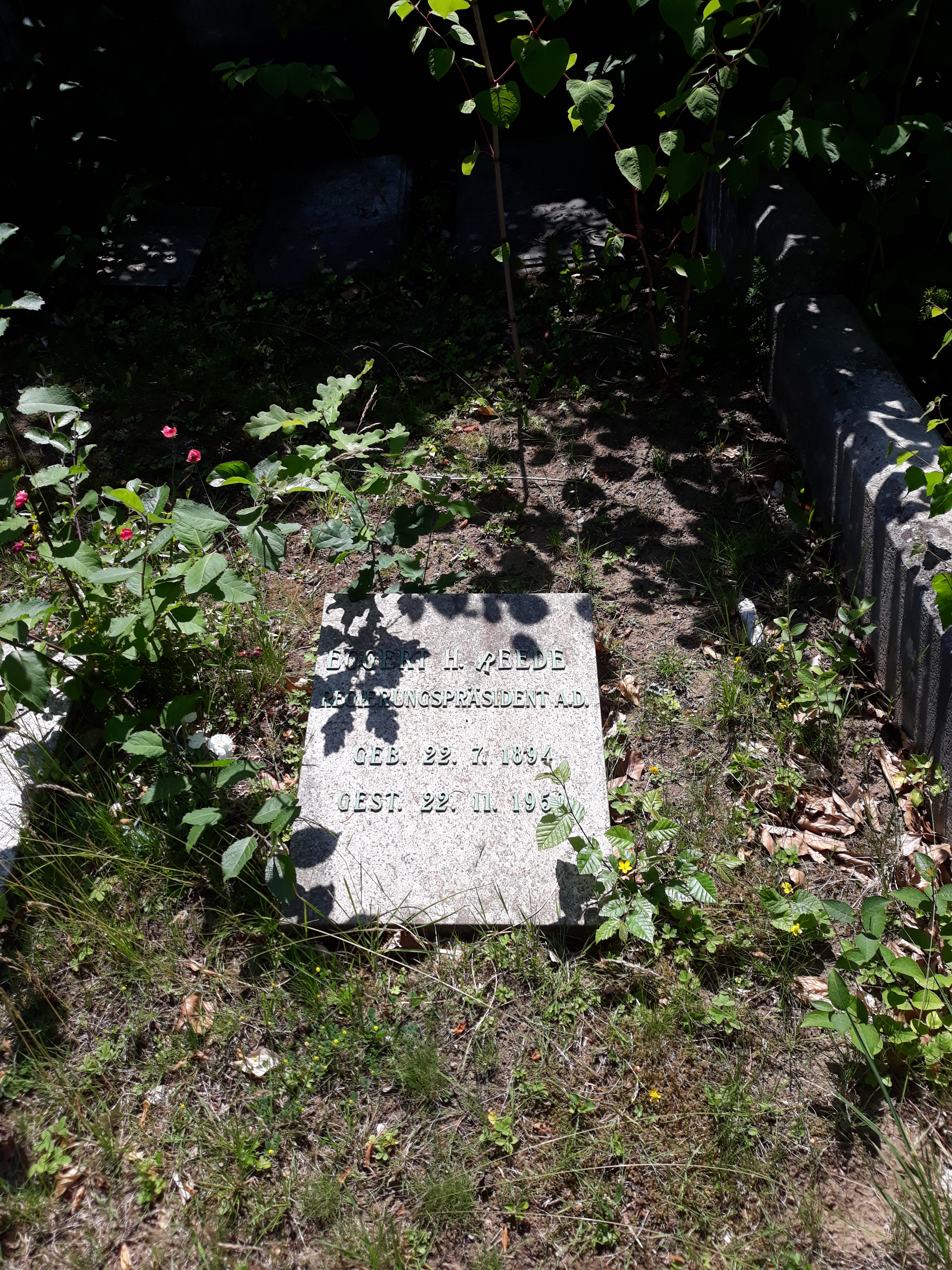
- The grave of Eggert Reeder (Reformierter Friedhof Hochstraße (Wuppertal)
- Born: 22 July 1894; Poppenbüll, German Empire
- Died: 22 November 1959 (aged 65); Wuppertal, West Germany
- Military career
- Allegiance: German Empire; Nazi Germany
- Service years: 1914–1918; 1939–1945
- Rank: SS-Gruppenführer
- Awards: Grand Cross of the Order of Leopold

Eggert Reeder (22 July 1894, Poppenbüll – 22 November 1959, Wuppertal) was a German jurist, civil servant, and district president of several regions. He was a member of the Schutzstaffel, where he obtained the rank of SS-Gruppenführer. Reeder served as civilian administrator of Wehrmacht occupied Belgium and northern France when Nazi Germany occupied those countries during World War II.

== Early life ==
Joining the Imperial German Army straight from school, he served on various fronts during World War I. At the end of the war, he joined the University of Halle-Wittenberg in Halle, where he studied law and political science.

During this period he joined the Corps Palaiomarchia and also volunteered for the local Freikorps under Major-General Georg Ludwig Rudolf Maercker (1865–1924). In this role, Reeder became involved from February 1919 onwards in the brutal suppression of the strikes and riots in Halle, which occurred as a result of the November Revolution, and resulted in the abdication of the monarchy in the early days of the Weimar Republic.

After further study at the University of Kiel, from 1921 he was appointed a court clerk, and in 1922 a government clerk in the District government of Schleswig. From 1924 to 1929 he was an assessor in the Prussian district of Lennep, and then Cologne.

== NSDAP ==
Reeder joined the Nazi Party (NSDAP) on 1 May 1933. Appointed district governor of Flensburg, two months later he was appointed district president of the government of Aachen. On 9 July 1936 Reeder was appointed governor of Cologne. In 1938, the Belgian King Leopold III (1901–1983) appointed Reeder Grand Cross of the Order of Leopold.

At the outbreak of World War II in Europe, he joined the Schutzstaffel (SS) on 31 August 1939 as a Brigadefuhrer, and given the additional governorship of Düsseldorf. Reeder became key in the planning of the invasion of Belgium during the Phoney War.

== Administrator of Belgium ==
On 10 May 1940, the Wehrmacht invaded Luxembourg, the Netherlands, and Belgium under the operational plan Fall Gelb (Case Yellow).

Once the Wehrmacht had fully occupied Belgium, Adolf Hitler chose not to install a civilian government, unlike in the Netherlands, but to install a military government, headed by Alexander von Falkenhausen of the Wehrmacht. That intensified friction and disagreement between native-Belgian right-wing factions, including Verdinaso and Rexism nb forcing them to full collaboration with the occupying forces to gain influence. Hitler and SS leader Heinrich Himmler profited from the situation by increasing competition between various native-Belgian groups by founding some more extreme collaborationist organisations, including the 6th SS Volunteer Sturmbrigade Langemarck and DeVlag, the German-Flemish Workers Community. After Ward Hermans and René Lagrou had left the Flemish National Union (VNV) to form the Algemeene-SS Vlaanderen, its leader, Staf de Clercq, immediately chose to collaborate as well, despite prewar statements to the contrary.

Reeder was appointed head of the administrative staff of the Military Governor of Belgium and northern France under von Falkenhausen, who was in charge of all economic and political issues, and liaised with the occupation government in charge. As a result, Reeder's first official business in Düsseldorf was to appoint Vice President William Burandt as his interim-successor, but retained his position in Cologne.

=== Relationship with Robert de Foy ===
On their return to Belgium in July 1940, the Flemish-Nationalists complained to Reeder, who had De Foy arrested for the deportations. Instead of being sent to prison, De Foy was transported to Germany, initially held in a hotel in Münster, before being transported to Berlin. Questioned and held for a few weeks, he was released and told to make his way back to Belgium. In the meantime, Sicherheitsdienst (SD) Chief Reinhard Heydrich communicated directly to Reeder that de Foy was to remain in position and untouched.

From that point forward, a relationship of tension existed between de Foy and the Nazi occupying forces in Belgium. Although co-operative with them, de Foy had both his department and powers cut from then on, and it was not until after the Allied invasion of France and the oncoming collapse of Nazi control that the status quo was disrupted. Arriving in Brussels on 14 August 1940, de Foy resumed his duties, but the State Security Service had been abolished, and the activities of his residual department were now limited to the policing of aliens.

On 1 October 1943, de Foy succeeded Gaston Schuind as secretary general of the Department of Justice after he reached an agreement with Reeder that the autonomy of the Belgian justice system would be guaranteed. At the same time, the Wehrmacht took over the policing of aliens in Belgium, which had greatly escalated. That was in part aided by the fact that from July to September 1944, Reeder was appointed Deputy of the new Imperial Commissioner for occupied Belgium and northern France, the former Cologne and Aachen Gauleiter Josef Grohé (1902–1987).

=== Final Solution ===
Throughout his period of administration, Reeder had co-operated with both von Falkenhausen and later Grohé, together with the administrator of France Dr Werner Best, to try to apply the rules of the Hague Convention in their region, often against the wishes and instructions of their Wehrmacht and SS superiors. In part they were aided by an ongoing conflict between Himmler and Heydrich, which locally manifested itself as to who had what control over the still-existing Belgian Police.

Reeder was directly responsible for the destruction of "Jewish influence" in the Belgian economy. But to ensure that all the Belgian people co-operated in the German occupation, Reeder negotiated an agreement to allow native Belgian Jews to remain in Belgium. Part of this was the non-enforcement of the Reich Security Main Office order for all Jews to be marked by wearing a yellow Star of David at all times, until Helmut Knochen's conference in Paris on 14 March 1942.

While implementation of economic policy led to mass unemployment of Belgian Jewish workers, especially in the diamond business, Reeder's efforts preserved existing national administrative structures and business relations within Belgium and northern France during the German occupation. 2,250 of these unemployed Belgian Jews were sent to forced labour camps in Northern France (still under Reeder's control), in order to build the Atlantic Wall for Organisation Todt.

The one attempt at the mass deportation of Belgian Jews, on 3 September 1943, proved a failure. After Wehrmacht raids, hundreds of Antwerp Jews were taken in furniture vans from their homes to Mechelen transit camp. Soon afterwards, Reeder ordered their release at the direct request of Queen Elisabeth of Bavaria and Cardinal Jozef-Ernest van Roey, and the attempt was not repeated. It was hence reported as "impossible" by local SS units charged with meeting Final Solution targets to find enough stateless and foreign Jews to fill another Auschwitz transport after 20 September 1943, but 1,800 Jews of various privileged categories were taken in 1944 to camps including Theresienstadt and Bergen-Belsen.

This meant that although 43,000 Jews left Belgium under the Final Solution up until the end of occupation in 1945, many of these in the early months of occupation, this approximated to the number of non-Belgian Jews who had been resident in Belgium before the war, according to lists compiled by de Foy. Post war, historians estimated that only 6% of Belgian Jews were arrested and sent to camps in the east; 13,000 of the non-Belgian Jews transported from the territory died.

=== 1944–1945 ===
Eggert was promoted SS-Gruppenführer on 9 November 1943. With both the buildup of the US Army in England from 1944, and the advancement of the Soviet Red Army in the east, the Nazi occupation in the west became more focused on the final solution. After the Allied Forces invasion of Normandy in June, the Nazis relieved de Foy of his position, in part driven by the rumours that he was "London's man," having made contact according to post-War records with the Belgian Resistance via both Walter Ganshof van der Meersch and William Ugeux.

After Robert Jan Verbelen was made head of the De Vlag Veiligheidscorps, a Nazi SS security force in Belgium, and a failed attempt to execute De Foy by firing squad, he was placed in jail. As the Allies entered Belgium, De Foy was released and went into hiding. Reeder was taken prisoner on 18 April 1945 and held in Belgium until the summer of 1947.

== Later life ==
Reeder was placed on trial in Belgium on 9 March 1951 and defended by the lawyer Ernst Achenbach. Reeder and Alexander von Falkenhausen were tried for their role in the deportation of more than 30,000 Jews from Belgium but not for their deaths in Auschwitz. Both were found guilty on 9 July 1951 and sentenced to 12 years hard labour in Germany. On return to West Germany, they were pardoned by Chancellor Konrad Adenauer on 30 July 1951, and Reeder subsequently retired at his own request. It was Reeder's efforts to preserve existing national administrative structures and business relations within Belgium and northern France during the German occupation and the delayed and incomplete efforts to inflict the Final Solution on Belgian Jews that spared Reeder and gained him enough credit to earn a pardon.

== Sources ==
- Max Rehm: Eggert Reeder, 22. Max Rehm: Eggert Reeder, 22 Juli 1894 - 22. July 1894 - 22 November 1959, Preußischer Regierungspräsident, Militärverwaltungschef, Staatsbürger, Nürtingen (Selbstverl), 1976 November 1959, Prussian government president, military chief administrator, citizen, Nürtingen (self-Verl), 1976
- Eggert Reeder/Walter Hailer: Die Militärverwaltung in Belgien und Nordfrankreich, in Reich, Volksordnung, Lebensraum Zeitschrift für völkische Verfassung und Verwaltung, Nr. 6, 1943, S. 7 – 52 Eggert Reeder / Walter Hailer: the military administration in Belgium and northern France, in Reich, Public Order, habitat Journal of ethnic and constitutional administration, No. 6, 1943, p. 7-52
- Katrin-Isabel Krähling: Das Devisenschutzkommando Belgien, 1940–1944; Magisterarbeit, Konstanz, 2005: [1] Katrin-Isabel Krähling: The Currency Protection Command Belgium, 1940–1944, MA thesis, Konstanz, 2005: [1]
- Andreas Nielsen: The occupation of Belgium and France (1940–1944) and the archives of the German military administration
- Holocaust Education & Archive Research Team: The Destruction of the Jews of Belgium (English)
- Herwig Jacquemyn: Belgie in de Tweede Wereldoorlog, Deel 2 - En BeZet country; Chapter 4: Een paradoxaal Driespan (Falk home / Harbou / owner), 2008: [3] (Ndl)
