= Gerard De Paep =

Belgian politician (1898–1985)

- Constituency: Sint-Niklaas – Dendermonde

Municipal councilor of Beveren
- In office 1932–1936

Provincial Councilor of East Flanders
- In office 1929–1944

Deputy of East Flanders
- In office 1930–1932

Deputy of East Flanders
- In office 1936–1944

Acting Governor of East Flanders
- In office 1943–1943

Senator
- In office 1965–1974

Member of the Cultural Council for the Dutch Cultural Community
- In office 1971–1974

Personal details
- Born: 22 November 1898 Melsele, Belgium
- Died: 18 August 1985 (aged 86) Beveren, Belgium
- Party: 1919–1935: Frontpartij; 1935–1944: VNV ????-1944: DeVlag; 1965–1985: Volksunie
- Occupation: Politician physician

Gerard Jan Florimond De Paep (Melsele, 22 November 1898 – Beveren, 18 August 1985) was a Belgian physician, surgeon, and Flemish nationalist politician for the VNV, DeVlag, and Volksunie.

== Biography ==
=== Early life and education ===
Gerard De Paep nació en Melsele como el undécimo hijo de una familia católica acomodada, de orientación flamenca y dedicada a la agricultura. Fue el único de sus hermanos al que se le permitió acceder a la educación superior. Entre 1912 y 1918, cursó estudios en el Sint-Jozef-Klein-Seminarie de Sint-Niklaas, institución que en ese momento utilizaba el francés como lengua de enseñanza. Durante su etapa escolar, participó en diversas organizaciones estudiantiles influenciadas por el pensamiento de Albrecht Rodenbach, entre ellas la Wase Studentengilde y la asociación Vlaams en Vrij de Beveren.

En septiembre de 1918, De Paep se inscribió en la carrera de medicina en la Universidad de Gante, que durante la ocupación alemana había sido temporalmente flamandizada bajo el nombre de universidad von Bissing. Sin embargo, la institución fue cerrada apenas ocho días después de su inscripción, debido a su asociación con el activismo flamenco durante la guerra. En febrero de ese mismo año, había participado en una manifestación activista de gran envergadura en Amberes.

Tras el fin del conflicto, y ante la reinstauración del francés como idioma principal en las universidades belgas, De Paep fue incluido en una lista negra estudiantil. Para continuar su formación médica, se matriculó bajo el seudónimo de "Jan De Paepe" en la Université libre de Bruxelles, donde se graduó en 1925.

=== Medical career ===
In 1925, Gerard De Paep established himself as a surgeon in Beveren, where in 1927, in collaboration with the Sisters of Charity of Saint Vincent de Paul, he founded the Sint-Anna Clinic in an old convent building, without municipal support. Under his initiative, between 1931 and 1933, a modern operating room, a maternity ward, and a children's home were constructed. In 1932, De Paep also established an evening nursing school connected to the clinic, where he himself taught. Due to the professional yet warm approach of De Paep and his team, the hospital quickly gained popularity and was modernized and expanded under his leadership from the 1950s onward.

=== Political career ===
As a 21-year-old student, De Paep co-founded the Waasland branch of the Flemish nationalist Frontpartij in 1919 (which ran in Beveren as the Catholic Flemish People's Party). In 1929, at the request of Amedee Verbruggen, he led the East Flanders list for the provincial elections and was elected. After difficult negotiations with the Catholic Party, he served as Permanent Deputy from 1930 to 1932, becoming the first-ever Flemish nationalist deputy in Belgium. He was responsible for public welfare and health and was known for his pragmatism and restraint.

From 1932 to 1936, De Paep was a municipal councilor in Beveren, first for the Front Party and from 1934, when the pluralistic Front Party gradually merged into the right-wing authoritarian VNV (VNV), for the Vlaamsch Nationale Volkspartij, the name of the municipal VNV lists. In the parliamentary elections of November 1932, he led the Front Party list for the Chamber in the arrondissement of Sint-Niklaas but was not elected. However, with 1,924 preferential votes, he was elected a week later as the first substitute to the East Flanders provincial council. When De Paep was the lead candidate for the provincial council elections in 1936, the Vlaamsch Nationaal Blok (a cartel list of VNV and independent Flemish nationalists) nearly doubled its votes. He extended his provincial mandate and took office as deputy for the second time, once again in a coalition with the Catholic party.

Although he was elected as the lead candidate for the Katholiek Vlaams Concentratieblok (a cartel of VNV and the splinter group Christian Middle Class Federation) in the 1938 municipal elections, De Paep did not take his seat due to incompatibility with his office in the provincial executive deputation.

During the German occupation in World War II, De Paep remained a member of the VNV, which collaborated with the Germans, and its paramilitary wing, the Dietsche Militie – Zwarte Brigade. He was also a 'cell leader' of the DeVlag. On 21 August 1940, the occupier appointed him as commissioner-mayor, but as this was incompatible with his provincial mandate, municipal official Armand Claes succeeded him. At the end of 1941, he became chairman of the East Flanders provincial cultural service, which aimed to streamline cultural life within the framework of the New Order. From 30 March 1943, he served as interim provincial governor. Opinions on De Paep's role during the war vary. He provided the population with extra food or coal, intervened to protect citizens, and prevented the execution of seven members of the Beveren Witte Brigade. At the same time, he cooperated with the occupier. The extent of De Paep's involvement in a razzia by the Feldgendarmerie (German military police) in the municipalities of Burcht, Zwijndrecht, and Beveren on the night of 27–28 April 1944, was never fully clarified and was ultimately not included in his criminal file.

After the liberation in 1944, De Paep was suspended as a provincial councilor and deputy and was sentenced to three years in prison for political collaboration. He served his sentence in the Internment camp Lokeren, Dendermonde, Ghent, and Sint-Gillis. However, his case was reopened, and in February 1949, he was sentenced by the Military Court to five years' imprisonment, later increased to twelve years. He was also ordered to pay compensation to widows of several men who had perished in a concentration camp due to his actions. He was released early in 1950, and in 1962, he was rehabilitated and cleared of all blame by the Court of Appeal.

After his release, De Paep resumed his medical practice at the Sint-Annakliniek. He continued performing surgeries until the age of eighty, totaling more than 60,000 procedures over his career. Due to his self-proclaimed "ongoing struggle for social justice for the farming community," he became a promoter and co-founder of the General Farmers' Syndicate in November 1962, and re-entered politics, this time for the Volksunie. From 1965 to 1974, De Paep served in the Senate as a directly elected senator for the arrondissement of Dendermonde-Sint-Niklaas. In the elections of 1965, 1968, and 1971, he obtained a high number of preferential votes. From December 1971 to March 1974, he also served in the Cultural Council for the Dutch Cultural Community due to the then-existing dual mandate. In 1974, he retired from politics due to his advanced age. By the end of his political career, he believed that the Volksunie had become too progressive. Besides his professional and political activities, De Paep was also a board member of the Eural Savings Bank in the 1970s.

== Tribute ==
- Under the initiative of Maurits Coppieters, the 'Dr. Gerard De Paep Foundation' was established in January 1970. The purpose of the non-profit organization was to promote the historiography of the Flemish nationalist struggle in the twentieth century. After its dissolution in 1976, the foundation was succeeded by the Dr. Gerard De Paep Fund. Award-winning authors include Hendrik Elias, Guido Provoost, Wim Van Den Steene, and Jan Torfs.
- As the founder of the Sint-Anna Clinic, Dr. De Paep received the honorary title of Officer in the Order of Leopold II in 1977.
- After prolonged political disagreement and conflicting advice from the Beveren Cultural Council, a new street in the Beveren sub-municipality of Melsele was finally named after him in October 2010.
- In tribute to his social contributions, Gerard De Paep was honored with a permanent exhibition featuring unique photographs in the Beveren senior residence Meulenberg in March 2020. According to his wishes, a residence with service flats was built in 1985 on the park estate, an outbuilding of the Molenberg Castle, which De Paep purchased in 1938 for his family home and medical practice.

Gerard De Paep died on 18 August 1985. In his eulogy and memorial card, written by his personal friend and poet Anton van Wilderode, he was praised as a skilled and people-oriented physician and a conscientious Flemish nationalist.

== Literature ==
- L. Denis and K. Papin, AZ Nikolaas, 2012.
- Kristof LOOCKX, Beveren students at the Flemish University during World War I: self-improvement, rapprochement, language, and religion, in: Het Land van Beveren, 2015, p. 172-192.
- R. PUYNEN, Gerard De Paep, in: Beverenaars of the Twentieth Century, 2001, p. 102-109.
- W. VAN DAM, The breakthrough of organized political Flemish nationalism in Beveren 1928–1929, in: Het Land van Beveren, 2007, p. 493-524.
- Julien VAN REMOORTERE, Gerard De Paep – a life of people-oriented loyalty, Paperback, 1989, 125 p.
- Nico WOUTERS, The De Paep case (1898–1985): war memory, image formation, and local historiography, in Het Land van Beveren, vol. 52, 2009, no. 1, p. 25-64.
- Nico WOUTERS, Gerard De Paep in The fountains of the Orange Mountain, political-institutional history of the province of East Flanders from 1830 to now, part 4, 1993, pp. 244–255.
- Nico WOUTERS, Flemish nationalists in the East Flanders Provincial Council (1929–1940), in: Scientific Journals, 2002, p. 3-30.
