= Ward Hermans =

Belgian politician and writer

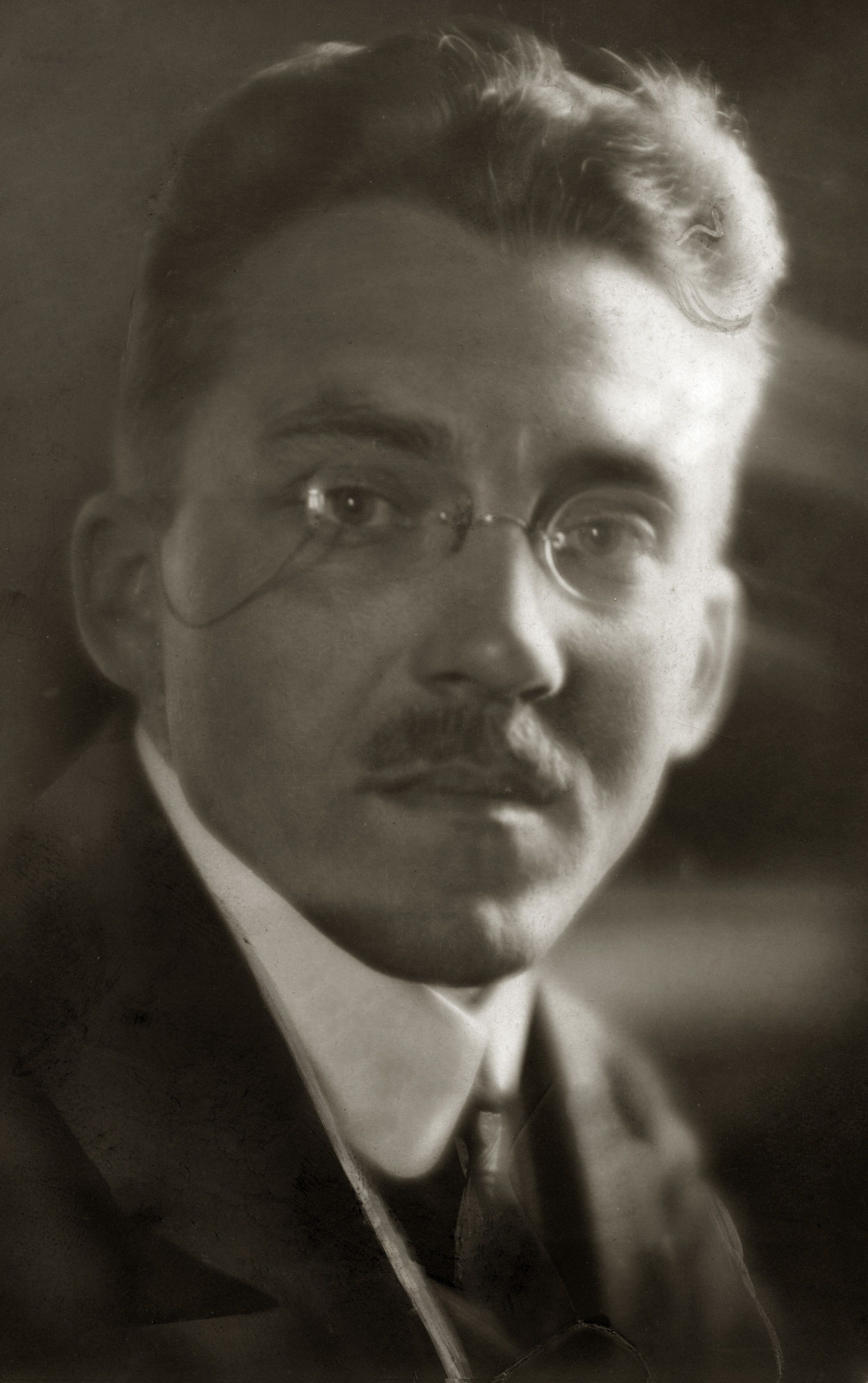
- Ward Hermans in 1929
- Born: Cornelius Eduardus Hermans; 6 February 1897; Turnhout, Belgium
- Died: 23 November 1992 (aged 95); Deurne, Belgium
- Occupations: politician, writer

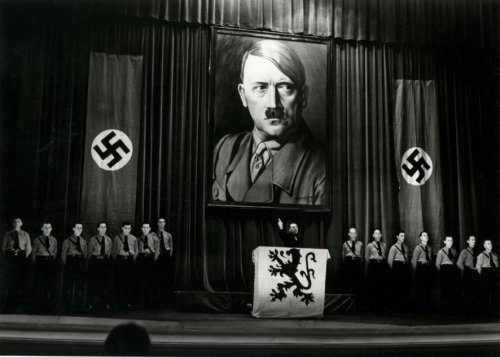
Hermans at a Nazi Party rally in 1941

Cornelius Eduardus Hermans (6 February 1897 – 23 November 1992) was a Belgian Flemish nationalist politician and writer.

Hermans saw service with the Belgian Army during the First World War before becoming involved in politics as a member of the nationalist Frontpartij. As punishment for his involvement in the Flemish Movement, he was sent to the Special Forestry Platoon, a Belgian penal military unit located in Orne, Normandy, France in July 1918, where he worked as a woodchopper as a form of penal labour.

After the war, Hermans served the Frontparij in the Belgian parliament from 1929 to 1932. He quit the Frontpartij in 1933 to join Verdinaso and soon became known for his pro-Nazi stance in journals such as De Schelde, Volk en Staat, and Strijd. His membership came to an end the following year when he argued with Joris van Severen and left the group to join the Flemish National Union. Serving as an arrondissement leader for the group from 1935 to 1940, he also returned to parliament as a VNV representative from 1939 to 1944.

Hermans became an enthusiastic collaborator with Nazi Germany after the German invasion of Belgium in 1940. The same year, Hermans, along with René Lagrou, was the founder of the Algemeene-SS Vlaanderen, the Flemish Schutzstaffel. Having left his official engagements with VNV in October 1940 to concentrate on this assignment, he also edited the new movement's journal SS-Man. In the later years of the war Hermans went to Germany to broadcast propaganda over the radio in Bremen.

Hermans was sentenced to death in absentia after the Second World War, but he was not arrested until his capture in Germany in November 1946. He was returned to Belgium where his sentence was commuted to life imprisonment, and he was released in 1955. He largely remained aloof from political involvement following his release, apart from a spell in the Order of Flemish Militants during the 1970s, before his death on 23 November 1992.
