= Jean-Baptiste de Dobbeleer =

19th-century Belgian architect

- Born: 22 June 1784; Brussels, Austrian Netherlands
- Died: 21 December 1868 (aged 84); Saint-Josse-ten-Noode, Belgium
- Other name: Jean-Baptiste de Dobbeleer-Dellafaille
- Occupation: Architect
- Partner: Marie-Louise Dellafaille
- Awards: Knight of the Order of Leopold

Jean-Baptiste de Dobbeleer-Dellafaille, born on 22 June 1784 in Brussels and died on 21 December 1868 in Saint-Josse-ten-Noode, was a Belgian architect.

== Biography ==
Jean-Baptiste de Dobbeleer was born on 22 June 1784 in Brussels. He was educated at the Collège Thérésien in Brussels and at the École Centrale of Brussels. He had a brother, Charles and two sisters, Barbara and Marie-Catherine de Dobbeleer.

In 1815 he married Marie-Louise Dellafaille and took the name 'de Dobbeleer-Dellafaille'. In 1829 his wife died childless in Antwerp.

On 21 December 1868 de Dobbeleer died in Saint-Josse-ten-Noode.

== Career ==
de Dobbeleer began his career in 1804 as a trainee in the road construction department of the Province of Antwerp. In 1809 he started studying at the École Spéciale d'Architecture in Paris.

In 1814 de Dobbeleeer was appointed inspector of the department of the Deux-Nèthes and, a year later, he was rewarded by William I of the Netherlands with the title of honorary architect of the Antwerp Palaces before being appointed by Royal order in 1816 as first class engineer in Rijkswaterstaat and also worked in the Public Works corps of the Province of Antwerp as chief engineer.

In 1833 he was appointed as second class chief engineer by Leopold I of Belgium and was also decorated as a Knight of the Order of Leopold.

== Works ==
The plans drawn up by de Dobbeleer mainly represent bridges, locks, roads and levees, but he also built barracks, prisons and remand prisons. For example, he drew up plans for the Antwerp prison and the St. Bernard's reformatory in the abbey building and was especially renowned for the reconstruction of the many roads and bridges that were destroyed during the Napoleonic Wars.

More than 130 plans that he designed or that belonged to him are preserved in the Moretus Plantin University Library (in Namur, Belgium) and some of them are accessible on the Neptun platform (Numérisation du Patrimoine de l'Université de Namur = Digitisation of the Heritage of the Université de Namur).
