= Antwerp prison =

Prison in Antwerp, Belgium

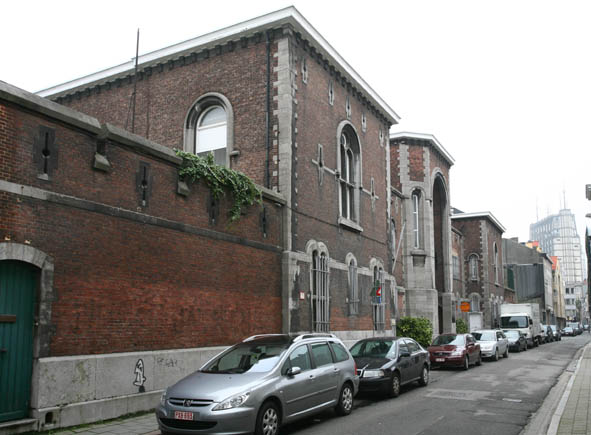
- Front of the prison complex at Begijnenstraat (2007)
- Interactive map of Antwerp prison
- Location: 40–42 Begijnenstraat, Antwerp, Belgium; 51°12′47.6″N 4°24′00.02″E
- Status: Operational
- Security class: Remand house
- Opened: 1855
- Managed by: Federal Public Service Justice
- Director: An Janssens

Antwerp prison (Gevangenis van Antwerpen) is a nineteenth-century prison complex located at Begijnenstraat in the port city of Antwerp, Belgium. Built in the 1850s to plans by architect Joseph Jonas Dumont as part of Édouard Ducpétiaux’s modernisation of the Belgian penal system, it remains in use as Antwerp’s principal remand facility. The star-shaped complex combines Neo-Romanesque architecture with a panopticon layout inspired by London’s Pentonville model. During the Second World War several prominent collaborators and nationalists were held and deported from the prison. Chronic overcrowding and infrastructure problems have drawn criticism in the 21st century, leading to plans for a replacement facility.

== History ==
The present Antwerp prison was erected between 1854 and 1859 on the site of a former Capuchin sisters’ convent. Dumont, who also designed the Leuven central prison, implemented Ducpétiaux’s preference for the cellular Pennsylvania system and for panoptic surveillance; his plans arranged four radial cell wings around a central observation pavilion. The prison, inaugurated in 1855, served as both a remand house and place of detention.

During the German invasion of Belgium in May 1940 the prison contained several Flemish nationalist and collaborationist leaders, including August Borms, René Lagrou, René Lambrichts and others. As German forces approached, the Belgian authorities evacuated these detainees from Antwerp to other prisons and camps in Belgium and France on 13 May 1940. A memorial plaque at the prison entrance honours executed and political prisoners from both world wars.

== Modern operation ==
The prison complex combines Neo-Romanesque detailing with a star-shaped panopticon layout. The front consists of a three-storey rectangular block flanked by two service wings; its round-arched windows, brick cornices and octagonal entrance give the façade a Romanesque character. Behind the gatehouse a barrel-vaulted gallery leads to a central observation pavilion from which four radial cell wings extend, allowing guards to monitor the corridors. Each wing comprises three levels of single-occupancy cells arranged along open galleries. The design implements the cellular system promoted by Ducpétiaux and influenced by the Eastern State Penitentiary in Philadelphia and Pentonville prison in London.

The Begijnenstraat prison remains Antwerp’s main remand facility and is managed by the Federal Public Service Justice. It houses male detainees awaiting trial or transfer and includes a separate women’s wing and a psychiatric annex. In the early 21st century the ageing complex became notorious for overcrowding and poor conditions. In March 2024 a 41-year-old detainee was tortured for several days by cellmates in an overcrowded cell; trade unions blamed the incident on understaffing and cells housing six men despite being designed for three. Statistics released in June 2024 showed Belgium had 115 prisoners for every 100 places and highlighted the Antwerp torture case in debates on prison reform. An investigation by New Lines Magazine reported that the prison required about 500 staff but had some sixty vacancies, contributing to dangerous conditions.

Because the nineteenth-century prison is considered inadequate for modern detention policy and suffers from overcrowding, the Belgian building authority (Régie des Bâtiments) and Justice ministry have commissioned a new prison at the Blue Gate site in the south of Antwerp. The project, launched in 2023 as a public–private partnership known as “Hortus Conclusus”, will provide space for approximately 440 detainees: 330 male prisoners, 66 female prisoners and 44 places in a medical and psychiatric unit. Construction began in 2023 and the facility is scheduled to open in spring 2026.
