= Everbeek =

Everbeek Everbecq
- Village
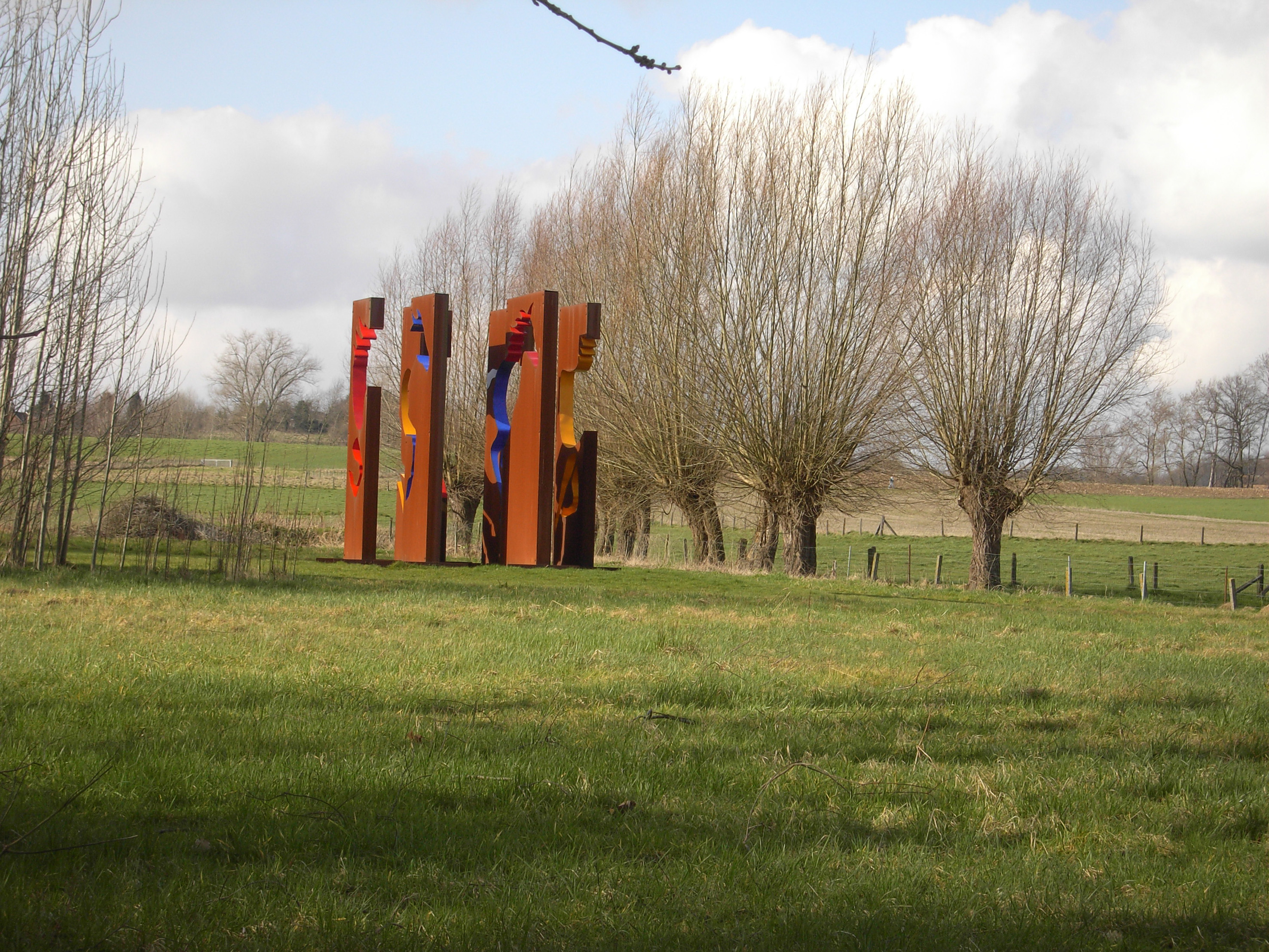
- Everbeek-Beneden (2008)

- Location in Belgium
- Coordinates: 50.76258°N 3.80835°E
- Country: Belgium
- Region: Flemish Region
- Province: East Flanders
- Municipality: Brakel

Area
  - Total: 13.76 km^{2} (5.31 sq mi)

Population (2022)
  - Total: 2,133
  - Density: 155.0/km^{2} (401.5/sq mi)
- Time zone: CET

Everbeek (French: Everbecq) is a village situated in the Flemish Ardennes and in the Denderstreek in Belgium. In 1977, it was included into the municipality of Brakel. Although it is Dutch speaking, this village was part of the Walloon province of Hainaut (Henegouwen) until 1963, when it became part of the Flemish province of East Flanders.

== History ==
The area had been inhabited since Roman times. In 2019, a Roman silver treasure had been discovered in a wasteland in Everbeek. The municipality was first mentioned in the 11th century. The oldest settlement is Everbeek-Beneden which is located in the valley. A new settlement was later built on the hill and has become known as Everbeek-Boven.

In 1333, the villages became part of Hainaut. In 1963, the municipality was moved to the East Flanders province, because it was a Flemish speaking area unlike Hainaut which is French speaking. The municipality was merged into Brakel in 1977.

== Nature ==
The Everbeekse Forests consist of collection of old forests scattered around the village. In the spring there is an abundance of hyacinths and windflowers. The area has several sources and brooks. The forests are home to birds of prey, squirrels, and garden dormice.

The forests are a protected nature reserve and have been included in the European Natura 2000 protection program.

== Notable people ==
- Staf De Clercq (1884–1942), Nazi collaborator and leader of the Vlaamsch Nationaal Verbond.
- Daniel Robberechts (1937–1992), author.

== Gallery ==
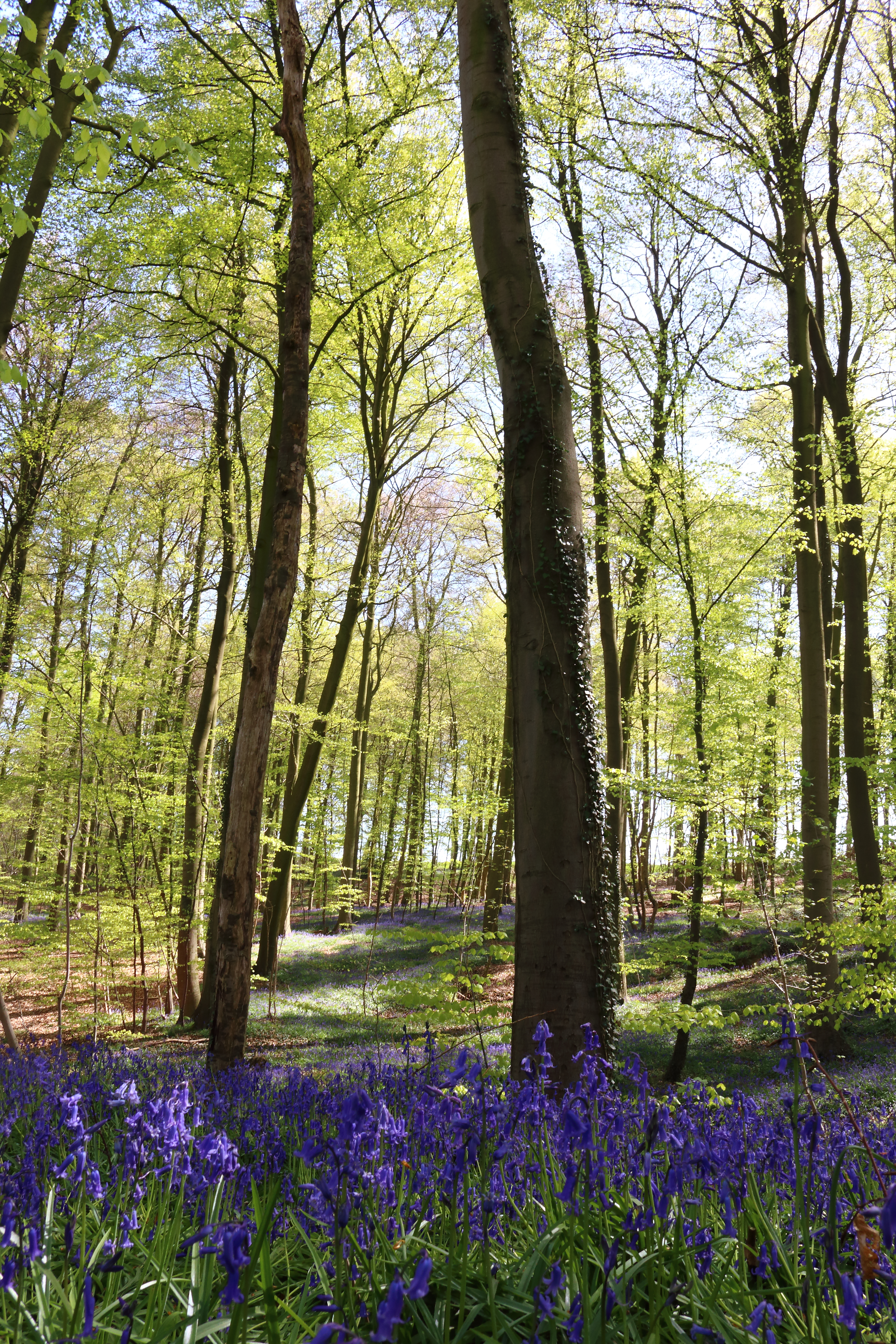
Everbeekse Forests

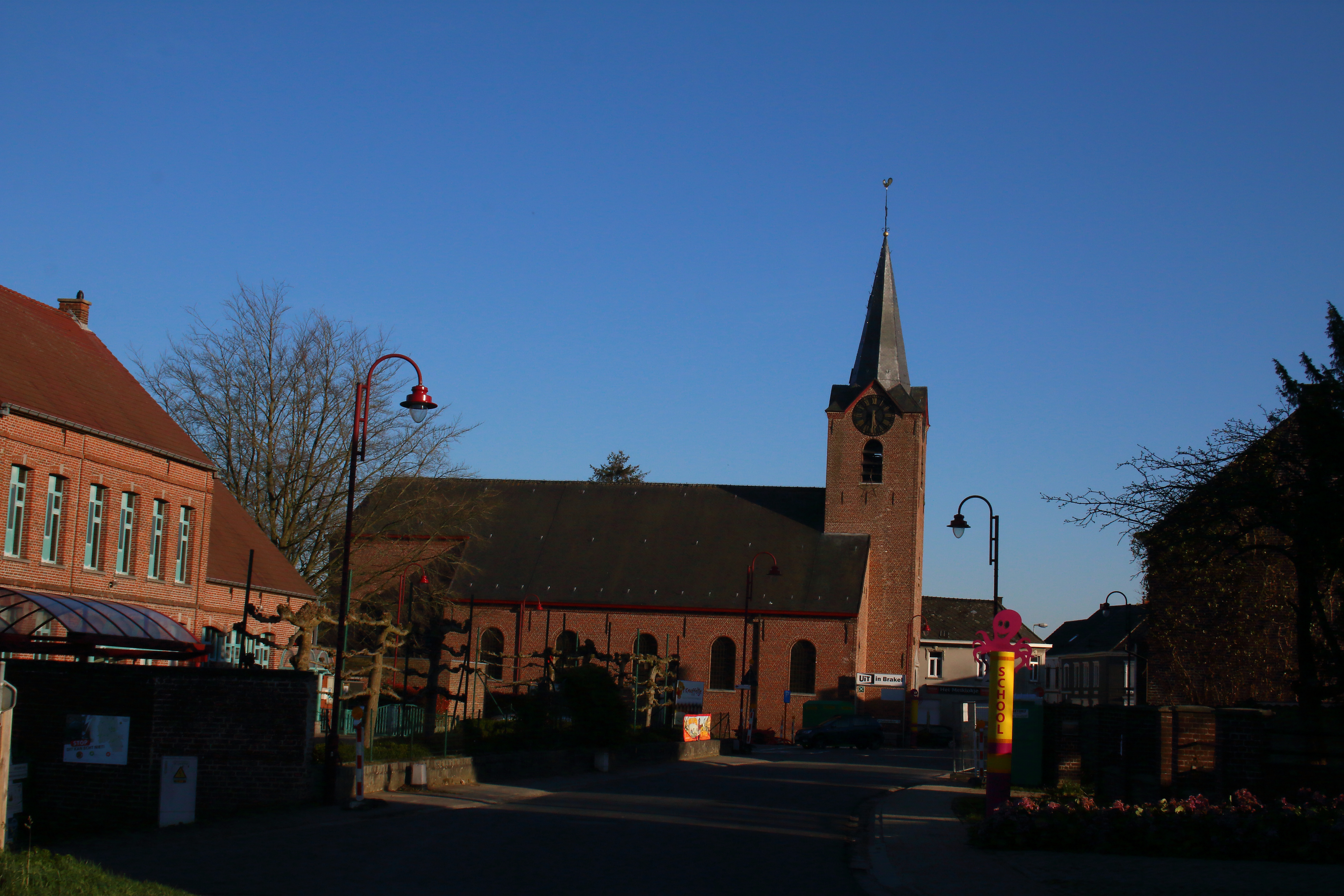
St Josef Church in Everbeek-Boven

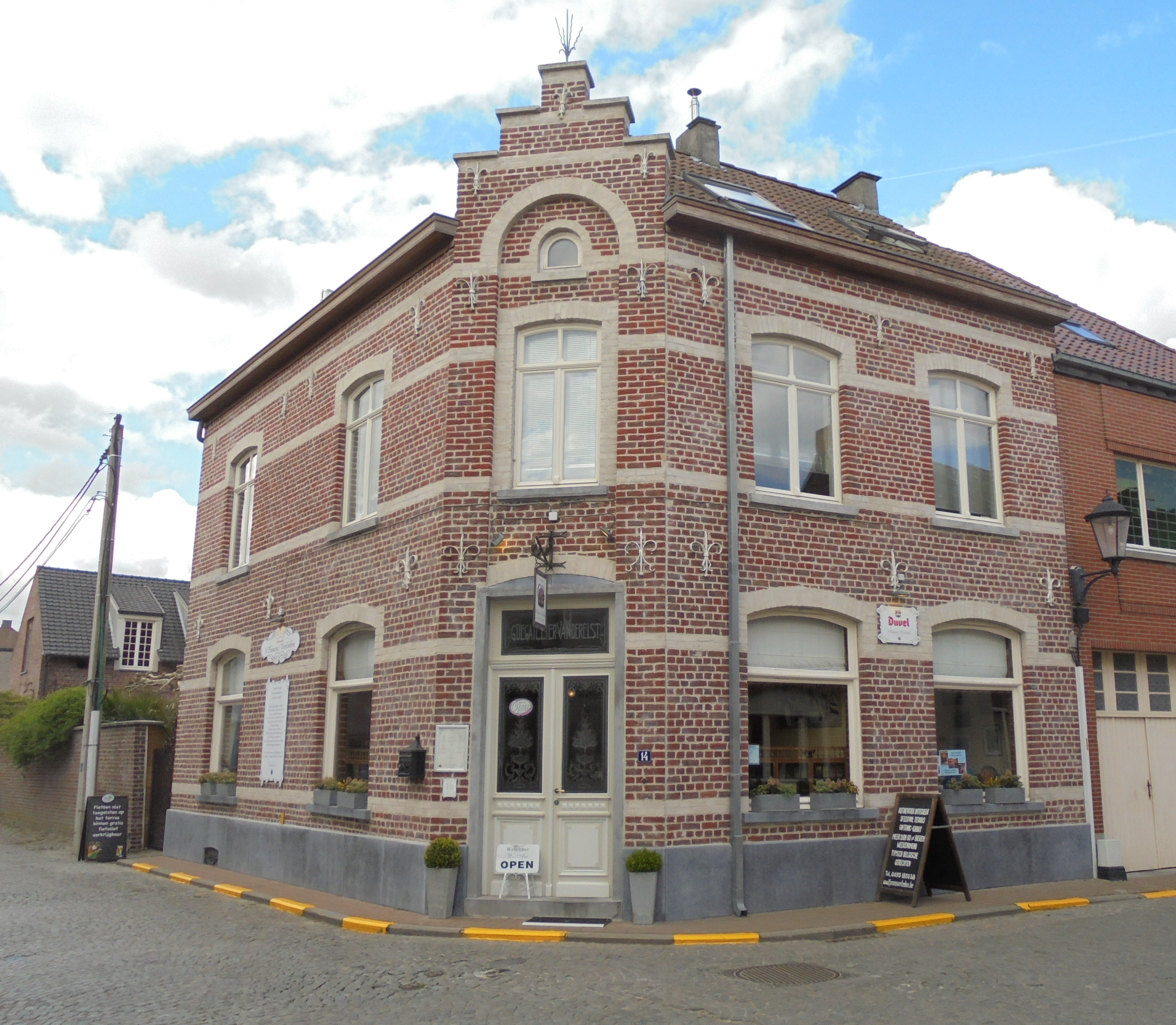
Pub in Everbeek-Beneden

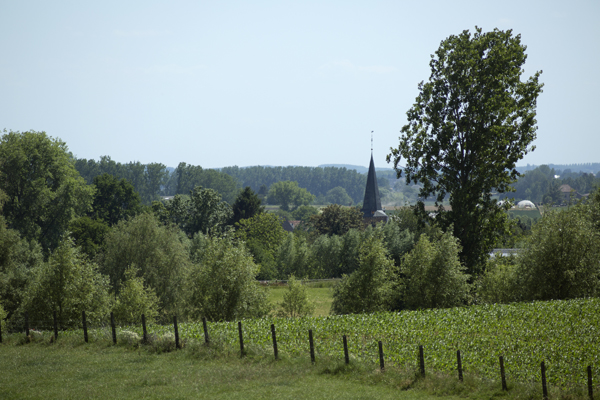
Landscape
