= Special Forestry Platoon =

Belgian Army penal military unit of World War I

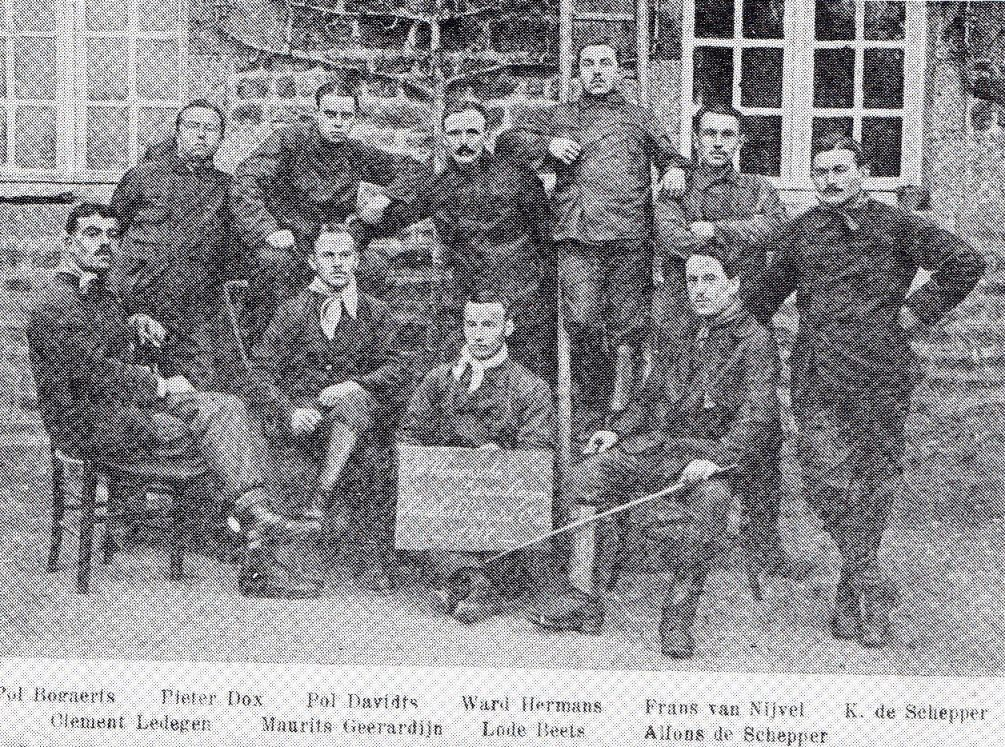
The Special Forestry Platoon in 1918

The Special Forestry Platoon (Peloton Spécial Forestier), nicknamed the woodchoppers of the Orne (Dutch: houthakkers van de Orne), was a non-combat penal military unit of the Belgian Army during World War I. As its name suggests, the unit specialized in forestry, specifically woodchopping, conducted as a form of penal labour.

The unit, stationed in Orne, Normandy, France, consisted of 10 Flemish soldiers placed in the unit in 1918 as punishment for their active or passive involvement in the Flemish Movement. Fearing that the soldiers would desert to the Central Powers if they were sent to the front line, they were instead kept in France to work as woodchoppers. The soldiers worked for 12 hours a day in harsh living conditions. They were paid 1 Belgian franc per day.

The 10 soldiers were Paul Davidts (oldest of the 10 and spokesperson of the group, lawyer and later acquitted by court-martial, Lode Beets, Pol Bogaert (from Mechelen), Alfons De Schepper, Karel-Lodewijk De Schepper, Pieter Dox (from Lier), Ward Hermans (writer, from Turnhout), Maurits Geerardyn, Clement Ledegen, and Frans Vannyvel. The attitude of the 10 soldiers was described as one of defeatism.

== See also ==
- Van Raemdonck brothers
- Frontbeweging
