= Cyriel Verschaeve =

Flemish nationalist priest and writer who collaborated with the Nazis

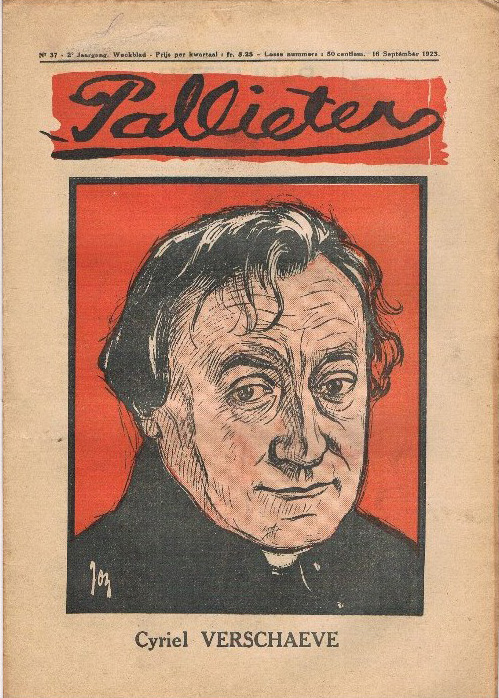
- Verschaeve (by Jos De Swert, 1923)
- Born: 30 April 1874; Ardooie, Belgium
- Died: 8 November 1949 (aged 75); Solbad Hall, Tyrol, Allied-occupied Austria
- Occupation(s): Priest, writer, SS recruitment

Cyriel Verschaeve (30 April 1874 – 8 November 1949) was a Flemish nationalist priest and writer who collaborated with the Nazis during the Second World War. He was recognised as the spiritual leader of Flemish nationalism by the ideology's adherents and a Nazi propagandist.

== Early years ==
Born in Ardooie in West Flanders, Belgium to a Catholic family, he began training to be a priest at the Minor Seminary, Roeselare in 1886, before moving on to Bruges in 1892 to complete his studies. He was ordained in 1897 and then continued his studies at the Friedrich Schiller University of Jena in Germany.

== Nationalist leader ==
He returned to Belgium in 1911 to become a parish priest at Alveringem in West Flanders. Whilst here he became involved in the pacifist movement after the outbreak of the First World War. He also was involved in the development of the Frontbeweging, a Flemish autonomous group that eventually became the Frontpartij. Along with August Borms, Verschaeve was the leading representative of the tendency within the Front Movement that felt Flemish aims might be aided by working with Germany, in contrast to the other wing that felt fighting for Belgium would make the Flemish case easier to advance. On 12 August 1917 Verschaeve penned a second so-called "Open Letter" calling for better rights for beleaguered Flemish servicemen. Following a letter from a month earlier, Verschaeve's missive was noted for its more militant language which included an attack on the king for his failure to respond to the first letter. It marked the beginning of a widening gulf between the monarchy and the far right of Flemish nationalism. In 1916 he also became president of a committee that sought to build a memorial to Flemish servicemen. After the war this aim was realised with the building of the Yser Tower memorial, with Verschaeve ceremonially laying the first stone on 7 July 1928.

== Second World War ==
Dismissed as chaplain in 1939, Verschaeve, who had long been sympathetic to Germany, wrote Het Uur van Vlaanderen in 1940 in which he articulated feelings of sympathy among the Flemish people for Nazi Germany, especially because of his Romantic admiration for German imperial culture as embodied in Richard Wagner. After the German occupation of Belgium, Verschaeve was appointed to a body set up by the Nazis to deal with Flemish culture. He also became involved with recruitment to the Flemish Legion in 1941. Verschaeve was convinced the Soviet Union was the greatest danger to peace and culture in Europe; he was strongly anti-communist and a convinced supporter of Nazism. In 1944 he held a meeting with SS-Reichsführer Heinrich Himmler about the Flemish question, although it achieved little as the Allied advance into Belgium was not far away, and Flanders would soon be liberated from Nazi control. Verschaeve told Himmler at this meeting that, while he rejected Nazi paganism, he thought Nazism could become complementary to the salvific message of the Church, as long as it remained political and activist. Until the end of the successful Allied offensive against the Nazi Wehrmacht in western Belgium, Verschaeve continued calling upon young Flemish, Catholic, adolescent boys to volunteer in the Waffen-SS foreign legions against Stalin and "Satanic Bolshevism".

== Death ==
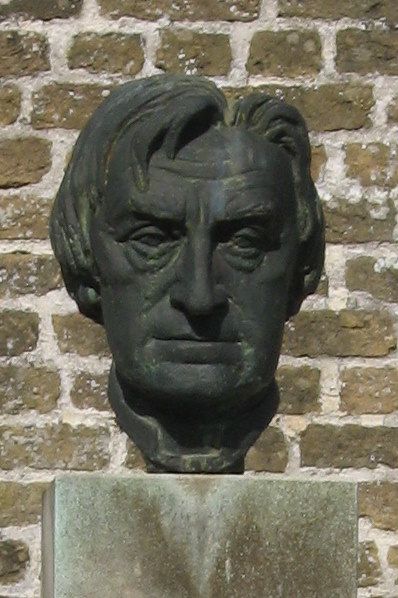
Statue of Verschaeve in Alveringem

He fled to Austria in 1945. He was condemned to death in absentia by a Belgian court, but survived in Austria until 1949, when he died of a heart attack at the vicarage of the Tyrolean town Solbad Hall, and was buried there. In 1973 members of the neo-Nazi Vlaamse Militanten Orde dug up his remains and reburied them in Flanders. He remains a celebrated figure amongst the more extreme ends of Flemish nationalism, and a symbol of disgraceful Flemish nationalism to French-speaking Catholics.

Streets in Kortrijk, Lanaken and Breendonk were named after him; in 2019-2020 the local councils decided to rename it.

== Writing ==
Verschaeve wrote extensively on philosophy, adopting a dramatic, poetic writing style. He was also known as a poet and playwright. As an author he wrote a number of plays dealing with historical and Biblical characters with Judas (1919) and Maria-Magdalena (1930) now widely held to be the best works from a prolific but sketchy output. His major works include:

- Jacob van Artevelde (1911)
- Zeesymphonieën (1911)
- Ferdinand Verbiest (1912)
- De schoonheid van het evangelie (1913)
- Passieverhaal (1913)
- Philips van Artevelde (1913)
- Nocturnen (1916–1924)
- Judas (1917)
- Het mysterie (1920)
- Uren bewondering voor groote kunstwerken (1920–1922)
- Maria Magdalena (1928)
- De Kruisboom (1929)
- Elijah (1936)
- Nocturnen (1936)
- Rubens, Vlaanderens Spectrum (1938)
- Jezus (1939)
- Eeuwige gestalten (1944)
