= Pieter Dox =

Belgian Army soldier and Roman Catholic missionary

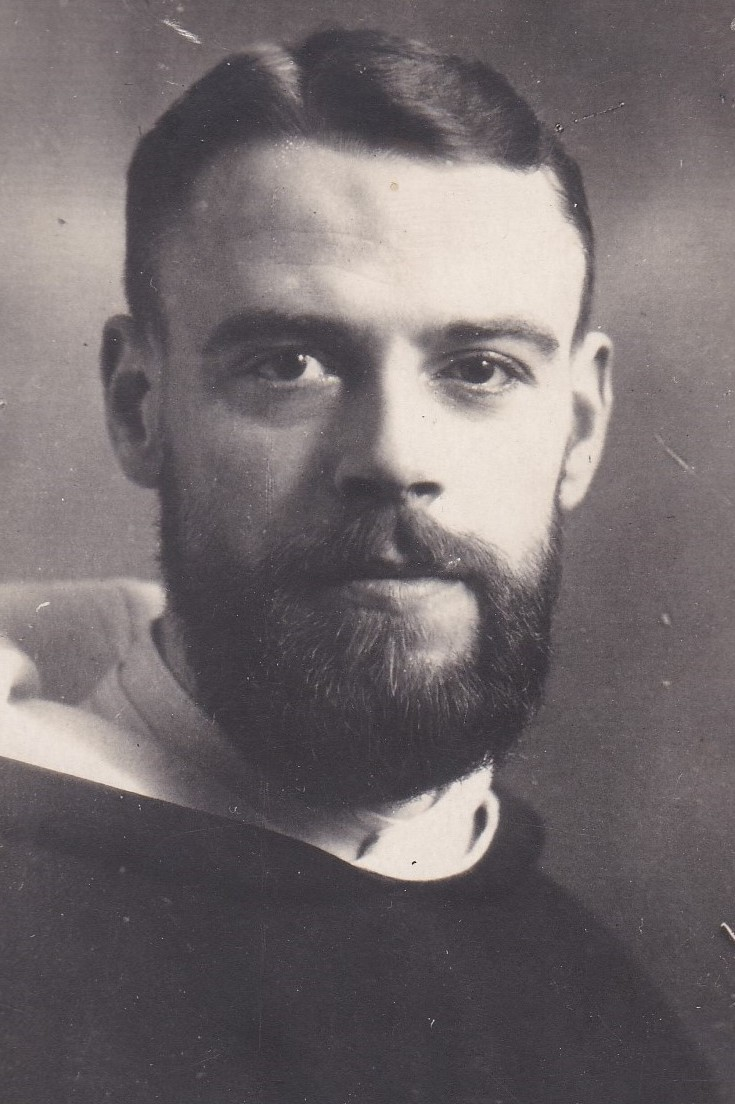
- Born: Petrus Joannes Maria Dox; 7 May 1898; Lier, Antwerp, Belgium
- Died: 26 November 1964 (aged 66); Watsa, Haut-Uélé, DR Congo
- Occupation: Christian missionary
- Military career
- Branch: Belgian Army
- Service years: 1916–1919
- Unit: Orne Woodchoppers
- Wars: World War I

Petrus Joannes Maria Dox (7 May 1898 – 26 November 1964) was a Belgian Flemish soldier during the First World War known for his opposition to the Belgian Army's French-speaking officers' discriminatory treatment of Flemish-speaking soldiers. His vocal criticism led to his dismissal from front line service and his reassignment to the Special Forestry Platoon, a penal military unit.

After the war, Dox moved to the Belgian Congo where he served as a Christian missionary for the next few decades. He was killed during the Simba rebellion in November 1964.

== Biography ==
=== World War I ===
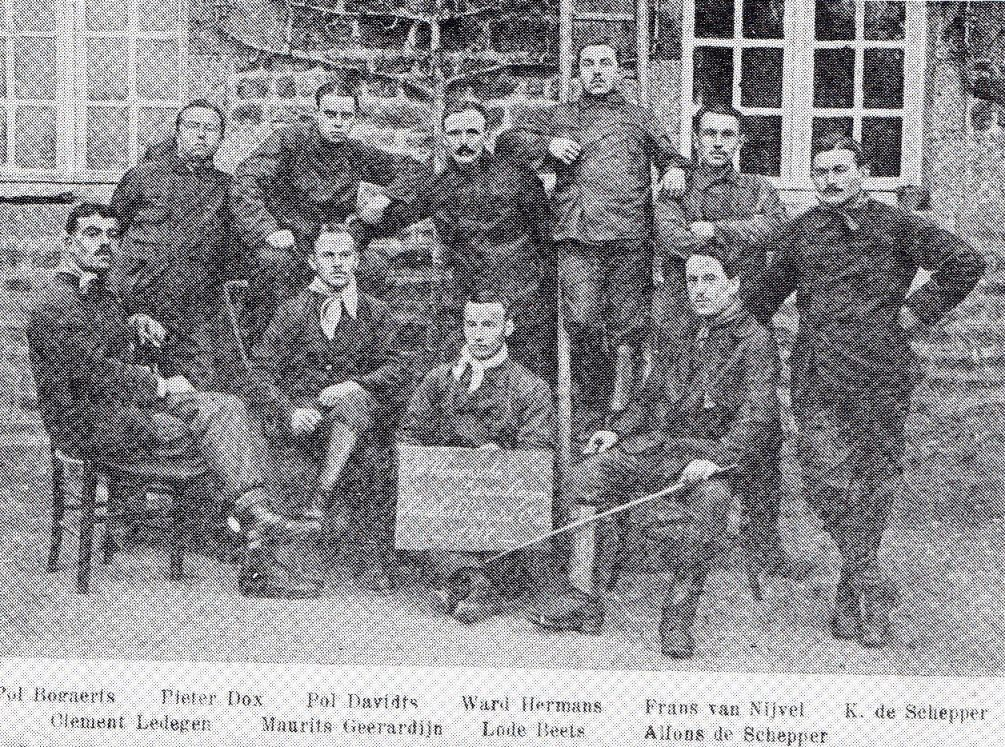
Dox (second from the left) in the Special Forestry Platoon in 1918

Around 1914, Dox joined the Dominican Order as a novice. In 1916, despite a Belgian royal decree that only men born before 1897 could be conscripted, he was drafted to fight in the First World War. As a member of the seminary, Dox had to serve in the medical corps, and after only a single month of training he was sent to the Western Front.

He was critical of the French-speaking officers' attitude towards Flemish-speaking soldiers, and wrote letters on the subject. This led to his demotion to a penal military unit, the Special Forestry Platoon, on 30 March 1918, where he worked as a woodchopper as a form of penal labour in Orne, Normandy, France. The military's official conclusion read: "Doubts regarding his patriotism. Has expressed hostility toward national institutes in a letter sent from neutral territory." (Note: Translated from French: "Douteux au point de vue patriotique et avoir exprimé dans une lettre envoyée en pays neutre des sentiments hostiles aux institutions nationales.") Dox was released eight months after the Armistice of 11 November 1918, on 10 July 1919.

One of his brothers, Ludovicus Gommarus, died in a German prisoner-of-war camp. His parents were also held captive by the German occupiers due to his father's participation in the resistance movement.

=== Missionary in Congo ===
Dox took his religious vows in Ghent on 7 November 1924, and moved to the Belgian Congo on 18 December 1928, to work as a missionary for the next 36 years under his priest name, Valentinus.

He and his brother Frans, who was also a missionary, were killed in Watsa during the Simba rebellion on 26 November 1964. In total, 15 Belgian missionaries were killed. A square in their hometown of Lier was named after him and his brother.

== See also ==
- Flemish identity during World War I
- Language legislation in Belgium
