= Veurne (Chamber of Representatives constituency) =

Belgian political subdivision

Veurne was a constituency used to elect a single member of the Belgian Chamber of Representatives between 1831 and 1900.

== Representatives ==
Election	Representative (Party)
1831	Charles Dubois (Liberal)
1833	Charles Dubois (Liberal)
1837	Charles Dubois (Liberal)
1841	Jean-Baptiste De Prey (Catholic)
1845	Joseph Clep (Catholic)
1848	Joseph Clep (Catholic)
1852	Pierre Calmeyn (Catholic)
1856	Pierre Calmeyn (Catholic)
1857	Jules Desmedt (Catholic)
1861	Jules Desmedt (Catholic)
1864	Jules Desmedt (Catholic)
1868	Edouard Bieswael (Liberal)
1870	Léon Visart de Bocarmé (Catholic)
1874	Léon Visart de Bocarmé (Catholic)
1878	Léon Visart de Bocarmé (Catholic)
1882	Léon Visart de Bocarmé (Catholic)
1886	Léon Visart de Bocarmé (Catholic)
1890	Léon Visart de Bocarmé (Catholic)
1892	Léon Visart de Bocarmé (Catholic)
1894	Léon Visart de Bocarmé (Catholic)
1898	Léon Visart de Bocarmé (Catholic)
1900	Merged into Veurne-Diksmuide-Ostend
