= Volk en Staat =

Belgian daily newspaper

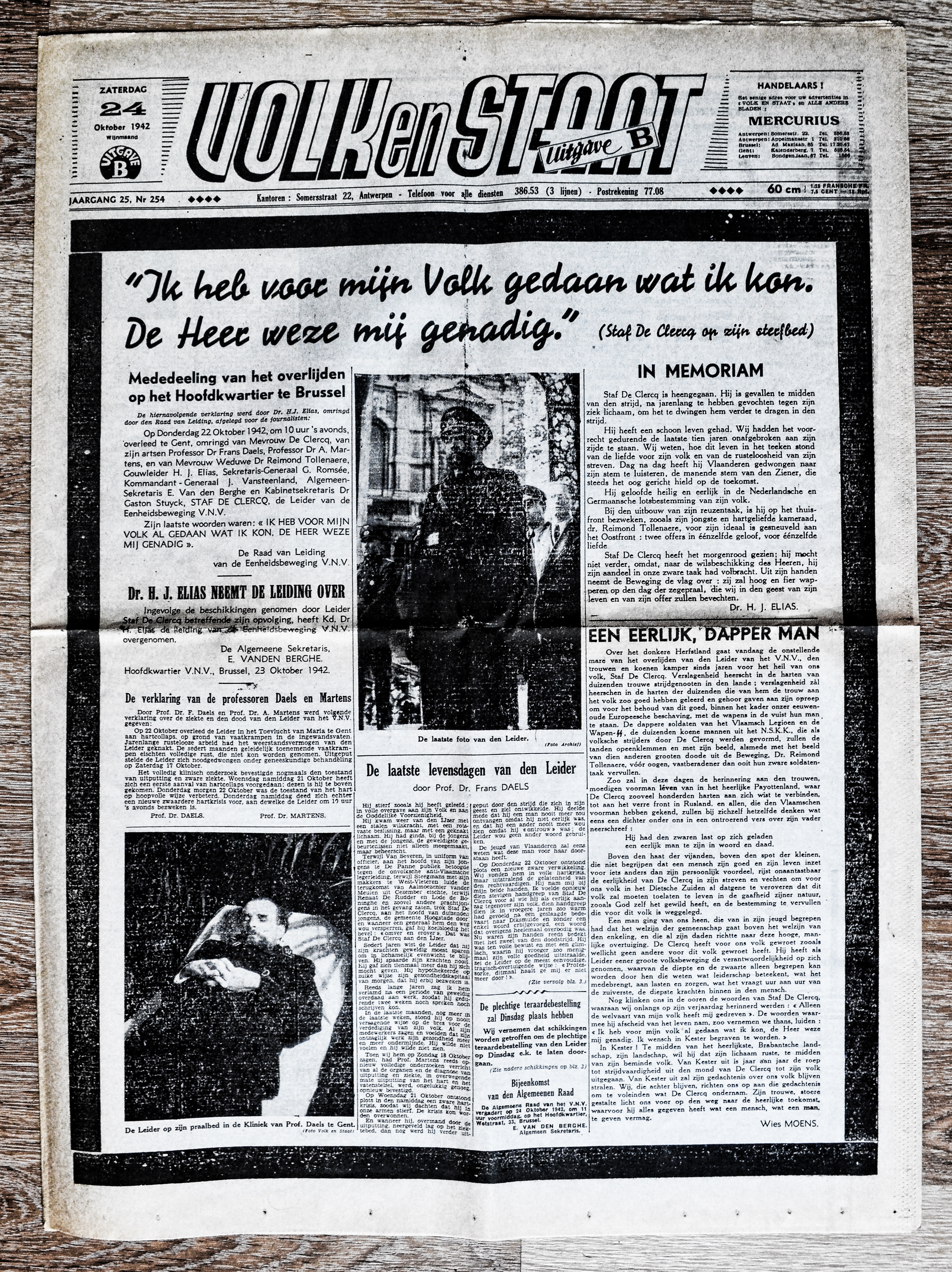
Volk en Staat's 24 October 1942 issue carrying a black mourning band for the death of the VNV leader Staf Declercq

Volk en Staat (Dutch; "People and State") was a Flemish daily newspaper between 1936 and 1944, linked to the Fascist Flemish National League (Vlaamsch Nationaal Verbond, VNV) party. It was founded on 15 November 1936 as a continuation of De Schelde.

It was banned shortly after the liberation of Belgium from German control in 1944.

Volk en Staat had a circulation which peaked at between 40,000 and 50,000 copies sold each day.
