= Ostend (Chamber of Representatives constituency) =

Former Belgian national legislative constituency

Ostend was a constituency used to elect members of the Belgian Chamber of Representatives between 1831 and 1900.

== Representatives ==
Election	Representative (Party)	Representative (Party)
1831	François Donny (Liberal)	1 seat
1833	François Donny (Liberal)	1 seat
1837	François Donny (Liberal)	1 seat
1841	François Donny (Liberal)	1 seat
1845	François Donny (Liberal)	1 seat
1848	Jean-Ignace Van Iseghem (Liberal)	1 seat
1852	Jean-Ignace Van Iseghem (Liberal)	1 seat
1856	Jean-Ignace Van Iseghem (Liberal)	1 seat
1857	Jean-Ignace Van Iseghem (Liberal)	1 seat
1861	Jean-Ignace Van Iseghem (Liberal)	1 seat
1864	Jean-Ignace Van Iseghem (Liberal)	1 seat
1868	Jean-Ignace Van Iseghem (Liberal)	1 seat
1870	Jean-Ignace Van Iseghem (Liberal)	1 seat
1874	Jean-Ignace Van Iseghem (Liberal)	1 seat
1878	Charles Janssens (Liberal)	1 seat
1882	Louis Carbon (Catholic)	1 seat
1886	Paul Carbon (Catholic)	1 seat
1890	Paul Carbon (Catholic)	1 seat
1892	Ferdinand de Stuers (Liberal)	Alphonse Pieters (Liberal)
1894	Auguste Hamman (Catholic)	Jules Vanderheyde (Catholic)
1898	Auguste Hamman (Catholic)	Jules Vanderheyde (Catholic)
1900	Merged into Veurne-Diksmuide-Ostend	
