= Diksmuide (Chamber of Representatives constituency) =

Belgian political subdivision

Diksmuide was a constituency used to elect a single member of the Belgian Chamber of Representatives between 1831 and 1900.

== Representatives ==
| Election | Representative (Party) |
|---|---|
| 1831 | Pierre Morel-Danheel (Catholic) |
| 1833 | Pierre Morel-Danheel (Catholic) |
| 1837 | Pierre Morel-Danheel (Catholic) |
| 1841 | Pierre Morel-Danheel (Catholic) |
| 1845 | Pierre De Breyne (Liberal) |
| 1848 | Pierre De Breyne (Liberal) |
| 1852 | Pierre De Breyne (Liberal) |
| 1856 | Pierre De Breyne (Liberal) |
| 1857 | Pierre De Breyne (Liberal) |
| 1861 | Charles de Coninck de Merckem (Catholic) |
| 1864 | Charles de Coninck de Merckem (Catholic) |
| 1868 | Gustave De Breyne (Liberal) |
| 1870 | Théophile de Lantsheere (Catholic) |
| 1874 | Théophile de Lantsheere (Catholic) |
| 1878 | Théophile de Lantsheere (Catholic) |
| 1882 | Théophile de Lantsheere (Catholic) |
| 1886 | Théophile de Lantsheere (Catholic) |
| 1890 | Théophile de Lantsheere (Catholic) |
| 1892 | Théophile de Lantsheere (Catholic) |
| 1894 | Théophile de Lantsheere (Catholic) |
| 1898 | Théophile de Lantsheere (Catholic) |
| 1900 | Merged into Veurne-Diksmuide-Ostend |
