= August Borms =

Flemish nationalist politician

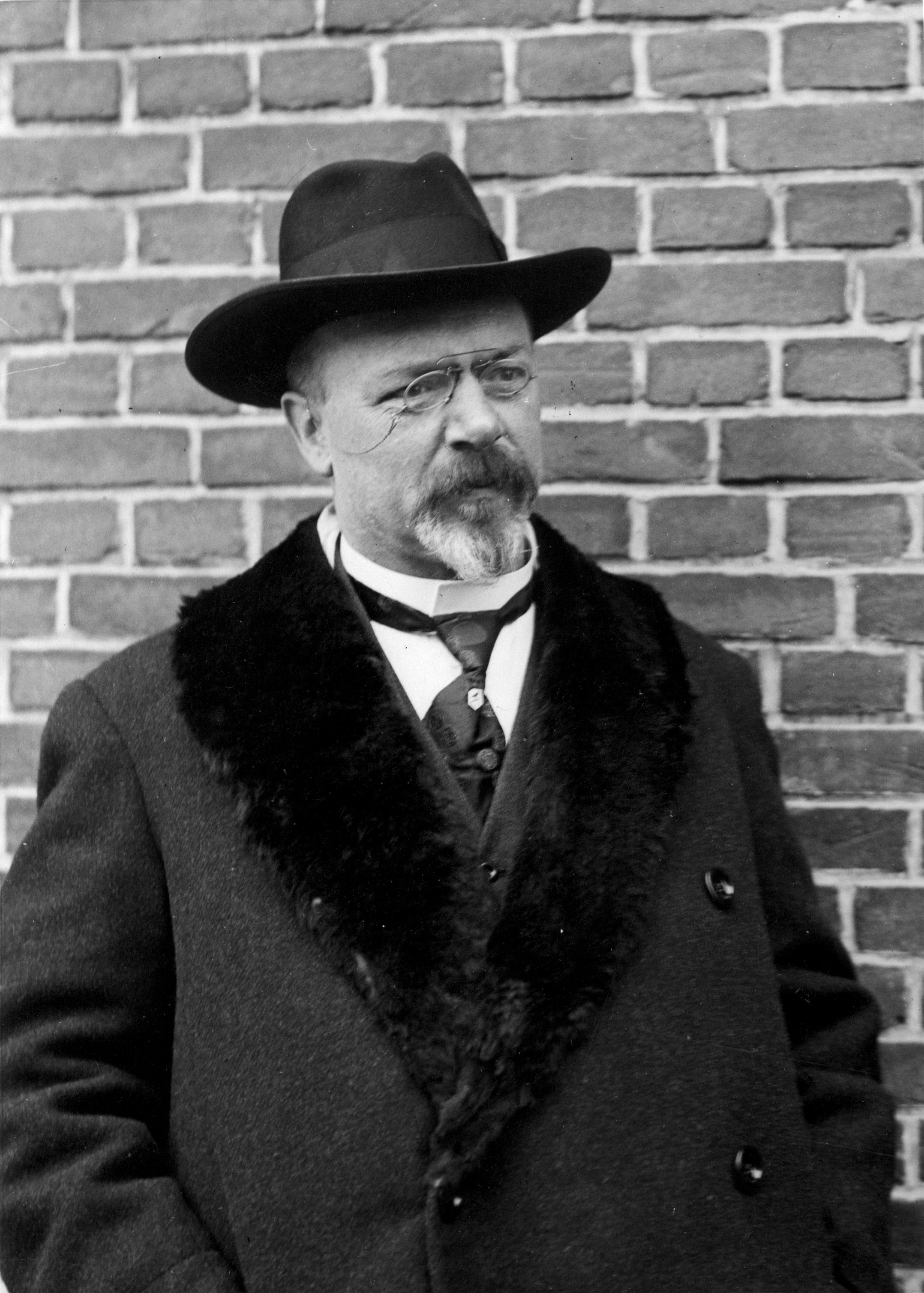
- Born: April 14, 1878; Sint-Niklaas, Belgium
- Died: April 12, 1946 (aged 67); Etterbeek, Belgium
- Cause of death: Execution by firing squad
- Occupations: Academic, politician
- Political party: Frontpartij
- Movement: Flemish Movement
- Status: Executed
- Conviction: Treason
- Penalty: Death

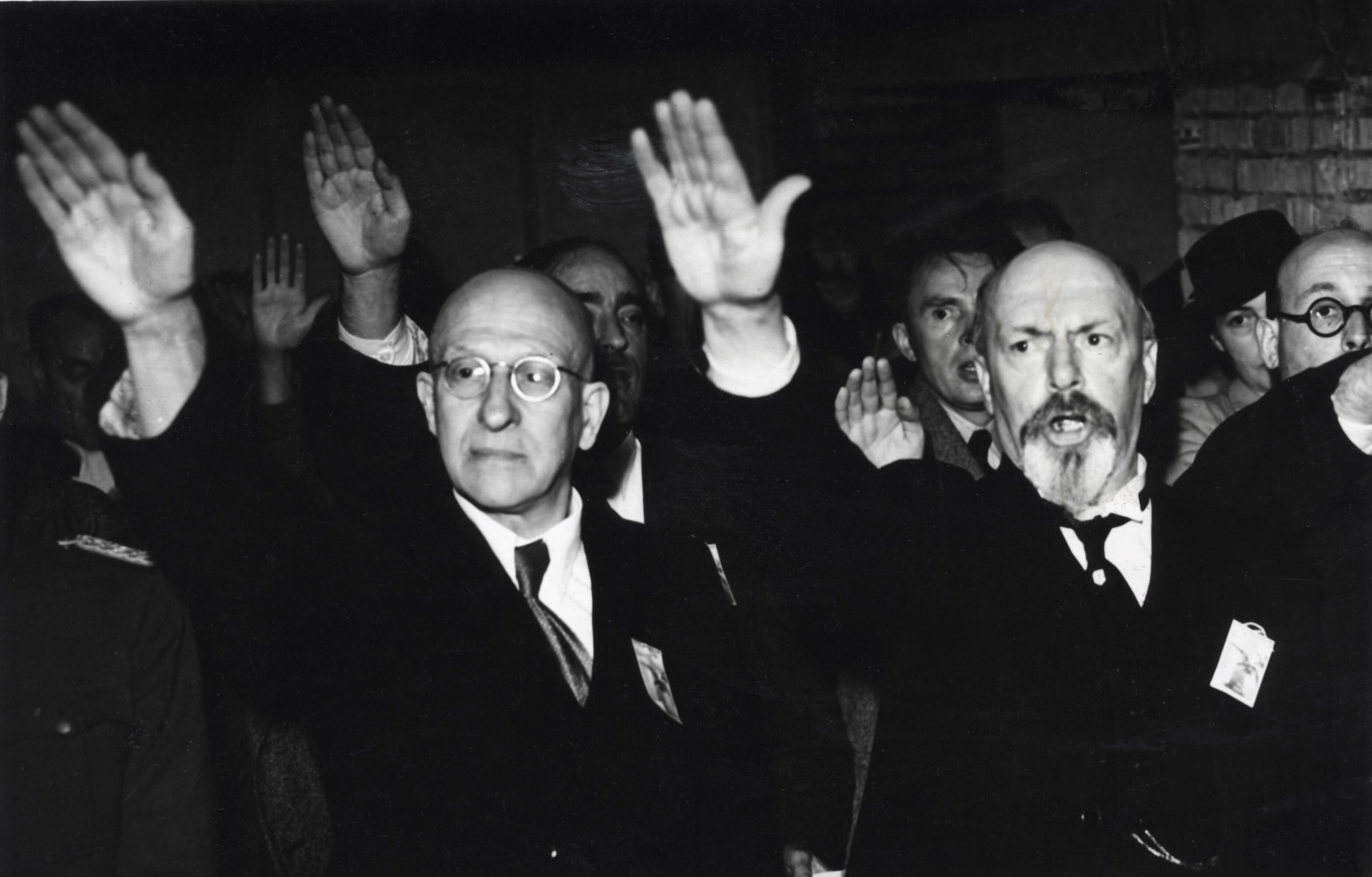
Frans Daels and Borms (right) giving the Nazi salute (22nd IJzerbedevaart, 24 August 1941)

August Borms (14 April 1878 – 12 April 1946) was a Flemish nationalist politician active in Belgium during the first half of the twentieth century. He belonged to the far-right of the Flemish movement. Borms collaborated with Germany during both the First and Second World Wars and was sentenced to death at the end of each conflict. He was not executed however until 1946, having had his sentence quashed the first time.

== First World War ==
Borms was a prominent figure in Antwerp and served as a professor at the Royal Lycee in the city. He was part of a Flemish delegation to Berlin in 1917 that sought to work with the Germans and was instrumental in the establishment of the Raad van Vlaanderen, a provisional assembly body that ratified collaboration with Germany by asking them to oversee the separation of Flemish government apparatus from that of Belgium. In 1918 this body declared the independence of Flanders with Borms as the leader of the new government. Although he collaborated closely with Germany, Borms did not support unity with that country, insisting that he was working with the Germans only to facilitate the establishment of a fully independent Flanders that would nonetheless be allied to Germany.

== Inter-war activity ==
Borms was initially sentenced to death for his collaboration with the Germans. After an intervention from a sympathetic cleric attached to the German Foreign Ministry, Papal nuncio Eugenio Pacelli (who later became pope as Pius XII) intervened in support of Borms, writing a letter to the Belgian authorities that presented the Flemish leader as an idealist and argued that his frequent visits to Germany during the war had been to see Flemish prisoners rather than to discuss collaboration. He added that Borms was a staunch Roman Catholic who had never attacked the church, something that should be taken into account by an avowedly Catholic country like Belgium. As a result of this and other campaigns his sentence was commuted to life imprisonment.

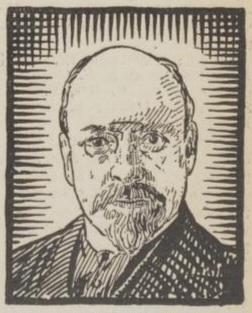
August Borms

Despite his imprisonment Borms continued to be active in Flemish politics and was instrumental in establishing the Front Movement and Frontpartij. Along with his close ally Cyriel Verschaeve he was the leader of a tendency within this group that saw future collaboration with Germany as the best way to fulfil Flemish ambitions. By 1926 Borms had been offered an early release from prison but he refused to accept it, as it included a clause barring him from political activity, and instead campaigned from jail for a general amnesty for prisoners held because of nationalist activism.

From his prison cell Borms won a by-election in Antwerp, defeating the Liberal Party candidate in a vote that was boycotted by both the Catholic Party and the Belgian Labour Party. The margin of his victory in the election, which was held on 9 December 1928, caused a stir as he won 83,053 votes to 44,410 for the Liberals' Paul Baelde and 58,052 spoiled ballots (as the Catholics and Labour had told their supporters to do). Baelde took the seat however as Borms' conviction de barred him from parliament. Nonetheless, on the back of this performance the Frontpartij enjoyed significant gains in the general election the following year. Borms was released from prison the same year.

== Second World War ==
He was once again involved in collaboration during the German occupation of Belgium. The Nazi military governor Alexander von Falkenhausen established a "Reparations Committee" to investigate alleged atrocities against First World War collaborators by the Belgian government and distribute compensation to them. Falkenhausen appointed Borms to chair this body and, after fourteen months of investigations, the body distributed some six million francs to the supposed victims, including a sizeable sum to Borms himself.

In 1943 he toured Germany and Central-Europe with his wife, visiting among others a forced labour camp in Berlin and Auschwitz.

After the war Borms was sentenced to death a second time for collaboration although this time he was to receive no clemency and was executed by firing squad in 1946.
