= Veurne-Diksmuide-Ostend-Ypres (Chamber of Representatives constituency) =

Belgian political subdivision

Veurne-Diksmuide-Ostend-Ypres was a constituency used to elect members of the Belgian Chamber of Representatives between 1995 and 2003.

== Representatives ==
Election	Representative (Party)	Representative (Party)	Representative (Party)	Representative (Party)	Representative (Party)
1995	Formed from a merger of Veurne-Diksmuide-Ostend and Ypres				
1995	Aimé Desimpel (VLD)	Ferdinand Ghesquière (CVP)	Johan Vande Lanotte (PS)	Martial Lahaye (VLD)	Yves Leterme (CVP)
1999	Frans Verhelst (VLD)	Koen Bultinck (VB)	Patrick Lansens (PS)	Martial Lahaye (VLD)	Yves Leterme (CVP)
