= Daniel Robberechts =

Flemish writer

Daniël Robberechts (8 May 1937 in Etterbeek – 27 May 1992 in Everbeek) was a Belgian writer.

== Bibliography ==
- De labiele stilte (1968)
- Tegen het personage (1968)
- De grote schaamlippen (1969)
- Aankomen in Avignon (1970); Arriving in Avignon, translated by Paul Vincent, Dalkey Archive Press, 2010.
- Materialen voor een eigentijdse praktijk van het schrijven, in Schrift, 12-28 (1972–1977)
- Praag schrijven (1975)
- Verwoordingen, in Het mes in het beeld (1976)
- Onderwerpen. Subjecten. Brokken. Verwoordingen (1978)
- Bezwarende geschriften 1967-1977 (1984)
- Dagboek '64-'65 (1984)
- Dagboek '66-'68 (1987)
- Nagelaten werk (1994)

== Awards ==
- 1964 - Arkprijs van het Vrije Woord

== See also ==
- Flemish literature

== Sources ==
- Daniel Robberechts
- G.J. van Bork en P.J. Verkruijsse, De Nederlandse en Vlaamse auteurs (1985)
- Fernand Auwera, ‘Daniël Robberechts’ In: Schrijven of schieten. Interviews (1969)
