= 1932 Belgian general election =

← 1929	27 November 1932	1936 →

All 187 seats in the Chamber of Representatives All 93 seats in the Senate
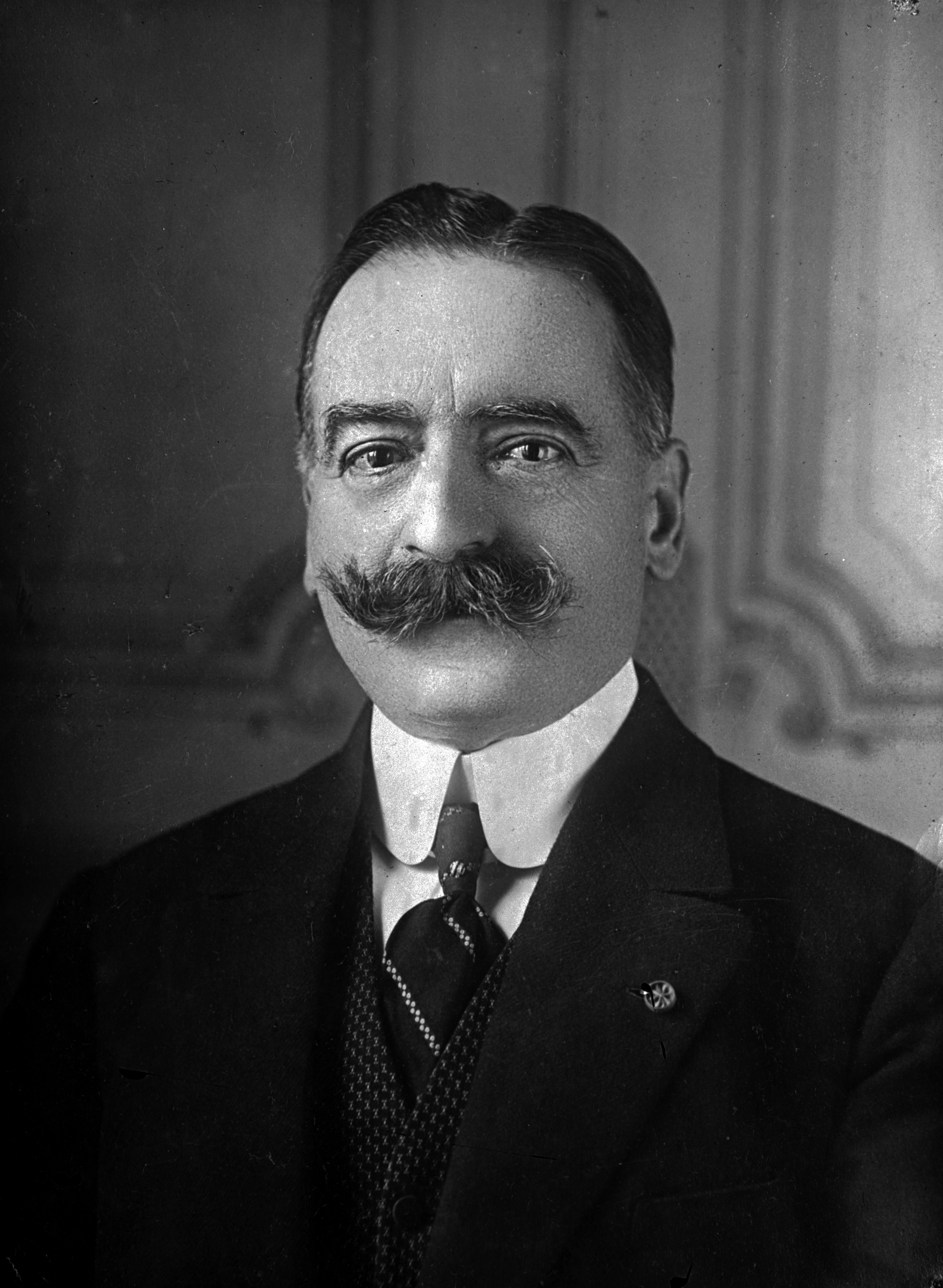

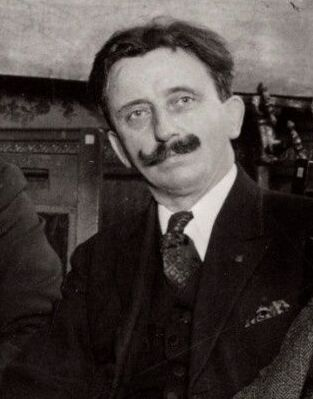

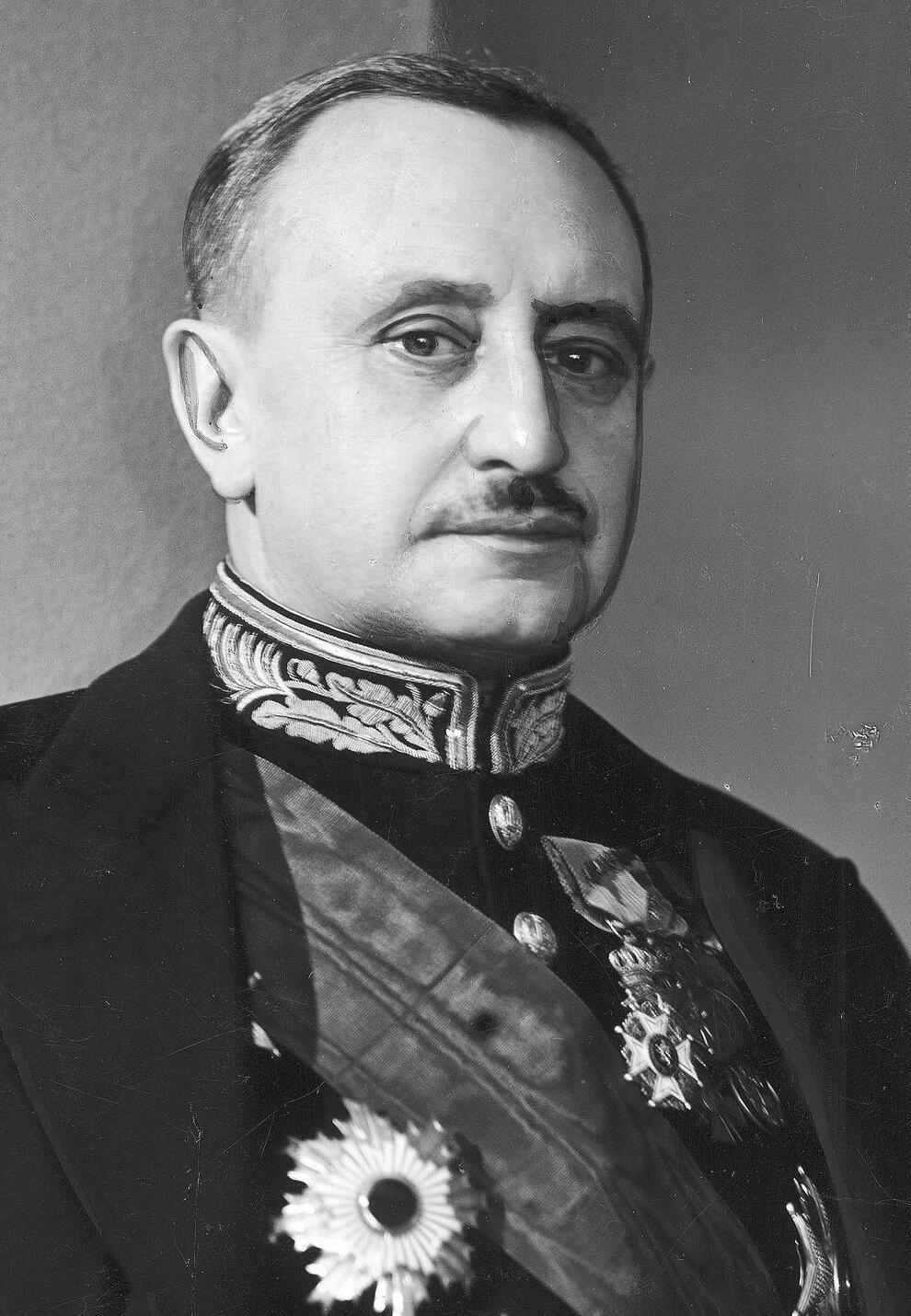
	First party	Second party	Third party
Leader	Charles de Broqueville	Joseph Van Roosbroeck	Albert Devèze
Party	Catholic	Labour	Liberal
Leader since	Candidate for PM	1918	1927
Last election	71 seats, 35.38%	70 seats, 36.02%	28 seats, 16.55%
Seats won	79	73	24
Seat change	▲8	▲3	▼4
Popular vote	856,027	824,946	313,722
Percentage	38.42%	37.03%	14.08%
Swing	▲3.04%	▲1.01%	▼2.47%
Government before election
de Broqueville II
Catholic-Liberal
Government after election
de Broqueville II
Catholic-Liberal

General elections were held in Belgium on 27 November 1932. The Catholic Party won 79 of the 187 seats in the Chamber of Representatives and 42 of the 93 seats in the Senate. Voter turnout was 94.3%.

== Background ==
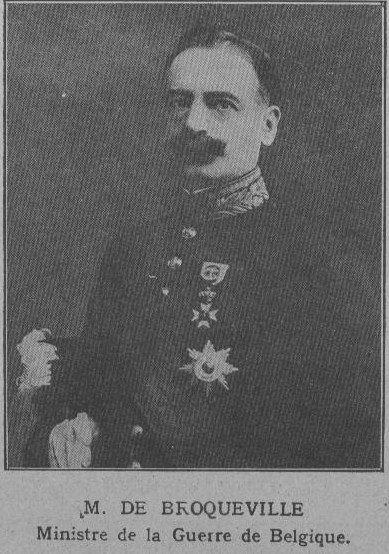
Prime Minister de Broqueville

The elections occurred during an economic crisis, the Great Depression. The Catholic-Liberal government led by Jules Renkin faced rising unemployment, derailing public finances and strikes benefiting the Communist Party. Parliamentary elections were due in May 1933 at the latest. On 18 October 1932, Prime Minister Renkin resigned under pressure from King Albert I, allowing the more experienced Charles de Broqueville to take charge. He immediately dissolved parliament and scheduled parliamentary elections for 27 November 1932.

Municipal elections had also occurred on 9 October 1932, where the Catholic Party lost ground to socialists and liberals. To avoid losses during the parliamentary elections, de Broqueville used the issue of education in the election campaign, which was a major issue under his previous 1911–1918 government.

His strategy worked; the Catholics won, but also the socialists and communists gained ground, whereas the liberals lost seats. The socialists refused to enter government, and the Catholic-Liberal coalition continued their government and proceeded to take drastic measures for economic recovery.

== Results ==
=== Chamber of Representatives ===
Party	Votes	%	Seats	+/–
Catholic Party	856,027	38.42	79	+8
Belgian Labour Party	824,946	37.03	73	+3
Liberal Party	313,722	14.08	24	–4
Frontpartij	126,113	5.66	8	–3
Communist Party of Belgium	64,552	2.90	3	+2
Belgian National Party	12,977	0.58	0	New
Christian People's Party	7,701	0.35	0	0
Catholic dissidents	4,664	0.21	0	New
Frontpartij dissidents	4,642	0.21	0	New
Farmers	4,294	0.19	0	New
Taxpayers Bloc	2,511	0.11	0	New
Socialist dissidents	1,831	0.08	0	New
Independent socialists	838	0.04	0	New
French Defence Party	789	0.04	0	New
Radical Socialists	590	0.03	0	0
Radical Party–Radical Socialists	380	0.02	0	New
National Radical Party–Radical Party	248	0.01	0	New
Independent Communists	211	0.01	0	New
Isolated Unemployed	206	0.01	0	New
Farmers and Business	184	0.01	0	New
General Interests	172	0.01	0	New
Public Salvation Committee	148	0.01	0	New
Stroobants	130	0.01	0	New
Total	2,227,876	100.00	187	0
Valid votes	2,227,876	98.30		
Invalid/blank votes	38,600	1.70		
Total votes	2,266,476	100.00		
Registered voters/turnout	2,555,743	88.68		
Source: Belgian Elections

=== Senate ===
Party	Votes	%	Seats	+/–
Catholic Party	893,290	39.05	42	+4
Belgian Labour Party	860,053	37.60	39	+3
Liberal Party	339,127	14.83	11	-2
Frontpartij	119,740	5.23	1	–2
Communist Party of Belgium	54,902	2.40	0	0
Christian People's Party	5,961	0.26	0	0
Belgian National Party	4,334	0.19	0	New
Farmers	2,194	0.10	0	New
Frontpartij dissidents	2,162	0.09	0	New
Socialist dissidents	2,043	0.09	0	New
Taxpayers Bloc	1,103	0.05	0	New
French Defence Party	881	0.04	0	New
National Cartel	875	0.04	0	New
Radical Socialists	526	0.02	0	0
National Radical Party–Radical Socialists	177	0.01	0	New
Total	2,287,368	100.00	93	0
Valid votes	2,287,368	95.61		
Invalid/blank votes	105,105	4.39		
Total votes	2,392,473	100.00		
Registered voters/turnout	2,555,743	93.61		
Source: Belgian Elections
