= 1925 Belgian general election =

← 1921	5 April 1925	1929 →

187 seats in the Chamber of Representatives 93 seats in the Senate
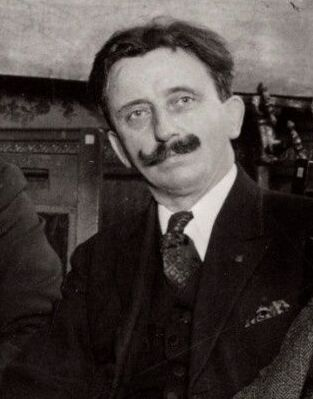

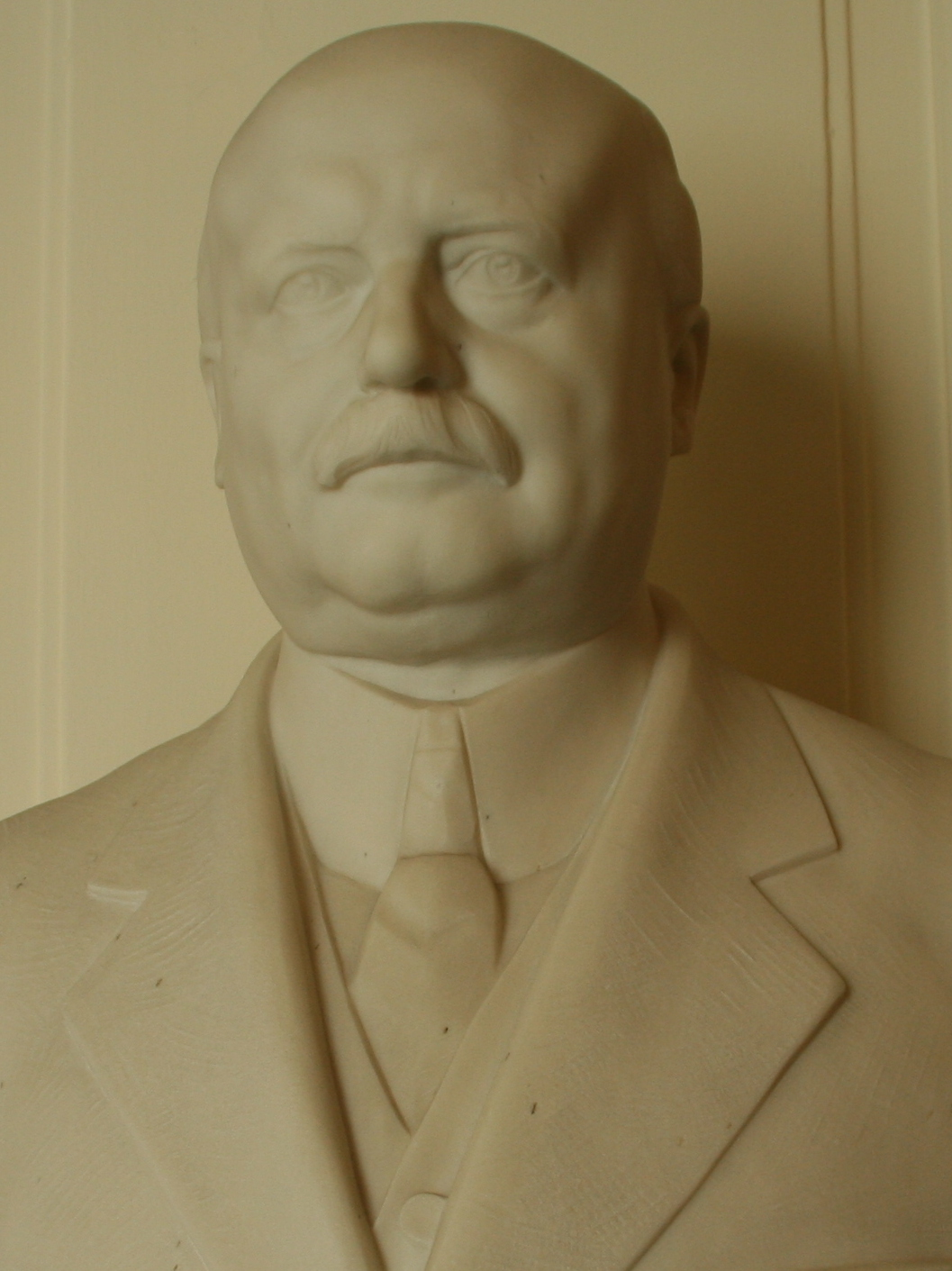

	First party	Second party	Third party
Leader	Joseph Van Roosbroeck	Aloys Van de Vyvere	Édouard Pecher
Party	Labour	Catholic	Liberal
Leader since	1918	Candidate for PM	1924
Last election	68 seats, 34.81%	70 seats, 34.02%	33 seats, 17.80%
Seats won	78	78	23
Seat change	▲10	▲8	▼10
Popular vote	821,116	778,366	304,757
Percentage	39.48%	37.42%	14.65%
Swing	▲4.47%	▲3.40%	▼3.15%
Government before election
Theunis I
Catholic-Liberal
Government after election
Van de Vyvere
Catholic

General elections were held in Belgium on 5 April 1925. The result was a victory for the Belgian Labour Party, which won 78 of the 187 seats in the Chamber of Representatives. Voter turnout was 92.8% in the Chamber election and 92.7% in the Senate election.

An extra seat in the Chamber of Representatives was assigned to the arrondissement of Verviers, after the annexation of Eupen-Malmedy.

Following the elections, Aloys Van de Vyvere formed a Catholic minority government. After he failed to receive the confidence of the other parties in parliament, a Catholic-Labour government was formed led by Prosper Poullet.

== Results ==
=== Chamber of Representatives ===
Party	Votes	%	Seats	+/–
Belgian Labour Party	821,116	39.46	78	+10
Catholic Party	778,366	37.41	78	0
Liberal Party	304,757	14.65	23	–10
Frontpartij	80,407	3.86	6	+2
Communist Party of Belgium	34,149	1.64	2	+2
Christian Workers' Alliance	19,642	0.94	0	0
Farmers	16,106	0.77	0	–
Middle Class Party	9,999	0.48	0	0
Christian Democrats	4,450	0.21	0	–
Legionnaires	4,005	0.19	0	–
Agricultural Unions	2,966	0.14	0	–
Radical Socialists	2,117	0.10	0	–
National Legion	919	0.04	0	–
Neutral	731	0.04	0	–
Walloon National Party	642	0.03	0	–
Independents	281	0.01	0	–
Total	2,080,653	100.00	187	+1
Registered voters/turnout	2,346,096	–		
Source: Nohlen & Stöver, Belgian Elections

=== Senate ===
Party	Votes	%	Seats	+/–
Belgian Labour Party	828,854	40.87	39	+6
Catholic Party	757,804	37.36	38	+4
Liberal Party	324,823	16.02	13	–5
Catholic dissidents	52,286	2.58	3	New
Frontpartij	46,417	2.29	0	0
Farmers	5,800	0.29	0	New
Middle Class Party	1,965	0.10	0	0
Radical Socialists	1,486	0.07	0	New
Catholic National Party	1,332	0.07	0	New
Walloon National Party	654	0.03	0	New
Independents	6,776	0.33	0	New
Total	2,028,197	100.00	93	0
Registered voters/turnout	2,346,096	–		
Source: Belgian Elections
