= Poppenbüll =

Poppenbüll Poppenbøl
- Municipality
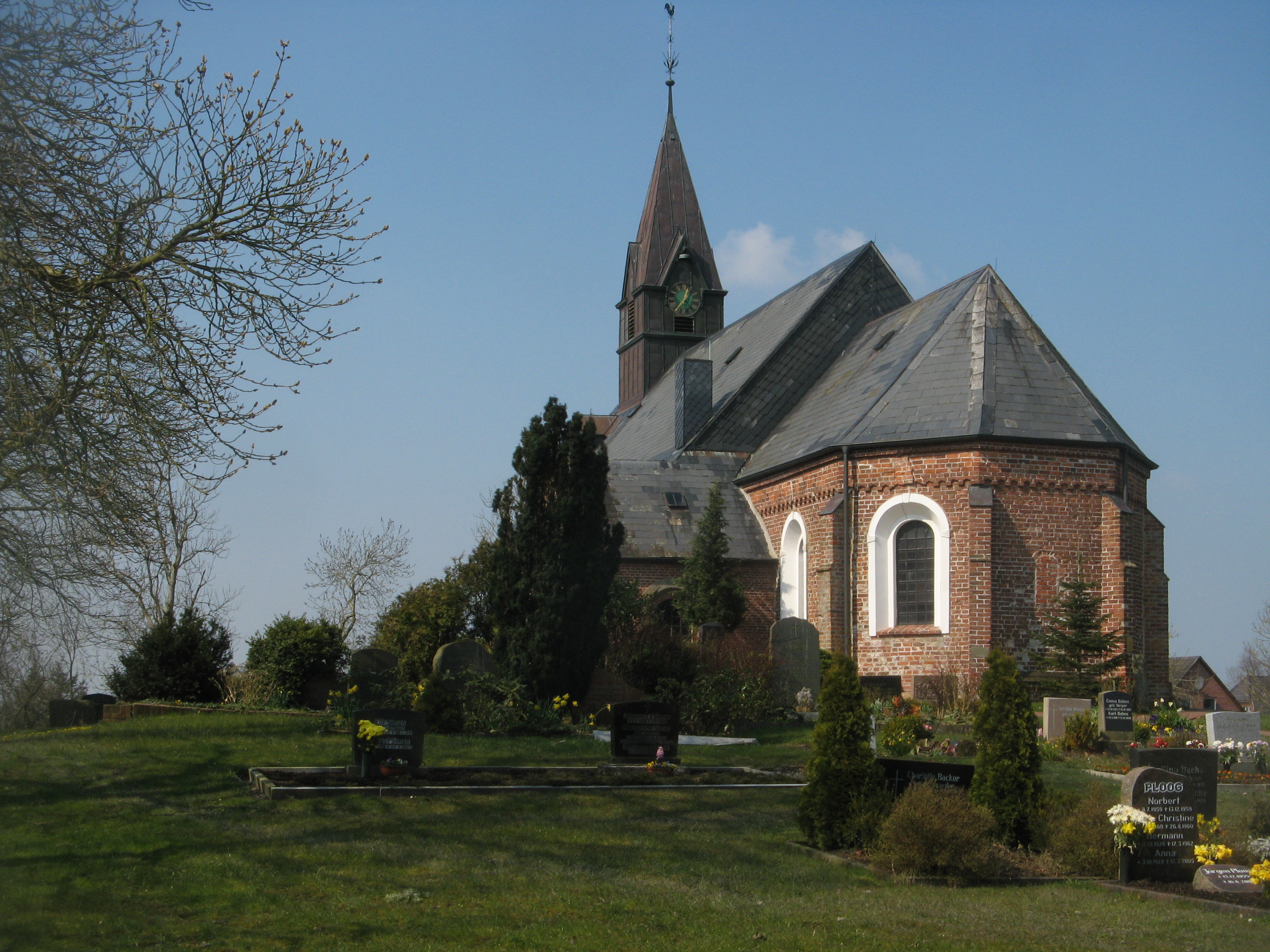
- St. John's church in Poppenbüll

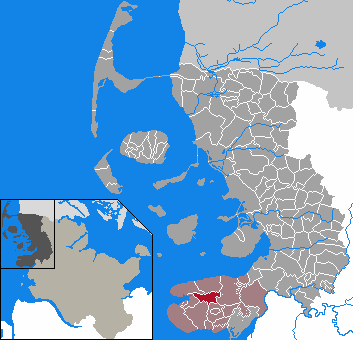
- Location of Poppenbüll; Poppenbøl within Nordfriesland district
- Interactive map of Poppenbüll; Poppenbøl
- Location within Germany Location within Schleswig-Holstein
- Coordinates: 54°22′9″N 8°45′41″E
- Country: Germany
- State: Schleswig-Holstein
- District: Nordfriesland

Government
  - Mayor: Wiebke Buschmann

Area
  - Total: 15.52 km^{2} (5.99 sq mi)
- Elevation: 3 m (9.8 ft)

Population (2025-12-31)
  - Total: 251
  - Density: 16.2/km^{2} (41.9/sq mi)
- Time zone: UTC+01:00 (CET)
  - Summer (DST): UTC+02:00 (CEST)
- Postal codes: 25836
- Dialling codes: 04862, 04865
- Vehicle registration: NF
- Website: www.amt-eiderstedt.de

Poppenbüll (Danish: Poppenbøl) is a municipality in the district of Nordfriesland, in Schleswig-Holstein, Germany.

== See also ==
- Eiderstedt peninsula
