= Staf De Clercq =

Belgian politician (1884–1942)

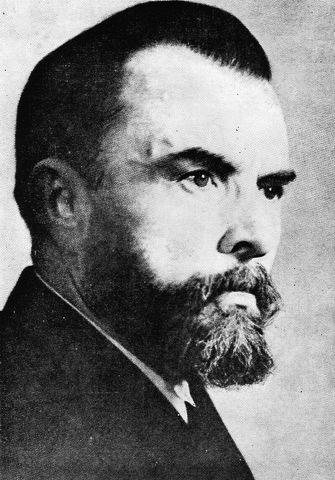
- Born: 16 September 1884; Everbeek, East Flanders, Belgium
- Died: 22 October 1942 (aged 58); Ghent, Belgium
- Occupation: politician

Staf De Clercq (16 September 1884 – 22 October 1942) was a Flemish nationalist collaborator, co-founder and leader of the Flemish nationalist Vlaamsch Nationaal Verbond (Flemish National League, or VNV).

== Biography ==
He was born as Jeroom Gustaaf De Clercq in Everbeek, East Flanders on 16 September 1884. He was a member of the moderate Frontpartij, became party leader in 1932, and moved them to the right, converting them into VNV the following year. In 1936 his new party gained 13.6% of the votes in Flanders, and 14.7% in 1939.

Welcoming of the Nazi German occupation, De Clercq believed it to constitute a chance for the creation of a Diets state, an unprecedented (apart from the medieval Burgundian personal union) Dutch language-based community uniting Flanders, the Netherlands and even the part of northern France with Flemish dialects (corresponding to French Flanders). His organization supported the German occupiers in the identification and round-up of Jews for deportation.

He died in Ghent and was succeeded by Hendrik Elias. In 1978 the Vlaamse Militanten Orde had his body transferred to the cemetery in Asse. He remains revered among some far-right Flemish nationalists in modern Belgium.
