= 1929 Belgian general election =

← 1925	26 May 1929	1932 →

All 187 seats in the Chamber of Representatives All 93 seats in the Senate
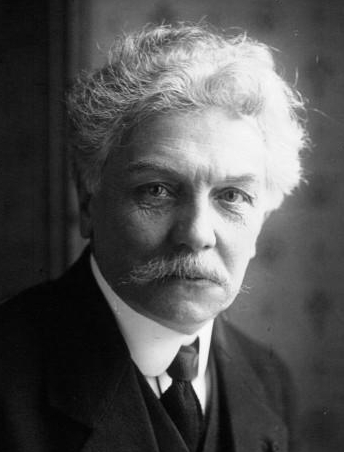

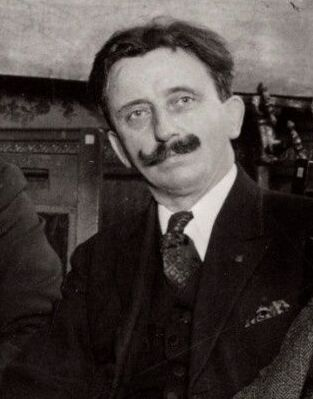

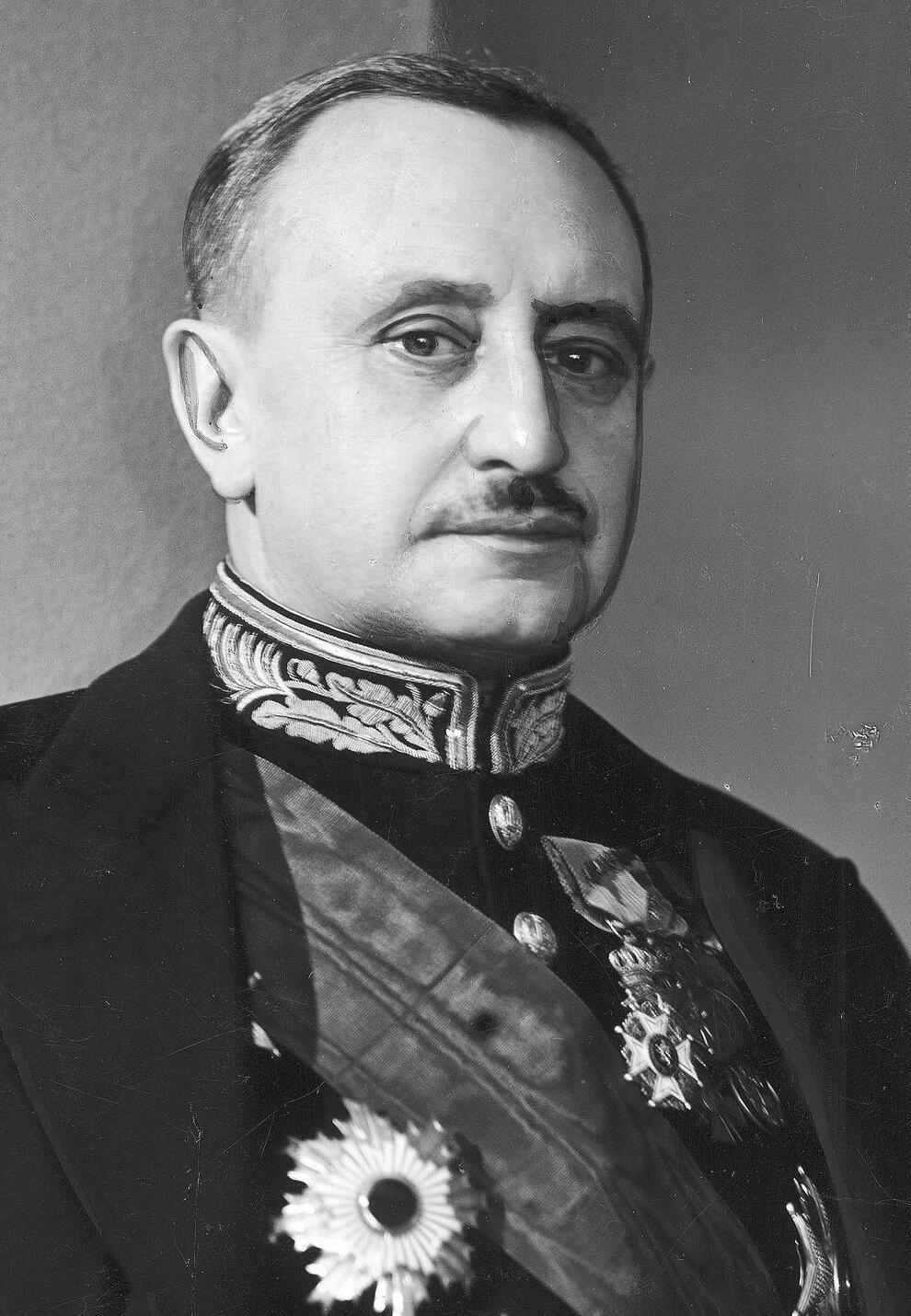
	First party	Second party	Third party
Leader	Henri Jaspar	Joseph Van Roosbroeck	Albert Devèze
Party	Catholic	Labour	Liberal
Leader since	Candidate for PM	1918	1927
Last election	78 seats, 37.42%	78 seats, 39.48%	23 seats, 14.65%
Seats won	71	70	28
Seat change	▼7	▼8	▲5
Popular vote	788,914	803,347	369,114
Percentage	35.38%	36.02%	16.55%
Swing	▼2.04%	▼3.46%	▲1.90%
Government before election
Jaspar II
Catholic–Liberal
Government after election
Jaspar II
Catholic–Liberal

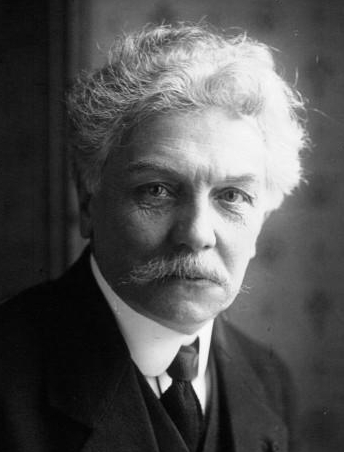
Prime Minister Henri Jaspar

General elections were held in Belgium on 26 May 1929. The result was a victory for the Catholic Party, which won 71 of the 187 seats in the Chamber of Representatives. Voter turnout was 94.0%.

The incumbent Catholic-Liberal government led by Henri Jaspar continued after the election.

== Results ==
=== Chamber of Representatives ===
Party	Votes	%	Seats	+/–
Belgian Labour Party	803,347	36.02	70	–8
Catholic Party	788,914	35.38	71	–7
Liberal Party	369,114	16.55	28	+5
Frontpartij	132,567	5.94	11	+5
Christian Workers' Alliance	52,642	2.36	5	+5
Communist Party of Belgium	43,237	1.94	1	–1
Lille List	12,905	0.58	1	New
Christian People's Party	8,049	0.36	0	New
Communist Opposition	6,190	0.28	0	New
Neutral	6,030	0.27	0	0
Walloon National Party	1,883	0.08	0	0
Middle Class Party	1,114	0.05	0	0
Leftist dissidents	1,047	0.05	0	New
Flemish Liberal Democrats	1,034	0.05	0	New
Martin List	954	0.04	0	New
Radical Socialists	402	0.02	0	0
Lambreghs List	366	0.02	0	New
Catholic Democratic Union	274	0.01	0	New
Total	2,230,069	100.00	187	0
Valid votes	2,230,069	95.03		
Invalid/blank votes	116,660	4.97		
Total votes	2,346,729	100.00		
Registered voters/turnout	2,497,446	93.97		
Source: Belgian Elections, Mackie & Rose

=== Senate ===
Party	Votes	%	Seats	+/–
Belgian Labour Party	781,635	36.75	36	–3
Catholic Party	762,459	35.85	38	0
Liberal Party	359,895	16.92	13	0
Frontpartij	119,632	5.62	3	+3
Christian Workers' Alliance	55,237	2.60	3	+3
Communist Party of Belgium	36,881	1.73	0	0
Christian People's Party	6,923	0.33	0	New
Walloon National Party	3,413	0.16	0	0
Radical Socialists	775	0.04	0	0
Total	2,126,850	100.00	93	0
Valid votes	2,126,850	92.81		
Invalid/blank votes	164,702	7.19		
Total votes	2,291,552	100.00		
Registered voters/turnout	2,439,060	93.95		
Source: Belgian Elections
