= René Lagrou =

Belian WWII Nazi collaborator and politician (1904–1969)

- Born: 15 April 1904; Blankenberge, West Flanders, Belgium
- Died: 1 April 1969 (aged 64); Barcelona, Spain
- Other name: Reinaldo van Groede
- Occupations: Lawyer, immigration officer
- Employer: División de Informaciones
- Known for: Politician, founder of the Algemeene-SS Vlaanderen
- Political party: Flemish National Union

René Lagrou (15 April 1904 – 1 April 1969) was a Belgian politician and collaborator with Nazi Germany.

== Pre-occupation ==
Lagrou was born in Blankenberge in West Flanders, Belgium, and worked as a lawyer in Antwerp. Lagrou first came to prominence as a member of the Flemish National Union. He published his own journal Roeland, which became increasingly anti-Semitic following Adolf Hitler's rise to power.

== German occupation, and capture ==
Following the German occupation of Belgium in World War II Lagrou, along with Ward Hermans, founded the extremist Algemeene-SS Vlaanderen (from 1942, the Germaansche SS in Vlaanderen), a Flemish political faction supported by the SS.

Lagrou saw action with the Waffen SS on the Eastern Front and some initial reports erroneously suggested that he had died in battle. However Lagrou survived and was captured by the Allies in France but managed to escape to Francoist Spain.

== In exile, ratlines, and death ==
In May 1946 his was one of three names on a 'black list' sent by the government of Belgium to Spain where he was in hiding, along with Léon Degrelle and Pierre Daye. Soon after he was condemned to death in absentia by the war crimes tribunal in Antwerp. With the possibility of extradition from Spain looming, Lagrou arrived in Argentina in July 1947 and adopted the false name Reinaldo van Groede. Here he became a leading figure in the ratlines sponsored by Juan Perón to rescue Nazis from prosecution in Europe. Given wide powers within the immigration service in Argentina, Lagrou drew up ambitious plans to move as many as 2 million people from Belgium, all either Nazi collaborators or their families. He was also a member of the Rodolfo Freude-led División de Informaciones and in this capacity initiated the cases for resettlement for a number of Nazis.

Lagrou died from cancer in Barcelona, Spain on 1 April 1969.
