= Vlaamsch Nationaal Verbond =

Flemish National Union Vlaamsch Nationaal Verbond
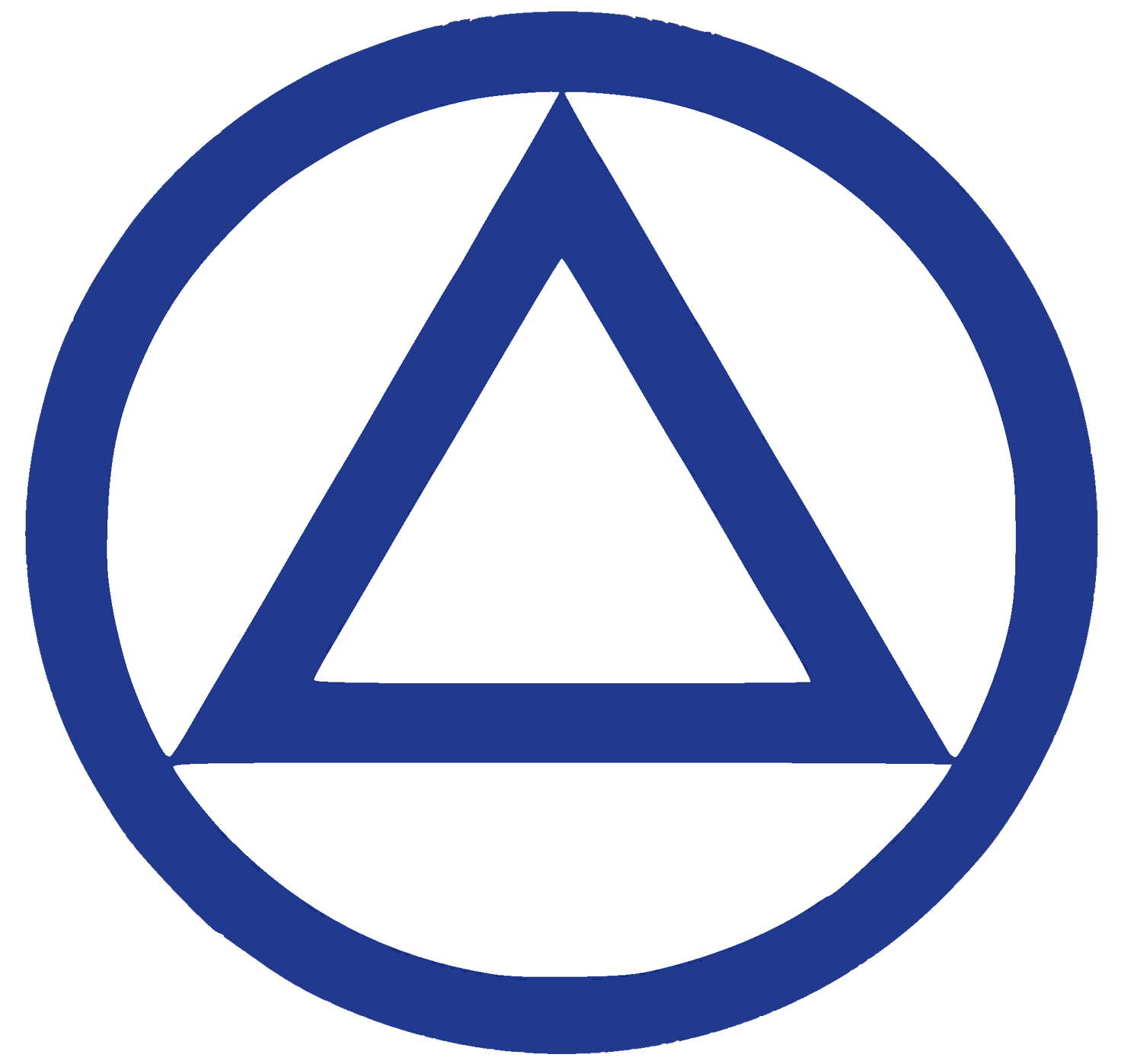
- Leader: Staf De Clercq (until 1942); Hendrik Elias (from 1942)
- Founded: 8 October 1933
- Dissolved: 2 September 1944
- Preceded by: Frontpartij
- Headquarters: Brussels, Belgium
- Newspaper: Volk en Staat
- Youth wing: Nationaal-Socialistische Jeugd in Vlaanderen
- Paramilitary wing: Diets Militia—Black Brigades
- Membership: 25,000 (1939 est.)
- Ideology: Fascism; Flemish nationalism Greater Netherlands; Corporate statism
- Political position: Far-right
- French-speaking counterpart: Rexist Party (1936–1937)
- Slogan: "Authority, discipline, and Dietsland"
- Anthem: De Zwarte Leeuw (lit. 'The Black Lion') full song

Party flag

The Vlaamsch Nationaal Verbond (Dutch pronunciation: [ˈvlaːms nɑ(t)ɕoːˈnaːl vɛrˈbɔnt], "Flemish National Union" or "Flemish National League"), widely known by its initialism VNV, was a Flemish nationalist political party active in Belgium between 1933 and 1945. It became the leading force of political collaboration in Flanders during the German occupation of Belgium in World War II. Authoritarian by inclination, the party advocated the creation of a "Greater Netherlands" (Dietsland) combining Flanders and the Netherlands.

== Origins ==
The Vlaamsch Nationaal Verbond (VNV) was founded on 8 October 1933. Its origins were in the long-established Frontpartij, a moderate Flemish patriotic party which was taken over by Staf Declercq and moved to the right in 1932. From the start, the VNV was authoritarian and anti-democratic, being influenced by fascist ideas from elsewhere in Europe. However, it initially included both moderate and radical wings. It was not a genuinely fascist organisation per se. Ideologically, the party rejected Belgium and supported the creation of a new polity known as the Greater Netherlands (Dietsland), through the fusion of Belgian Flanders and the Netherlands, which would be linguistically and ethnically homogeneous. The party's slogan was: "Authority, discipline, Dietsland".

It shared many ideological elements with Verdinaso, a rival party founded two years earlier but slightly less radical. Unlike Verdinaso, the VNV took part in elections and included a relatively moderate wing. Initially, it also differed from Verdinaso in not being an antisemitic movement. Still, it increasingly embraced antisemitic elements after 1935, out of political calculation rather than ideological conviction.

In the 1936 Belgian general election, the VNV received 13.6% of the Flemish vote, corresponding to 7.1% nationwide. After the election, in which the far-right nationalist and Catholic Rexist Party also performed strongly, the two parties concluded an alliance intended to create a corporatist Belgian state with great autonomy for Flanders. The VNV revoked this agreement after just one year. In the 1939 elections, the VNV moderately increased its share of the Flemish vote to 15% (8.4% nationally) while the Rexist vote collapsed.

Despite cooperating with the Flemish section of the mainstream centre-right Catholic Party on the local level, De Clercq realised that his movement would not be able to take power by democratic means. Instead, he contacted Nazi Germany, hoping his project could be realised with German help. He contacted the Abwehr, Germany's military intelligence service, informing them that a part of the Belgian military supported his movement and could be controlled by him if Germany declared war. The Belgian state security gained knowledge of these contacts and arrested some VNV supporters.

== Collaboration ==
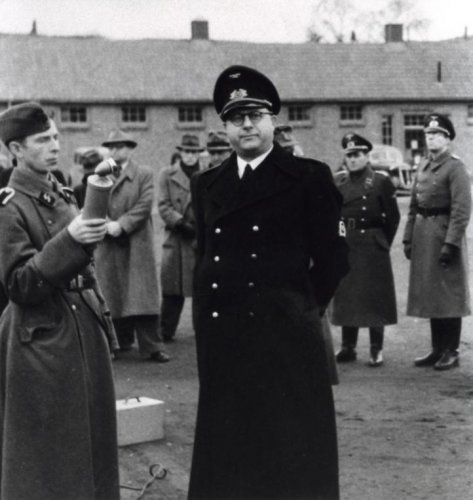
Hendrik Elias who led the VNV after Staf Declercq's death, pictured in 1942

When Nazi Germany invaded Belgium in 1940, De Clercq immediately chose to orient the VNV towards collaborationism, despite his previous declarations that he would not do so. Adolf Hitler did not install a civilian government (as in the Netherlands), but instead installed a military administration headed by General Alexander von Falkenhausen of the Wehrmacht. This, along with the departure of Ward Hermans and René Lagrou to form the Algemeene-SS Vlaanderen, led the VNV out of focus, forcing it to intensify its collaboration to gain influence. Hitler and SS leader Heinrich Himmler profited from the situation and increased competition between various groups by founding some more extreme collaborationist groups like the 6th SS Volunteer Sturmbrigade Langemarck and DeVlag ("German-Flemish Working Group"). Nevertheless, VNV politicians were given the mayor's office in several Flemish towns. VNV-led local administrations participated in the organisation of the deportation of Belgian Jews to Eastern Europe as part of the Holocaust in Belgium. They willingly implemented Nazi policies like the obligation of Jews to wear the yellow badge. VNV activists led in the Antwerp pogrom of April 1941.

Declercq died suddenly in October 1942 and was succeeded by Hendrik Elias, a member of the more moderate side. Elias continued collaborating with the Nazis but tried to come to terms with the military government to prevent the installation of a civilian government composed of Nazis. Elias failed, as Hitler installed the new body and declared the annexation of Flanders by Germany in 1944; seven weeks later, Belgium was liberated by the Allies. The VNV was outlawed after the liberation of Belgium. Elias fled to Germany but was tried after the war and imprisoned until 1959.

== Electoral performance ==
Election	Votes		Seats		Position	Government
Election	#	%	#	±	Position	Government
1936	166,737	7.06	16 / 202	▲16	▲5th	
1939	164,253	8.40	17 / 202	▲1	▲4th	
