= Frontpartij =

- Founder: Adiel Debeuckelaere
- Founded: 1919; 107 years ago
- Dissolved: 1933; 93 years ago
- Preceded by: Frontbeweging; Vlaamsche Front
- Succeeded by: Flemish National Union
- Newspaper: De Schelde
- Ideology: Flemish Movement; Autonomy; Socialism (early); Fascism (later)
- Political position: Initially Left-wing, later Far-right
- Religion: Roman Catholic Church

The Frontpartij (Dutch pronunciation: [ˈfrɔntpɑrˌtɛi], "Front Party") was a Belgian political party associated with the Flemish Movement. It was active between 1919 and 1934.

Originating in the Frontbeweging ([ˈfrɔndbəˌʋeːɣɪŋ], "Front movement") within the Belgian Army during World War I, the Frontpartij was broadly left-wing and achieved popularity with a localised following, particularly in Ghent. It advocated reforms to improve the status of the Dutch language within Flanders and in national institutions like the military. In contrast to some of its successor movements the party supported democracy and autonomy rather than authoritarianism and Flemish independence.

== Origins ==
The group had its origins amongst Dutch-speaking soldiers in the Belgian Army during the First World War who resented the fact that French was the only language of command. Taking the slogan "All for Flanders - Flanders for Christ," it attempted to organise within the army in support of equal language rights. Whilst the group was not anti-Belgian, it scared the generals, who suppressed it.

By summer 1917, the group had re-emerged in secret and, organised by Corporal Adiel Debeuckelaere, this new version, known as the Frontbeweging, set up a structure of representatives and committees across the army. With de Beuckelaere, a Ghent schoolteacher, and other leaders such as Joris Van Severen coming from an intellectual background they attempted to articulate their demands by sending a letter to King Albert calling for a separate Flemish Army and self-government for Flanders within Belgium. However the response of high command was to repress the Frontbeweging more forcefully than before.

The sudden collapse of the German Imperial Army in mid-1918 meant that the Belgian army experienced a rapid advance during the Hundred Days Offensive, leading to confusion and a lack of communication between Frontbeweging members. However, whilst the group's aims had not been met, it reconstituted after the November armistice under the name Vlaamsche Front.

== Political party ==
The movement was soon formalised as a political party, adopting the name Frontpartij and continuing its campaigns for army segregation and internal self-government, as well as adding policies such as Dutch language teaching in schools and Ghent University. The party had a strong Roman Catholic identity and, whilst most of its leaders were from the urban areas of Ghent and Leuven, it developed a strong following amongst small farmers, many of whom resented the Francophone large landowners. Its ideology was vague although generally identified as left-wing and within its ranks adherents of both socialism and communism were to be found.

The 6.3% of the vote captured in the 1919 election saw the Frontpartij with five members elected to the Belgian Chamber of Representatives, including a young Staf De Clercq. Support had in part been gained as a reaction to what was seen as the harsh treatment meted out to those Flemings that had collaborated with Germany, with the sentence of death passed on August Borms (albeit not carried out) and numerous life sentences for lesser collaborators attracting condemnation in Flanders.

The party's vote fell in the 1921 election although it was here that Van Severen was first elected to Parliament. The loss of support proved to be a temporary set-back however as they took 25,000 votes and six seats in 1925 before following this with 132,000 votes and 11 seats in 1929. In between, August Borms had even been elected to Parliament for the party in a 1928 by-election.

== Splits and refoundation ==
Van Severen lost his seat in the latter election, however, and removed from the centre of the party and having become a disciple of Charles Maurras and admirer of Benito Mussolini, he set up his own journal, Jong Dietschland which argued for the establishment of an independent 'Greater Netherlands' in which Dutch people, Flemings and Frisians would unite in this "Dietsch" state. The plan won support amongst the students of Ghent but the war veterans that made up much of the membership of the Frontpartij were unimpressed and the party organ De Schelde specifically condemned fascism. The result of this clash was a split in the Frontpartij with the foundation of Verdinaso in October 1931 as a far right group supporting the Dietsch option. Later on the movement shifted to Pan-Netherlandism, including Wallonia and Luxembourg into the proposed Dietsch state.

The Frontpartij lost a lot of support and three seats in the 1932 election and following this failure and the emergence of Verdinaso the remaining right wingers within the Frontpartij came to exercise more influence. Under the leadership of Staf de Clerq the party lurched to the right and in 1933 the party was discontinued altogether when de Clerq formed the Flemish National Union (VNV), an authoritarian rightist party. VNV absorbed the Frontpartij entirely as well as a number of smaller nationalist movements and emerged as the leading voice of Flemish nationalism in the 1930s.
