= Burkle =

Burkle, Bürkle or Buerkle (English: /ˈbɜːrkəl/ BUR-kəl) may refer to

- Burkle addressing system of assigning road names and addresses over a large, rural area
- Burkle Estate in Memphis, U.S.
- Winifred Burkle, fictional character on the American TV series Angel
- Burkle (surname)

== See also ==
- Burkel
