= Burkel =

Burkel or Bürkel is a Germanic surname that may refer to

- Dietrich Bürkel (1905–1986), German politician
- Heinrich Bürkel (1802–1869), German genre and landscape painter
- Victor van Strydonck de Burkel (1876–1961), Belgian general
  - Charge of Burkel, a skirmish between Belgian and German forces on 19 October 1918, during World War I
