= Auguste Gilliaert =

Belgian Army general

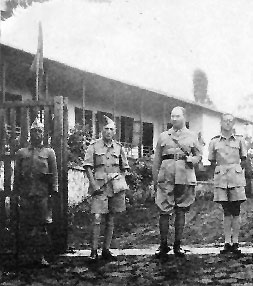
- Auguste Gilliaert (second from right) with Force Publique personnel in Italian East Africa, 1941
- Born: 7 March 1894; Sint-Pieters-op-den-Dijk (Bruges), Belgium
- Died: 10 May 1973 (aged 79); Belgium
- Military career
- Allegiance: Belgium; Belgian Congo
- Branch: Belgian Army (1910–16; 1919–37; 1954–55); Force Publique (1916–19; 1937–54)
- Service years: 1910–55
- Rank: Lieutenant general
- Commands: Force Publique
- Conflicts: World War I; German invasion of Belgium; Yser Front; East African campaign; World War II; East African campaign; Siege of Saïo

Auguste-Édouard Gilliaert (7 March 1894 – 10 May 1973) was a Belgian colonial lieutenant general who served in both world wars, and a commander of the Force Publique in the Belgian Congo.

== Career ==
=== Early life and World War I ===
After joining the Belgian Army in 1910, Gilliaert received an officer's commission in July 1914. With the outbreak of World War I, he fought in battles along the Yser River, near Ostende. In 1916, he volunteered for service in Central Africa, in what was then the Belgian Congo, and took part as a captain in the East Africa Campaign fighting in German East Africa. Gilliaert returned to Belgium in 1919, commanding units at home and in occupied Germany.

=== World War II ===
By World War II, Major-General Gilliaert was the commander of the "Belgian Expeditionary Forces" in East Africa during the East African Campaign of World War II. The Belgian Expeditionary Force was a Free Belgian colonial unit composed of troops from the Belgian Congo. In July 1941, Gilliaert cut off the retreat of Italian General Pietro Gazzera in Ethiopia and accepted the surrender of Gazzera's 7,000 troops.

After the successful conclusion of the campaign in East Africa, a part of the Force Publique was re-designated the 1st Belgian Congo Brigade Group and served in a garrison and rear-area security role in Cairo, Egypt and in British Palestine from 1943 to 1944. Gilliaert commanded the road march of the 2,000 man brigade on a journey of some 7,000 kilometers from Lagos to Cairo without losing a single man. Gilliaert was made commander of the Force Publique in July 1944 and promoted to lieutenant-general in October 1951.

Gilliaert returned to Belgium in March 1954 and retired on 1 April 1955.

== Command history ==
- General Officer Commanding, Belgian Expeditionary Forces East Africa – 1941
- Commander of the Force Publique – 1944

== Awards ==
- Commander of the Order of the African Star with Palm
- Honorary Commander of the Order of the British Empire
