= K193 =

K193 or K-193 may refer to:

- K-193 (Kansas highway), a state highway in Kansas
- HMS Buttercup (K193), a former UK Royal Navy ship
