= Saio =

Saio may refer to:

- Saiō, an unmarried female relative of the Japanese emperor
- Saïo, a town in Ethiopia
- Siege of Saïo, or battle of Saïo, took place during the East African Campaign of World War II
