= Siege of Saïo =

1941 Battle in East Africa during WWII

- Part of the East African campaign of the Second World War
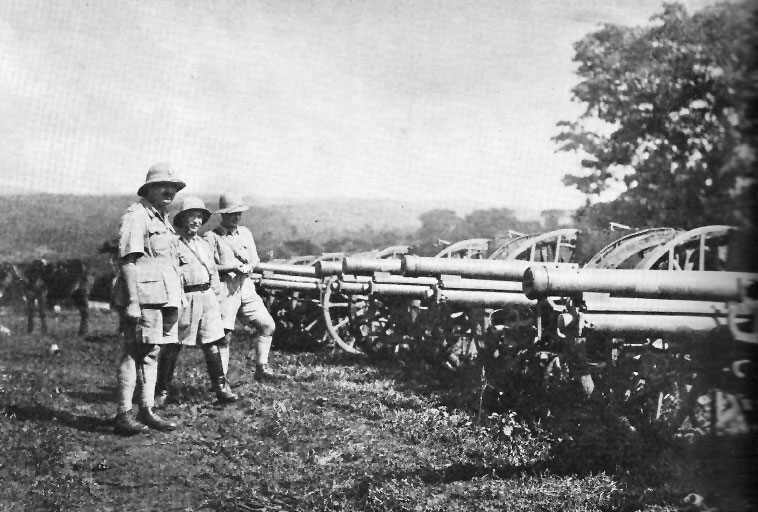
- Belgian officers with captured Italian artillery, following the battle
Date	25 March – 6 July 1941
Location	Saïo Plateau, Italian East Africa 08.53°N 34.80°E
Result	Allied victory
Territorial changes	Galla-Sidamo Governorate liberated by Allied forces

Belligerents
Belgium; British Empire; Ethiopian Empire; South Africa	Italy

Commanders and leaders
(Belgium) Auguste Gilliaert; (Belgium) L. Dronkers-Martens; (Belgium) Edmond van der Meersch; (United Kingdom) J. W. E. Mackenzie	(Kingdom of Italy) Pietro Gazzera (POW); (Kingdom of Italy) Carlo De Simone (POW)

Strength
Belgium: c. 3,000 troops; 2,000 porters; British Empire: 1 battalion; Ethiopian Empire: Unknown number of resistance fighters; South Africa: 3 aircraft	7,000–8,000 troops; aircraft

Casualties and losses
Belgium: 462 dead	c. 1,200 dead; 6,454 captured
- Location within Ethiopia

The siege of Saïo or battle of Saïo took place during the East African Campaign of World War II. Belgo-Congolese troops, British Commonwealth forces and local resistance fighters besieged the fort at the market town of Saïo in south-western Ethiopia in 1941. The siege lasted for several months, culminating in an Allied attack on the Italian garrison thereby forcing it to surrender.

In the first months of 1941, British and Belgian colonial forces attacked Italian East Africa from the colony of Anglo-Egyptian Sudan. By the end of March, they had seized the town of Gambela and begun containing retreating Italian forces, which were massing on a plateau in the mountain town of Saïo (presently Dembidolo) under the command of General Carlo De Simone and later General Pietro Gazzera. The British forces withdrew the following month (to start an offensive in Western Ethiopia) and the Belgians advanced down the road to Saïo. The Italians repelled them and they were forced to hold their positions along a nearby brook. Almost no fighting took place in May as heavy rain bogged down the Belgians and turned their supply line from Sudan into mud, creating a food shortage. In early June, reinforcements arrived via river and the Belgians besieged the Italian supply depot at Mogi. Aggressive patrols, combined with the actions of the Ethiopian resistance and raids from the South African Air Force put increased pressure upon the Italian garrison.

At the end of the month General Auguste Gilliaert took charge of the Belgian force. He was instructed by the British to attack when an opportunity presented itself. On 3 July, he assaulted the base of Saïo Mountain and in the afternoon Gazzera sued for peace. On 6 July, the Belgians formally accepted the surrender of Gazzera, eight of his generals and over 6,000 Italian soldiers.

== Background ==
=== Africa Orientale Italiana ===
On 9 May 1936, the Italian dictator Benito Mussolini proclaimed the colony of Africa Orientale Italiana (AOI, Italian East Africa), formed from Ethiopia (after the Italian victory in the Second Italo-Ethiopian War, fought 3 October 1935 – May 1936) and the existing Italian possessions of Italian Eritrea and Italian Somaliland. On 10 June 1940, Mussolini declared war on Britain and France, which made Italian military forces in Libya a threat to Egypt and those in Italian East Africa a danger to the British and French colonies in East Africa. Italian belligerence also closed the Mediterranean to Allied merchant ships and endangered British supply routes along the coast of East Africa, the Gulf of Aden, Red Sea and the Suez Canal. (Note: The Kingdom of Egypt remained neutral during World War II but the Anglo-Egyptian Treaty of 1936 allowed the British to occupy Egypt and Anglo-Egyptian Sudan.) Egypt, the Suez Canal, French Somaliland and British Somaliland were also vulnerable to an attack from Italian East Africa but the rearmament plans of the Comando Supremo (Italian General Staff) were not due to mature until 1942; in 1940 the Italian armed forces were not ready for military operations against a comparable power.

== Prelude ==
=== Regio Esercito ===
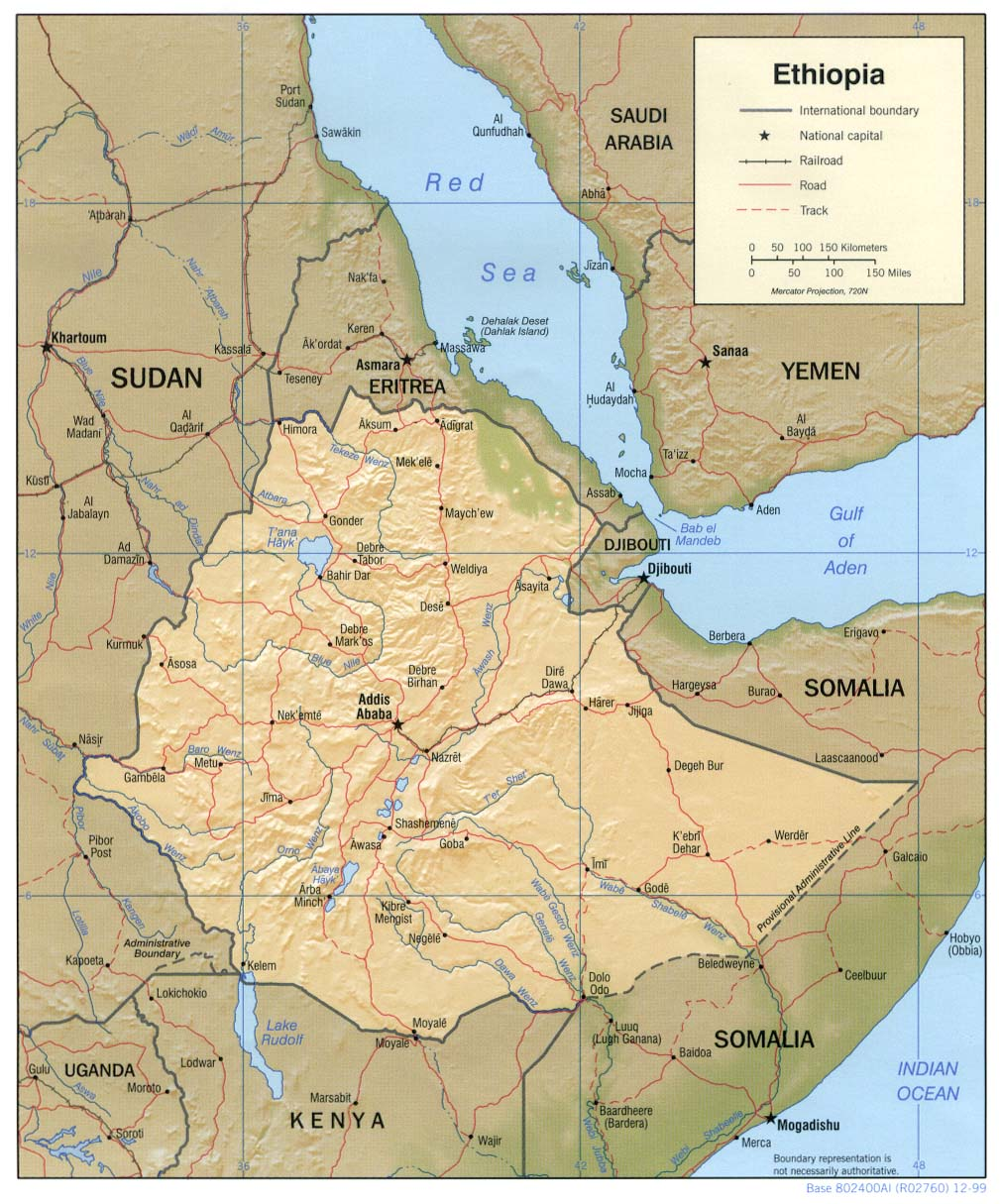
Modern map of Ethiopia

Amedeo, Duke of Aosta, was appointed Viceroy and Governor-General of Italian East Africa in November 1937, with a headquarters in Addis Ababa, the Ethiopian capital. On 1 June 1940, as the commander in chief of the Comando Forze Armate dell'Africa Orientale Italiana (Italian East African Armed Forces Command) and Generale d'Armata Aerea (General of the Air Force), Aosta had about 290,476 locally recruited and Italian-born army, naval and air force personnel, available. By 1 August, mobilisation in Italian East Africa had increased that number to 371,053 troops. On 10 June, the Regio Esercito (Italian Royal Army) was organised in four commands, with the military forces in Ethiopia led by General Pietro Gazzera.

Aosta had the 40th Infantry Division Cacciatori d'Africa and the 65th Infantry Division Granatieri di Savoia from Italy, a battalion of Alpini (elite mountain troops), a Bersaglieri battalion of motorised infantry, several Milizia Volontaria per la Sicurezza Nazionale (MSVN Camicie Nere [Blackshirt]) battalions and an assortment of smaller units; about 70 per cent of the Italian troops were locally recruited Askari. The regular Eritrean battalions and the Regio Corpo Truppe Coloniali (RCTC Royal Corps of Somali Colonial Troops) were among the best Italian units in Italian East Africa and included Eritrean cavalry Penne di Falco (Falcon Feathers).

=== British plans ===
In August 1939, Field Marshall Archibald Wavell, C-in-C Middle East ordered a plan covertly to encourage a rebellion in the western Ethiopian province of Gojjam, which the Italians had never been able entirely to repress after the end of the Second Italo-Ethiopian War in May 1936. In September, Colonel Daniel Sandford arrived to run the project but until the Italian declaration of war, the conspiracy was held back by the British policy of appeasement, intended to avoid a simultaneous war with Germany and Italy. Mission 101 was formed to co-ordinate the activities of the Arbegnoch (Amharic for Patriots). In June 1940, Haile Selassie arrived in Egypt and in July, went to Sudan to meet General William Platt and discuss plans to re-capture Ethiopia, despite Platt's reservations. In July, the British recognised Selassie as emperor of Ethiopia and in August, Mission 101 entered Gojjam province to reconnoitre. Sandford requested that supply routes to the area north of Lake Tana be established before the rains ended and that Selassie should return in October as a catalyst for the uprising. Gaining control of Gojjam required the Italian garrisons to be isolated along the main road from Bahrdar Giorgis south of Lake Tana, to Dangila, Debra Markos and Addis Ababa, to prevent them concentrating against the Arbegnoch. Italian reinforcements arrived in October and patrolled more frequently, just as dissension between local potentates were being reconciled by Sandford's diplomacy.

The Frontier Battalion of the Sudan Defence Force (SDF), set up in May 1940, was joined at Khartoum by the 2nd Ethiopian and 4th Eritrean battalions, raised from émigré volunteers in Kenya. Operational Centres consisting of an officer, five NCOs and several picked Ethiopians were formed and trained in guerrilla warfare, to provide leadership cadres and £1 million was set aside to finance their operations. Major Orde Wingate was sent to Khartoum with an assistant to join the headquarters of the SDF. On 20 November, Wingate was flown to Sakhala to meet Sandford; the British Royal Air Force (RAF) managed to bomb Dangila, drop propaganda leaflets and supply Mission 101, which raised Ethiopian morale, having suffered much from Italian air power since the Second Italo-Ethiopian War. Mission 101 managed to persuade the Arbegnoch north of Lake Tana to spring several ambushes on the Metemma–Gondar road and the Italian garrison at Wolkait was withdrawn in February 1941.

=== Belgian plans ===
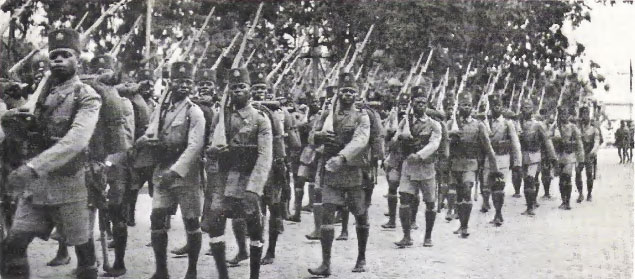
Force Publique soldiers leaving the Congo for Italian East Africa

At the conclusion of the Battle of Belgium in May 1940, the only proper force under Belgian command was the Force Publique ("Public Force" i.e. the colonial army) of the Belgian Congo in Central Africa. It thus made up the bulk of the Free Belgian Forces. Consisting of 15,000 native ranks and Belgian officers, it was well equipped, well disciplined and dispersed throughout the colony. Through the year, the Force Publique's defence obligations were considered too important for it to be spared for any offensive operations. The Allies were uncertain of German intentions toward Portuguese Angola, the Congo's neighbour to the south, and the extent of Vichy French influence in French Equatorial Africa to the north. Belgian members of the Force Publique grew impatient with the colonial administration's perceived inaction and the garrison of Stanleyville mutinied in protest. Governor-General Pierre Ryckmans was forced to send a senior member of his staff to calm them down and explain the importance of the Congo's economic contribution to the war.

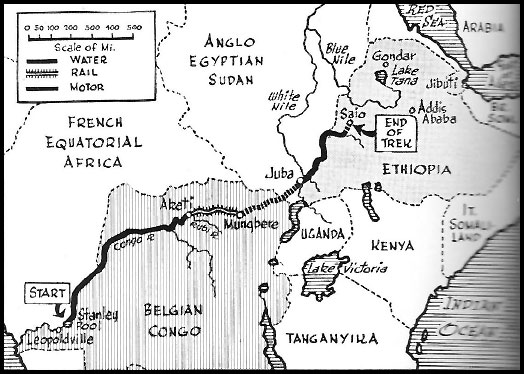
Map of the Belgo-Congolese expedition to Ethiopia

Meanwhile, Ryckmans and Lieutenant General Paul Ermens discussed the possibility of sending an expedition to Italian East Africa with the South African and British military missions in Léopoldville. There were two problems with such an undertaking: Italian territory was thousands of kilometres away and Belgium was not at war with Italy. The Belgian government in exile was wary of declaring war on a country whose royal family had dynastic links with its own, though this attitude changed after it became known that Italian aircraft based in occupied Belgium were attacking Britain and when an Italian submarine sank a Belgian cargo ship. A declaration of war was eventually delivered on 23 November 1940. Two days later, Ryckmans proclaimed that a state of war existed between Italy and the Congo.

Free French Forces consolidated their control over Equatorial Africa at the Battle of Gabon and more German involvement in the Balkan Campaign (begun by Italy in 1939) made the possibility of intervention in Portugal remote. The staff of the Force Publique and the Belgian government then resolved to assemble an expedition to fight in Italian East Africa. Plans were coordinated with the British and in February 1941, after an extended period of preparation, the first group of 8,000 troops and porters set out from the Congo for Ethiopia. Starting in Stanley Pool, they rode a dozen 10 long tons (10 t) barges and a tugboat up the Congo River to Aketi. The expeditionary force took the Vicicongo line (a narrow-gauge railway) from Aketi to Mungbere and drove by lorry to Juba in Sudan where they took to the White Nile. After five days' travel, the first Belgo-Congolese battalion reached Malakal and marched to the border town of Kurmuk before entering Ethiopia.

=== East African Campaign ===
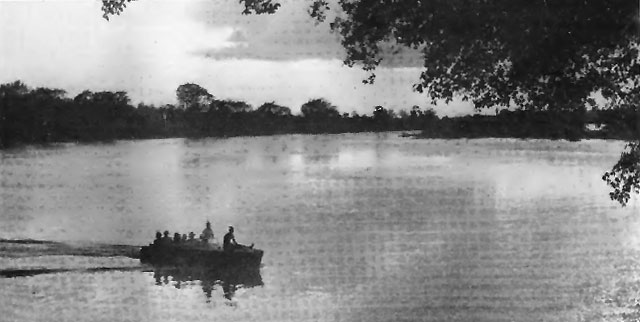
Belgo-Congolese forces crossing the Baro River near Gambela

Following the declaration of war against France and Britain by Italy on 10 June 1940, the East African Campaign began as military forces of the British Empire engaged the Italian East African Armed Forces Command (Comando Forze Armate dell'Africa Orientale) in Italian East Africa. After a series of actions in 1940, British colonial forces from Anglo-Egyptian Sudan invaded the territory and eventually a salient formed around the Baro River. In March 1941, the Italian forces began to withdraw from the salient under increasing pressure. On 8 March the first battalion of the Belgo-Congolese expeditionary force marched from Kurmuk towards the Italian-held town of Asosa.

The expeditionary force attacked three days later in conjunction with troops of the King's African Rifles (KAR), forcing the garrison to retreat to Gidami. Next, the Belgians and Congolese began attacking the town of Gambela directly from the west while two companies of the 2/6 KAR under Captain J. W. E. Mackenzie were sent to outflank it and cut off its link with the Italian headquarters at Saïo under the command of General Carlo De Simone. The Belgians were concerned that the Italians might attempt an offensive over the weakly defended Sudanese border; by taking Gambela they could force Gazzera's forces in western Ethiopia into a defensive position. (Note: It was later revealed that General Pietro Gazzera had planned such an attack but had been vetoed by Viceroy Amedeo on political grounds.) On 22 March, the KAR companies attacked but withdrew to the south when a planned Belgian assault failed to materialise. The Italians were nevertheless surprised by the flanking manoeuvre and retreated to Saïo.

== Siege ==
On 25 March, the Belgo-Congolese battalion and the two companies of the 2/6 KAR occupied Gambela. Exhausted by their journey from the Congo and suffering from dysentery and a lack of artillery, the 1,000 Belgians and Congolese could undertake no further offensive action. Instead they made moves to contain the Italian forces around Saïo from the west, while British troops under General Alan Cunningham conducted operations in Somalia and eastern Ethiopia. The Arbegnoch also threatened the Italian positions. In April, Italian forces burned the elephant grass along the Saïo Plateau to ensure an unobstructed field of fire. That same month the troops of the 2/6th KAR were withdrawn to the Dabus River to link up with the rest of their unit to contain the Italian garrison in Mendi.

=== Actions at Bortai Brook ===
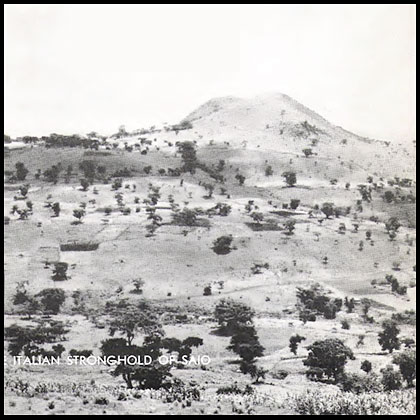
Saïo Mountain, occupied by the Italians

The Italians mined the 40 mi (64 km)-long Saïo–Gambela road that led to the Saïo Plateau 4,000 ft (1,200 m) above the surrounding area. The Belgians began slowly advancing but encountered Italians at the Bortai Brook, which ran perpendicular to the road. The Belgians were strengthened by the arrival of a Stokes mortar company and another battalion. Numbering at 1,600 soldiers and 600 non-combatant porters, they lacked the strength to seize the plateau. With the Italians receiving reinforcements of troops retreating from the east, the Belgians decided to keep the initiative to disguise their small numbers.

Three days of cold weather and rain preceded the offensive. On 15 April, Lieutenant Colonel Edmond van der Meersch led an attack on the brook. A Belgian lieutenant scouting in no man's land was ambushed and killed. A Belgian sergeant caught three Italian officers at gunpoint but lowered his revolver when they claimed to be English, thinking the KAR might have dispatched a liaison party to the area. He was then shot by snipers concealed in the bush. A battle ensued in which four Congolese soldiers were killed. Three Italians and an estimated 40 Eritrean Ascari were killed, with approximately 70 Ascari wounded.

During the ensuing stalemate, the Belgians studied the Italians' tactics; they would post pairs of snipers and artillery spotters in trees guarded at the bases by infantry squads. Their artillery barrages were usually avoided by Belgian patrols, though they would continue up to an hour after they withdrew. On 21 April, the Italians launched a large counterattack. After a two-hour bombardment, Eritrean troops armed with automatic weapons and hand grenades and covered by Galla snipers penetrated the Belgians' left and right flanks. With Van der Meerch's battalion suffering the brunt of the assault, the Belgians retreated behind a pair of hills that obscured them from Italian observers, which the latter then seized.

=== Belgian supply difficulties ===
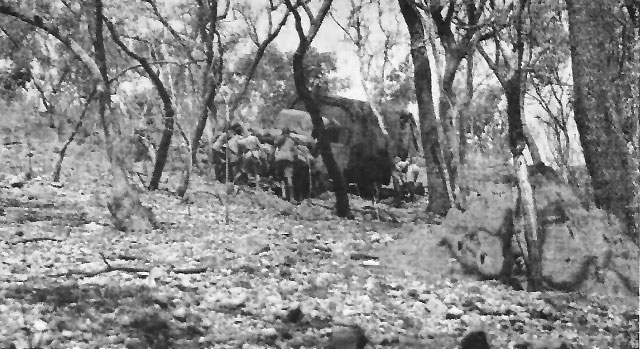
Congolese struggle to move a truck across rough Ethiopian terrain.

By May, Belgian numbers had risen to 2,500 men, under the command of Lieutenant Colonel Leopold Dronkers-Martens. The rainy season had begun, turning the main road from Sudan into mud, cutting off their communications and supplies. The Baro and Sobat rivers were still too low to permit the passage of supply barges from the White Nile and the nearby Gambela airfield was too small for transport aircraft to land. The only means of supply was by airdrop, forcing the Belgians and Congolese to halve their rations. Several porters attempted to bring food in by foot 40 mi (64 km) from Sudan, but died of fatigue and undernourishment. Some of the officers resorted to stripping the camouflage netting from their trucks and seining the Baro River for fish amid frequent outbreaks of Beriberi. The Italians, encamped on fertile soil and well supplied, faced no such problems. The Belgians were also subject to regular air attack.

=== Renewed Belgian offensives ===
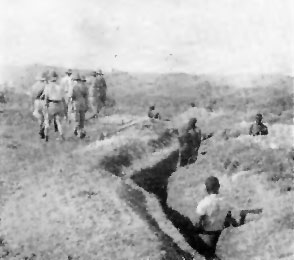
Italian trench captured by Belgian troops

The Belgo-Congolese situation remained difficult until early June, when the Baro and Sobat rivers rose enough for reinforcements from the Congo to reach them. They then decided to try to sever the Italian supply line between Saïo and Mogi, another town upon the plateau. To hold the line near Bortai Brook, the Belgians could only spare around 250 men for an attack. It was hoped that cutting the Italians off would allow the British, stalled in their advance at Gidami, to move south and encircle Saïo. On 9 June the Belgian force attacked Mogi, their flank covered by the arrival of a new battalion from the Congo. The Italian garrison, numbering around 300 men, held off the assault. Believing that the town could only be taken at a heavy cost, the Belgians instead fortified their positions around Mogi and sent patrols to ambush the road by which Saïo was being supplied.

At the regular front, Lieutenant Colonel Dronkers-Martens ordered his troops to increase their patrol activities upon the Saïo Plateau, to make the Italians believe that they were facing superior forces. They used shoot-and-scoot tactics, avoiding counter-battery fire and leaving the Italians with the impression that they were facing multiple consistent points of fire. Gazzera tripled the size of the Mogi garrison and the Italians began to reduce their activity as the Belgians became bolder. Eventually the South African Air Force (SAAF) committed three Hawker Hart biplanes to regularly bomb the Saïo fortress and strafe the surrounding roads. In the east, British forces pressed on, forcing Gazzera to abandon his own headquarters in Jimma in mid June and withdraw to Saïo. The 2/6th KAR secured Gidami and headed southeast to cut the Saïo–Yubdo road. By the end of the month, the British had driven the Italians from the western bank of the Didessa River. The Italian 23rd and 26th Colonial divisions were ordered to retreat through Yubdo, to make their final stand at Saïo. Heavy rain, actions of the Arbegnoch and the raids from the SAAF added to their problems.

=== Final assault and Italian surrender ===
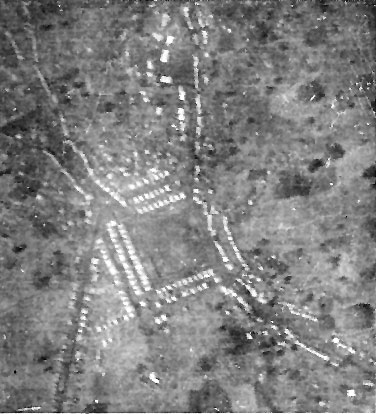
Aerial view of Saïo fortress

Major General Auguste Gilliaert arrived from the Congo before the end of the month. On 27 June Lieutenant General William Platt, advancing with British forces from Sudan, ordered the Belgians to attack the Italian positions if an opportunity presented itself and Gilliaert immediately undertook preparations for an offensive. The plans for taking Mogi were abandoned and the Belgians were to concentrate their efforts against Saïo, so all but 50 of the soldiers besieging Mogi were redeployed.

I based our chances of success upon continuously keeping aggressive activity along Bortai Brook against Mogi and applying Kitchener's maxim that you can try anything against an enemy who refuses to budge himself.

— Gilliaert

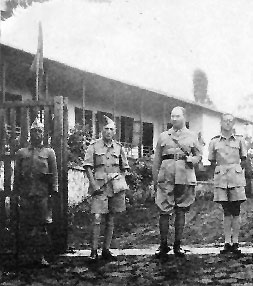
General Auguste Gilliaert and Colonel Leopold Dronkers-Martens at the Italian headquarters in Saïo

Believing the British pursuit to be closer than it actually was, Gazzera ordered the bridge over the Indina River 40 mi (64 km) east of Saïo to be blown, thereby trapping his forces. Though still outnumbered, the Belgians decided to carry on with their offensive. On 2 July, they forced their way over Bortai Brook. At dawn the next day, the Belgian advance posts opened fire on Saïo and half an hour later, the Belgian artillery went into action. The Italians responded with heavy counter-battery fire. A Belgian battalion advanced upon Italian machine gun nests on the two hills that had been occupied since April. The reserve battalion covered their left flank and Gilliaert dispatched the third battalion under Van der Meersch to the right flank down a goat path that had been mapped by patrols over a fortnight. Two artillery batteries gave them covering fire. The Belgians captured the hills and the Italians, being flanked on their left side by Van der Meersch's troops, were unable to make it back to their fortifications atop Saïo mountain. With the Saïo-Gambela road under artillery fire, they retired to the plains to their right. Meanwhile, the 2/6th KAR launched an attack on the Saïo-Yubdo road, continuing throughout the next day with success.

The Italians were under the impression that they were facing three Belgian divisions with South African reinforcements. They also only had about two months' provisions left. Gazzera radioed to the Allies in Addis Abeba his intentions to negotiate a surrender with the Belgians. The Belgians were preparing for another assault when at 13:40 two staff cars bearing white flags drove down the mountain. In them were eight Italian generals, a Catholic priest and Gazzera's chief of staff. Gilliaert met with them a short distance away from Bortai Brook near Gambela. They requested that all hostilities south of the Blue Nile cease and that their army be granted the honours of war. Gilliaert accepted and on 6 July he drove into Saïo to receive the formal surrender of the Italian forces.

== Aftermath ==
=== Analysis ===
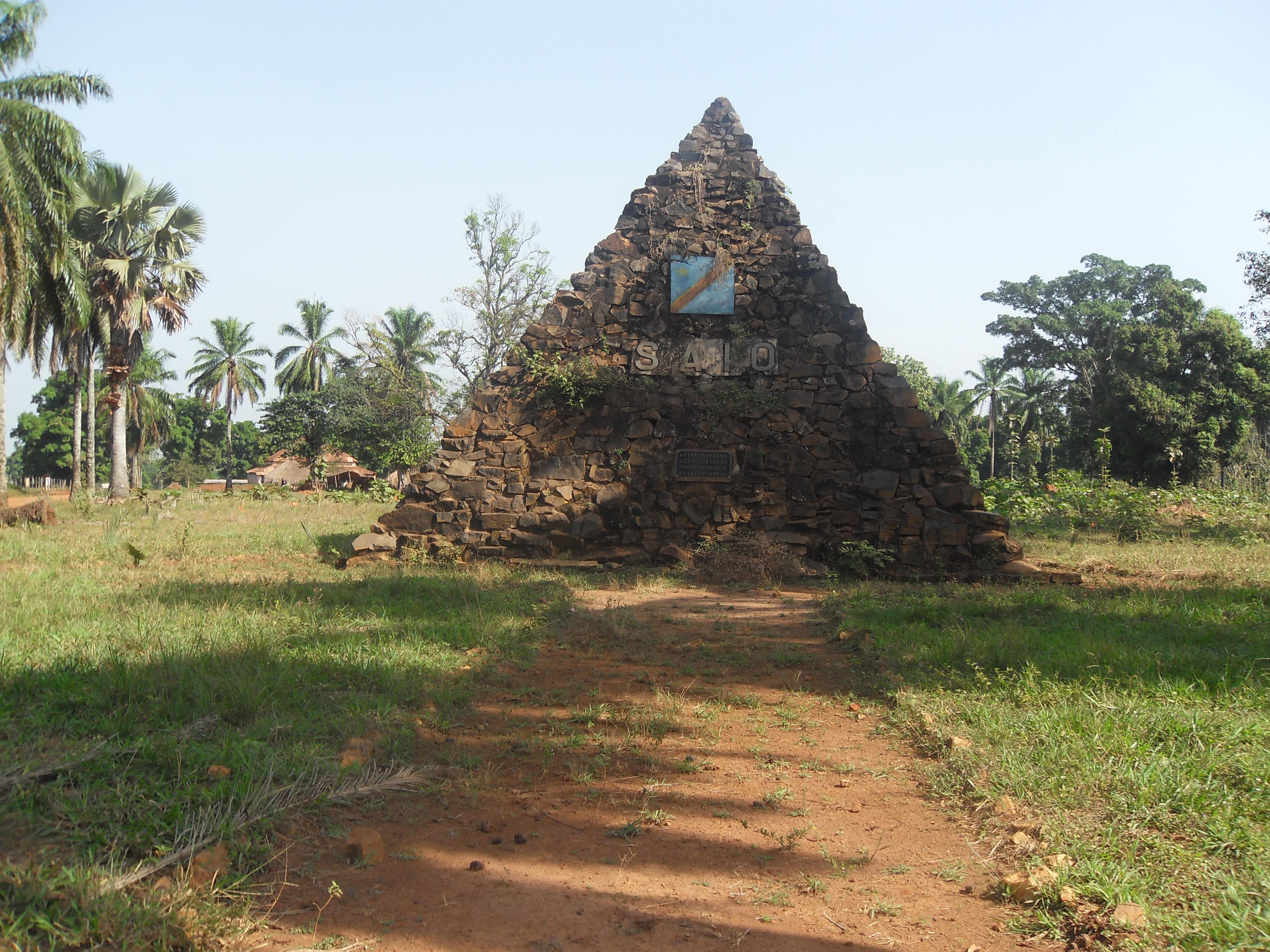
Congolese memorial to the actions at Asosa, Gambela and Saïo in Faradje

With Gazzera's surrender, Gondar became the last area in Ethiopia under Italian control. The market in Saïo was reopened three days after hostilities had ceased and Belgian engineers repaired the Saïo–Gambela road. At Gazzera's request, Gilliaert guaranteed the Eritrean Askari safe passage to British prisoner of war camps in the east and sent Congolese guards to protect them from Ethiopian retaliation. The Belgian force quickly returned to the Congo with their spoils of war. The siege was the first substantial victory for the Free Belgian Forces and greatly improved their morale.

George Weller of the Chicago Daily News travelled to the front and interviewed participants in the Belgo-Congolese expedition. He then wrote several articles about the campaign and wired them back to the United States from Léopoldville. The Belgian government reproduced his reporting in a pamphlet that was subsequently distributed, but it received little attention.

=== Casualties ===
The Belgo-Congolese force lost 462 men during the conflict, 80 per cent of them to disease and it was estimated that the Italians lost three times as many. A total of 6,454 Italian troops were taken prisoner, including Gazzera, eight other generals and 3,500 Askari, along with 20 artillery pieces, 200 machine guns, 250 trucks and 500 mules. Though only numbering about 3,000 soldiers and 2,000 porters, the Belgo-Congolese force had to manage 15,000 prisoners in the former Galla-Sidamo Governorate after the campaign.

=== Commemoration ===
In 1943, a three-sided pyramid was erected in Faradje, Belgian Congo to commemorate the actions of the Congolese in Ethiopia. Each face of the pyramid was inscribed with the name of each place where an engagement took place, including Saïo. Many locations throughout the country—presently the Democratic Republic of the Congo—are named after the battle.

== Bibliography ==
Books

- Barker, A. J. (1971). Rape of Ethiopia, 1936. London: Ballantine Books. ISBN 978-0-345-02462-6.
- Moyse-Bartlett, H. (2012). The King's African Rifles. Vol. II. Luton: Andrews UK. ISBN 978-1-78150-663-9. Archived from the original on 2023-07-06.
- Orpen, N. (1968). East African and Abyssinian Campaigns. South African Forces, World War II. Vol. I (online ed.). Cape Town, SA: Purnell. OCLC 499914466. Archived from the original on 10 February 2017.
- Playfair, Major-General I. S. O.; et al. (1957) [1954]. Butler, J. R. M. (ed.). The Mediterranean and Middle East: The Early Successes Against Italy (to May 1941). History of the Second World War, United Kingdom Military Series. Vol. I (3rd impr. ed.). HMSO. OCLC 494123451. Archived from the original on 28 September 2018.
- Playfair, Major-General I. S. O.; et al. (1956). Butler, J. R. M. (ed.). The Mediterranean and Middle East: The Germans come to the help of their Ally (1941). History of the Second World War, United Kingdom Military Series. Vol. II. HMSO. ISBN 978-1-84574-066-5. Archived from the original on 2020-06-01.
- The Abyssinian Campaign. Miscellaneous Publications. Vol. I. United Kingdom Ministry of Information. 1941. OCLC 150562324. Archived from the original on 6 July 2023.
- Veranneman, Jean-Michel (2014). Belgium in the Second World War (illus. ed.). Barnsley: Pen and Sword. ISBN 978-1-78337-607-0. Archived from the original on 2023-07-06.
- Weller, George (1942). The Belgian Campaign in Ethiopia: A Trek of 2,500 Miles Through Jungle Swamps and Desert Wastes (online ed.). New York: Belgian Information Center. OCLC 1452395. Archived from the original on 4 May 2019 – via Hyperwar.

Journals

- Connell, Dan (2010). "Reviewed Work: Weller's War: A Legendary Foreign Correspondent's Saga of World War II on Five Continents by George Weller, Anthony Weller". African Studies Review. LIII (3): 146–148. doi:10.1017/S0002020600005734. JSTOR 40930972. S2CID 141800345.

Newspapers

- Platt, William (10 July 1946). "Report by Lt. Gen Sir William Platt, K.C.B., D.S.O., On the Operations in Eritrea and Abyssinia". Supplement to The London Gazette of Tuesday, 9th of July, 1946. Part VII. HMSO. OCLC 265544298. Archived from the original on 16 March 2017.

Websites

- Boneza, Raïs Neza (7 June 2014). "Connecting the Dot: Congo and World War II: One of the Other Forgotten Commemorations". Trondheim: Kimpavita Press & Publishers. Archived from the original on 12 March 2017.
