= Belgian government in exile =

Government-in-exile of Belgium during World War II

Belgian Government in London Belgische regering in Londen (Dutch) Gouvernement belge à Londres (French)
- 1940–1944
- Flag Coat of arms
- Motto: Eendracht maakt macht (Dutch); L'union fait la force (French) "Unity makes strength"
- Anthem: La Brabançonne "The Branantian"
- Status: Government-in-exile
- Capital: Brussels
- Capital-in-exile: Bordeaux (1940); London (1940–1944)
- Common languages: Dutch, French
- Demonym: Belgian
- Prime Minister
  - 1940–1944: Hubert Pierlot
- History
  - Established: October 1940
  - Disestablished: September 1944
Preceded by	Succeeded by
Belgium	Belgium
- Today part of: Belgium

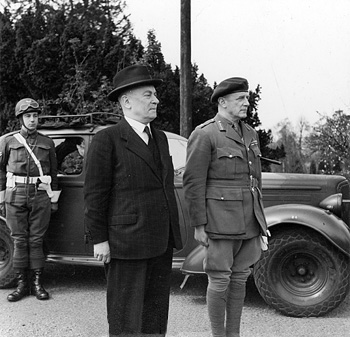
Hubert Pierlot (left), Prime Minister of the government in exile, April 1944.

The Belgian Government in London (Dutch: Belgische regering in Londen; French: Gouvernement belge à Londres), also known as the Pierlot IV Government, was the government in exile of Belgium between October 1940 and September 1944 during World War II. The government was tripartite, involving ministers from the Catholic, Liberal and Labour Parties. After the invasion of Belgium by Nazi Germany in May 1940, the Belgian government, under Prime Minister Hubert Pierlot, fled first to Bordeaux in France and then to London, where it established itself as the only legitimate representation of Belgium to the Allies.

Despite no longer having authority in its own country, the government administered the Belgian Congo and held negotiations with other Allied powers about post-war reconstruction. Agreements made by the government in exile during the war included the foundation of the Benelux Customs Union and Belgium's admission into the United Nations. The government also exercised influence within the Belgian army-in-exile and attempted to maintain links with the underground resistance.

== Background ==
Politically, Belgian politics had been dominated in the interwar period by the Catholic Party, usually in coalition with the Belgian Labour Party (POB-BWP) or the Liberal Party. The 1930s also saw the rise in popularity of Fascist parties within Belgium; most notably Rex which peaked at the 1936 election with 11% of the vote. From the early 1930s, Belgian foreign and domestic policy had been dominated by the policy of neutrality; leaving international treaties and alliances and attempting to maintain good diplomatic relations with Britain, France and Germany.

Despite this policy, Belgium was invaded without warning by German forces on 10 May 1940. After 18 days of fighting, the Belgian military surrendered on 28 May and the country was placed under the control of a German military government. Between 600,000 and 650,000 Belgian men (nearly 20% of the country's male population) had been mobilized to fight.

Unlike the Netherlands or Luxembourg, whose monarchies went into exile alongside the government, King Leopold III, whose mother was German, surrendered to the Germans alongside his army – contrary to the advice of his government. In the days before his surrender, he allegedly attempted to form a new government under the pro-Nazi socialist Henri de Man though this was never realized. He remained a prisoner of the Germans, under house arrest, for the rest of the war. Although the government briefly attempted to negotiate with the German authorities from exile in France, the German authorities passed a decree forbidding members of the Belgian government returning to the country and the talks were abandoned.

== Establishment in London ==
=== Refuge in France ===
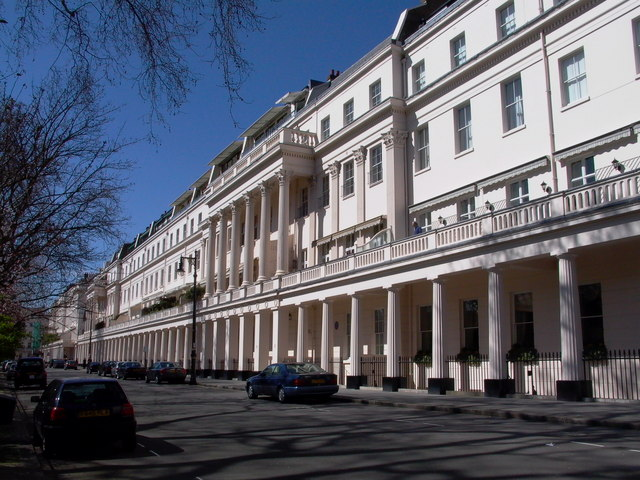
The north side of Eaton Square in London where the government was established in 1940 and remained until September 1944.

The Belgian government in France had been intending to follow the French government of Paul Reynaud to France's overseas empire to continue the fight. Meanwhile, Germany appointed General Alexander von Falkenhausen, an aristocrat and career soldier, as military governor of Belgium. The government was briefly established in Limoges where, under pressure from the French government, they denounced Leopold's surrender. However, when Reynaud was replaced by the pro-German Philippe Pétain, this plan was abandoned. Despite hostility from the new Vichy regime, the Pierlot government remained in France. On 16 September 1940, Vichy demanded the disbandment of the Belgian government, still at that time in Bordeaux:

The Belgian government, whose activity in France has been, for some time now, purely theoretical, will decide to dissolve itself. Some of its members will remain in France as private individuals, while others will go abroad. This decision is part of the suppression of diplomatic missions of countries occupied by Germany, the necessity of which has been pointed out to the French government by the Reich.

— Letter from the Vichy French government, 16 September 1940.

=== Move to London ===
While the government under Pierlot was still in France, the Belgian Minister of Health, Marcel-Henri Jaspar, arrived in London on 21 June. Jaspar believed that the Pierlot government intended to surrender to the Germans, and was determined to prevent it. Jaspar held talks with Charles De Gaulle, and on 23 June gave a speech on BBC radio, in which he stated that he was personally forming an alternative government to continue the fight. His stance was condemned by the Pierlot government in Bordeaux, and he was received coldly by the Belgian ambassador in London, Emile de Cartier de Marchienne. Jaspar, joined by the Socialist burgomaster of Antwerp Camille Huysmans, along with other so-called "London Rebels" formed their own government on 5 July 1940. The British, however, were reluctant to recognize the Jaspar-Huysmans Government.

The present Belgian government is a rump, but it is, as I understand it, a rump of unquestioned lineage, so to speak.

— Alexander Cadogan of the British Foreign Office, December 1940.

The challenge to the Pierlot government's authority spurred it into action. Albert de Vleeschauwer, Pierlot's Minister of the Colonies, arrived in London on the same day as the Jaspar-Huysmans government was formed. As the only Belgian minister with legal power outside Belgium itself, De Vleeschauwer, together with Camille Gutt who arrived soon after, on his own initiative, was able to form a temporary "Government of Two" with British approval in London. Gutt politically marginalised De Vleeschauwer, and thereafter he acted as only a minor figure in the government. The two waited for Paul-Henri Spaak and Pierlot, who had been detained in Francoist Spain en route from France, to join them. Pierlot and Spaak reached London on 22 October 1940, marking the start of the period of the "Government of Four", providing the "official" government with the legitimacy of Belgium's last elected Prime Minister. The British were distrustful of many of the Belgian ministers, as well as the size and legitimacy of the government itself. However, with the arrival of the Prime Minister, it was reluctantly accepted.

The bulk of the Belgian government was installed in Eaton Square in the Belgravia area of London, which before the war had been the location of the Belgian Embassy. Other government departments were installed in nearby Hobart Place, Belgrave Square and Knightsbridge. The offices of the Belgian government were situated close to other governments-in-exile, including Luxembourg, in Wilton Crescent, and the Netherlands in Piccadilly. Approximately 30 members of the Belgian Parliament succeeded in escaping Belgium and took up residence in London and the Belgian Congo.

By December 1940, the British recognized the "government of four" as the legal representation of Belgium, with the same status as the other governments in exile:

His Majesty's Government do regard the four Belgian ministers composing the Belgian Government in London as the legitimate and constitutional Government of Belgium and competent to exercise full authority in the name of the Sovereign State of Belgium.

== Composition ==
Initially numbering just four ministers, the government was soon joined by numerous others. The government in exile comprised both politicians and civil servants in a number of government departments. Most were focused in the Ministries of the Colonies, Finance, Foreign Affairs and Defence, but with skeleton staff in a number of others. By May 1941, there were nearly 750 people working in the government in London in all capacities.

=== "Government of Four" ===
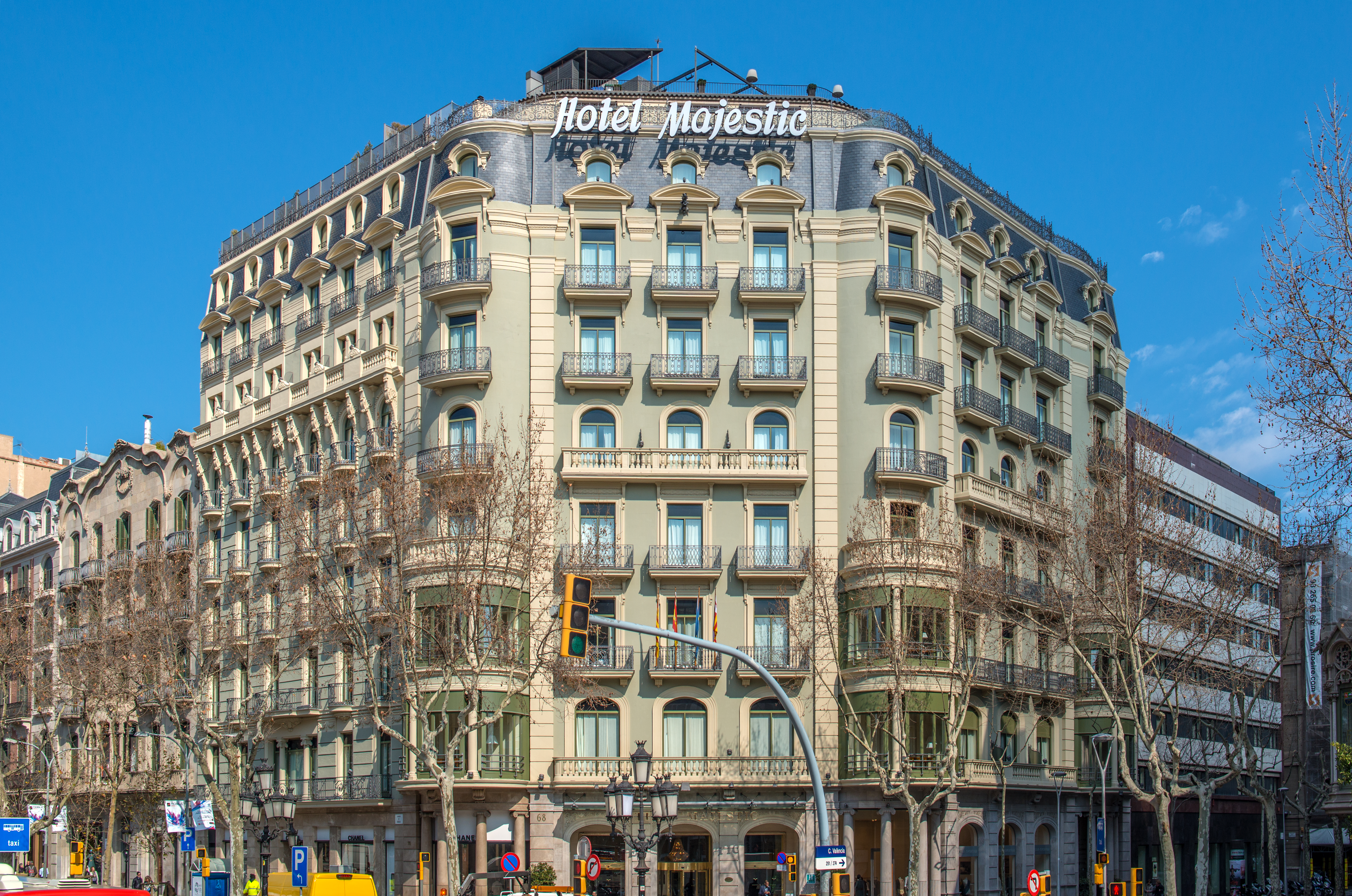
The Hotel Majestic in Barcelona. Pierlot and Spaak escaped from the Spanish police in the hotel to come to Britain in the autumn of 1940. This is commemorated by a plaque on the building.

Portfolio	Name	Party
Prime Minister – Public Education and Defence	Hubert Pierlot	Catholic
Foreign Affairs, Information and Propaganda	Paul-Henri Spaak	POB-BWP
Financial and Economic Affairs	Camille Gutt	None (technical expert)
Colonies and Justice	Albert de Vleeschauwer	Catholic

=== Ministers without Portfolio ===
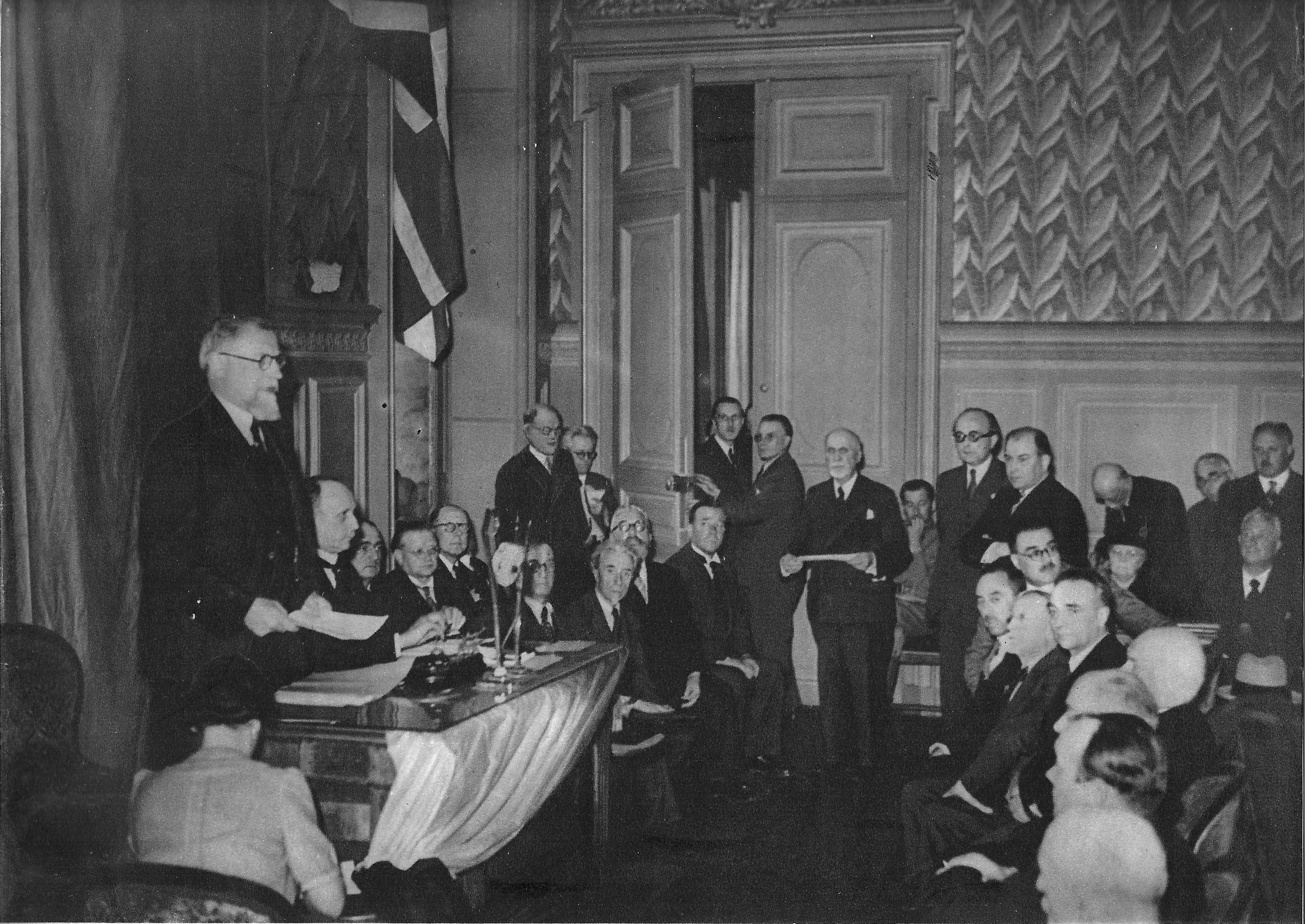
Frans Van Cauwelaert, President of the Chamber in France, June 1940. He would spend the war away from the rest of the government, in New York City.

Name	Party	Name	Party
Henri Denis	None (technical expert)	Charles d'Aspremont Lynden	Catholic
Paul-Émile Janson † (until 1943)	Liberal	Arthur Vanderpoorten † (until January 1943)	Liberal
Léon Matagne	POB-BWP	August de Schryver (until 3 May 1943)	Catholic
Eugène Soudan	POB-BWP		

=== Changes ===
- 19 February 1942
  - Julius Hoste (Liberal) becomes Undersecretary for Public Education.
  - Henri Rolin (POB-BWP) becomes Undersecretary for Defence.
  - Gustave Joassart (technical expert) becomes Undersecretary for Aid to Refugees, Labour and Social Welfare.
- 2 October 1942
  - Antoine Delfosse (Catholic) becomes Minister for Justice, National Information and Propaganda.
  - Henri Rolin (POB-BWP) resigns as Undersecretary for Defence, in the aftermath of a minor mutiny in the Free Belgian forces. His role is assumed by Hubert Pierlot, who becomes Minister for National Defence in addition to his existing titles.
- January 1943
  - Arthur Vanderpoorten (Liberal), who had refused to follow the government to London, is apprehended by the Germans in France. He would later die in Bergen-Belsen concentration camp.
- 3 May 1943
  - August de Schryver (Catholic) becomes Minister for Interior Affairs and Agriculture, after having served as Minister without Portfolio.
- 6 April 1943
  - August Balthazar (POB-BWP) becomes Minister for Public Works and Transport.
- 16 July 1943
  - Gustave Joassart (technical expert) resigns as Undersecretary for Aid to Refugees, Labour and Social Welfare.
- 3 September 1943
  - Joseph Bondas (POB-BWP) becomes Undersecretary for Aid to Refugees, Labour and Social Welfare.
  - Raoul Richard (technical expert) becomes Undersecretary for Supplies.
- 30 March 1943
  - Paul Tschoffen (Catholic) becomes Minister of State.
- 6 June 1944
  - Paul Tschoffen (Catholic) becomes Head of the Mission for Civil Affairs.

== Role ==
The government in exile was expected to fulfill the functions of a national government, but also represent Belgian interest to the Allied powers, leading Paul-Henri Spaak to comment that "all that remains of legal and free Belgium, all that is entitled to speak in her name, is in London".

The British diplomatic mission to Belgium, under Ambassador Lancelot Oliphant, was attached to the government in exile. In March 1941, the Americans also sent an Ambassador, Anthony Biddle Jr., to represent the United States to the governments in exile of Belgium, the Netherlands, Poland and Norway. The Soviet Union, which had broken off diplomatic relations with Belgium in May 1941 (heavily influenced by the then-in force Nazi-Soviet Pact), re-established its legation to the government in exile in the aftermath of the German invasion and eventually expanded it to the rank of Embassy in 1943.

=== Belgian refugees ===
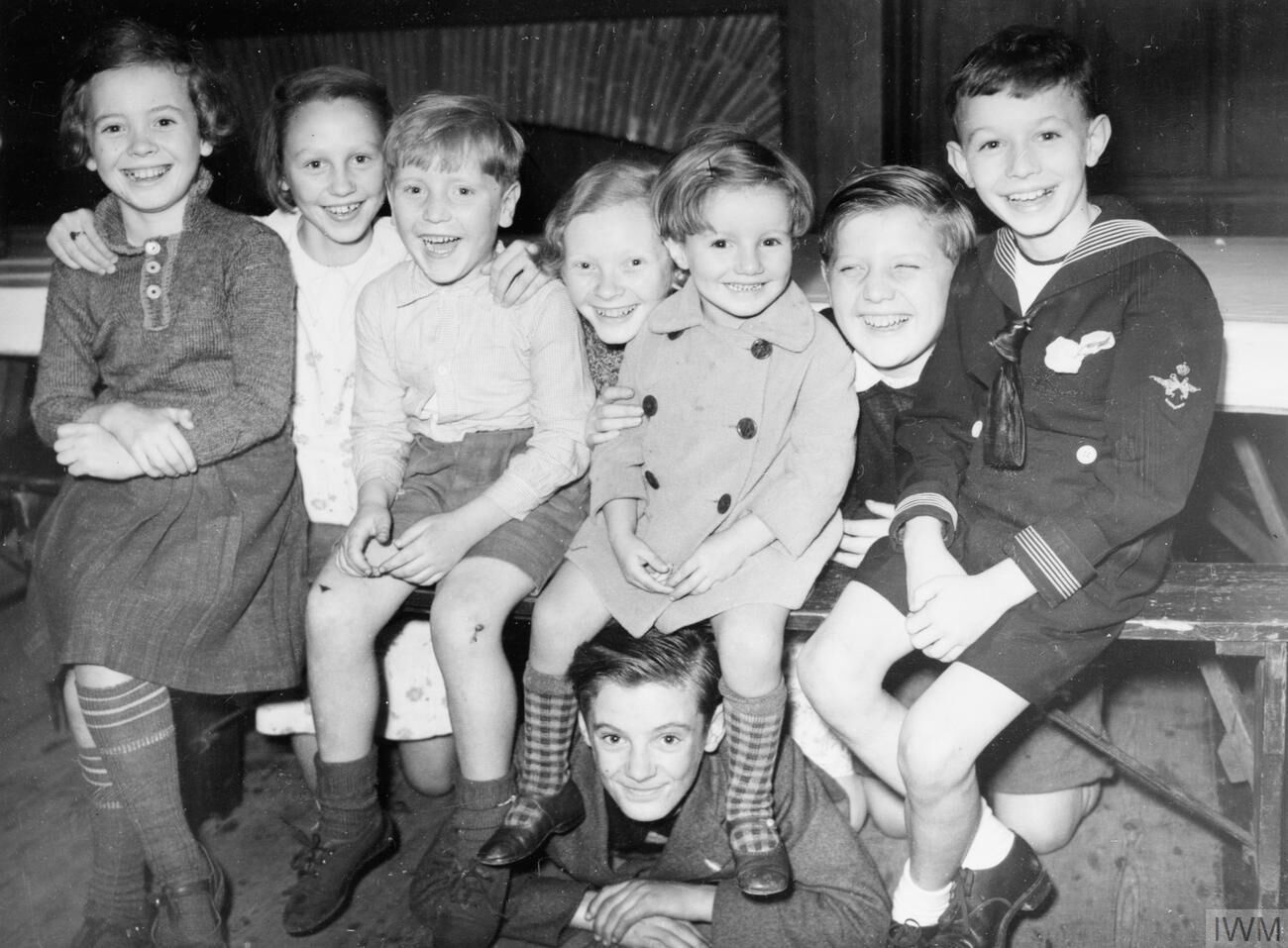
Belgian refugee children in London in 1940

One of the most pressing concerns facing the government in exile in 1940 was the situation of Belgian refugees in the United Kingdom. By 1940, at least 15,000 Belgian civilians had arrived in the United Kingdom, many of them without their possessions. The refugees had originally been dealt with by the British government, however in September 1940, the government established a Central Service of Refugees to provide material assistance and employment for Belgians in Britain.

The British public was exceptionally hostile to Belgian refugees in 1940, because of the belief that Belgium had betrayed the Allies in May 1940. A British Mass Observation report noted a "growing feeling against Belgian refugees" in the United Kingdom, closely linked to Leopold III's decision to surrender.

The government was also involved in the provision of social, educational and cultural institutions to Belgian refugees. In 1942, the government sponsored the creation of the Belgian Institute in London to entertain the Belgian refugee community in London. By 1943, there were also four Belgian schools in Britain with 330 pupils between them, in Penrith, Braemar, Kingston upon Thames and Buxton.

=== Free Belgian forces ===
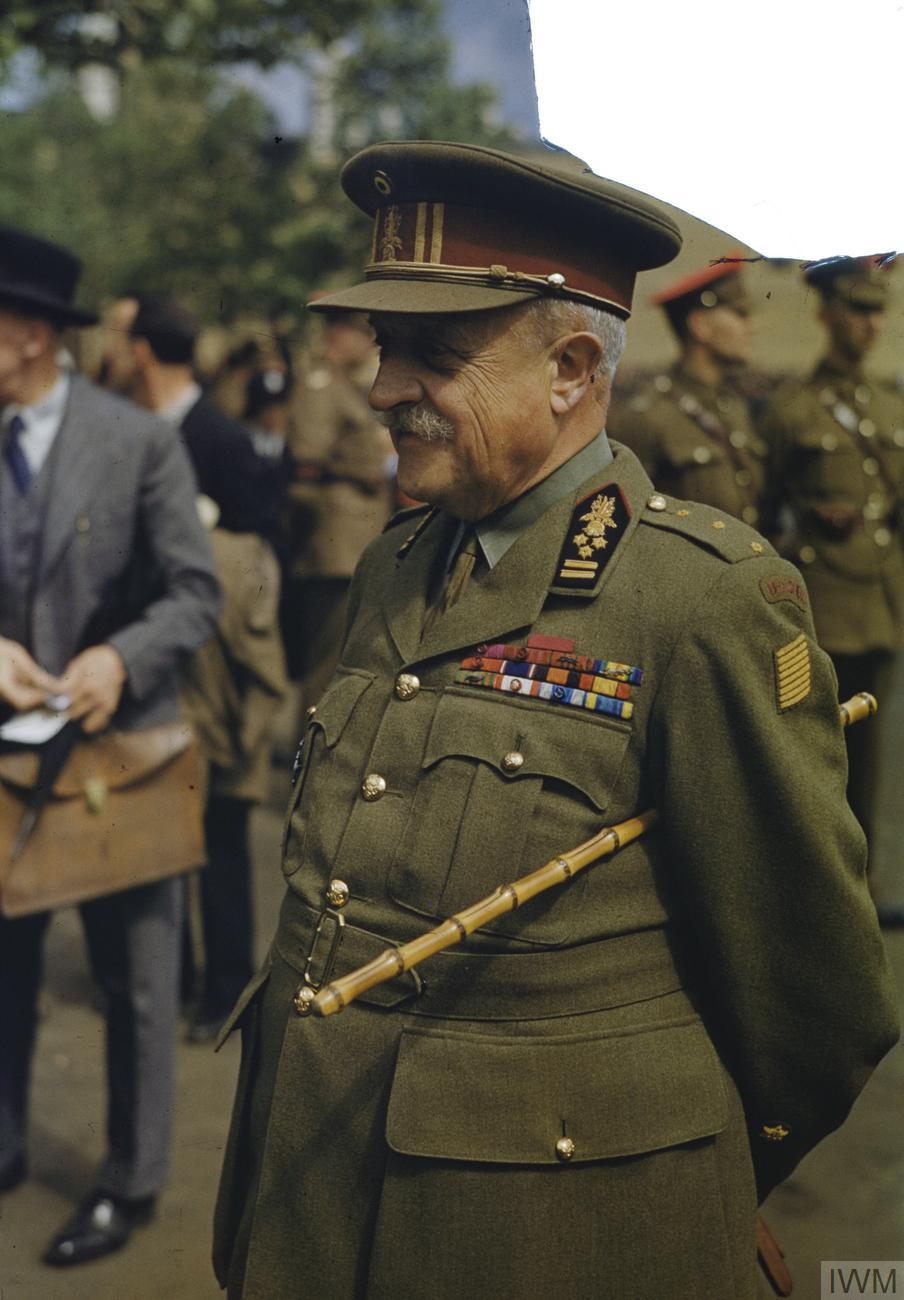
Victor van Strydonck de Burkel in London, 1943. Van Strydonck had been made Baron for leading a cavalry charge in 1918.

In a broadcast on French Radio, shortly after the Belgian surrender, Pierlot called for the creation of an army-in-exile to continue the fight:

With the same youthful courage that responded to the government's call, reunited with the elements of the Belgian military in France and Great Britain, a new army will be levied and organized. It will go into the line alongside those of our allies ... all the forces we have will be put at the service of the cause which has become ours ... It is important to assure immediately and in a tangible way, the solidarity which continues to unite the powers which have given us their support ...

— Hubert Pierlot, Speech on French Radio, 28 May 1940

With some Belgian troops rescued from Dunkirk during Operation Dynamo, as well as Belgian émigrés already living in England, the government in exile approved the creation of a Camp Militaire Belge de Regroupement (CMBR; "Belgian Military Camp for Regrouping") in Tenby, Wales. By July 1940, the camp numbered 462 Belgians, rising to nearly 700 by August 1940. These soldiers were organized into the 1st Fusilier Battalion in August, and the government appointed Lieutenant-Generals Raoul Daufresne de la Chevalerie as commander, and Victor van Strydonck de Burkel as inspector-general of the new force. 28 Belgian airmen participated in the Battle of Britain and the Belgian government was later able to successfully lobby for the creation of two all-Belgian squadrons within the Royal Air Force as well as the creation of a Belgian section within the Royal Navy.

For the first years of the war, a degree of tension existed between the government and the army, which divided its allegiance between government and King. The Free Belgian forces, particular the infantry who had been training since 1940, held the government responsible for not being allowed to fight. In November 1942, 12 Belgian soldiers mutinied, complaining about their inactivity. By 1943, the army's royalist stance had been moderated, allowing the government to regain the support of the military.

=== Treaties and negotiations ===
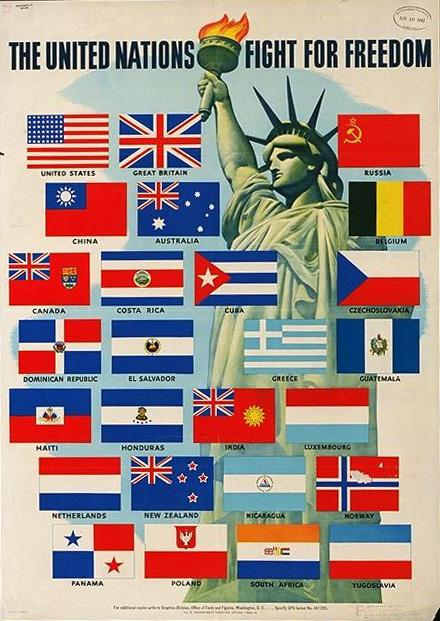
Poster depicting the flags of the "United Nations", including Belgium, that signed the Declaration of 1942.

In September 1941, the Belgian government signed the Atlantic Charter in London alongside other governments in exile, presenting the common goals which the Allies sought to achieve after the war. A year later, the government signed the Declaration by United Nations in January 1942, with 26 other nations, which would set a precedent for the founding of the United Nations Organisation in 1945.

From 1944, the Allies became increasingly concerned with laying the framework of post-war Europe. These were formalized through numerous treaties and agreements from 1944. In July 1944, Camille Gutt attended the Bretton Woods Conference in the United States on behalf of the Belgian government, establishing the Bretton Woods System of currency controls. During the negotiations, Gutt served as an important intermediary between the delegates of the major Allied powers. Through the agreements, the Belgian Franc's exchange rate would be tied to the American Dollar after the war, while the conference also established the International Monetary Fund (IMF) of which Gutt would serve as the first director.

In September 1944, the Belgian, the Netherlands and Luxembourgish governments in exile began formulating an agreement over the creation of a Benelux Customs Union. The agreement was signed in the London Customs Convention on 5 September 1944, just days before the Belgian government returned to Brussels after the liberation. The Benelux Customs Union was a major extension of a pre-war union between Belgium and Luxembourg, and would later form the basis of the Benelux Economic Union after 1958.

== Authority ==
Unlike many other governments in exile, which were forced to rely exclusively on financial support from the Allies, the Belgian government in exile could fund itself independently. In large part, this was due to the fact that the government in exile retained control of most of the Belgian national gold reserves. These had been moved secretly to Britain in May 1940 aboard the naval trawler A4, and provided an important asset. The Belgian government was also in control of the Belgian Congo, which exported large amounts of raw materials (including rubber, gold and uranium) which the Allies relied on for the war effort.

The Belgian government published its own official journal, the Moniteur Belge (Official Government), from London.

== Stances ==
=== Relations with Leopold III ===
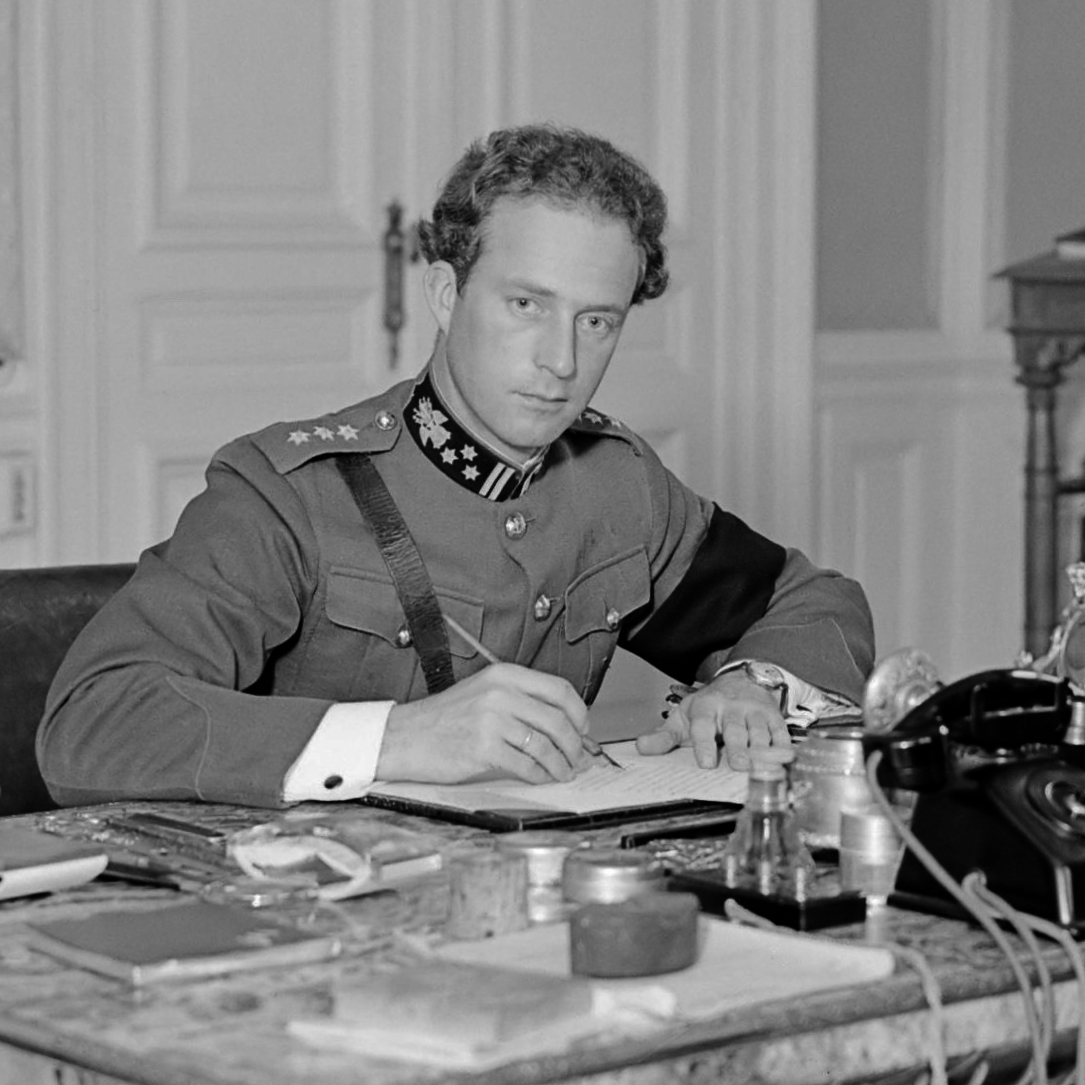
King Leopold III, photographed in 1934, chose to remain in Belgium as a prisoner rather than follow his government into exile

Despite being a constitutional monarch, the King of the Belgians had occupied an important political role within Belgium before the war. The decision of Leopold III to surrender to the Germans – without consulting his own ministers – outraged the Belgian cabinet. The King's apparent opposition to it undermined its credibility and legitimacy. For the first years of the war, the King was viewed as an alternative source of "government" by many, including figures in the Free Belgian military, which served to further undermine the official government in London. Later in the war, the government changed its position to be less belligerent towards the king. Belgian propaganda of the time instead emphasized the King's position as "martyr" and prisoner-of-war and presented him as sharing the same sufferings as the occupied country. In a radio speech on 10 May 1941 (the first anniversary of the German invasion), Pierlot called for Belgians to "rally around the prisoner-King. He personifies our murdered country. Be as loyal to him as we are here."

According to the Constitution of 1831, the Belgian government was allowed to override the wishes of the King if he had been declared incompetent to reign. On 28 May 1940, under pressure from the French government, the Pierlot government in France declared the King to be under the power of the invaders and unfit to reign according to article 82, providing strong legal foundations and making itself the only official source of government. The government, however, refused to declare a republic. Although the King technically remained the only person able to receive diplomatic legations and conclude treaties, the government in exile was able to do both during the war independently.

On the return to Belgium, the issue of the monarch remained contentious and on 20 September 1944, shortly after the liberation, Leopold's brother Prince Charles, Count of Flanders, was declared prince regent.

=== Relations with the Resistance ===
We trust fully in the power of Britain to deliver us from German bondage ... We claim the right to share in the burden and honour of this fight in the measure of our modest, but not altogether negligible, resources. We are not defeatists ...

— Camille Huysmans in a radio broadcast of 23 June 1940.

The government of Jaspar-Huysmans called for the creation of organized resistance in occupied Belgium from London, even before the French surrender in 1940.

The official government, after arriving in London, managed to obtain control over the French and Dutch language radio broadcasts to occupied Belgium, broadcast by the BBC's Radio Belgique. The radio station was essential for keeping the resistance and public alike informed, and was placed under the control of the journalist Paul Lévy. Amongst those working in the radio was Victor de Laveleye, a former government minister who worked as a newsreader, who is credited for inventing the "V for Victory" campaign.

During the early years of the war, the government found it difficult to get into contact with the resistance in occupied Belgium. In May 1941, the Légion Belge group dispatched a member to try to establish contact but it took a full year for him to reach London. Radio contact was briefly established in late 1941 but was extremely intermittent between 1942 and 1943. A permanent radio connection (codenamed "Stanley") with the largest group, the Armée Secrète, was only established in 1944.

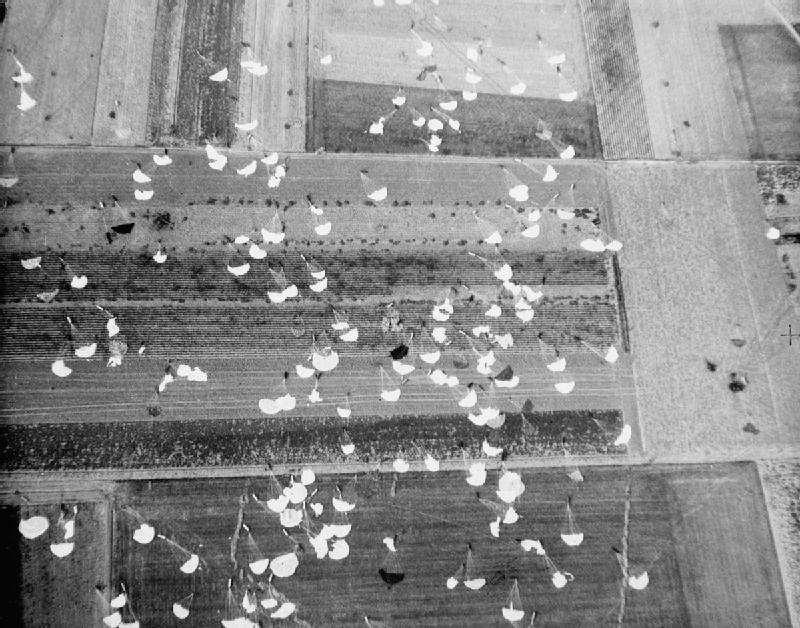
Supplies for the Resistance dropped by British aircraft in the countryside north of Brussels.

The apparent isolation of the government in exile from events in Belgium meant that many resistance groups, particularly those whose politics differed from the established government, viewed it with suspicion. The government, for its part, was afraid that resistance groups would turn into ungovernable political militias after liberation, challenging the government's position and threatening political stability. Despite this, the resistance was frequently reliant on finance, equipment and supplies which only the government in exile and the British Special Operations Executive (SOE) were able to provide. During the course of the war, the government in exile delivered 124–245 million francs, either dropped by parachute or transferred via bank accounts in neutral Portugal, to the Armée Secrète alone. Smaller sums were distributed to other organisations.

The government in exile attempted to rebuild its relationship with the resistance in May 1944 by establishing a "Coordination Committee" of representatives of the major groups, including the Légion Belge, Mouvement National Belge, Groupe G and the Front de l'Indépendance. However, the committee was rendered redundant by the liberation in September.

== Return to Belgium ==
Nobody had been warned of our arrival. The cars, which took us into town, were preceded by a jeep. One of our colleagues stood in it, shouting to the few citizens we passed: "Here is your Government". I must confess that this produced no reaction at all, neither hostility nor enthusiasm, just total indifference

— Paul-Henri Spaak, on the government's return to Brussels

Allied troops entered Belgium on 2 September 1944. On 3 September, the Guards Armoured Division liberated the capital, Brussels. The government in exile returned to Brussels on 8 September 1944. "Operation Gutt", a plan devised by Camille Gutt to avoid rampant inflation in liberated Belgium by limiting the money supply, was put into action with great success.

On 26 September, Pierlot formed a new government of national unity (Pierlot V) in Brussels. The new government included many of the ministers (including all of the "four") from London, but for the first time also included the Communists. In December 1944, a new triparate government was formed, with Pierlot still as Prime Minister. In February 1945, having been Prime Minister since 1939, Pierlot was finally replaced by the Socialist, Achille Van Acker.

The government in exile was one of the last governments in which the traditional parties which had dominated Belgium since its creation were still present. In 1945, the POB-BWP changed its name to the Belgian Socialist Party (PSB-BSP) and the Catholic Party became the Christian Social Party (PSC-CVP).

== See also ==
- Belgian Congo in World War II
- Belgium in World War II
- Free French Forces
- German occupation of Belgium during World War II
- Politics of Belgium
