= Burkle (surname) =

Burkle, Bürkle or Buerkle (English: /ˈbɜːrkəl/ BUR-kəl) is a German surname. Notable people with the surname include:

- Ann Marie Buerkle (born 1951), American nurse, attorney, and politician
- Dick Buerkle (1947–2020), American runner
- Frederick M. "Skip" Burkle Jr. (born 1940) is an American physician and activist
- Heinrich Bürkle de la Camp (1895–1974), German army doctor
- Ronald Burkle (born 1952), American investor and philanthropist
- Winifred Burkle, fictional character on the American TV series Angel
- Yul Bürkle (born 1974), Venezuelan actor and model
