= Free Belgian forces =

Soldiers from Belgium after Belgium's surrender in WW2

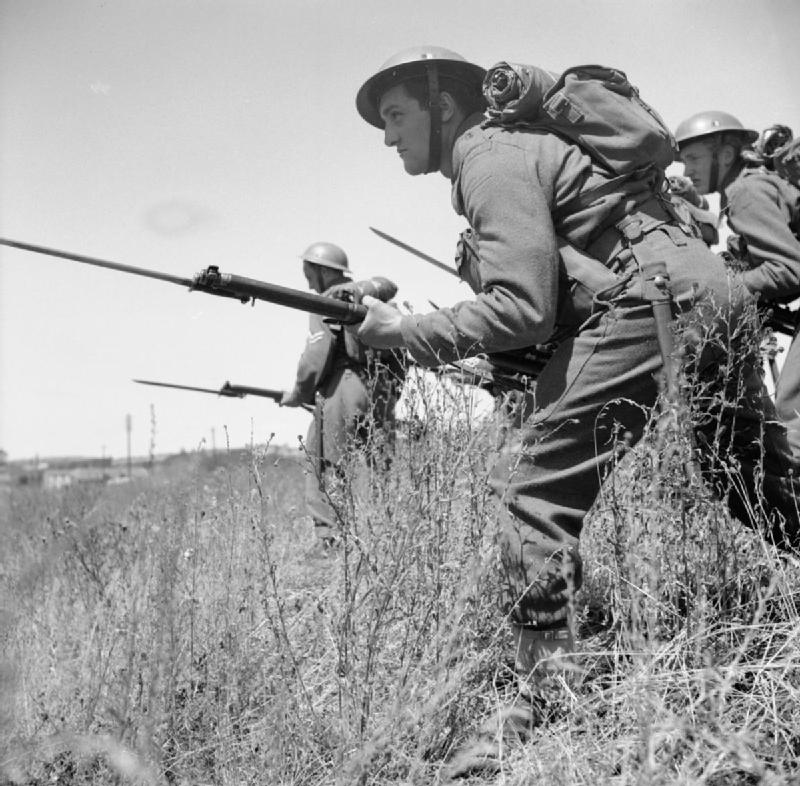
Belgian soldiers on manoeuvers in Wales, July 1941

The Free Belgian forces (French: Forces belges libres, Dutch: Vrije Belgische Strijdkrachten) were soldiers from Belgium and its colonies who fought as part of the Allied armies during World War II, after the official Belgian surrender to Nazi Germany. It is distinct from the Belgian Resistance which existed in German-occupied Belgium.

In 1940, Belgian pre-war émigrés and former soldiers who had escaped occupied Belgium were formed into units within the British military which later fought in the European and Mediterranean Theatres. These included an infantry formation, which later became the Brigade Piron, as well as Commando and paratroop units. Belgians also served in the Royal Air Force and Royal Navy, serving in Belgian-only units as well as in majority-British units. Significant numbers of soldiers from the Belgian Congo fought on the Allied side against the Italians in East Africa. After the liberation of Belgium in September 1944, the Free Belgian forces formed the foundations of the new Belgian army.

== Background ==
Belgian involvement in World War II began when German forces invaded Belgium, which had been following a policy of neutrality, on 10 May 1940. After 18 days of fighting, Belgium surrendered on 28 May and was placed under German occupation. During the fighting, between 600,000 and 650,000 Belgian men (nearly 20% of the country's male population) had served in the military. Most were made prisoners of war and detained in Germany, though some were released before the end of the war. Leopold III, king and commander in chief of the army, also surrendered to the Germans on 28 May along with his army and remained a prisoner for the rest of the war. The Belgian government fled first to Bordeaux in France, and then to London in the United Kingdom where it formed an official government in exile in October 1940.

== Creation of the Free Belgian forces ==
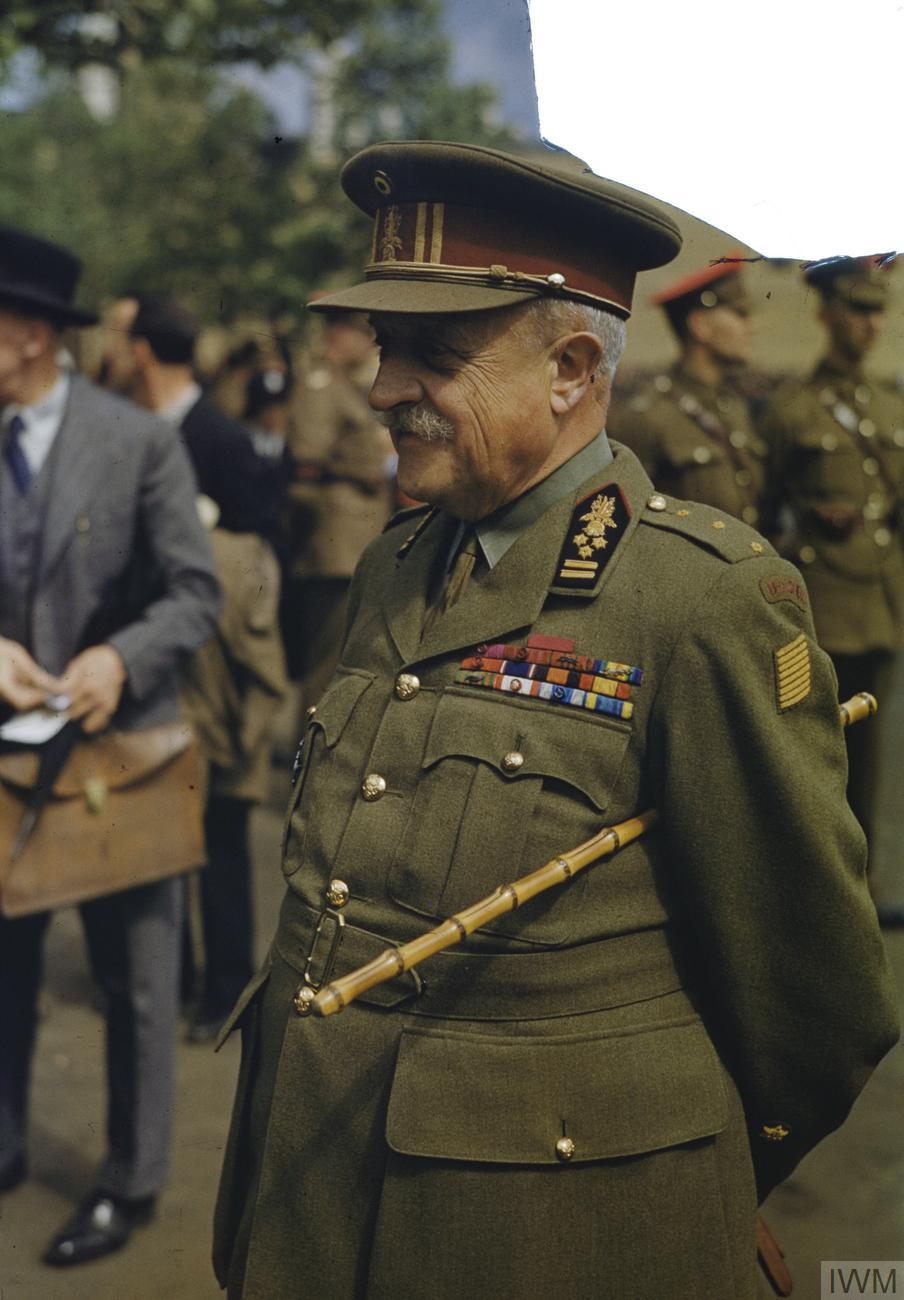
Victor van Strydonck de Burkel in London, 1943

In a broadcast on French Radio shortly after the Belgian surrender, the Prime Minister Hubert Pierlot called for the creation of an army-in-exile, originally intended to continue fighting alongside the French:

With the same youthful courage that responded to the government's call, reunited with the elements of the Belgian military in France and Great Britain, a new army will be levied and organized. It will go into the line alongside those of our allies ... all the forces we have will be put at the service of the cause which has become ours ... It is important to assure immediately and in a tangible way, the solidarity which continues to unite the powers which have given us their support ...

— Pierlot's speech on French Radio, 28 May 1940

In Britain, the concept of foreign enlistment into the British army, or the creation of foreign armed forces on British soil, had been approved in the Emergency Powers (Defence) Act 1939 and Allied Forces Act 1940. The first components of a Belgian military in Britain was created after the French surrender when the Camp Militaire Belge de Regroupement (CMBR; "Belgian Military Camp for Regrouping") was created in Tenby (Wales) in order to reform a military force from Belgian soldiers rescued from Dunkirk during Operation Dynamo, refugees, and expatriates living in the United Kingdom. By July 1940, the camp numbered 462 Belgians, and nearly 700 by August and 900 by November. These soldiers were organized into the 1st Fusilier Battalion in August, and the government appointed Lieutenant-Generals Raoul Daufresne de la Chevalerie as commander, and Victor van Strydonck de Burkel as inspector-general of the new force. In July 1940, a British Mass Observation report remarked that Belgian refugees in civilian employment in the United Kingdom were causing friction with British workers because they were considered to be pushing British workers out of jobs. The same report noted the "possible need for a Belgian Legion". In February 1941, a Belgian artillery battalion was formed.

Belgian volunteers continued to join the Free Belgian forces throughout the war, most crossing through occupied and Vichy France, as well as Francoist Spain. Because the French refused to provide any form of visa to Belgians of military age, many of those arriving in England tended to be old and to have already had long military careers. This created a problem for the Free Belgian forces, which was therefore generally "top heavy", with a greater ratio of (older) officers to other ranks.

Despite the formation of all-Belgian ground units from late 1940, many Belgian volunteers – especially those in the Royal Air Force – served in majority British units, particularly in the early years after the formation of the Free Belgian forces.

== Belgian Army in the United Kingdom ==
=== Brigade Piron ===
In 1940, the Belgian government-in-exile decided to raise a military unit from pre-war Belgian émigrés and soldiers rescued from Dunkirk. The original forces were known as the 1st Fusilier Battalion. (Note: The two Fusilier Battalions formed in Britain and Canada between 1940–41 should not be confused with the 57 later Fusilier Battalions formed in Belgium after the liberation from October 1944.) A 2nd Fusilier Battalion was formed in Canada from Belgian émigrés in the Americas.

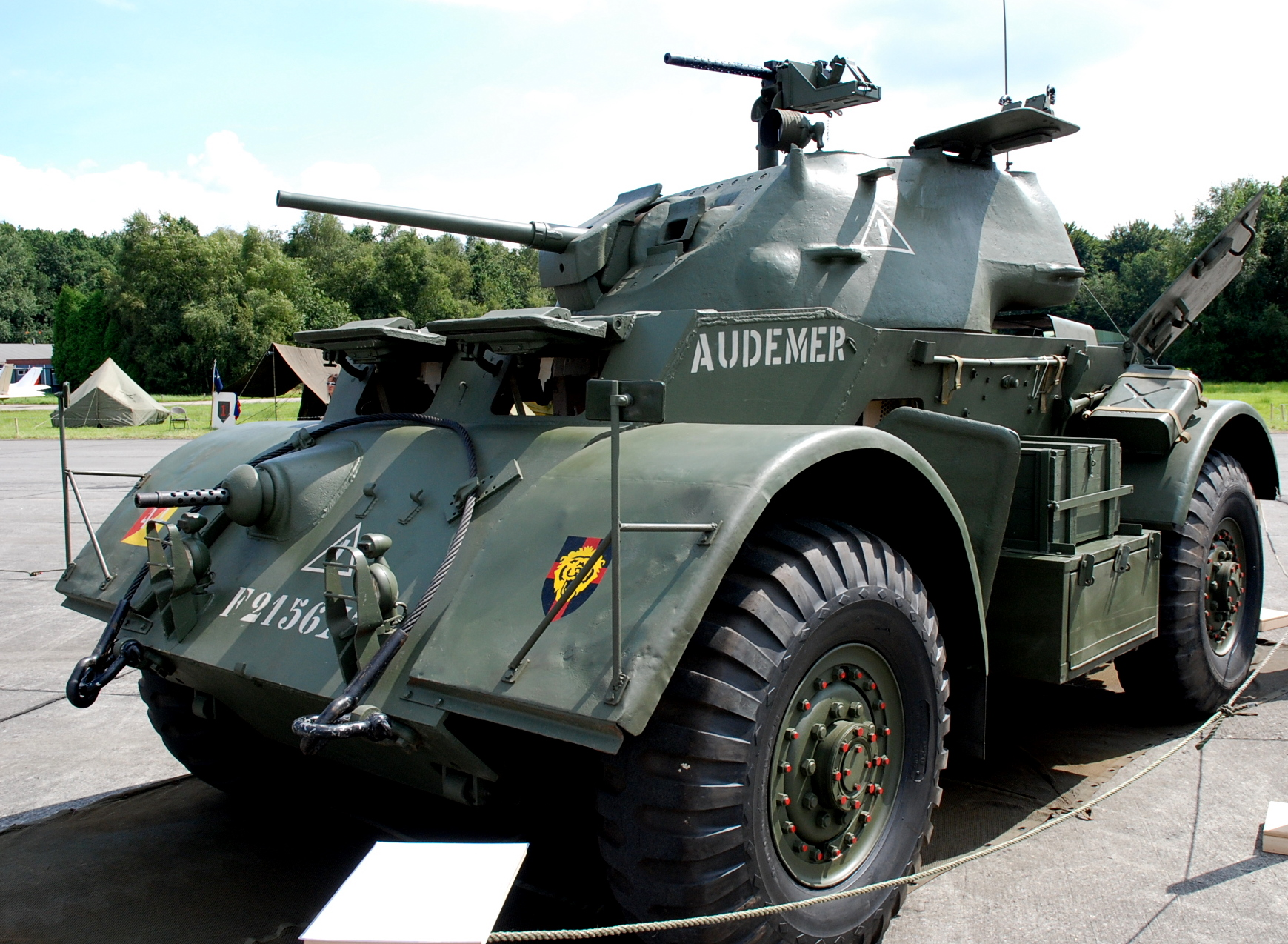
A Staghound armoured car in the markings of the 1st Belgian Armoured Car Squadron of the Brigade Piron.

In 1942, the various Belgian ground forces units in the United Kingdom were amalgamated into the 1st Belgian Infantry Brigade, more often known as the Brigade Piron after its commanding officer, Colonel Jean-Baptiste Piron. The unit not only included motorized infantry, armoured cars and artillery but also various logistics and medical support units. In March 1944, an artillery battery of four 25-pounder guns operated by troops from Luxembourg was added to the brigade's artillery unit. 80 Luxembourgers were serving with the Brigade Piron by August 1944 when the Brigade landed in Normandy.

The brigade arrived in Normandy on 8 August 1944 and was involved in the fighting in Northern France alongside British and Canadian units. The brigade was one of the first Allied units to enter Belgium, crossing the border on 3 September. The following day, the brigade was the second Allied unit to enter Brussels (after the Welsh Guards). After the liberation of Belgium, the brigade was involved in fighting in the Netherlands until November 1944 when it returned to Belgium and reorganized, expanding on account of the new manpower. The reorganized brigade had three infantry battalions, an artillery regiment of six batteries, and an armored car regiment. Returning to combat in the Netherlands in April 1945, the brigade's units fought at Nijmegen and Walcheren.

=== No. 10 (Inter-Allied) Commando ===
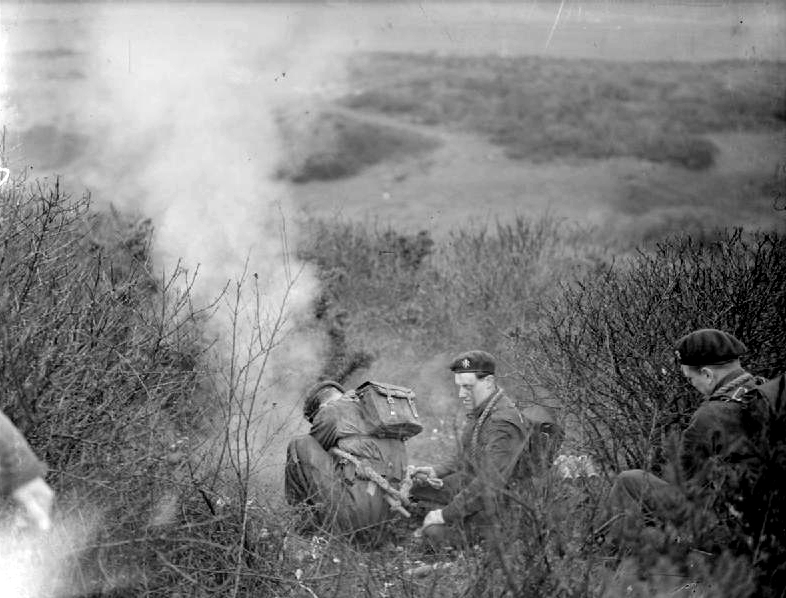
Belgian Commandos, wearing the distinctive green beret, fire a mortar during a training exercise, 1945.

The British No. 10 Commando was made up of soldiers from across occupied Europe, organized by nationality in eight troops. No. 4 Troop, created in August 1942, was Belgian and was commanded by Captain Georges Danloy. The original volunteers spent nearly a year in training, before leaving for Italy to fight alongside the British Eighth Army during the battles around Sangro river in the winter of 1943.

In 1944, the troop was sent to Yugoslavia, where it raided numerous Dalmatian islands held by the Germans. In the autumn of 1944, the troop was part of Operation Infatuate to capture the island of Walcheren at the head of the Scheldt Estuary, alongside Free Norwegian, Free Dutch, Free French and British Commandos. The unit later moved into Germany.

=== 5th Special Air Service ===
In 1942, 120 volunteers from the 2nd Fusilier Battalion were given parachute training and formed into a new unit, the Belgian Independent Parachute Company. The new unit was commanded by Commander Jean Thise, later replaced by Captain Edouard Blondeel.

In February 1944, the company joined the elite British Special Air Service's SAS Brigade. It was renamed the 5th SAS Regiment in March 1945, even though it was only battalion-strength. The 5th SAS were deployed on numerous missions behind enemy lines. In July 1944, the small groups from 5th SAS were dropped by parachute into northern France to perform reconnaissance and sabotage missions and to link up with the French Resistance. Amongst their missions was to harass the German retreat from the Falaise Gap.

In August 1944, it was the first Allied unit to enter Belgium when it was deployed to the Ardennes and Limburg. The small team, mounted in armed Jeeps, managed to kill more than 300 German soldiers and destroy over 100 vehicles during the mission. Later, the unit fought in the Netherlands and also served as a reconnaissance unit in the Ardennes during the Battle of the Bulge in the winter of 1944. After the war it was sent to Germany to arrest leading Nazis, and was responsible for arresting Karl Doenitz, Alfred Rosenberg and Joachim von Ribbentrop as well as numerous others.

== Belgians in the Royal Air Force ==
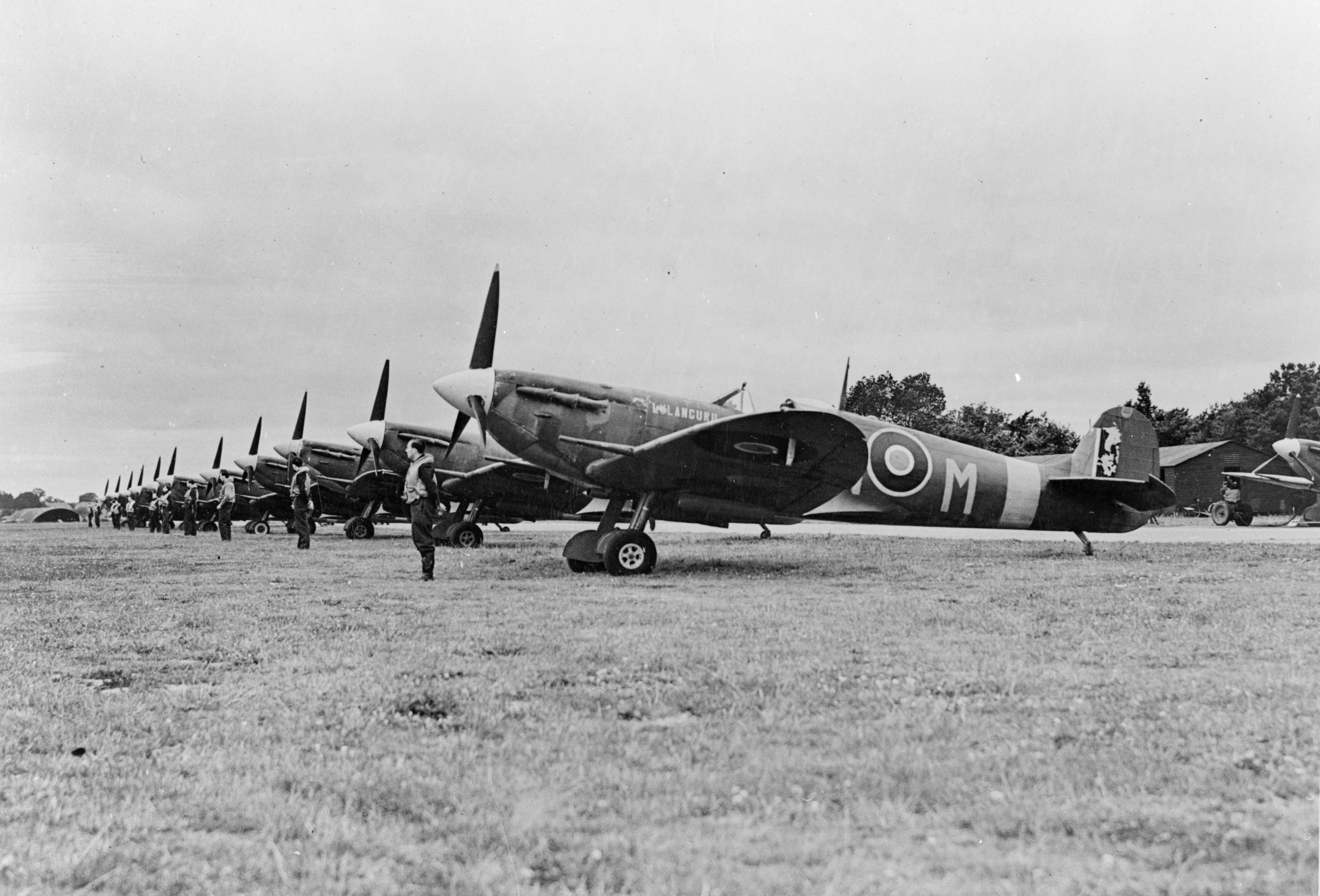
Belgian pilots and Spitfires of No. 350 Squadron at RAF Kenley, 1942

During the 18 Days' Campaign, the Belgian air force had lost practically all its equipment and 28 pilots had been killed. After the French surrender, many Belgian pilots escaped to England. 15 Belgian pilots served in fighter squadrons of the Royal Air Force (RAF) during the Battle of Britain in June 1940 while a further 14 others served in auxiliary roles, such as navigators or gunners. All served in predominantly British squadrons rather than national units. By 1943, there were more Belgian pilots in the Royal Air Force than there had been in the Belgian air force in 1940.

In November 1941, the all-Belgian 350 Squadron, was created. The regimental standard of the 2nd Régiment d'Aéronautique was smuggled out of occupied Belgium and presented to the unit. The incident was depicted in the 1943 British film The Flemish Farm. A year later, a second all-Belgian squadron, 349 Squadron, was created. Both units were equipped with Spitfires. By June 1943, some 400 Belgian pilots were serving with the RAF. The Belgian section of the RAF achieved its 100th "kill" in January 1944. Both squadrons served in the European theatre and were involved in the Normandy Landings.

In 1943, a Belgian pilot from 609 Squadron, Jean de Selys Longchamps, strafed the Gestapo headquarters in Brussels, after flying through the streets at low-altitude. Operation Carthage an air raid on the Gestapo headquarters in Copenhagen, Denmark in March 1945, was led by a Belgian, Wing-Commander Michel Donnet, who had escaped from occupied Belgium in a home-made aircraft.

During the course of the war, 1,900 Belgians served in the RAF, Royal Canadian Air Force (RCAF) and the South African Air Force (SAAF). 225 were killed in action.

== Royal Navy Section Belge ==
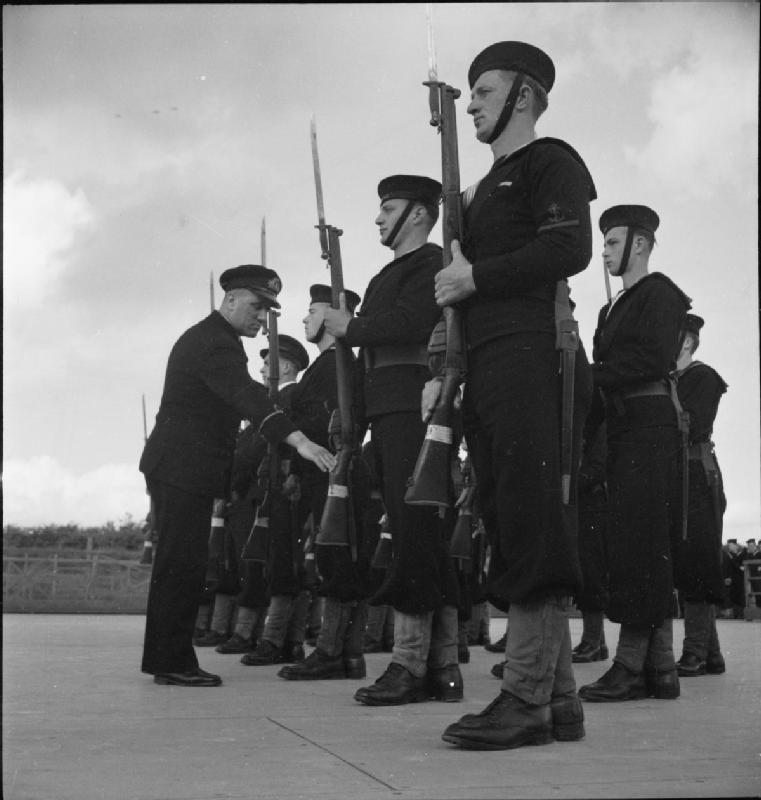
Belgian sailors training at Skegness in England, 1945

On the initiative of Lieutenant Victor Billet, a Belgian sailor, the Royal Navy Section Belge (RNSB) (Note: The French name Section Belge (and the accompanying acronym RNSB) was adopted in order to avoid any confusion with the Royal Navy Patrol Service (RNPS).) was created in October 1940. By 1941, the RNSB numbered 350 men with several hundred more Belgians serving on other British naval and merchant ships. Unlike the neighbouring Netherlands, which had possessed a sizeable navy, the Belgian Corps de Marine had had only few ships before the war. With the surrender in May 1940, many vessels, including A4 which had evacuated Belgian gold to Britain during the campaign, travelled to neutral Spain and interned themselves rather than return to occupied Belgium. Consequently, most of the volunteers of the RNSB had been civilian fishermen or members of the Merchant Navy rather than career soldiers.

Around 1,400 men of the Belgian fishing fleet had left for Britain after the Belgian surrender. Three Belgian trawlers even took part in the evacuation of the British Expeditionary Forces from Dunkirk, rescuing 4,300 British soldiers between them. Their ships and crews were put at the disposal of the Royal Navy, for coastal patrols and launching barrage balloons. From October 1940, many joined the RNSB.

The unit was placed under command of Lieutenant-Commander Georges Timmermans. Victor Billet himself was posted MIA during the Dieppe Raid in 1942. The RNSB operated two small corvettes, HMS Godetia and Buttercup, within the Royal Navy from 1942. Both corvettes served as convoy escorts during the Battle of the Atlantic, the Caribbean and also as part of the escorting fleet during D-Day.

The RNSB also operated the 118th Minesweeper Flotilla, composed of MMS-class minesweepers, from Harwich from 1943. The 118th served in the English Channel and North Sea clearing paths through German minefields. In November 1944, the flotilla was involved in clearing the Scheldt Estuary to the Belgian port of Antwerp to enable it to be used by the Allies.

After liberation, the Belgian government decided to increase the size of the RNSB to 1,200 men which would later form the backbone of the fledgling Belgian Navy.

== Force Publique ==
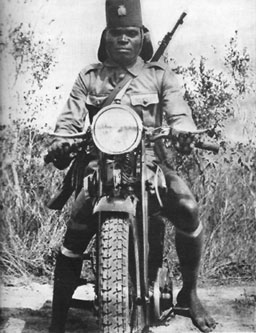
Force Publique dispatch rider after the Siege of Saïo, 1942

The Force Publique (or "Public Force") was a combined police and military force of the Belgian Congo. It had a peacetime strength of 18,000, making it one of the largest standing colonial armies in Africa at the time. During World War II, it was reinforced, numbering 40,000, and constituted the bulk of the Free Belgian forces. Like other colonial armies of the time, the Force Publique was racially segregated; it was commanded by 280 white officers and NCOs but other ranks were exclusively native Congolese. The Force Publique had never been allowed the more modern equipment given to the Belgian army before the war, and consequently had to use outdated equipment and weapons, like the Stokes mortar and the Saint Chamond 70 mm howitzer.

In June 1940, three battalions of the Force Publique were sent to Abyssinia alongside British forces to fight the Italians in the East African Campaign. In May 1941, the Force Publique, under Major-General Auguste-Éduard Gilliaert and Lt.-Col. Leopold Dronkers Martens, successfully cut off the retreat of Italian army of General Pietro Gazzera at the Siege of Saïo in the Ethiopian Highlands, later accepting Gazzera's surrender with 7,000 of his soldiers. Over the course of the campaign in Abyssinia, the Force Publique received the surrender of nine Italian generals, 370 ranking officers and 15,000 Italian colonial troops before the end of 1941. Some 500 Congolese soldiers and 4 Belgian officers were killed during the campaign.

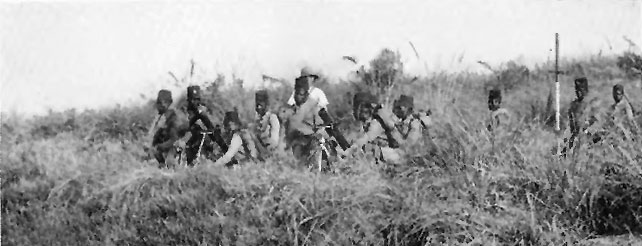
Force Publique setting up mortars in Italian East Africa, c. 1941.

After the Allied victory in Abyssinia, the Force Publique was redesignated the 1st Belgian Colonial Motorised Brigade and served as a garrison in Egypt and in British Palestine between 1943 and 1944. 13,000 Congolese soldiers also served in Nigeria as a garrison force.

Despite its military success during the conflict, the Force Publique was vulnerable to internal agitation. In 1944, a Force Publique garrison in the town of Luluabourg mutinied against their white officers.

A medical unit from the Congo, the 10th (Belgian Congo) Casualty Clearing Station, was created in 1943 and served alongside British forces in the Far East during the Burma campaign. The unit included 350 African and 20 European personnel and continued to serve with the British until 1945.

== Special Operations Executive ==
Numerous Belgians served as secret agents for the Allies within "T Section" of the Special Operations Executive (SOE). Agents were parachuted into occupied Belgium to liaise with the resistance from October 1940. Many were civilians from professional backgrounds rather than soldiers. It was exceptionally risky and of around 300 agents parachuted into Belgium, 75% were captured by the German Gestapo. Those captured were liable for torture or execution and 150 agents were killed.

== Uniforms and equipment ==
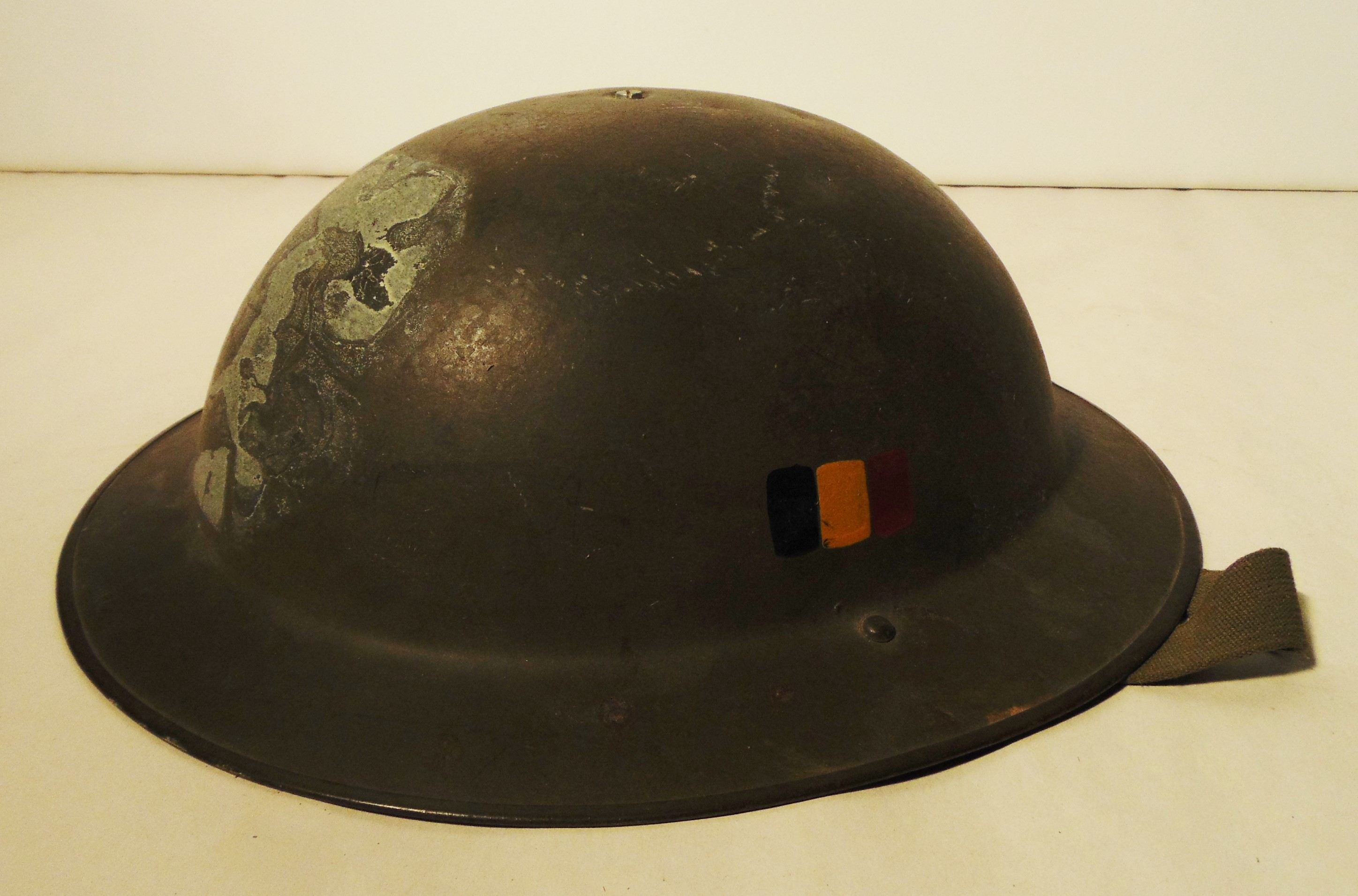
A British "Tommy Helmet", with an added Belgian flag, in the collection of the Nationaal Bevrijdingsmuseum in the Netherlands

Unlike the Free French, whose army retained their national rank structure and much of its own equipment and uniforms, the Free Belgians were fully organized and equipped along British lines. Belgian troops adopted the British rank structure along with British Battle Dress uniforms and helmets. They were distinguished from other units by a rampant lion cap badge and a curved cloth badge inscribed "BELGIUM" worn on one shoulder, and a Belgian tricolor badge on the other.

The Belgian army had traditionally used French-style uniforms, along with the characteristic Adrian helmet, meaning that from the First World War both armies had a very similar appearance. After the war, influenced by the Free Belgians and by British military advisors, the Belgian military instead adopted British-style uniforms and British-produced equipment.

== Legacy ==
The Free Belgian forces formed the core of the post-war Belgian army. The Brigade Piron, expanded and renamed "Liberation" Regiment, formed the core of the Belgian army of occupation in Germany. The Free Belgian special forces formed the basis for the creation of the 1st Commando Regiment, and the 1st Parachute Regiment which even kept the "Who Dares Wins" motto of the SAS.

The history of the Free Belgian forces continues to be celebrated within Belgium. The Belgian Marine Component, for example, still operates a ship named Godetia. There are numerous memorials to the participation of the Free Belgians forces in the liberation across the country and in areas liberated by the Free Belgians. The participation of soldiers from the Belgian Congo was, however, largely forgotten following Congolese independence in 1960 and decades of subsequent war, though in recent years the profile of the veterans has been raised by exhibitions creating greater public awareness.

== See also ==
- Belgian Fusilier Battalions
- Belgian Resistance
- Belgian prisoners of war in World War II
- Free French Forces
- Belgian government in exile
- Belgium in World War II
