= Sint-Pieters =

Quarter of the city of Bruges, Belgium

- Quarter of Bruges
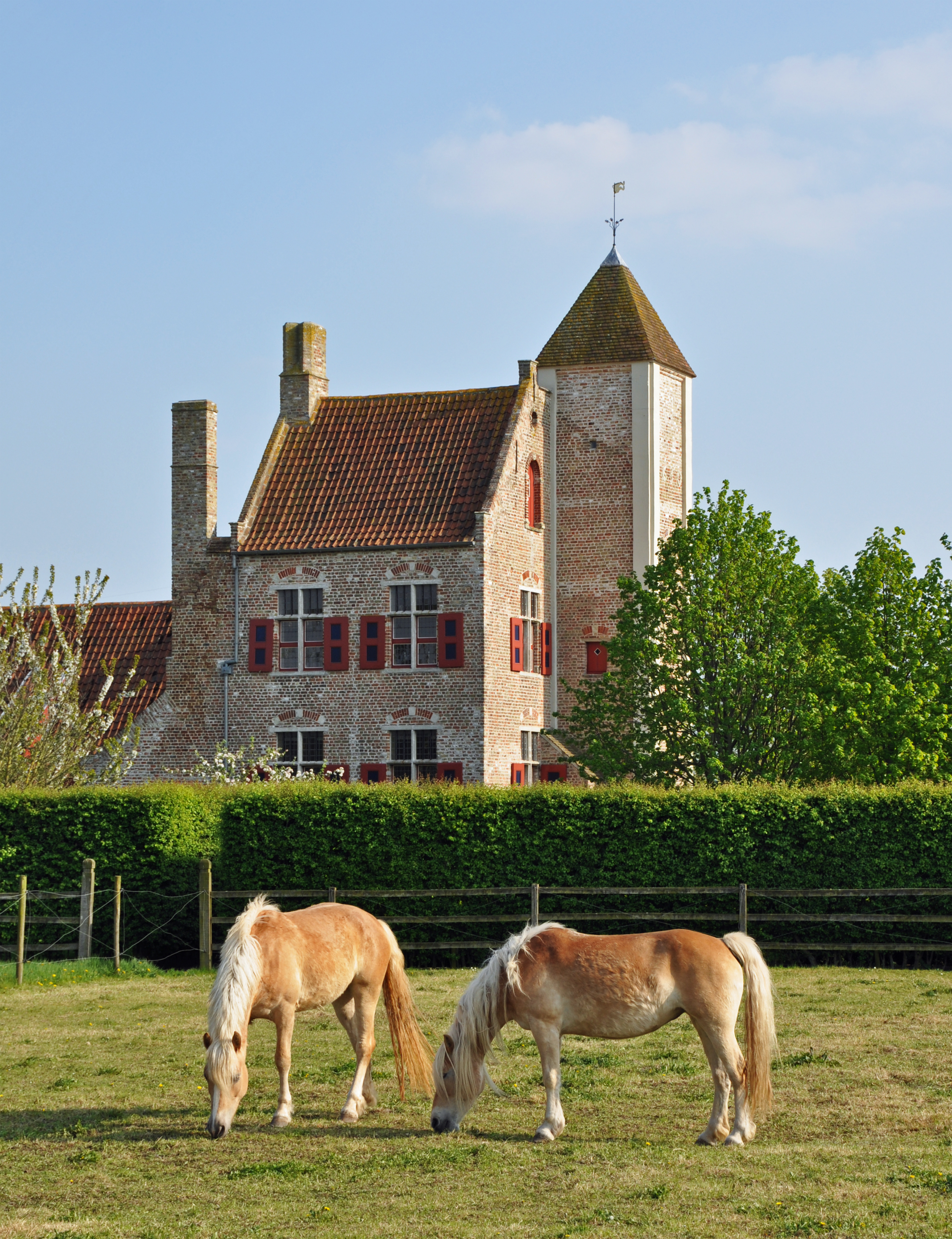

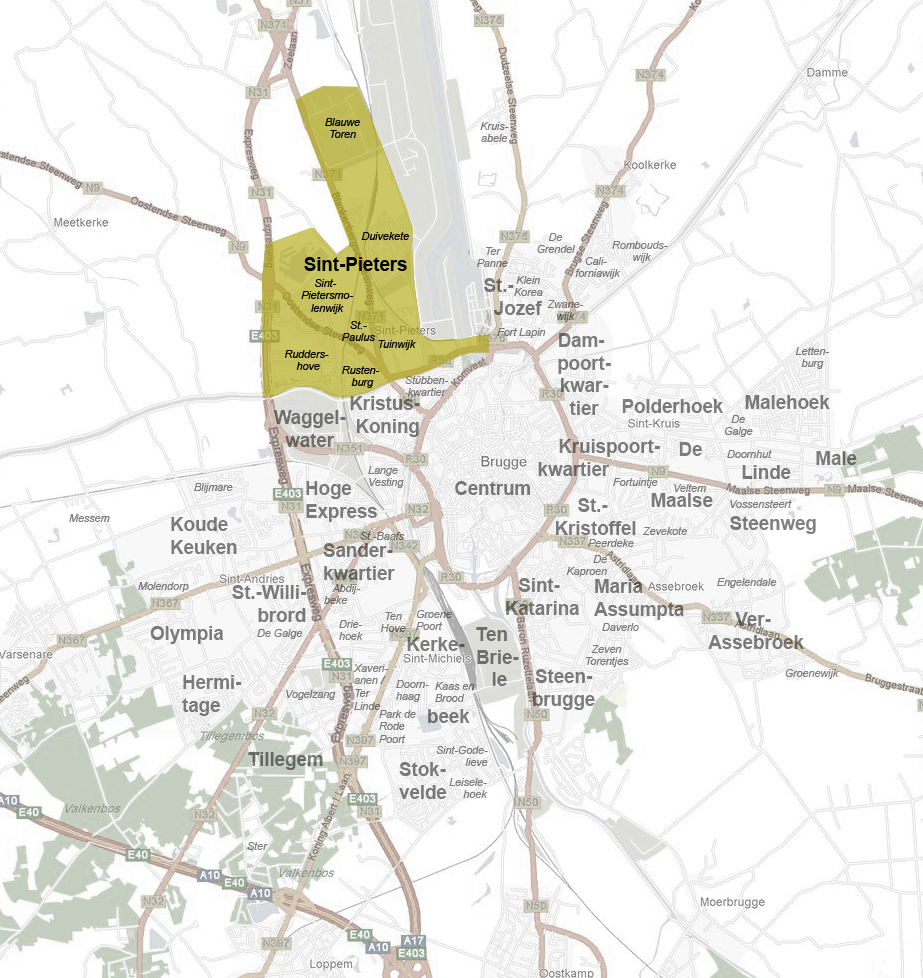
- Location of Sint-Pieters in Bruges
- Interactive map of Sint-Pieters
- Location within Belgium Location within West Flanders
- Coordinates: 51°13′52″N 3°12′29″E
- Country: Belgium
- Community: Flemish Community
- Region: Flemish Region
- Province: West Flanders
- Arrondissement: Bruges
- Municipality: Bruges

Area
  - Total: 13.7 km^{2} (5.3 sq mi)

Population (2014-12-31)
  - Total: 7,550
  - Density: 551/km^{2} (1,430/sq mi)
- Postal codes: 8000
- Area codes: 050

Sint-Pieters (Dutch pronunciation: [sɪnt ˈpitərs]; French: Saint-Pierre, pronounced [sɛ̃ pjɛʁ]), sometimes also called Sint-Pieters-op-den-Dijk (Dutch pronunciation: [sɪnt ˈpitərs ʔɔb dɛn ˈdɛik]; French: Saint-Pierre-sur-la-Digue, pronounced [sɛ̃ pjɛʁ syʁ la diɡ]; lit. 'Saint Peter on the Dike'), is a quarter of Bruges, in the province of West Flanders, Belgium. It was a separate municipality until 1899. In 1899, it was merged into Bruges.

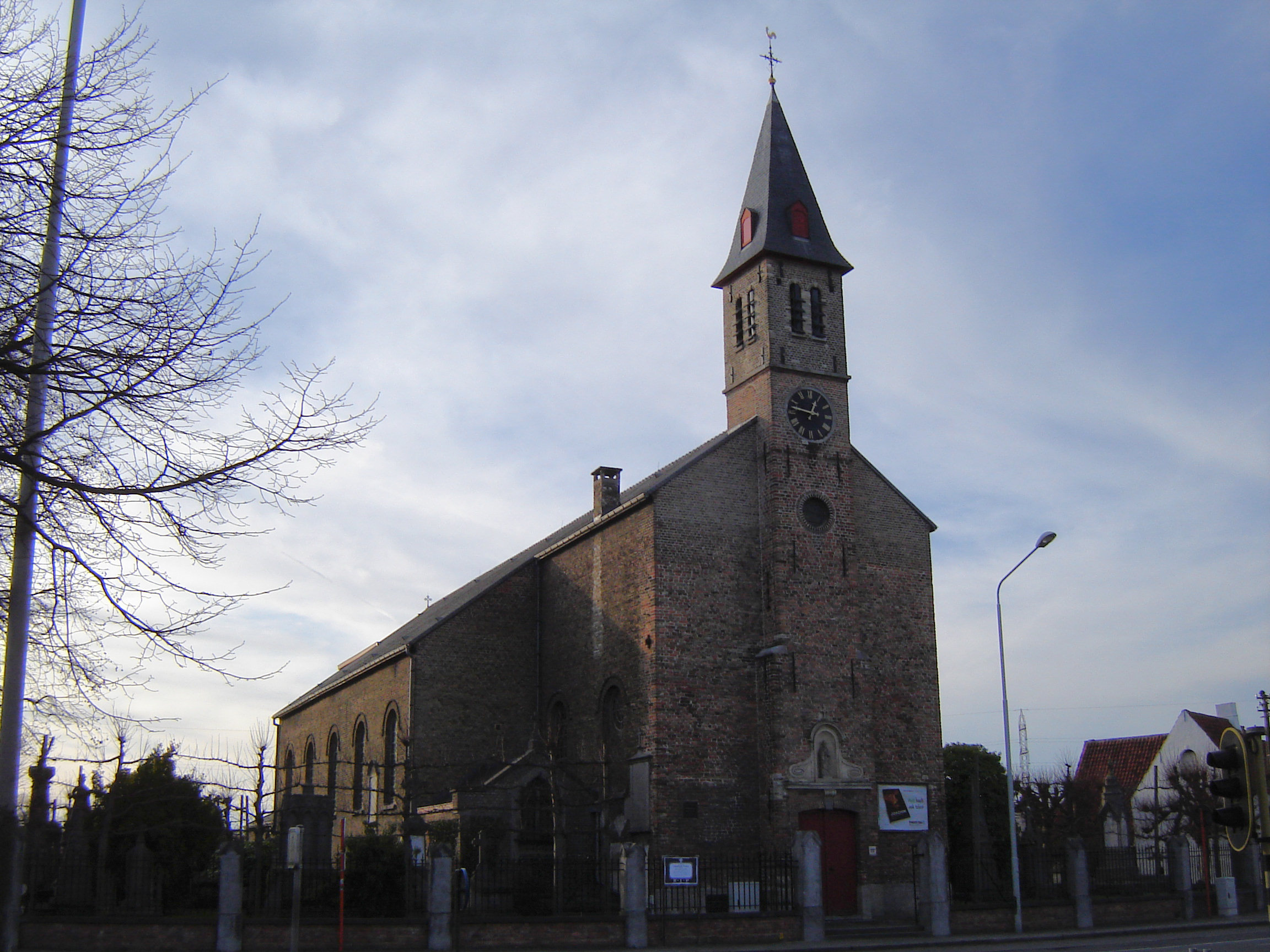
St. Peter's church

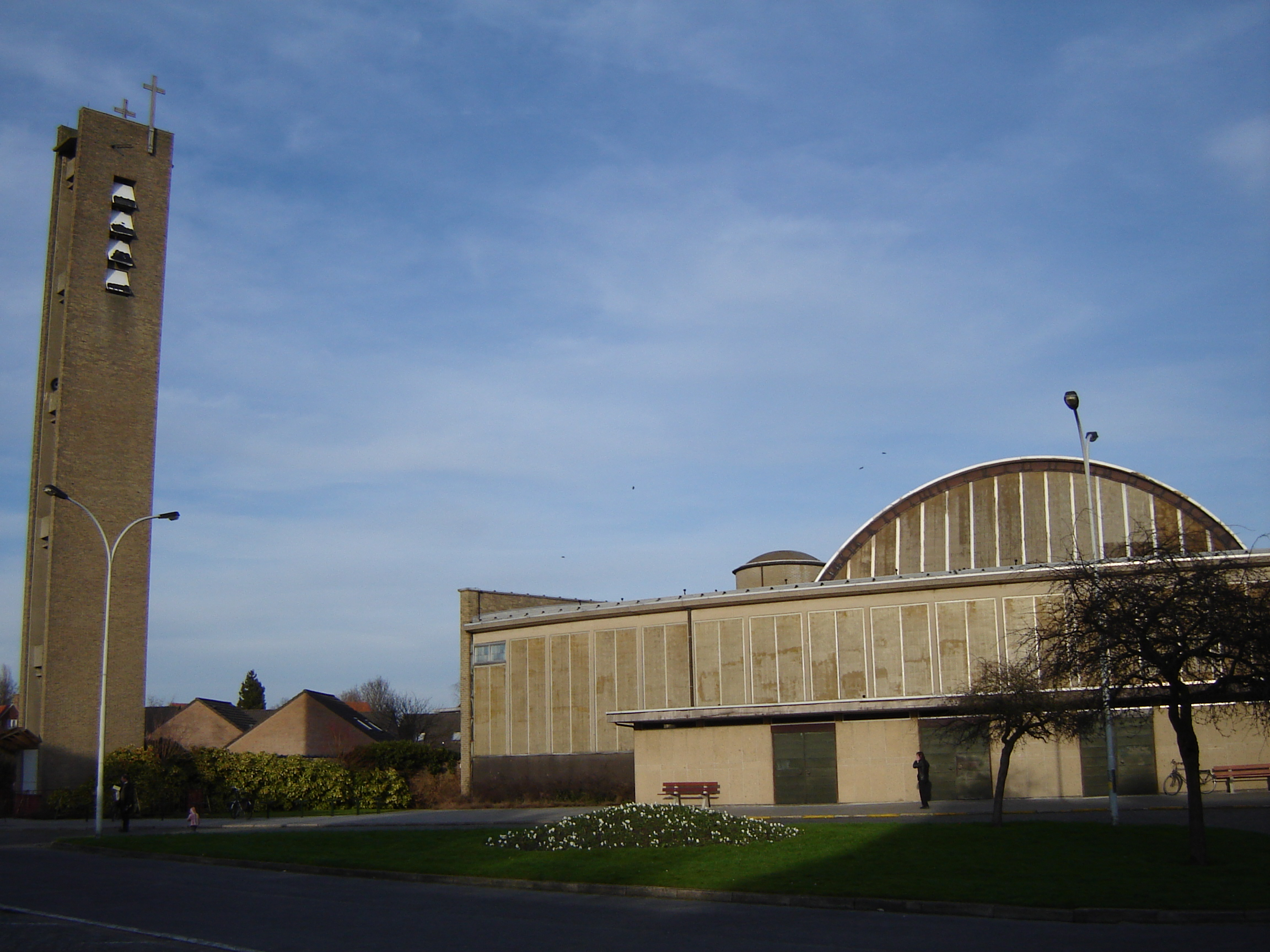
St. Paul's church
