= Dietrich Bürkel =

German politician

Member of the Bundestag
- In office 6 October 1953 – 6 October 1957

Personal details
- Born: 2 January 1905 Mönchengladbach
- Died: 25 December 1986 (aged 81)
- Party: CDU

Dietrich Bürkel (2 January 1905 – 25 December 1986) was a German politician of the Christian Democratic Union (CDU) and former member of the German Bundestag.

== Life ==
He was a member of the German Bundestag from 1953 to 1957. He had entered parliament via the state list of the CDU North Rhine-Westphalia.

== Literature ==
Herbst, Ludolf; Jahn, Bruno (2002). Vierhaus, Rudolf (ed.). Biographisches Handbuch der Mitglieder des Deutschen Bundestages. 1949–2002 [Biographical Handbook of the Members of the German Bundestag. 1949–2002] (in German). München: De Gruyter - De Gruyter Saur. p. 1715. ISBN 978-3-11-184511-1.
