= Charge of Burkel =

Skirmish in World War One

Coordinates: 51.1837°N 3.3932°E

Cavalry charge of Burkel
- Part of the Battle of Courtrai (Hundred Days Offensive) in World War I
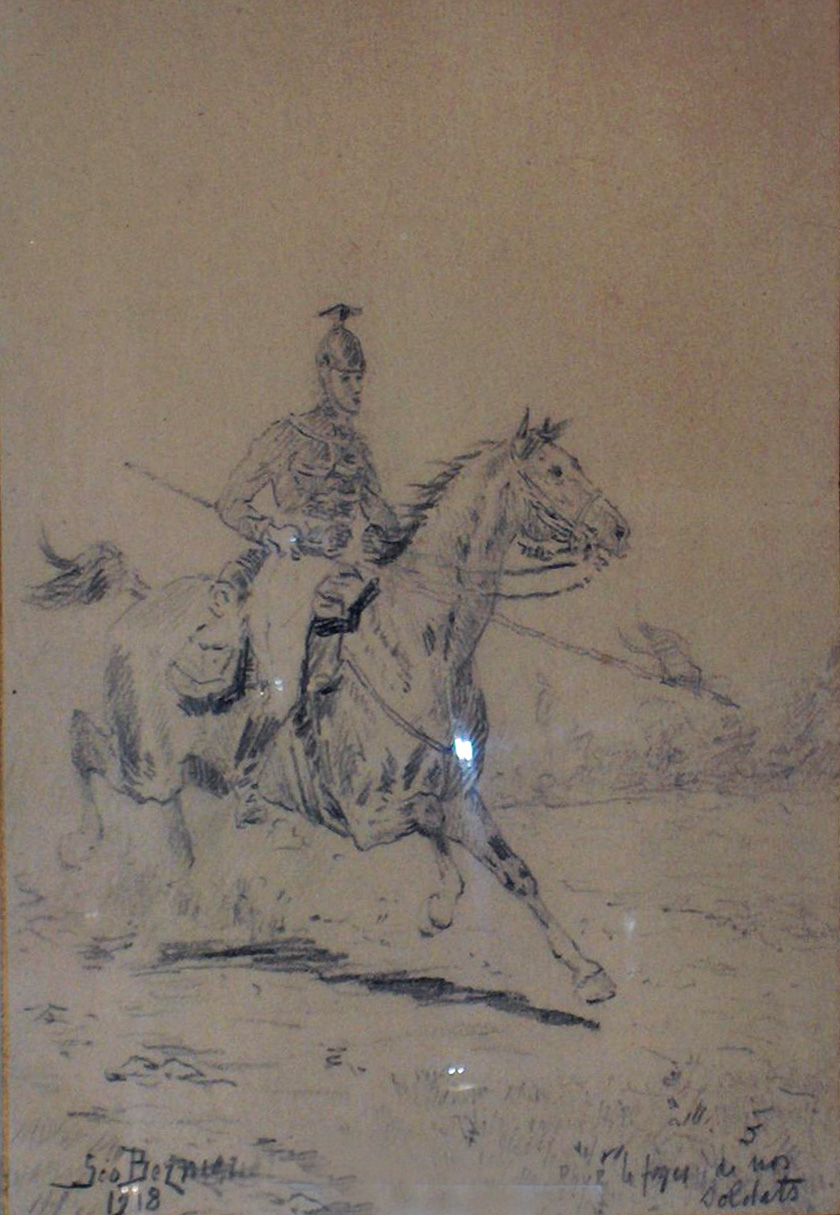
- Illustration of a Belgian cavalryman, 1918.
Date	19 October 1918
Location	Between Oedelem and Maldegem, Belgium
Result	Belgian victory

Belligerents
Belgium	German Empire

Commanders and leaders
(Belgium) Colonel Jooris (Belgium) Victor van Strydonck	(German Empire) Unknown

Units involved
1st Regiment of Guides	

Casualties and losses
Unknown	Unknown

The cavalry charge of Burkel (French: Charge de Burkel, Dutch: Slag bij Burkel) was a skirmish between Belgian and German forces on 19 October 1918, during the closing stages of World War I. It is notable as the last cavalry charge in Western Europe.

== Background ==
The Belgian Cavalry Division was stationed on the Western Front as an infantry formation, with its horses kept near the front for supply purposes.

By October 1918, the Belgian army was advancing back into territory that it had lost in 1914 and the German front line began a fighting withdrawal eastwards. By the 18 October, the 5th Belgian Division had reached Bruges and the 7th Belgian Infantry Division had captured Oostkamp. The Cavalry Division, which had been ordered to attack Eeklo, was held back by the destruction of bridges at Ruddervoorde, and was instead ordered to take up position behind the 1st Belgian Infantry Division slightly west of Ruddervoorde. During the night of 18/19 October, the Germans began to retreat rapidly from the sector, covered by battalion-sized rear-guards. The Cavalry Division, formed into two columns, was ordered to pursue the retreating Germans in the direction of Eeklo.

== The Charge ==
The northern column of the Cavalry Division advanced towards Eeklo, but its advance stalled when it found itself under attack from the German rear-guard near Burkel and was forced to dismount and fight back.

In the afternoon of the 19 October, Major Victor Van Strydonck in command of two squadrons of the 1st Regiment of Guides received orders to "cross the enemy lines by surprise. Once arrived at Burkel, attack the enemy from behind..."

The first group of the regiment, under Colonel Jooris, was stopped by machine gun fire and was forced to continue the battle on foot, calling on artillery fire to help create a breach.

After advancing in silence, the cavalry charged the German rear-guard in the forest of Burkel at 16:30, to the cry of "Forward, my children! For the king!" The charge was headed by two armoured cars. The first line of trenches was overwhelmed, allowing the cavalry to ride more than three kilometers further before confronting the second line of German machine guns, which they also captured and occupied. As the armoured cars had been immobilized, the cavalry were ordered to attack the second line of machine guns on foot. By 17:00, the Germans, who had been taken off balance by the charge, began to retreat across the sector.

== Aftermath ==
The charge was celebrated in Belgium and the battle honour "Burkel" added to the standard of the 1st Guides. Van Strydonck, who had commanded the charge, was made a Baron and given the title "de Burkel" in recognition of his heroism. During the Second World War, he would serve as commander of the Free Belgian Forces in the United Kingdom.
