= Victor van Strydonck de Burkel =

Belgian army officer

Baron van Strydonck de Burkel
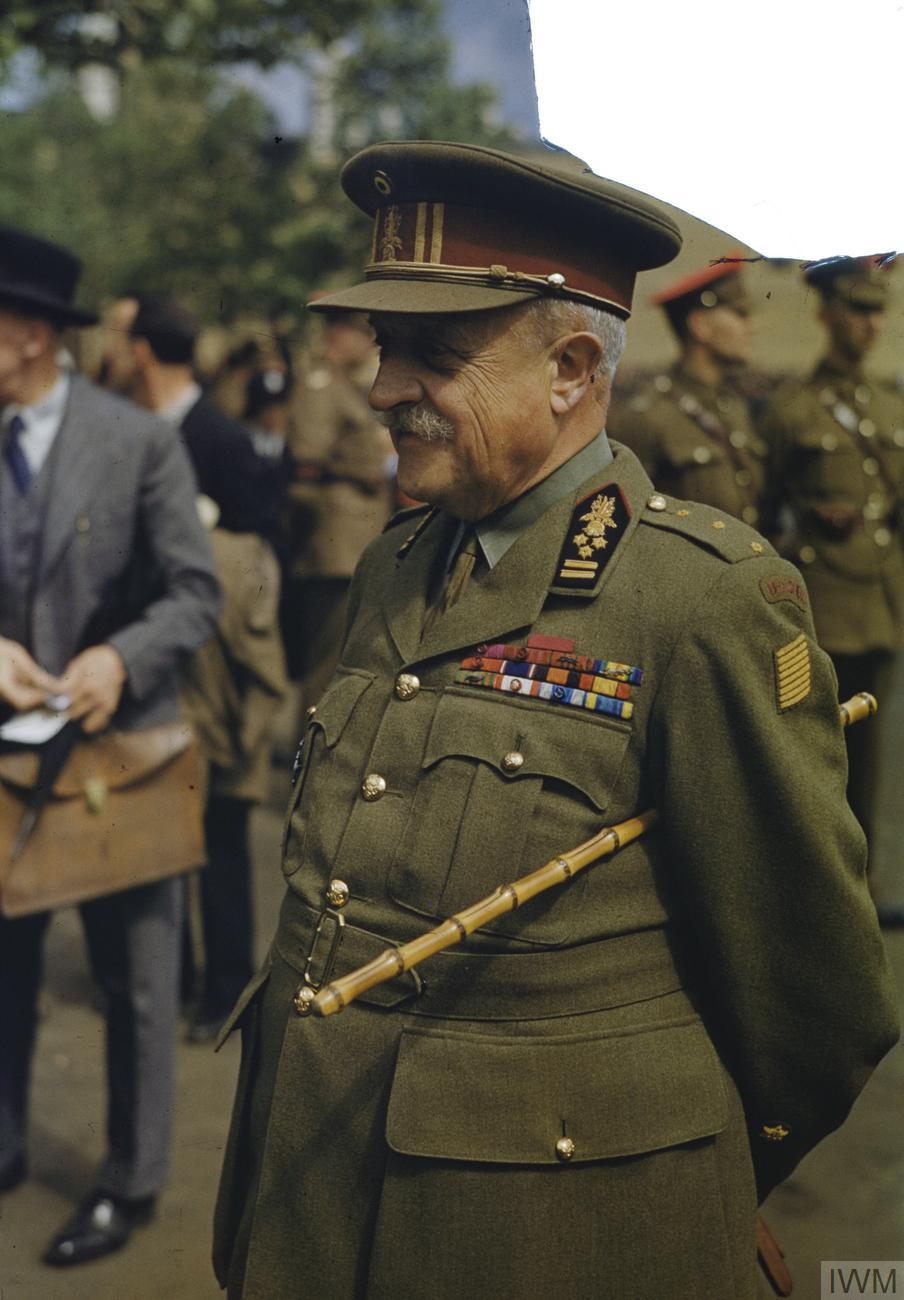
- General van Strydonck de Burkel in London, 1943
- Born: Victor Jean Clement van Strydonck; 16 July 1876; Antwerp, Belgium
- Died: 4 August 1961 (aged 85); Etterbeek, Belgium
- Military career
- Branch: Belgian Army
- Rank: General
- Commands: Chief of the Belgian Military Mission to Supreme Headquarters Allied Expeditionary Force
- Conflicts: World War I; Charge of Burkel; World War II

Lieutenant-general BEM Victor Jean Clement, Baron van Strydonck de Burkel (Note: In Dutch, his surname can also be rendered with an IJ digraph as in "van Strijdonck de Burkel".) (16 July 1876, Antwerp – 4 August 1961, Etterbeek) (Note: Dates provided by Dr. Pierre Lierneux of the Belgian Museum of the Army on 24 June 2009. Some sources incorrectly give 1953 as his year of death.) was a general of the Belgian Army and the primary architect of the formation of the Free Belgian Forces after Belgium's official surrender on May 28, 1940 in World War II.

== Military career ==
=== First World War and Interwar ===
In 1918, as an officer in the 1st Regiment of Guides, Victor van Strydonck commanded the last cavalry charge in western Europe, the successful Charge of Burkel. For his role in the charge, van Strydonck was made a baron and given the title "de Burkel" in 1937 after the location of the battle.

A cavalry officer, van Strydonck de Burkel commanded the Cavalry School (1920–1923) and the 1st Cavalry Division (1928–1933), served as the inspector-general of the Belgian Gendarmerie (1933–1939), and was the commander of the Cavalry Corps (1933–1939) prior to World War II. In 1938, Van Strydonck announced his retirement from the army but was re-activated in late 1939 when war between Britain, France and Germany broke out although Belgium remained neutral.

=== Second World War ===
During the invasion of Belgium by Germany in May 1940, van Strydonck de Burkel commanded the 1st Military Zone. At his own initiative, Van Strydonck created a camp in Tenby, Wales where he established a Camp militaire belge de Regroupment (CMBR) for Belgian soldiers who had escaped to Britain after the surrender. Initially, morale among the several hundred soldiers was extremely low among the troops in Tenby and drunkenness and insubordination presented a major problem. Van Strydonck lobbied the British to improve the conditions and, to keep the soldiers busy, organized a major parade on Belgian National Day (21 July) 1941. He succeeded in affiliating the Belgian contingent with the local Home Guard which improved morale.

With the arrival of the Belgian government in exile and the formal creation of the Free Belgian Forces, he became the Commander in Chief and presided over the gradual organization of the 1st Belgian Infantry Brigade, a unit that later fought in the campaign in northwestern Europe. In 1941 he became the Inspector-General of the Belgian ground forces in Great Britain.

After the Allies re-entered northwestern Europe in 1944, van Strydonck de Burkel became the Chief of the Belgian Military Mission to Supreme Headquarters Allied Expeditionary Force (SHAEF).

== Bibliography ==
- Bernard, Henri (1988). "Van Strydonck de Burkel, Victor (1876–1961)". Nouvelle Biographie Nationale. Vol. 1. Brussels: Académie royale de Belgique. pp. 359–6.
- De Vos, Luc (2001). "The Reconstruction of Belgian Military Forces in Britain, 1940-1945". In Conway, Martin; Gotovitch, José (eds.). Europe in exile : European exile communities in Britain 1940-45 (1st ed.). New York: Berghahn. pp. 81–99. ISBN 1-57181-503-1.
- Decat, Frank (2007). De Belgen in Engeland 40/45: de Belgische strijdkrachten in Groot-Brittannië tijdens WOII. Tielt: Lannoo. ISBN 978-90-209-6981-8.
- Grosbois, Thierry (2007). Pierlot, 1930–1950. Brussels: Racine. ISBN 978-2873864859.
- Keegan, John, ed. (2001). "Strydonck de Burkel, General Victor van". Who's Who in World War II. Abingdon: Routledge. p. 151. ISBN 9781107612334.

Belgian nobility
New creation	Baron van Strydonck de Burkel; 1937 – 4 August 1961	Succeeded by Yves van Strydonck de Burkel
