= HMS Buttercup (K193) =

Royal Navy Flower-class corvette

- HMS Buttercup under Belgian command

History

United Kingdom
- Name: Buttercup
- Namesake: Buttercup
- Ordered: 8 April 1940
- Builder: Harland & Wolff Ltd., Belfast, Northern Ireland
- Laid down: 17 December 1940
- Launched: 10 April 1941
- Commissioned: 24 April 1942
- Decommissioned: December 1944
- Out of service: 23 May 1941
- Reinstated: Returned to the Royal Navy
- Fate: Scrapped in 1969

Belgium
- Name: HMS Buttercup
- Acquired: 23 May 1941
- Out of service: Late 1944
- Fate: Returned to the Royal Navy

Norway
- Name: Nordkyn
- Acquired: 20 December 1944 (bought 1946)
- Decommissioned: 9 April 1956
- Fate: Sold November 1957

History

Norway
- Name: Thoris
- Owner: Thorendahl Ltd.
- Acquired: 1957
- Fate: Sold and broken up 1969

General characteristics
- Class & type: Flower-class corvette

HMS Buttercup (pennant number: K193) was a Flower-class corvette built for the Royal Navy. She served during the Second World War first as part of the Royal Navy Section Belge (RNSB), and then later as part of the Royal Norwegian Navy. Between 1946 and 1957 she served as HNoMS Nordyn. The Norwegian government then sold her and she became the whaler Thoris until she was broken up in 1969.

== Belgian service ==
Buttercup was the first of two corvettes to serve with the Royal Navy Section Belge (RNSB) of the Free Belgian forces, along with HMS Godetia. With the liberation of Belgium in late 1944, Buttercup returned to Royal Navy control.

== Norwegian service ==
From 20 December 1944, the Royal Norwegian Navy borrowed Buttercup to replace the Castle-class corvette HNoMS Tunsberg Castle, which had been lost to a mine on 12 December 1944 off the coast of Finnmark.

HNoMS Buttercup served from 15 February 1945 until 8 May as part of the Liverpool Escort Force. As part of "Group B2" she participated in two westbound and two eastbound allied transatlantic convoys. None of these was attacked by enemy forces and all the convoys arrived at their destinations.

When Buttercup got back to Liverpool on 6 May she was ordered to Rosyth to prepare to sail for Norway. She sailed on 13 May 1945 for Oslo carrying the Chief of Staff of the Navy High Command and other naval officers. She arrived at Oslo on 15 May.

The Norwegian Government acquired Buttercup in 1946 and on 10 August renamed her HNoMS Nordkyn. She served initially as a fisheries protection vessel.

Nordkyn, Kommandor Oscar Hauge, sailed from Tromsø on 28 July 1948 for Svalbard. She was carrying Kaptein Rolf von Krogh on an expedition for the Norsk Polarinstitut. She carried out a hydrographic survey between Bear Island (Bjørnøya), and Spitsbergen. Between 2 and 9 September Nordkyn served as a base for a Catalina that the Polarinstitut employed for mapping glacier fronts. Nordkyn returned to Tromsø on 18 September.

In 1950 Nordkyn was reclassified as a frigate and received the pennant number F309. She was stricken from the Navy list on 9 April 1956 at Horten.

== Whaler ==
In November 1957 the Norwegian Government sold Nordkyn to Thor Dahl A/S, Sandefjord, a whaling company. Her new owners had Framnæs Mekaniske Værksted rebuild her, renamed her Thoris, and employed her as a whaler in the Antarctic where she worked with Thor Dahl's whale factory ship.

== Fate ==
Thoris was sold in June 1969 for scrapping at Grimstad.
