= Heinrich Bürkle de la Camp =

Heinrich Bürkle de la Camp (born 3 June 1895 in Bonndorf; died 2 May 1974 in Dottingen) was a German medic and army doctor with the rank of general.

== Life ==
Bürkle de la Camp's domains were surgery and accident surgery, he wrote many reference books about these themes.

From 1933 till 1962 he was head of the surgery department in the Bergbau-Berufsgenossenschaftlichen Krankenanstalten Bergmannsheil (today: Berufsgenossenschaftliches Universitätsklinikum Bergmannsheil GmbH) in Bochum. In this time he invented an equipment that made blood transfusion easier and safer.

In his honour the German Bundeswehr awards the Heinrich-Bürkle-de-la-Camp-Medaille for merits in medicine. The plaza in front of the Bergmannsheil, the hospital he worked in, is named after him.

== Leadership roles ==
- Präsident of Deutschen Gesellschaft für Chirurgie (DGCH)
- Chairmanship in the Deutschen Gesellschaft für Unfallchirurgie (DGU)
