= Belgium in World War II =

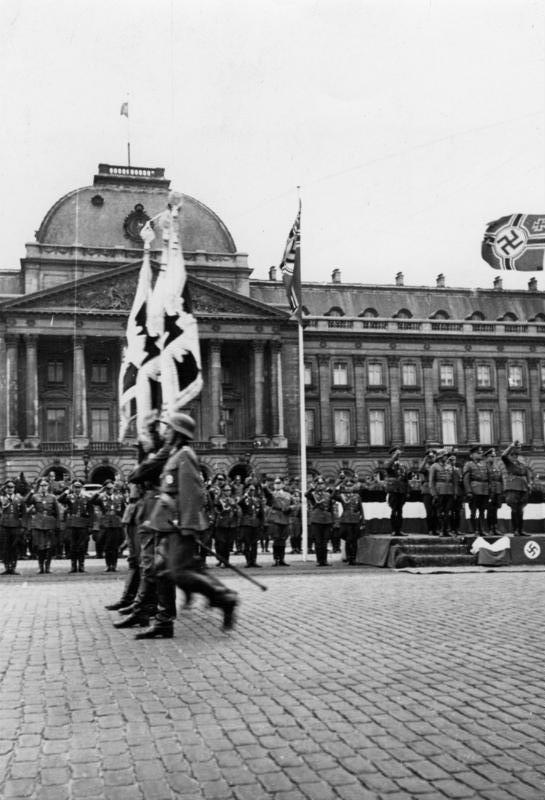
German soldiers parade past the Royal Palace in Brussels, 1940

Despite being neutral at the start of World War II, Belgium and its colonial possessions found themselves at war after the country was invaded by German forces on 10 May 1940. After 18 days of fighting, in which Belgian forces were pushed back into a small pocket in the north-west of the country, the Belgian military surrendered to the Germans, beginning an occupation that would endure until 1944. The surrender of 28 May was ordered by King Leopold III without the consultation of his government and sparked a political crisis after the war. Despite the capitulation, many Belgians managed to escape to the United Kingdom where they formed a government and army-in-exile on the Allied side.

The Belgian Congo remained loyal to the Belgian government in London and contributed significant material and human resources to the Allied cause. Many Belgians were involved in both armed and passive resistance to German forces, although many chose to collaborate with the German forces. Support from political factions and sections of the Belgian population allowed the German army to recruit two divisions of the Waffen-SS from Belgium and also facilitated the Nazi persecution of Belgian Jews in which nearly 25,000 were killed.

Most of the country was liberated by the Allies between September and October 1944, though areas in the far east of the country remained occupied until early 1945. In total, approximately 88,000 Belgians died during the conflict, a figure representing 1.05 percent of the country's pre-war population, and around 8 percent of the country's GDP was destroyed.

== Background ==
During the 1930s, Belgium was still recovering from the destruction of World War I. Economically, Belgium was experiencing high unemployment in the aftermath of the Great Depression of 1929, and by 1932 unemployment stood at 23.5 percent though under the "New Deal-style" Plan de Man this had been reduced to around 15 percent by 1937.

The 1930s also saw the growth of several authoritarian and fascist political parties in both Wallonia and Flanders. In the 1936 elections, one of these, the Rexist party, gained 11.6 percent of the national vote. By 1939 however, extremist parties lost many of the seats that they had previously gained in new elections and political stability seemed to be returning.

=== Neutrality ===
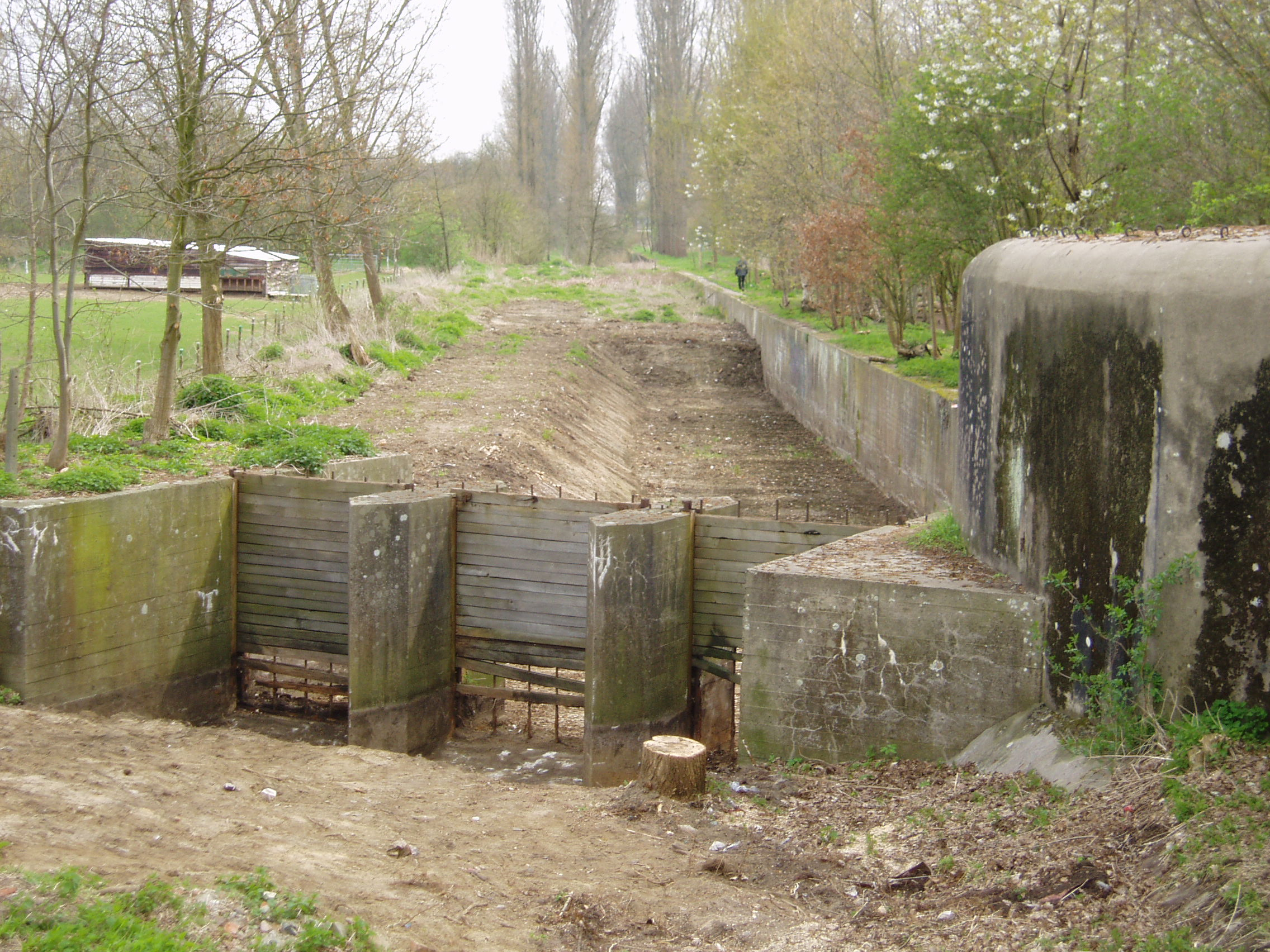
Bunkers and anti-tank defenses of the K-W Line along the River Dijle, built in late 1939

As Belgium had suffered so much damage in World War I, there was little appetite within the country to involve itself in any potential European conflict. In October 1936, King Leopold III announced that Belgium would remain neutral in the event of another war in Europe as part of what he termed an Independent Policy (Politique d'Indépendance). To this end, the Belgian government tried to steer a path away from alliances: leaving the Locarno Treaty, repudiating a defence pact with France signed in 1920 and receiving a guarantee of neutrality from Nazi Germany in 1937.

The German Government considers that the inviolability and integrity of Belgium are common interests of the Western Powers. It confirms its determination that in no circumstances will it impair this inviolability and integrity and that it will at all times respect Belgian territory ...

— German guarantee of neutrality, 13 October 1937

During this period, the Belgian military was reorganized as an exclusively defensive force and began construction and modernization of fortifications around the country, particularly around Liège Province near the German border.

On the declaration of war between the United Kingdom, France, and Germany in September 1939, the Belgian government launched a crash re-armament program, augmenting the national defenses by creating the K-W Line linking the National Redoubt at Antwerp with the south along the River Dijle, just behind the main Fortified Position of Liège.

== 18 Days' Campaign ==
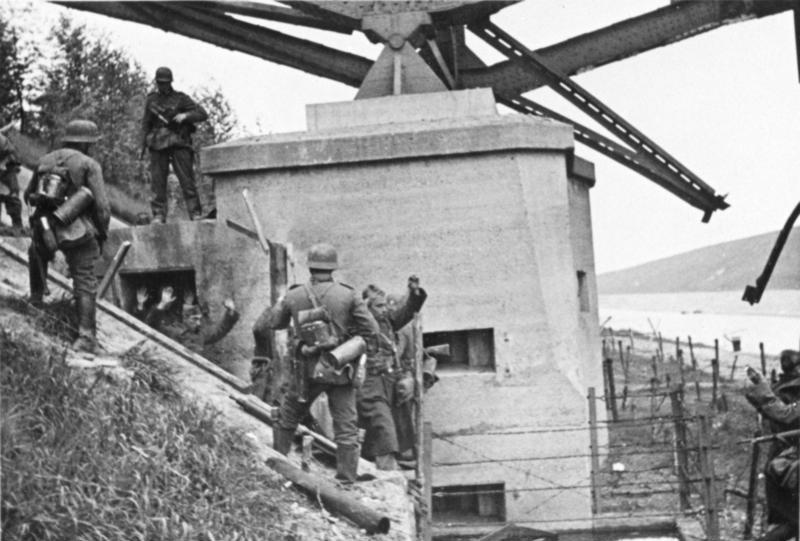
Belgian soldiers surrender to German paratroopers after the Battle of Fort Eben-Emael, 11 May 1940

With the German invasion of Poland in September 1939, although still following a policy of neutrality, the Belgian government began general mobilization. By 1940, the army numbered between 600,000 and 650,000 men (nearly 20 percent of the male population of Belgium) making it approximately four times larger than the British Expeditionary Force and twice as large as the Dutch army at the time.

The invasion of Belgium by Nazi Germany started on 10 May 1940, under the codename Fall Gelb ("Case Yellow") as part of the wider invasion of France, the Netherlands and Luxembourg. The Belgian Albert Canal fortifications, some of the most modern defensive networks in Europe, proved almost useless. At Eben-Emael, the fort held by 1,200 Belgians was taken when the Germans deployed 500 glider-borne Fallschirmjäger against them, opening the border for Blitzkrieg-style warfare. Almost all of the air force's modern Hurricane fighters were also destroyed by the Luftwaffe on the ground at Schaffen airfield on 10 May.

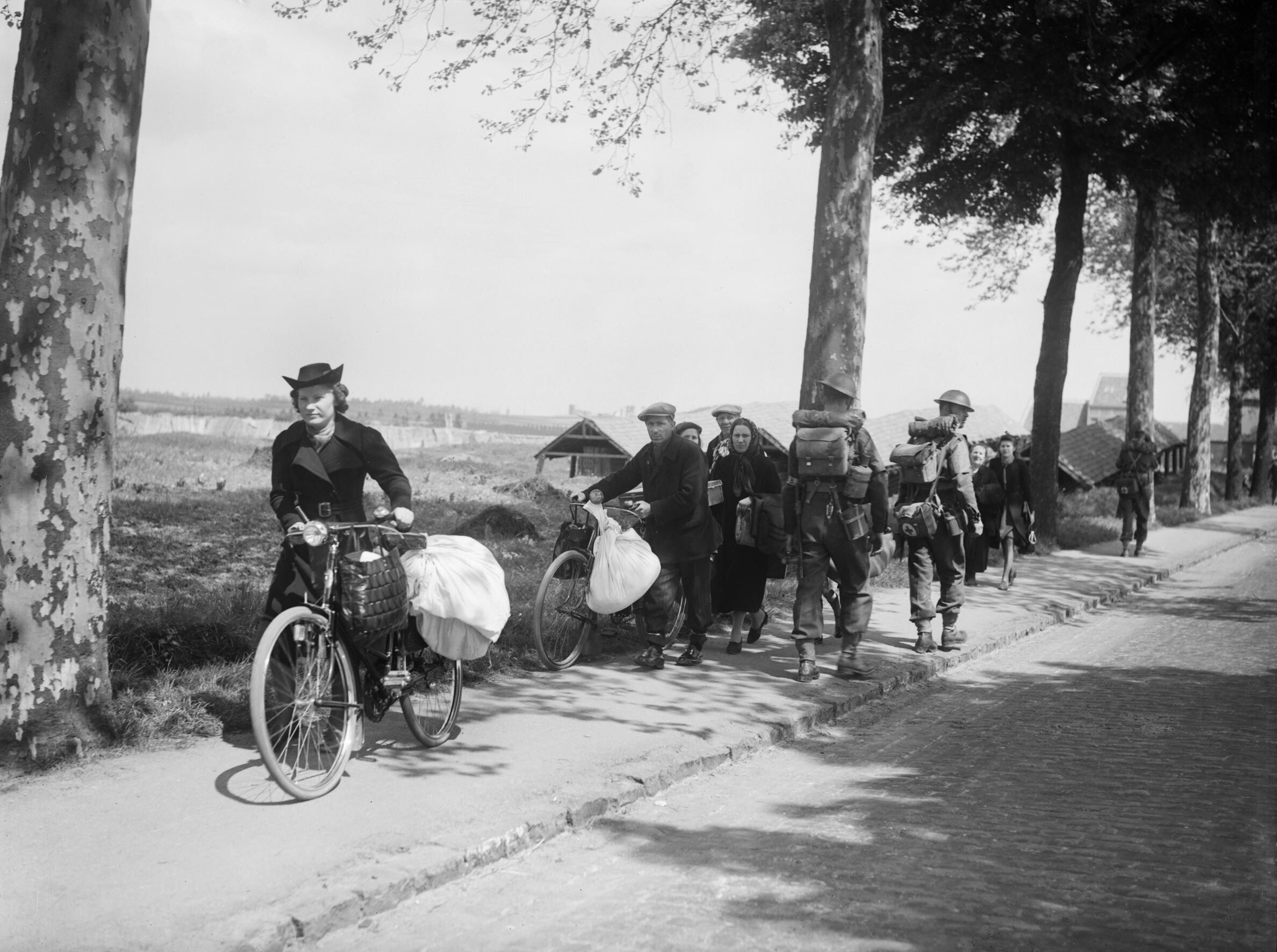
Belgian civilians fleeing westwards away from the advancing German army, 12 May 1940

The German breakthrough at Sedan, which had been thought impassable, meant that defenders of the K-W Line risked being outflanked, and had to withdraw on 16 May. The German invasion triggered a panic amongst Belgian civilians in the path of the advancing German army. By 11 May, the roads leading westwards, away from the fighting, were blocked by refugees, hampering the eastward advance of French and British forces. It is estimated that around two million civilians fled their homes during the campaign.

The government's policy of neutrality had left Belgium with an outdated and ill-equipped army and air force. Above all, the army possessed only 16 battle tanks (Note: 16 tanks of the French Renault ACG-1 type were in service in 1940, in addition to 270 other armoured vehicles, mostly of the lightly armoured T-13 and T-15 types.) between its two cavalry divisions for political reasons as they had been considered too "aggressive" for the army of a neutral power. The air force, hurriedly reorganised in May 1940, was taken by surprise and could only field 180 serviceable aircraft out of its total of 234.

The military held out against German forces for 18 days, against overwhelming odds. On 28 May, forced into a small pocket along the Leie river and after failed attempts to broker a ceasefire on the 27th, the Belgian king and military surrendered unconditionally. Belgian casualties during the campaign numbered some 6,000 killed and 15,850 wounded. Some 112,500 French and Belgian troops escaped to the UK via Dunkirk but the majority of the Belgian survivors were made prisoners of war and many were not released until the end of the war.

With the surrender of the Belgian army, the government, led by Hubert Pierlot, fled first to Paris and formed a government in exile in Bordeaux. After the Fall of France, the government transferred to Eaton Square, London.

=== Surrender of Leopold III ===
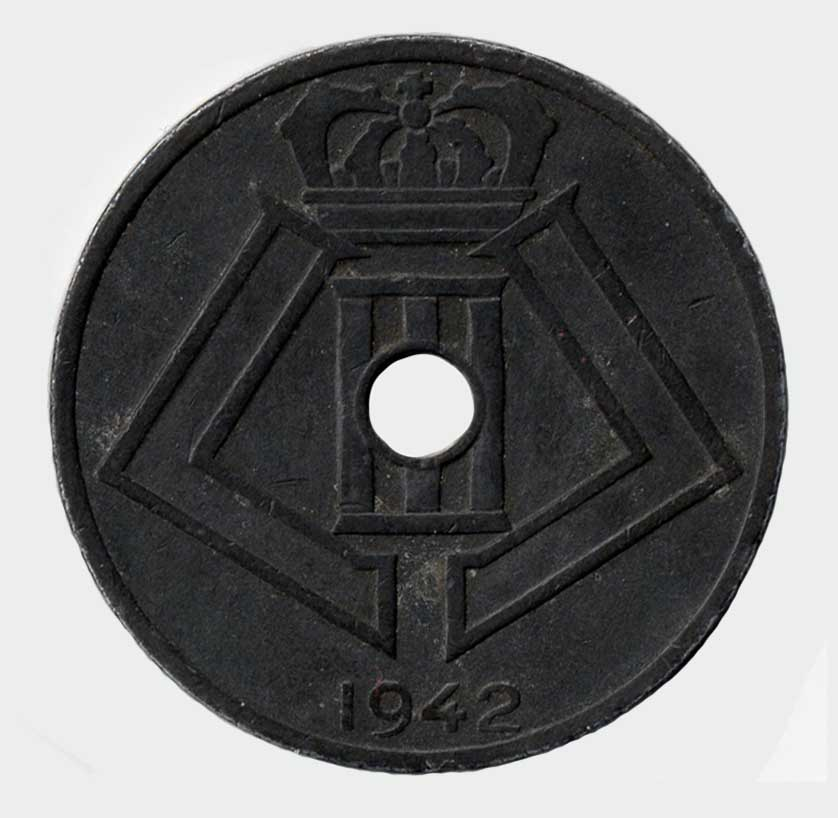
A Belgian coin with the monogram of Leopold III, minted during the occupation.

Leopold III, king and commander in chief of the Belgian army, surrendered personally to German forces on 28 May, contrary to the advice of Pierlot's government, having personally decided that the Allied cause was lost. His decision was fiercely criticized by the French prime minister, Paul Reynaud and by Pierlot in a radio broadcast on 28 June 1940, where he declared Leopold's decision to be "an event without precedent in history".

The king remained in Belgium during the war as a German prisoner while the government went into exile and continued military action in the Allied cause. Unlike the Netherlands and Luxembourg where the monarchy was repressed or had joined the government in exile, Leopold III remained prominent in the occupied territory, and coins and stamps produced during the occupation continued to carry his face or monogram. Nevertheless, Leopold remained a focus for resistance, his position explained by the slogan "Belgium is captive! Long live Belgium! The King is captive! Long live the King!" While imprisoned, he sent a letter to Adolf Hitler in 1942 which has been credited with saving an estimated 500,000 Belgian women and children from forced deportation to munitions factories in Germany. In November 1940, Leopold visited Hitler in Berchtesgaden where he asked for Belgian prisoners of war to be freed.

After the war, allegations that Leopold's surrender had been an act of collaboration provoked a political crisis, known as the Royal Question, about whether he could return to the throne, which ultimately ended with his abdication.

== German occupation ==
=== Life in occupied Belgium ===
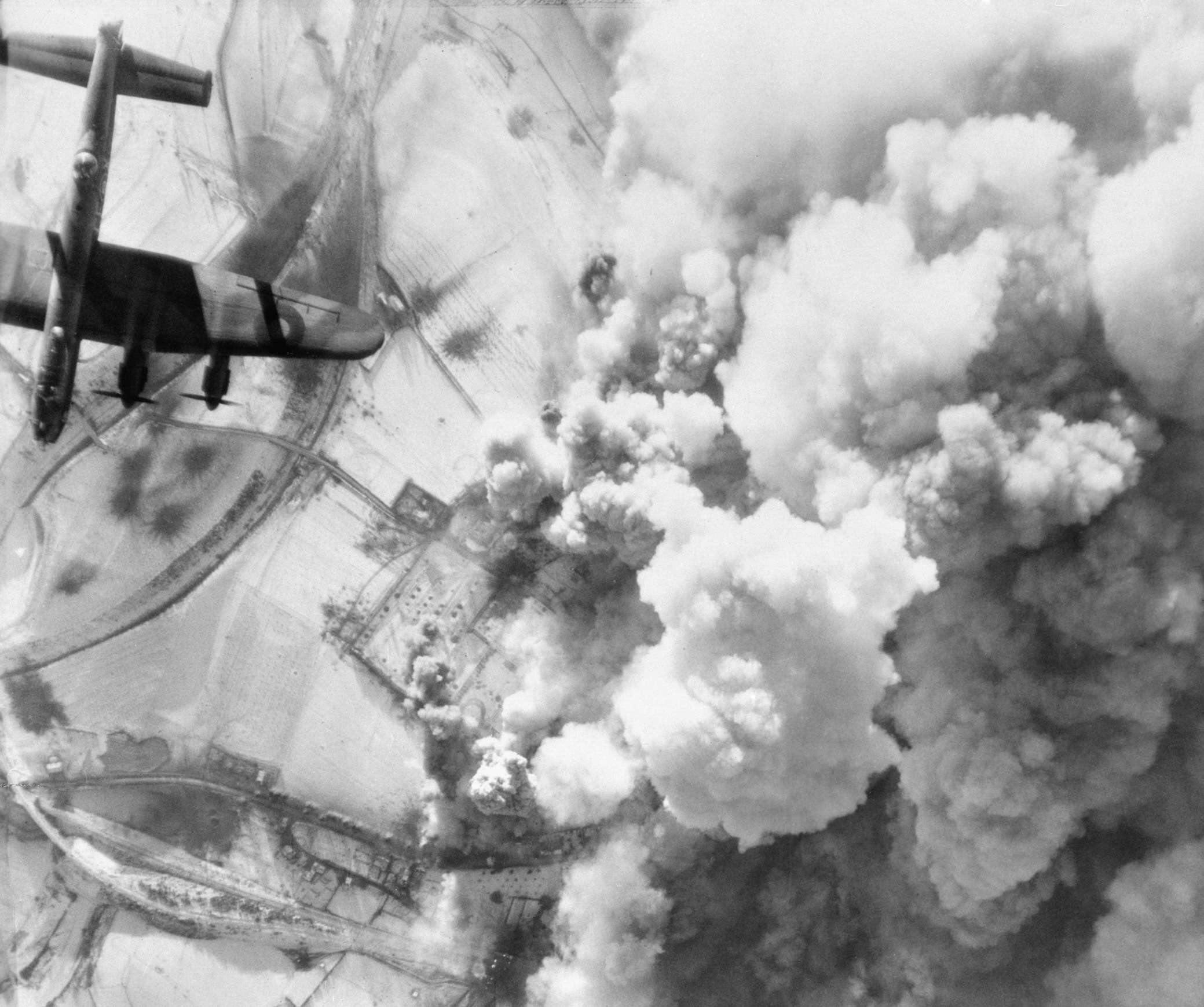
RAF Lancaster bombers target the Belgian town of St. Vith in the Ardennes, 1944.

Belgium was run by a German military government under General Alexander von Falkenhausen and Eggert Reeder until July 1944, and then by Reichskommissar Josef Grohé until liberation. The German government levied the costs of the military occupation on the Belgians through taxes, while also demanding "external occupation costs" (or "Anti-Bolshevik charge") to support operations elsewhere. In total, Belgium was forced to pay nearly two-thirds of its national income for these charges, a figure equaling 5.7 billion Reichsmarks.

As in all occupied countries in Europe, food, fuel and clothing were strictly rationed by the German authorities. Even with the stringent rationing, the food and materials which civilians should officially have been entitled to were not always available. A significant black market also existed in the country, supplying food illegally at very high prices to those that could afford it. Information and the press were strictly controlled by the German government and news was greatly restricted. Nevertheless, the sales of collaborationist newspapers like Le Soir and the newspapers of pro-collaborationist political parties like Le Pays Réel remained high. A large number of underground newspapers were also published and distributed – the underground paper La Libre Belgique achieved a circulation of 30,000.

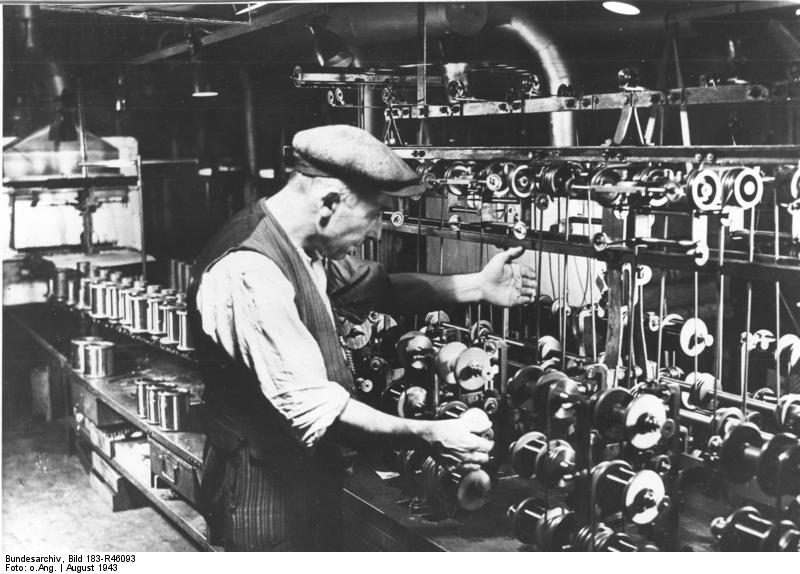
A Belgian forced worker in the Siemens factory in Berlin, August 1943.

Occupied Belgium was also targeted by the Allied bombers from both the British RAF and American USAAF. The policy led to high civilian casualties as bombs missed their intended targets and fell on civilian areas. In a raid on the Erla Motor Works in the Belgian town of Mortsel (near Antwerp) in April 1943, just two bombs dropped by the B-17s of the U.S. 8th Air Force fell on the intended target. The remaining 24 tons of bombs fell on civilian areas of the town, killing 936 and injuring 1,600 more in just eight minutes. The Allied policy was condemned by many leading figures within Belgium, including Cardinal van Roey.

Around 375,000 Belgians also served in labour programs within Germany during the war, working in manual jobs in industry or agriculture for the German war effort. Though nearly 180,000 Belgians signed up before conscription began in 1941, most were conscripted after that date and worked as forced labour against their will.

200,000 Belgian military prisoners of war, who had been captured in 1940, were also transported to Germany. Most were used as forced labour and paid only a nominal sum. About 80,000 (mainly Flemish) prisoners were returned to Belgium between late 1940 and 1941, but many remained in captivity until the end of the war. They were often kept in very poor conditions and around 2,000 died.

=== Collaboration ===
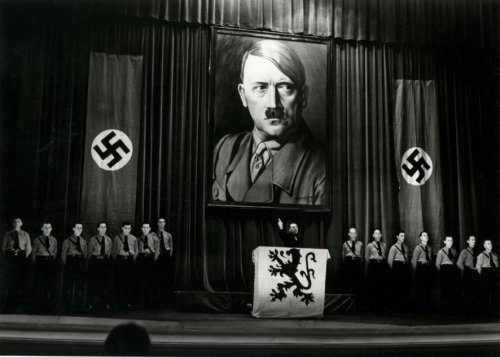
Belgian Flemish nationalist politician (VNV), writer and poet Ward Hermans (1897 - 1992) as a speaker at a meeting of the General SS Flanders in Ghent, during the German occupation in World War II.

During the period of Nazi occupation, some Belgians collaborated with their occupiers. There were pro-Nazi political organizations in both Flemish and Walloon communities before and during the war. The most significant were DeVlag, Verdinaso and Vlaams Nationaal Verbond (VNV) in Flanders as well as the Catholic Rex movement in Wallonia. Each of these movements had subtly different ideologies, their own paramilitary forces and printed their own newspapers. These organisations were also instrumental in encouraging Belgians to enlist into the German Army. Unlike the German-style National Socialist agenda of DeVlag, VNV appealed directly to a Flemish separatist agenda, though this message was never the main source of their popularity. Infighting between the groups, particularly VNV and DeVlag, was considerable.

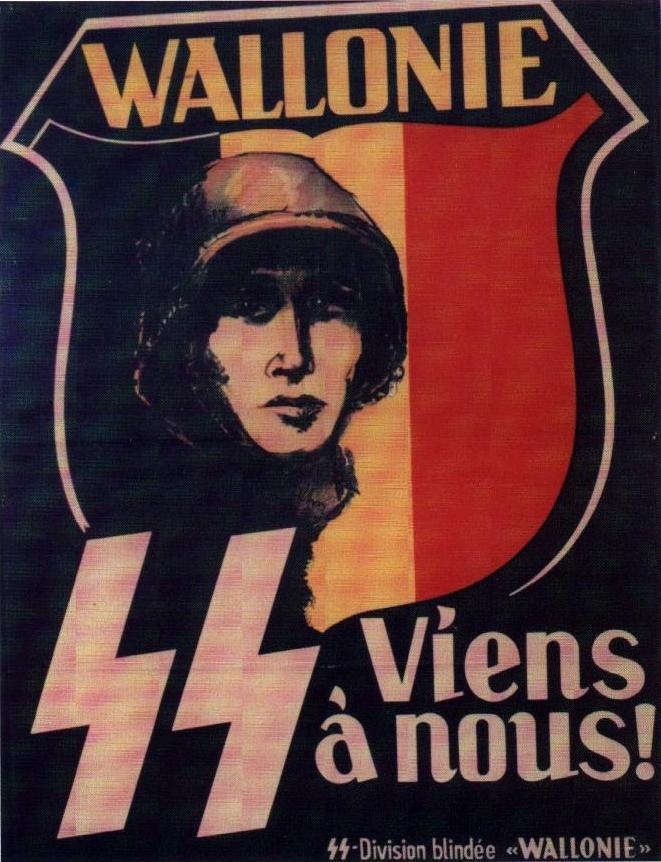
Recruitment poster with the slogan "Come to us!" for the 28th SS "Wallonien" Division made up of French-speaking Belgians.

On the whole, the Belgian administrative system was very pliant and became an instrument of collaboration. In a 2007 report by a Belgian research institute, Cegesoma, a panel of historians concluded that Belgium had offered "maximum administrative collaboration" with the German occupation forces. The same report also commented on the apparently higher levels of collaboration in Flanders as part of an attempted integration into a "German-Flemish New Order". The towns of Brussels and Liège, the report added, "remained [generally] patriotic-Belgian and decisively hostile to Germany". The report also found that many Belgian authorities had been compliant, even active, in the deportation of Jews.

Two separate units of the Waffen-SS, the Flemish Legion and the Walloon Legion, were recruited from Belgium during the occupation. Léon Degrelle, founder of the Rexist Party, served as commander of the Walloon Legion, which fought against the Soviet Union in Eastern Europe. A total of 15,000 Belgians in the "divisions" (neither ever greater than brigade strength) fought on the Eastern Front where the Walloon Legion was nearly annihilated in the Korsun–Cherkassy Pocket in 1944.

After the war, a total of 400,000 Belgians were investigated for collaboration. Of these, around 56,000 were prosecuted. The majority received prison sentences although several hundred were executed.

=== Resistance ===
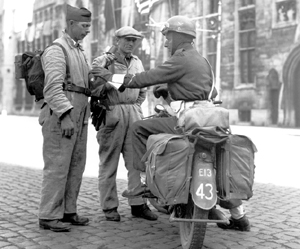
Members of the Belgian resistance with a Canadian soldier during the liberation of Bruges, 1944.

Resistance to German occupation came from all levels and regions of Belgium and quarters of the political spectrum, but was highly fragmented and localised. The Belgian government in exile dealt only with sympathetic resistance groups, like the Armée Secrète; however, even these umbrella organisations had many different agendas or political ideologies. Some groups were very left-wing, like the Communist Partisans armés, but there were also right-wing resistance movements, like the monarchist Mouvement National Royaliste and the fascist Légion Belge, created by members of the pre-war Légion Nationale movement. There were also other groups like Groupe G which had no obvious political affiliation.

Resistance to the occupiers often came in the form of helping Allied airmen shot down over Belgium escape. Belgians created numerous escape and evasion lines. The best known was the Comet line which evacuated an estimated 700 Allied airmen to Gibraltar from where they were flown to England. The Comet Line sheltered downed airmen in safe houses throughout Belgium. Allied airmen were given civilian clothes and moved from house to house, staying with Belgian families who supported the resistance. The escape lines gave the airmen false identification papers and guided them to neutral or Allied occupied territory. The guides were usually young women. Hundreds of the workers for the escape lines were captured and imprisoned by the Germans and many were executed.

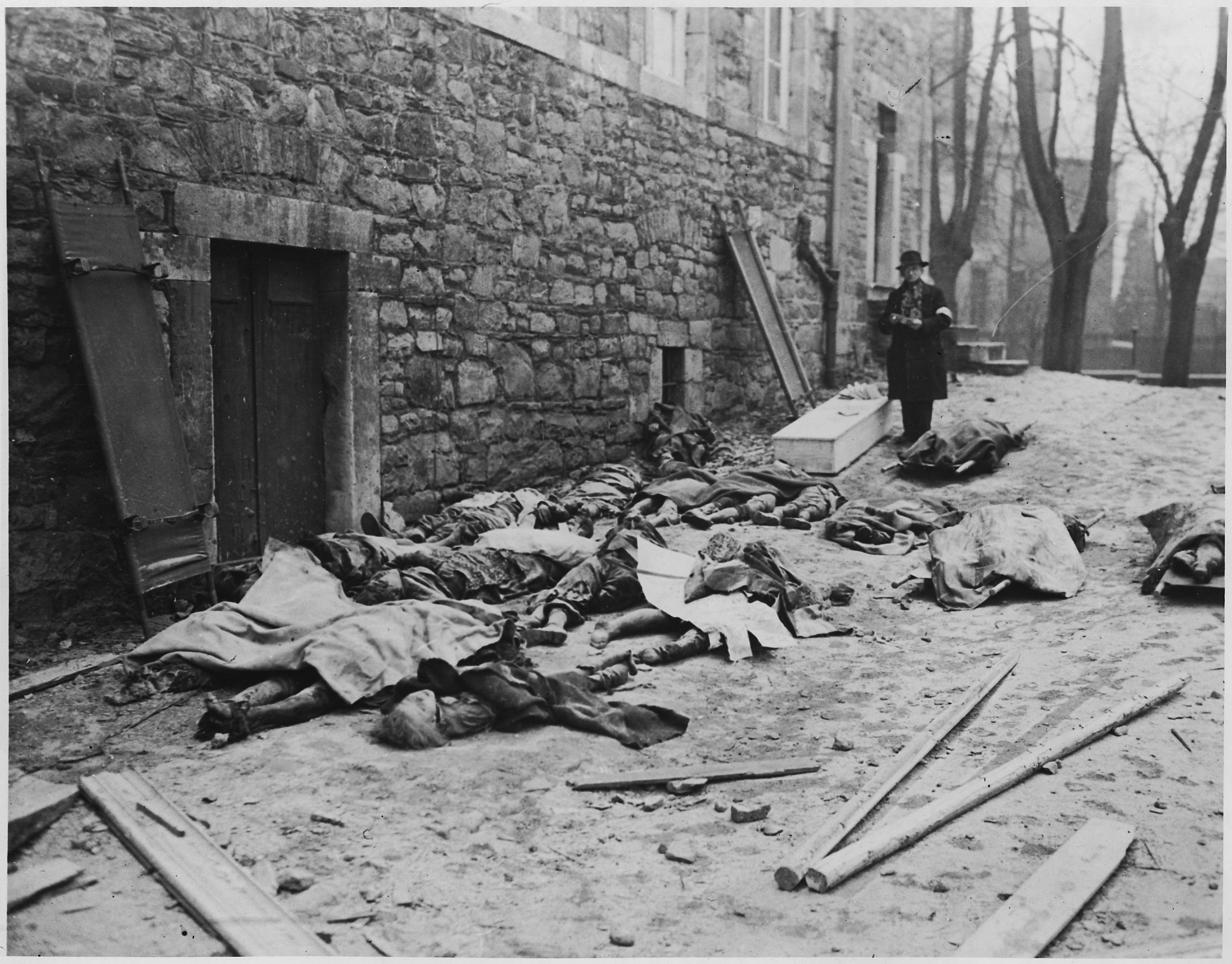
The bodies of Belgian civilians killed by Germans, December 1944

As elsewhere, sabotage was employed against enemy military and economic assets, with railway lines and bridges being common targets. The activities of Groupe G, a small student resistance cell based in Brussels, alone are estimated to have cost the Nazis 10 million man-hours of labour to repair damages done. Direct attacks on German troops and military installations were rarer, yet one estimate puts the number of German soldiers killed by the Belgian resistance in 1941 as higher than in all of France.

The resistance were instrumental in saving Jews and Roma from deportation to death camps, for instance the attack on the "Twentieth convoy" to Auschwitz. Many Belgians also hid Jews and political dissidents during the occupation, with one estimate putting the number at some 20,000 people hidden during the war. (Note: The Museum van Deportatie en Verzet puts the number at 20,000 Jews, including 3,000 children. The historian Eva Fogelman supplies a figure of 20,000 adults and 8,000 children in hiding.) There was also significant low-level resistance, for instance in June 1941, the City Council of Brussels refused to distribute Stars of David badges. Certain high-profile members of the Belgian establishment, including Queen Elizabeth and Cardinal van Roey, Archbishop of Malines, spoke out against the German treatment of Jews. So far, 1,612 Belgians have been awarded the distinction of "Righteous Among the Nations" by the State of Israel for risking their lives to save Jews from persecution during the occupation.

Belgian civilians were often subject to retaliation by paramilitaries and German forces for resistance activity. In August 1944, 20 civilians were killed by Rexist paramilitaries in the Courcelles Massacre in reprisal for a single attack on a Rexist politician.

=== The Holocaust ===
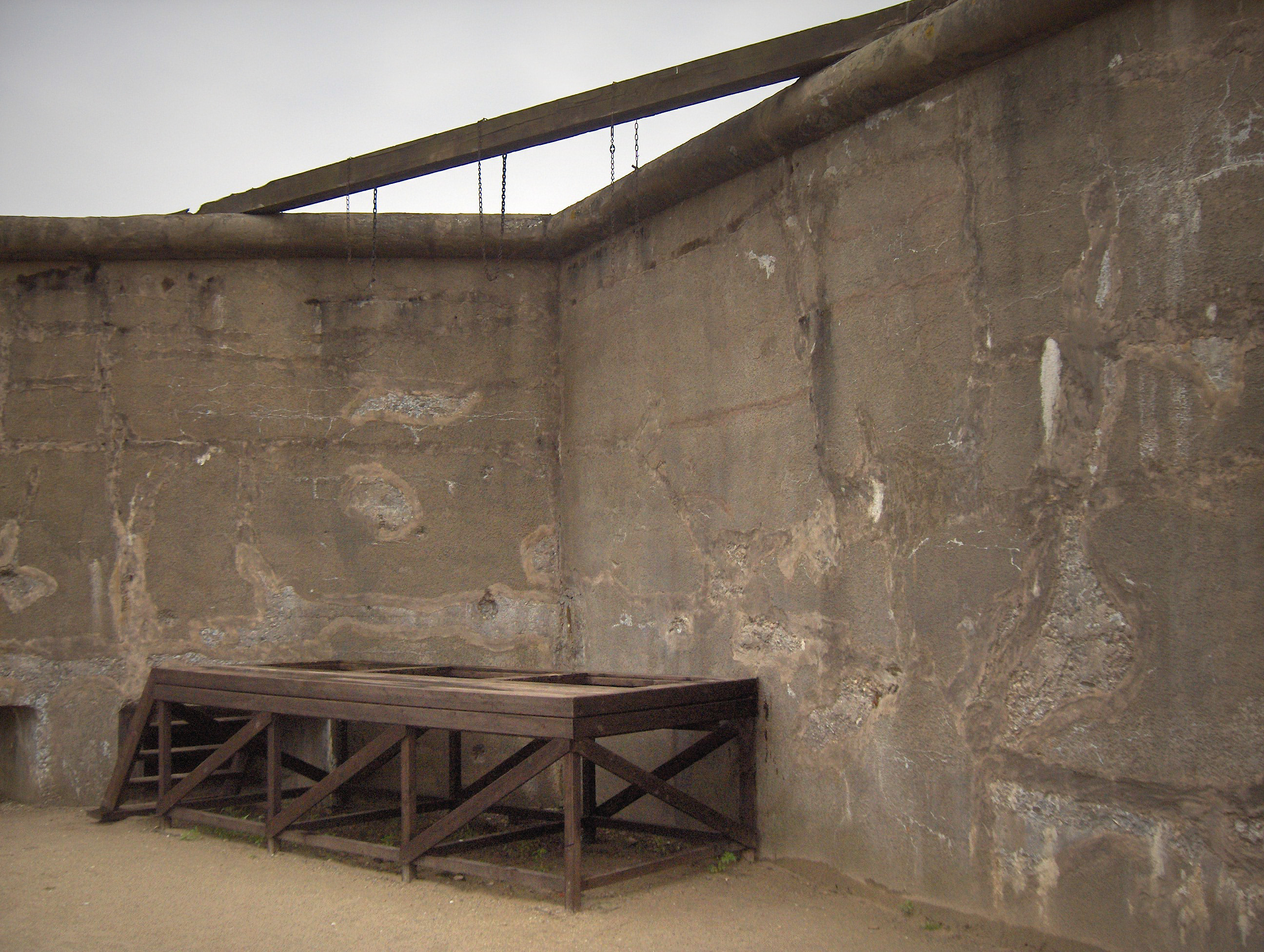
The gallows at Breendonk Concentration Camp, near Mechelen.

In mid-1940, nearly 57,000 Jews were living in Belgium out of a population of roughly 8 million. Many had fled to Belgium to escape recent persecution in Germany and elsewhere, meaning that only a minority were Belgian citizens. Most of the Jewish population was focused in communities in the towns of Brussels and Antwerp.

Anti-Jewish legislation (along the lines of the German Nuremberg Laws or French laws on the status of Jews) was enacted in October 1940, a few months after the German occupation. Several pogroms took place in 1941, notably in Antwerp, and economic assets belonging to Jews were seized. In May 1942, wearing of the yellow Star-of-David badge became compulsory for Jews in Belgium.

From June 1942, as part of the "Final Solution", Jews living in Belgium were ordered to report to the Mechelen transit camp. Those who did not do so voluntarily were rounded up by the police. Between August 1942 and July 1944, a total of twenty-six railway convoys deported 25,000 Jews and 350 Roma from Belgium to eastern Europe. Most were sent to the Auschwitz death camp, although others went to camps at Bergen-Belsen and Vittel.

Of the 25,000 deported, over 24,000 were killed. Fewer than 1,000 were still alive by the time Allied forces liberated the camps.

The former Belgian army fort at Breendonk, near Mechelen, was requisitioned by the Nazis and used for detainment and interrogation of Jews, political prisoners and captured members of the resistance. Of the 3,500 people incarcerated in Breendonk between 1940 and 1944, 1,733 died. Around 300 people were killed in the camp itself, with at least 98 of them dying from deprivation or torture.

== Belgian government and army in exile ==
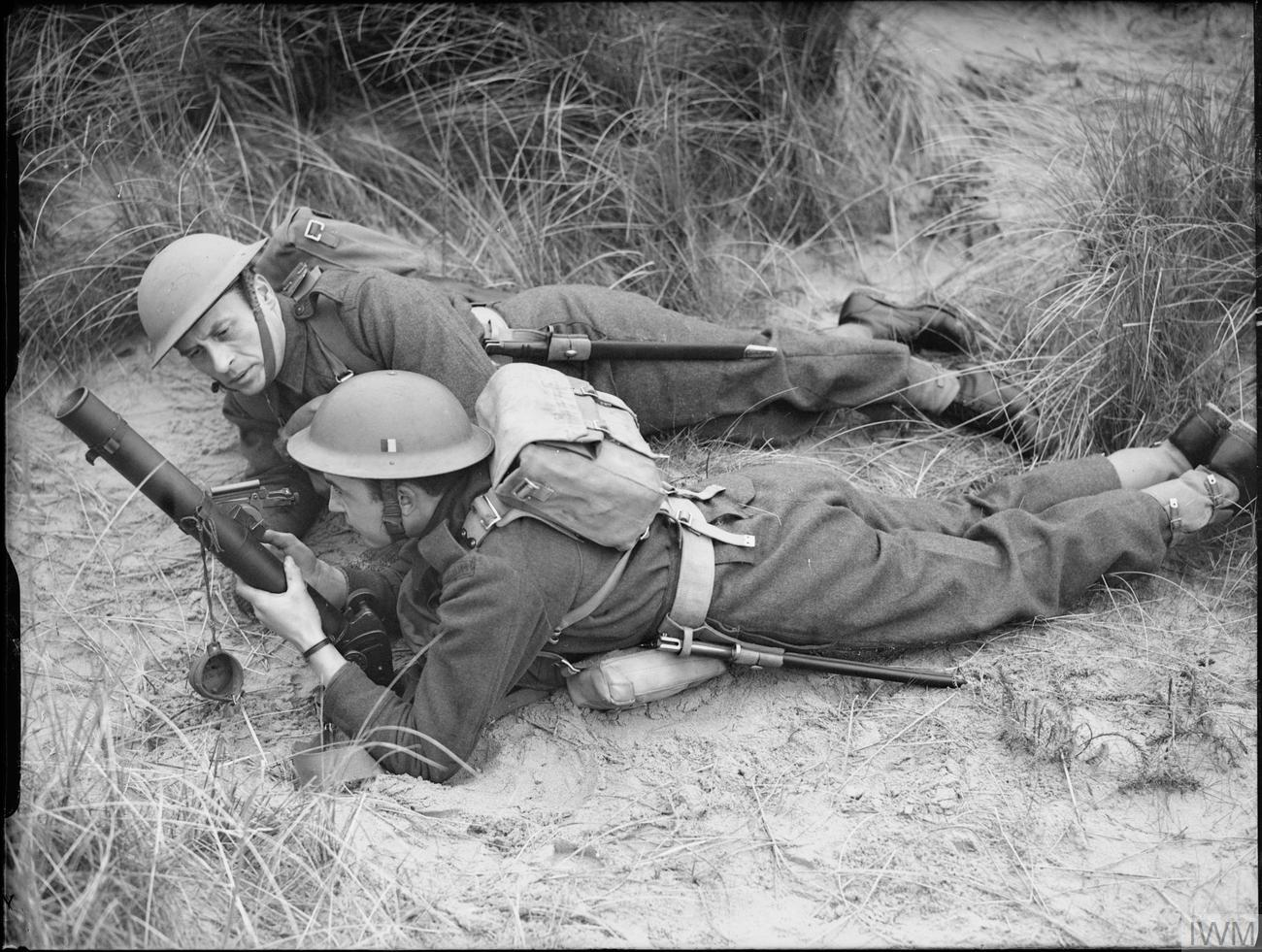
Free Belgian soldiers fire a mortar during a training exercise in Wales, 1941.

After the defeat in 1940, significant numbers of Belgian soldiers and civilians escaped to Britain who, along with Belgian pre-war émigrés in Britain and Canada, formed the Belgian forces in exile. The Belgian government, including ministers from Catholic, Socialist and Liberal parties under Hubert Pierlot, evacuated to London alongside other governments from occupied countries (including the Netherlands and Luxembourg) where it remained until the liberation of Belgium in 1944.

The government in exile claimed the authority to speak for the whole of Belgium, leading the Minister of Foreign Affairs, Paul-Henri Spaak, to comment that "all that remains of legal and free Belgium, all that is entitled to speak in her name, is in London". A Belgian politician, Victor de Laveleye, is also credited with inspiring the Allied "V for Victory" propaganda campaign in 1941. The Belgium government in exile declared war on the Empire of Japan on 20 December 1941.

In a broadcast on French Radio, Pierlot called for the creation of an army in exile to continue the fight:

With the same youthful courage that responded to the government's call, reunited with the elements of the Belgian military in France and Great Britain, a new army will be levied and organized. It will go into the line alongside those of our allies ... all the forces we have will be put at the service of the cause which has become ours ... It is important to assure immediately and in a tangible way, the solidarity which continues to unite the powers which have given us their support ...

— Pierlot, Speech on French Radio, 28 May 1940

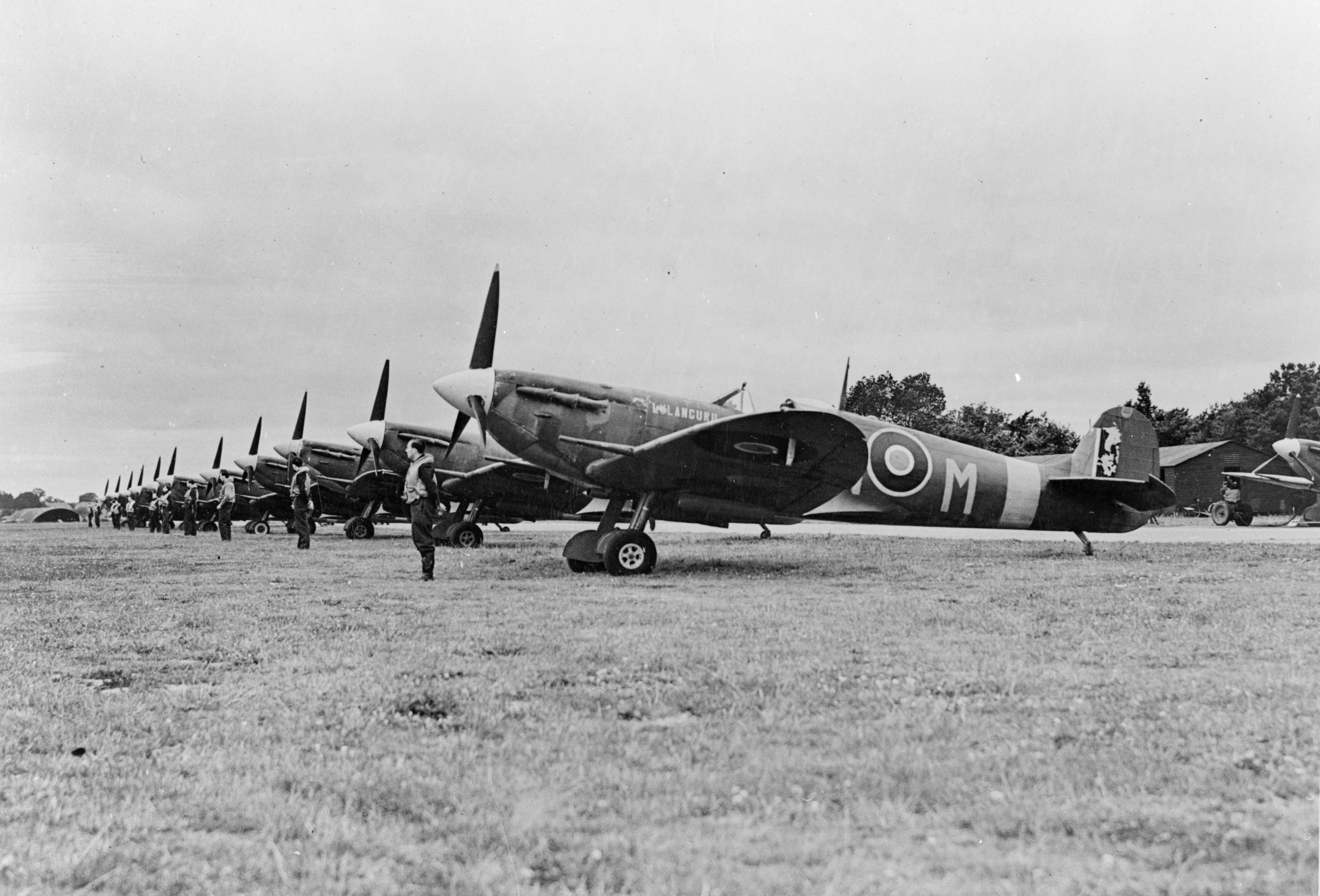
Spitfires of No. 350 (Belgian) Squadron at RAF Kenley in England, 1942.

By 1944, the Free Belgian forces in the United Kingdom numbered some 4,500 men. Belgian soldiers formed the 1st Belgian Infantry Brigade (which also included an artillery battery of soldiers from Luxembourg) more often known as the Brigade Piron after its commanding officer, Jean-Baptiste Piron. The Brigade Piron was involved in the Normandy Invasion and the battles in France and the Netherlands until liberation.

Belgians also served in British special forces units during the war, forming a troop of No.10 (Inter-Allied) Commando, which was involved in the Italian Campaign and the Landings on Walcheren. The 5th Special Air Service (part of the élite SAS) was made up entirely of Belgians and was the first Allied unit to enter Belgium in September 1944.

400 Belgian pilots served in the Royal Air Force. Two all-Belgian fighter units, Nos. 349 and 350 Squadrons, served in the European theatre. No. 350 Squadron alone claimed 51 "kills" between its formation in November 1941 and the end of the war. In total, 1,200 Belgians served in the RAF, mainly in British or Free Dutch squadrons.

Two corvettes and a group of minesweepers were also operated by the Belgians during the Battle of the Atlantic. By 1943, 350 Belgians were serving as sailors on these vessels.

== Belgian Congo ==
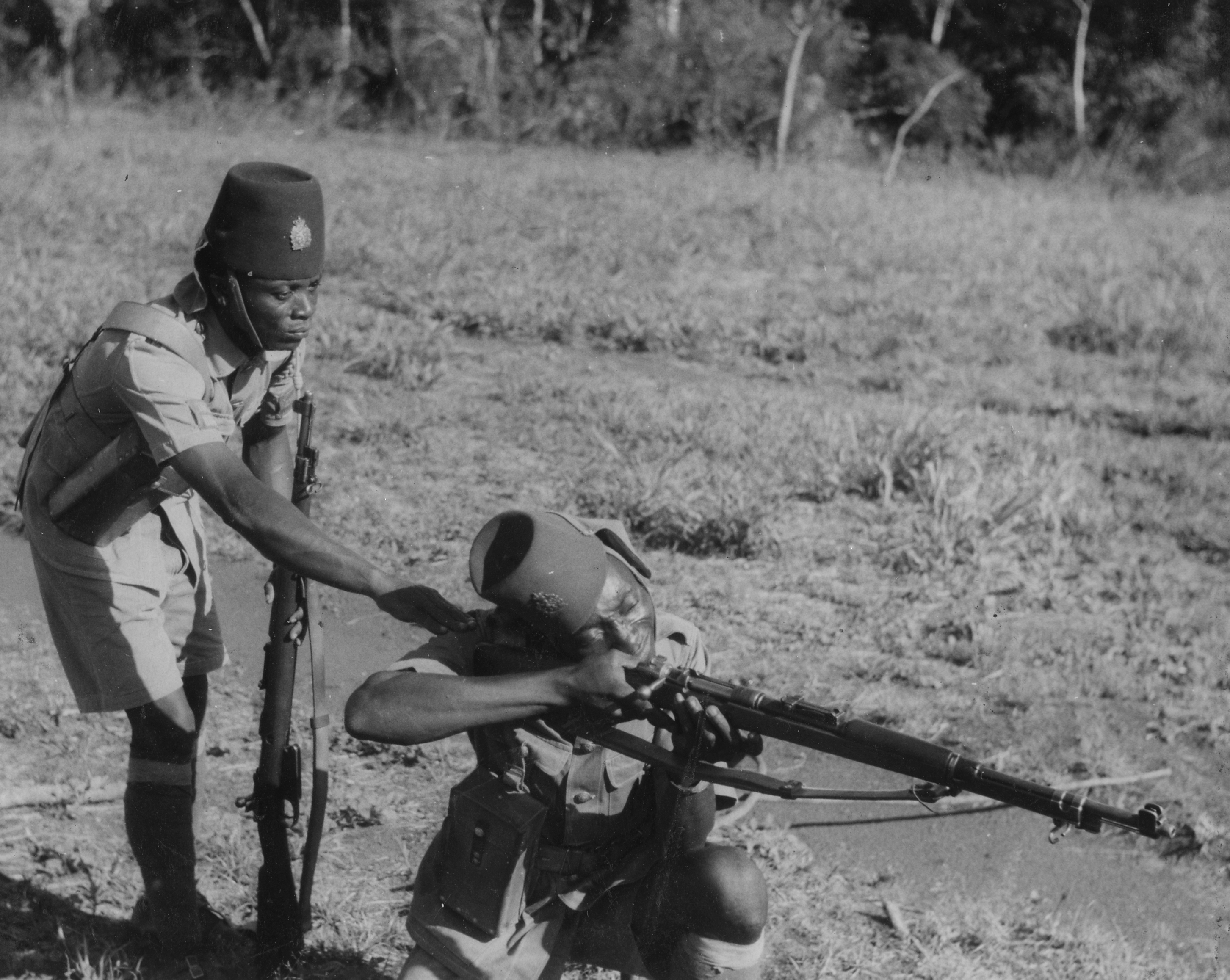
Two Force Publique soldiers in 1943

Despite Belgium's occupation, the Belgian Congo remained loyal to the government in exile and was put at the disposal of the Allies, making a significant contribution to the Allied war effort.

Congolese soldiers of the Force Publique were involved in fighting with Italian forces during the East African Campaign and were instrumental to forcing Italian forces out of Abyssinia, suffering 500 casualties. 13,000 Congolese troops served under British command in Nigeria. Detachments of Congolese soldiers also served in the Middle East and Burma. In total, the Force Publique comprised approximately 40,000 men and was racially segregated meaning that blacks could not become officers. Throughout the war, therefore, it was commanded by white officers.

Twice, in 1941 and 1944, major strikes took place in towns around the country against the extra pressure put on workers by the colonial authorities. The Force Publique garrison in Luluabourg also mutinied in 1944. These were repressed by military force, often violently.

The Congo was also a vitally important economic asset to the Allied powers. The Congo's gold alone contributed some $28.5 million to the Allied war effort, while its exports of rubber and uranium provided vital sources of raw materials. Most of the uranium used during the American Manhattan Project – including that used for the nuclear weapons dropped on the Japanese cities of Hiroshima and Nagasaki – was supplied by the Belgian firm Union Minière du Haut Katanga from Katanga Province in the Belgian Congo.

== Liberation ==
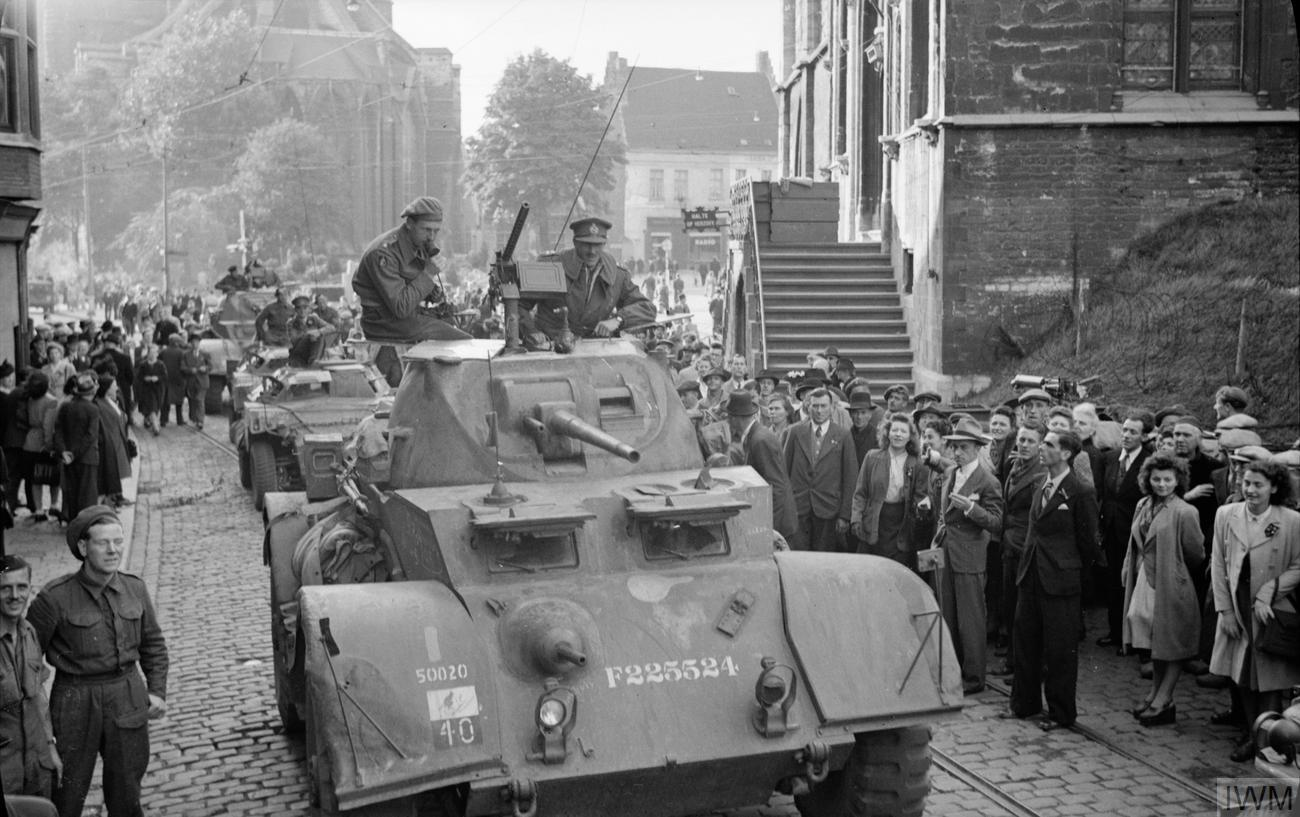
British armoured cars during the liberation of Ghent, September 8th 1944.

Belgium was liberated in September 1944 by the Allied forces, including British, Canadian, and American armies, which also included the Brigade Piron. On 3 September 1944, the Welsh Guards liberated Brussels. Just after the liberation, the inhabitants of the Marolles district held a mock funeral for Hitler.

The port of Antwerp was an important strategic objective because Allied supply lines were heavily stretched and needed a deep-sea port near the front lines. The British Second Army liberated Antwerp on 6 September, with help from the local resistance. Despite taking control of the city, the port was not accessible until the surrounding waters were safe for cargo ships. The Germans successfully denied access to the port until the Battle of the Scheldt completed in November.

Leopold III's brother, Charles, the Count of Flanders, was appointed Regent, pending a decision about whether the King would be able to regain his former position on the throne. In February 1945, Achille Van Acker replaced Pierlot as Prime Minister. The resistance was disarmed, and many of its members and other Belgians who had remained in the country during the occupation were mobilised into the regular Belgian army in 57 "Fusilier Battalions". These battalions served in several battles on the western front. 100,000 Belgians were fighting in the Allied armies by VE Day.

General Courtney Hodges' U.S. First Army liberated the region south of Brussels and Maastricht in early September 1944. While two corps of the First Army were concentrated elsewhere, VIII Corps occupied a long stretch of the front from the area south of Liège, across the Ardennes and into Luxembourg. The length of the deployment meant that the Corps' front line was only lightly defended, leaving it vulnerable.

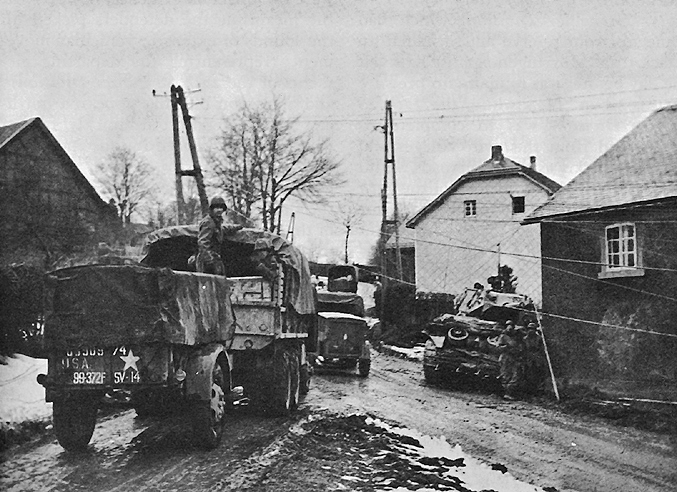
American soldiers of the 99th Infantry Division enter the Belgian village of Wirtzfeld, late 1944.

Following a few months of relative calm in Belgium, on 16 December 1944 the Germans launched the Ardennes Offensive with over a quarter of a million soldiers. Antwerp was the ultimate objective of the German offensive, but the German advance stalled before the Meuse River, at Celles near Dinant, and was pushed back in furious fighting over a period of six weeks in bitterly cold weather by American, British and Belgian troops. Belgian towns and civilians in the Ardennes suffered during the offensive as homes were reduced to ruins, and there were instances of German troops shooting civilians. Around 90% of the town of La Roche-en-Ardenne was destroyed during fighting. By 4 February 1945, the country was reported to be free of German troops.

In the six months following Allied liberation, Belgian towns were widely targeted by the unpiloted German V-Bombs. A total of 2,342 of these rockets (1610 of the more advanced V-2s and about 732 V-1s) fell in a 10-mile radius around Antwerp alone. A post-war SHAEF report estimated V-Bombs had been responsible for killing 5,000 people and injuring a further 21,000, mostly in the cities of Liège and Antwerp.

The period after liberation also saw a wave of prosecutions of those suspected of collaboration during the war. 400,000 Belgians were investigated for collaboration of whom 56,000 were prosecuted. Nearly 250 were executed. Léon Degrelle, despite being sentenced to death, managed to escape to Francoist Spain where he remained until his death in 1994.

== Legacy and aftermath ==
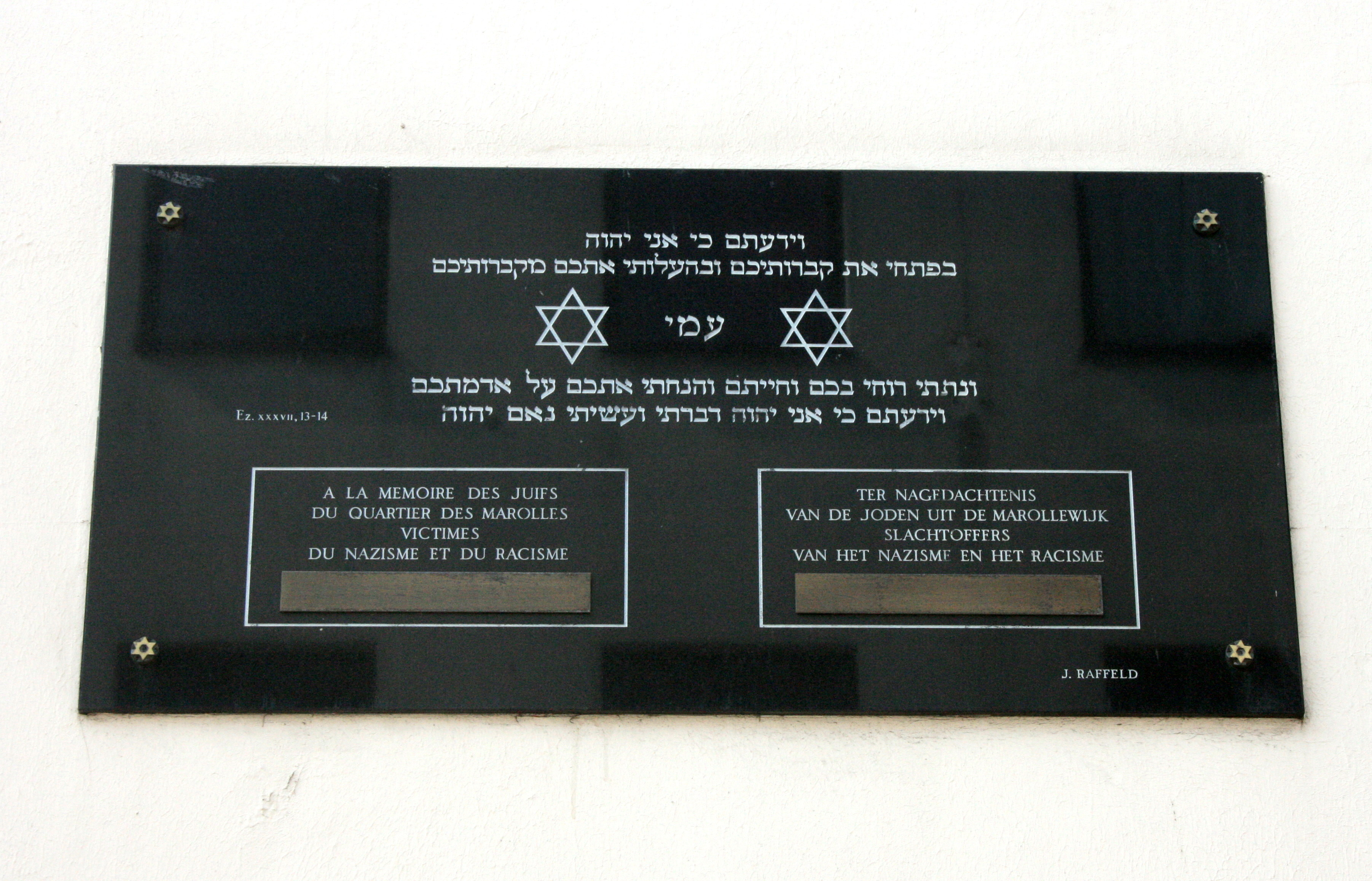
Plaque commemorating the Belgian victims of the Holocaust in the Marolles area of Brussels.

After the experience of World War II, Belgium abandoned its neutral stance in international politics, in favour of military, political and economic integration. In 1949, Belgium joined the North Atlantic Treaty Organization and deployed troops to fight alongside other United Nations forces in the Korean War in 1950. Belgium was also a key player in the unsuccessful negotiations about the creation of a European Defence Community (EDC) in the 1950s. Belgium was assigned a sector of the British zone in West Germany, around the city of Cologne, which it occupied from 1945. Belgian soldiers remained in Germany until their final withdrawal in 2002.

Economically, Belgium joined the Benelux Economic Union in 1948 and was a founding member of the European Coal and Steel Community from its creation in 1952. From 1944 until 1960, Belgium also experienced a period of rapid economic recovery, dubbed the "Belgian Miracle", partially as a result of the Marshall Plan.

The political crisis surrounding Leopold III's role during the occupation, and whether he could return to the throne, polarized Belgian public opinion in the years following the war between Catholics, notably in Flanders, who broadly supported his return, and Socialists, in Wallonia and Brussels, who were strongly opposed to it. After a general strike and an indecisive referendum, the king resigned in favour of his son, Baudouin, in 1950.

=== Commemoration ===
In the decades following the war, large numbers of public memorials were erected around the country in memory of Belgian soldiers who had died fighting for the Allied cause during the conflict. (Note: For a map of all World War II memorials in Brussels, see "Brussels Remembers". Archived from the original on 15 May 2013.) There are numerous monuments and streets dedicated to Allied politicians and generals, including Franklin Roosevelt and Bernard Montgomery in Brussels. The large numbers of British and American cemeteries and memorials, particularly in the Ardennes region associated with the Battle of the Bulge, meant that the legacy of the war was very visible.

In common with other countries, there are numerous veterans' associations (known as "Fraternelle" or "Amicale" in French) and Belgian towns, particularly Bastogne, are frequently visited by veterans from other countries. There are also numerous war museums around the country, including the Royal Museum of the Army and Military History in Brussels, which aim to inform the public about the war. The Holocaust is commemorated in Belgium by both memorials and museums; the prison at Fort Breendonk has been preserved as a museum and has been open to the public since 1947. Since the passing of the Holocaust denial law in 1995, it is illegal to deny the holocaust.

The participation of soldiers from the Belgian Congo was, however, largely forgotten following Congolese independence in 1960 and decades of subsequent war. In recent years the profile of the veterans has been raised by exhibitions creating greater public awareness.

== See also ==
- Order of battle of armour units of the Belgian Army in May 1940
- Faux Soir – a 1943 resistance spoof of the collaborationist newspaper Le Soir
- Commemorative Medal of the War 1940–1945 – medal awarded to all Belgian veterans of the war
- Belgian annexation plans after the Second World War
- The Sorrow of Belgium – a novel by the Flemish writer Hugo Claus about growing up in occupied Belgium.
- Belgium in World War I
- History of Belgium
- Antwerp X
