= OMBr =

OMBr is an abbreviation meaning separate mechanized brigade (Ukrainian: Окрема механізована бригада, romanized: Okrema mekhanizovana bryhada)

OMBr may refer to:

- 14th Mechanized Brigade (Ukraine)
- 21st Mechanized Brigade (Ukraine)
- 22nd Mechanized Brigade (Ukraine)
- 33rd Mechanized Brigade (Ukraine)
- 41st Mechanized Brigade (Ukraine)
- 63rd Mechanized Brigade (Ukraine)
- 66th Mechanized Brigade (Ukraine)
- 67th Mechanized Brigade (Ukraine)
- 92nd Mechanized Brigade (Ukraine)
- 93rd Mechanized Brigade (Ukraine)
- 115th Mechanized Brigade (Ukraine)

== See also ==
- Organisation Militaire Belge de Résistance (OMBR)
