= Bodson =

Bodson may refer to:-

- Herman Bodson - Belgian resistance member and mineralogist
- Omer Bodson - Belgian army officer
- Philippe Bodson - Belgian businessman and former senator
- Victor Bodson - Justice minister of Luxembourg
  - The Victor Bodson Bridge named after him
