= Service D =

Belgian resistance group during World War II

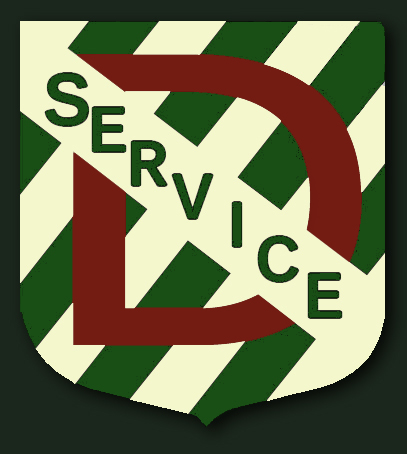
- Leader: Joseph Joset (founder)
- Dates active: July 1940~
- Active regions: Provinces of Luxembourg, Liège and Limburg
- Wars: the Belgian Resistance (World War II)

Service D was a small group of the Belgian resistance during the Second World War which operated chiefly in the provinces of Luxembourg, Liège and Limburg. The "D" in the group's name is said to have stood for the activities which the group was involved in: the fight against "Defeatism" and "Denunciation" as well as the "Demoralization" of the Germans.

== History ==
Service D was founded in July 1940 in Liège by Joseph Joset. From 1941, the group specialized in the diversion of letters of denouncement to the police and the warning of those threatened who were threatened by them. This was possible because of the group's agents in the Postal Service. One of the group's members even served as a telephonist at a Gestapo headquarters. It also attempted to identify the informers. A subsection of the group, known as Équipe Z was involved in sabotage.

Between April and May 1944, 80 members of the group were arrested in a series of attacks by the Germans, including much of the group's leadership.
