= Fusilier Battalions (Belgium) =

Fusilier Battalions # 1–39 and 45–62
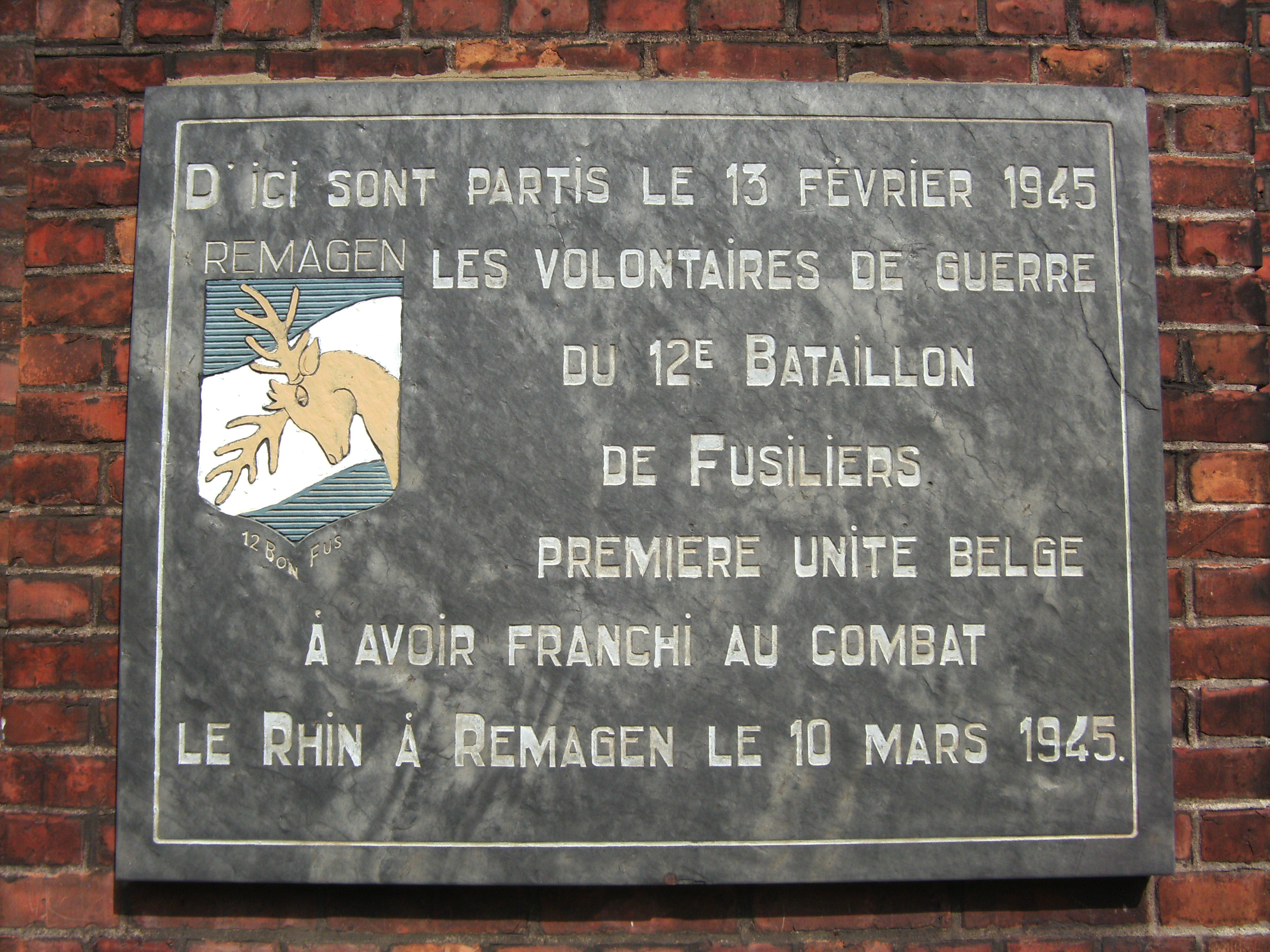
- Plaque commemorating the 12th Fusilier Battalion which participated in the Battle of Remagen in March 1945
- Active: October 1944 – June 1945
- Country: Belgium
- Type: Infantry, engineer, logistics, auxiliary and guard units.
- Size: 53,700 (total)
- Engagements: Western Front (World War II); Battle of the Bulge; Western Allied invasion of Germany; Battle of Remagen

The term fusilier battalions (French: Bataillons de fusiliers, Dutch: Bataljon Fusiliers) denotes 57 separate military formations which were raised in Belgium to fight alongside the Western Allies in the final months of World War II. Unlike the Free Belgian Forces which were raised in exile, the fusilier battalions were raised within Belgium after its Liberation from German occupation in September 1944. In total, 57 battalions (each numbered between 1–39 and 45–62) with a total of 53,700 men were raised between October 1944 and June 1945.

== Origins and creation ==
The concept of the fusilier battalions originated in plans by the Belgian government in exile to rebuild the Belgian Army once its national territory was liberated from German occupation. In June 1943, they created a formal plan to raise 18 battalions of soldiers in Belgium once the territory was regained. The core of the new force would be six battalions of front-line infantry to augment the existing Independent Belgian Brigade, known popularly as the "Piron Brigade" which had originally been formed in exile, and six battalions of fusiliers, intended to serve in auxiliary roles such as guarding lines of communication. A further six logistics (pionniers) battalions would be created. This was approved by the Supreme Headquarters Allied Expeditionary Force (SHAEF) in May 1944. Supply constraints, however, meant that the original targets were subsequently revised to create 12 battalions of fusiliers and four of pioneers, making a total of 6,000 men. The creation of the new units began after the liberation of Belgium in September 1944 and 12 battalions had been raised by the end of the year. They were equipped with surplus British uniforms and equipment.

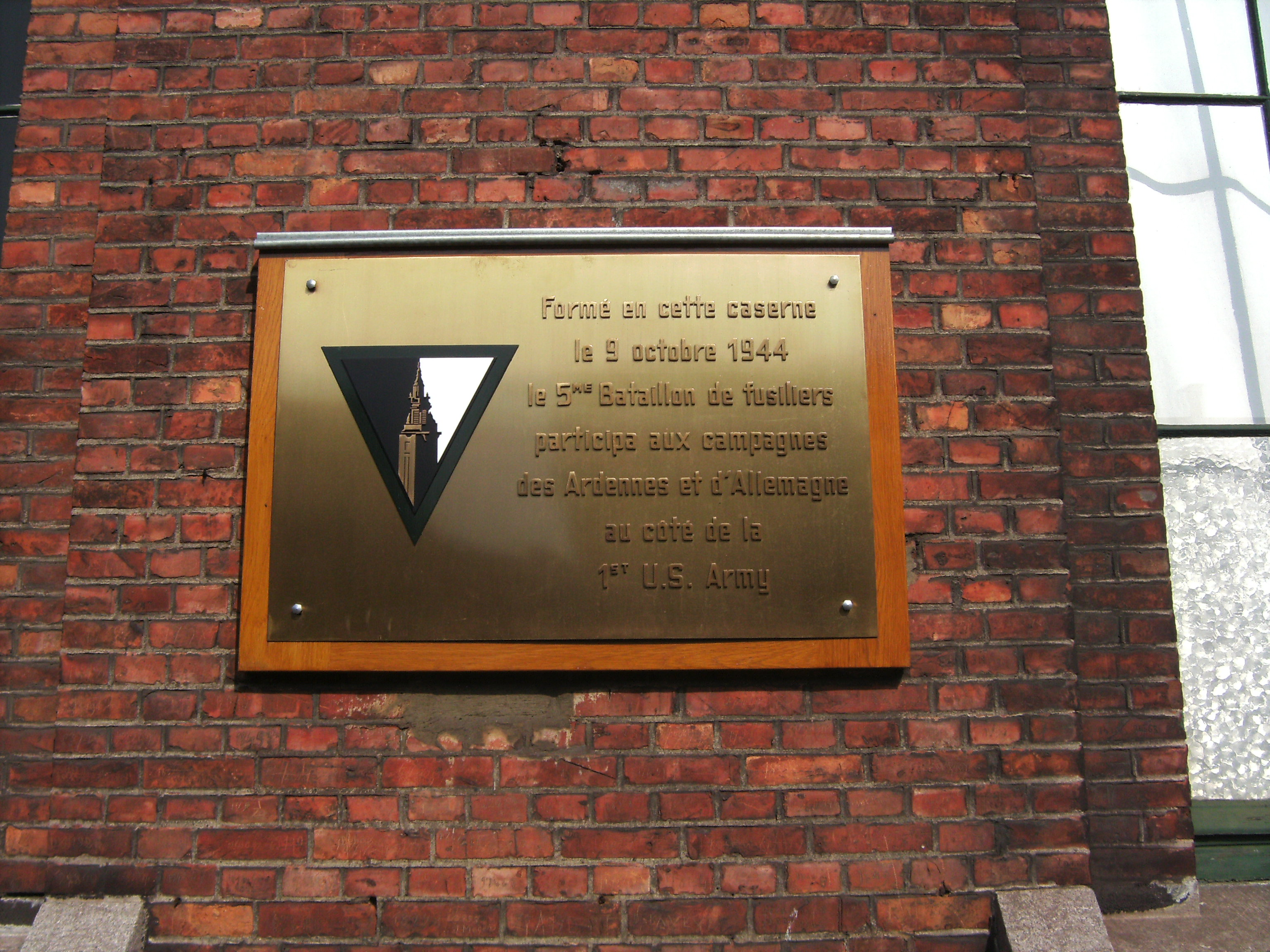
Plaque commemorating the 5th Fusilier Battalion formed in Charleroi in October 1944

After the failure of Operation Market Garden, however, the Allies decided to review the agreement. In December 1944, the Allies signed an agreement on Liberated Manpower Units (LMU) that called for the raising of 77 battalions of fusiliers and eight auxiliary logistics battalions over two years. If completed, the agreement would have resulted in the mobilisation of 91,000 men. In addition, the Belgian government had already begun a project of expanding the Piron Brigade into a new brigade of infantry, plus regiments of armour and artillery in a separate programme.

In all, 57 of the planned 77 fusilier battalions were created before the programme ended on VE Day. They were numbered between 1–39 and 45–62. A further four battalions of pioneers were created, as well as 34 companies of road transport and smaller auxiliary units. In total, 53,700 men served in the units. Many of those recruited into the battalions had been members of the Belgian Resistance, with 80 percent having been members of the right-wing Secret Army and National Royalist Movement groups.

Although the majority were still in training at the end of the war, 20 battalions saw active service on the Western Front in the final months of the war. These included the 1st, 2nd and 3rd battalions which served in the Netherlands, the 4th Battalion which was at the Rhine, the 5th and 6th which fought during the Battle of the Bulge, the 12th which participated in the Battle of Remagen, and the 17th which finished the war at Plzeň in Czechoslovakia. From December 1944, the remaining fusilier battalions were formed into 16 "Fusilier Brigades".

The fusilier battalions were separate from the five so-called Ireland Brigades (Brigades d'Irelande, Ierse Brigades) raised in 1945 which went sent to Northern Ireland for training and which were intended to serve as the basis for a post-war Belgian army. Soldiers from the 1st, 2nd, 3rd, and 11th fusilier battalions were, however, folded into the 6th "Deinze" Infantry Brigade.

== Bibliography ==
- Champion, Lucien (1973). La Chronique des 53.000. Brussels: Pierre de Méyère.
