= Organisation Militaire Belge de Résistance =

Belgian Military Organisation of Resistance OMBR
- Organisation Militaire Belge de Résistance
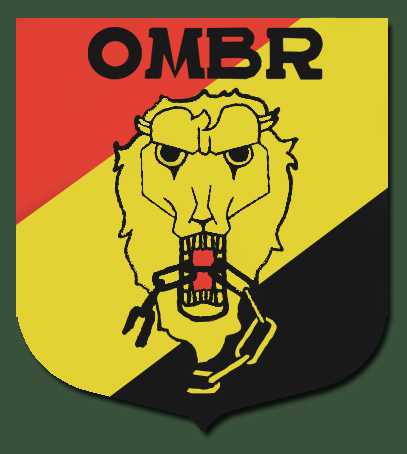
- Dates active: 1940–1944
- Active regions: Belgium
- Size: 3,112 (total)
- Wars: the Belgian Resistance (World War II)

The Belgian Military Organisation of Resistance (French: Organisation Militaire Belge de Résistance) or OMBR was a group within the Belgian resistance in German-occupied Belgium during World War II. It remained a reasonably small organisation throughout the war, comprising a total of 3,112 men and women. The acronym of the group was deliberately chosen as a homophone of the French word ombre meaning "shadow".

== History ==
Founded in 1940, the group only adopted the acronym OMBR in July 1942. The group's motto was "Better to die than to betray" (Note: « Mieux vaut mourir que trahir ») and its vow "I swear to be faithful to the country, to observe the laws and constitution of the Belgian people, to obey my superiors and never to betray."

== Notable members ==
- Herman Bodson – Belgian mineralogist, later author of a number of books about the Belgian resistance.
- G. Allaert, Commandant of the OMBR in 1944
