= Marie-Louise Hénin =

Member of the Belgian Resistance (1898–1944)

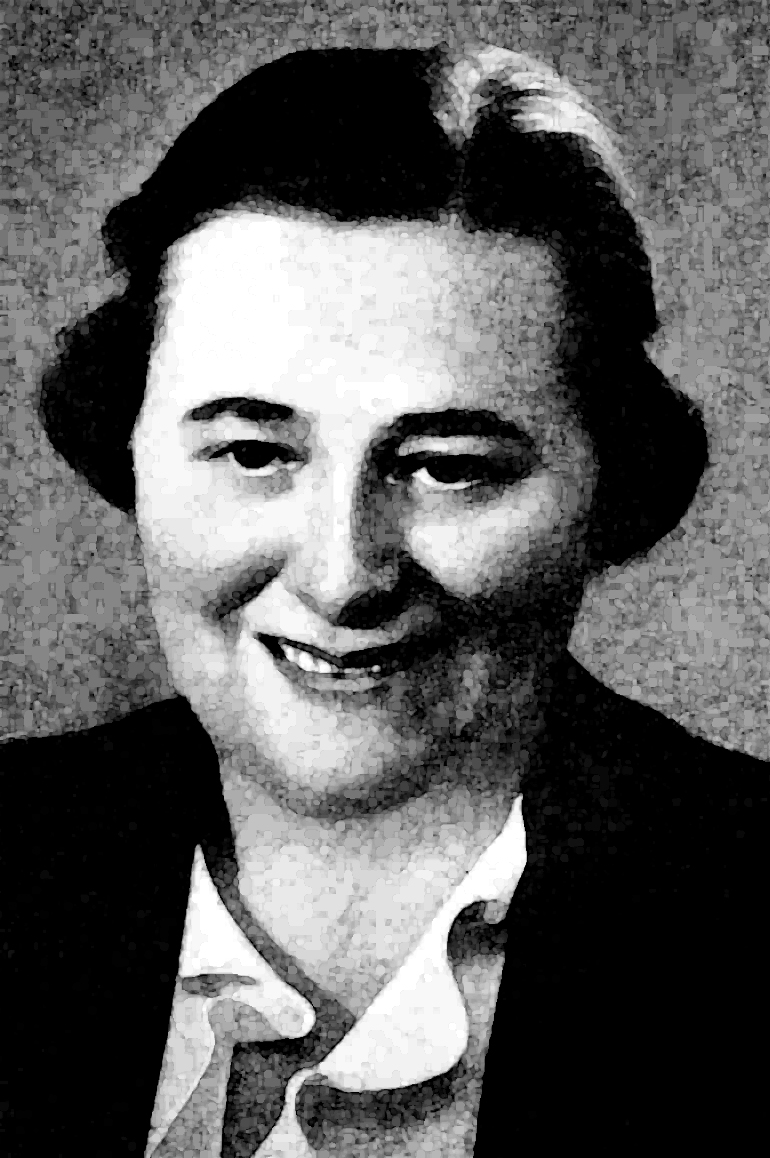
- An undated image of Hénin
- Born: 9 December 1898; Marche-en-Famenne, Belgium
- Died: June 9, 1944 (aged 45); Plötzensee Prison, Germany
- Cause of death: Beheaded
- Occupations: Dentist; Activist
- Years active: 1940–1944
- Known for: Participating in the Belgian Resistance
- Spouse: Carl Keil (divorced 1924)

Marie-Louise Ghislaine Hénin (9 December 1898 – 9 June 1944) was a Belgian dentist who was a member of the Belgian Resistance during World War II. She was one of the key figures behind the underground newspaper La Libre Belgique. In 1941, she was arrested and imprisoned by the Nazis; she was executed in 1944.

== Early life and education ==
Hénin was born on 9 December 1898 in Marche-en-Famenne, in the Belgian province of Luxembourg, to Louis Gilles Hénin and Marie Adèle Renson, who ran a butcher shop. Hénin was one of four children. In 1908, the family moved to La Louvière in Hainaut Province, where Hénin attended secondary school. Hénin and her sister Marie-Thérèse later moved to Germany to study, where Hénin met and married Carl Keil, a German dentist.

In 1924, Hénin separated from Keil, and moved to Buenos Aires, Argentina, where she worked as a governess while studying medicine. She returned to Belgium in 1926, and qualified as a dental surgeon in 1929. Hénin opened her own dental practice in Marche-en-Famenne. She later moved to the Rue des Ailes in Schaerbeek, Brussels.

== Joining the Belgian Resistance ==
Following the German invasion of Belgium in 1940, Hénin joined the Belgian Resistance, under the code name Colas. She transmitted information to the British forces through the service de renseignement Zéro. In 1941, Hénin gave up her dental practice to focus on underground activities. She focused her attention on trying to unify the different resistance groups operating in Belgium, which often had little contact with one another.

From 1940, Hénin became involved in the production and publication of La Libre Belgique, a clandestine newspaper of the Belgian underground. She completed various tasks for the newspaper, including gathering information for stories, and printing and distributing the paper. Hénin was able to use a Gestapo truck to transport copies of La Libre Belgique before workers arrived at factories. She also helped fund and distribute other newspapers of the resistance, including Le Belge and Vrij, the Dutch-language edition of La Libre Belgique.

Additionally, Hénin sheltered Allied soldiers in her home and helped facilitate their escapes from Belgium, including four Polish airmen. In 1941, after several members of La Libre Belgique were arrested, Hénin asked journalist Fernand Kerkhofs to take over the newspaper.

== Arrest, imprisonment and execution ==
Hénin was arrested on 4 November 1941 at her home in Schaerbeek, where German soldiers found incriminating evidence, including copies of La Libre Belgique. She was imprisoned at Saint-Gilles Prison in Brussels, where she was interrogated and tortured by the Gestapo. On 24 July 1942, Hénin was transferred to a prison in Essen, and later held in Zweibrücken, Frankfurt, Kassel and Halle, before arriving in Berlin on 6 October 1943.

On 6 January 1944, Hénin appeared before the People's Court with her co-defendants Noël Abel, Roger Degueldre, Georges Maréchal, Robert Logelain, Latour and Michel Goffart. She was subsequently sentenced to death for "high treason". When asked on 8 January why she was in prison, Hénin reportedly replied "for having faithfully served my country", and said that if she was released she would place herself "at the disposal" of Belgium. Hénin was executed on 8 June 1944 at Plötzensee Prison in Berlin, a few minutes after Emmy Zehden.

== Recognition ==
In her memoirs, resistance member Louise de Landsheere wrote of Hénin: "we can only bow before this national heroine, whose name will join in history that of Gabrielle Petit and Edith Cavell".

A street in Marche-en-Famenne is named after Hénin. On 6 May 1951, a plaque in her memory was placed at her place of birth in the town; the unveiling ceremony was attended by Prince Baudouin.
