= Belgian Resistance =

World War II resistance to German occupation

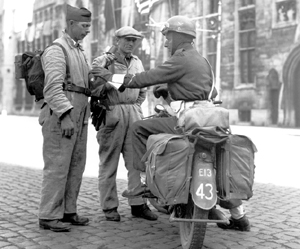
Members of the Belgian resistance with a Canadian soldier in Bruges, September 1944 (Note: Both resistance members (left) wear the black and white overalls and armband adopted by the Armée Secrète in 1944 as an official uniform of the movement.)

The Belgian Resistance (French: Résistance belge, Dutch: Belgisch verzet) collectively refers to the resistance movements opposed to the German occupation of Belgium during World War II. Within Belgium, resistance was fragmented between many separate organizations, divided by region and political stances. The resistance included both men and women from both Walloon and Flemish parts of the country. Aside from sabotage of military infrastructure in the country and assassinations of collaborators, these groups also published large numbers of underground newspapers, gathered intelligence and maintained various escape networks that helped Allied airmen trapped behind enemy lines escape from German-occupied Europe.

During the war, it is estimated that approximately five percent of the national population were involved in some form of resistance activity, while some estimates put the number of resistance members killed at over 19,000; roughly 25 percent of its "active" members.

== Background ==
=== German invasion and occupation ===
German forces invaded Belgium, which had been following a policy of neutrality, on 10 May 1940. After 18 days of fighting, the Belgian Army surrendered on 28 May and the country was placed under German military occupation. During the fighting, between 600,000 and 650,000 Belgian men (nearly 20 percent of the country's male population) served in the military. Many were made prisoners of war and detained in camps in Germany, although some were released before the end of the war. Leopold III, king and commander-in-chief of the army, also surrendered to the Germans on 28 May along with his army and was also held prisoner by the Germans. On 18 June the Belgian Government fled and arrived first in Bordeaux, France after the French government had fled to the region three days earlier. On that same day the Belgian government sent a telegram to the imprisoned Belgian king, stating their resignation to the king. Marcel-Henri Jaspar, the Belgian Minister of Health, went to London on 21 June without the permission of the government. He later gave a speech on BBC Radio on 23 June stating he would continue to fight against the Germans. Three days later the Belgian government stripped his ministerial title in reaction to the speech.

=== Growth of resistance ===
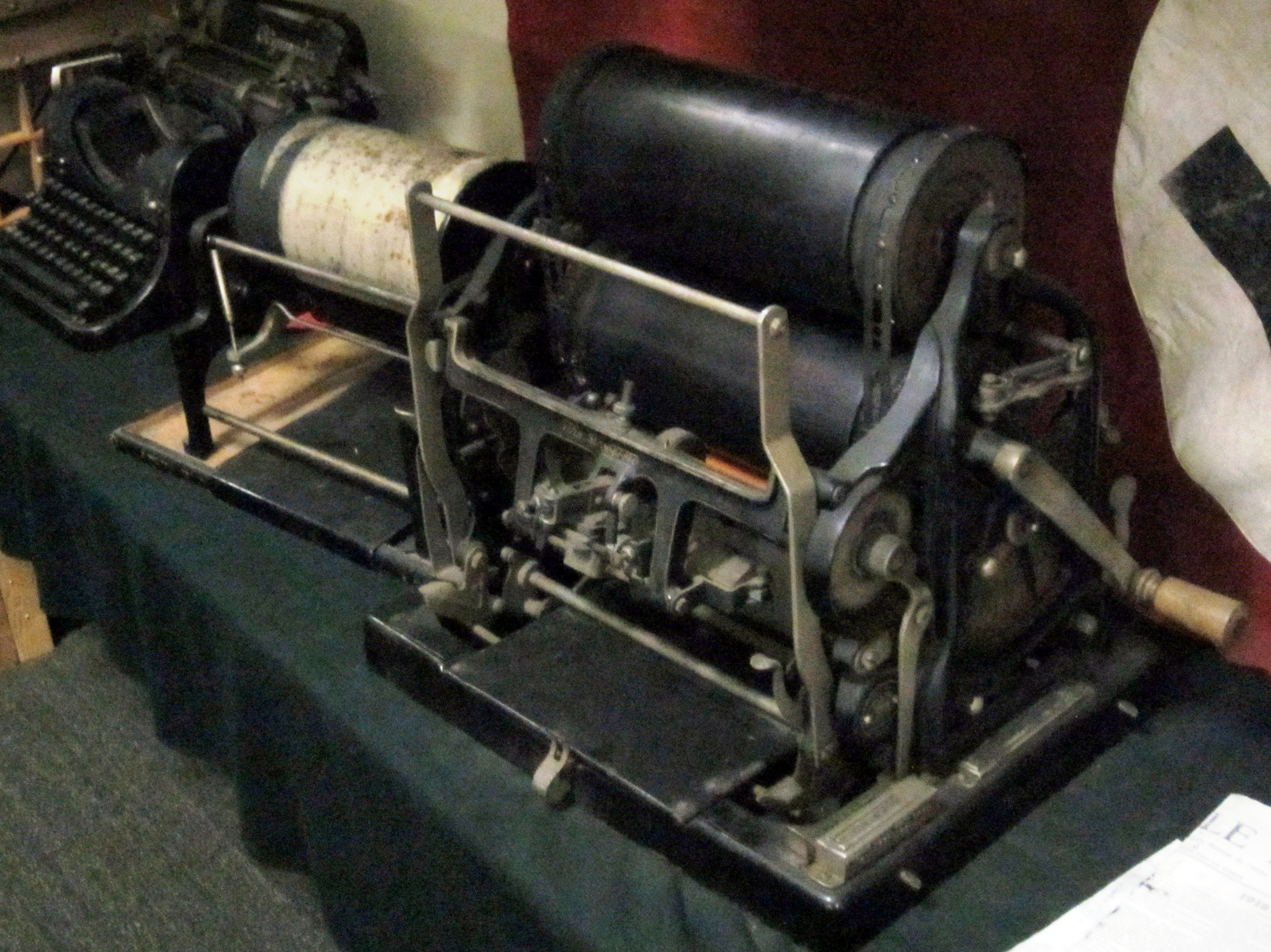
Examples of mimeograph machines used by the Belgian resistance to produce illegal newspapers and publications

Among the first members of the Belgian resistance were former soldiers, and in particular officers, who, on their return from prisoner of war camps, wished to continue the fight against the Germans out of patriotism. Nevertheless, resistance was slow to develop in the first few months of the occupation because it seemed that German victory was imminent. The German failure to invade Great Britain, coupled with aggravating German policies within occupied Belgium, especially the persecution of Belgian Jews and conscription of Belgian civilians into forced labour programmes, increasingly turned patriotic Belgian civilians from liberal or Catholic backgrounds against the German regime and towards the resistance. With the German invasion of the Soviet Union in June 1941, members of the Communist Party, which had previously been ambivalent towards both Allied and Axis sides, also joined the resistance en masse, forming their own separate groups calling for a "national uprising" against Nazi rule. During the First World War, Belgium had been occupied by Germany for four years and had developed an effective network of resistance, which provided key inspiration for the formation of similar groups in 1940.

Most of the resistance was focused in the French-speaking areas of Belgium (Wallonia and the city of Brussels), although Flemish involvement in the resistance was also significant. Around 70 percent of underground newspapers were in French, while 60 percent of political prisoners were Walloon.

== Resistance during the German occupation ==
=== Passive resistance ===
The most widespread form of resistance in occupied Belgium was non-violent. Listening to Radio Belgique broadcasts from London, which was officially prohibited by the German occupiers, was a common form of passive resistance, but civil disobedience in particular was employed. This was often carried out by Belgian government institutions that were forced to carry out the administration of the territory on behalf of the German military government. In June 1941, the City Council of Brussels refused to distribute Star of David badges on behalf of the German government to Belgian Jews.

Striking was the most common form of passive resistance and often took place on symbolic dates, such as the 10 May (anniversary of the German invasion), 21 July (National Day) and 11 November (anniversary of the German surrender in World War I). The largest was the so-called "Strike of the 100,000", which broke out on 10 May 1941 in the Cockerill steel works in Seraing. News of the strike spread rapidly and soon at least 70,000 workers came out on strike across the province of Liège. The Germans increased workers' salaries by eight percent and the strike finished rapidly. Future large-scale strikes were repressed by the Germans, although further important strikes occurred in November 1942 and February 1943.

King Leopold III, imprisoned in Laeken Palace, became a focal point for passive resistance, despite having been condemned by the government-in-exile for his decision to surrender.

=== Active resistance ===
"Though they shared a common opposition to German rule, these [resistance] groups were in other respects divided by organizational rivalries, by competition for Allied support, and by their tactics and political affiliations. Indeed, to consider the Resistance, as the term suggests, as a unitary phenomenon is in many respects misleading."

— M. Conway (2012)

Active resistance within Belgium developed from early 1941 and took several directions. Armed resistance, in the forms of sabotage or assassinations, took place, but was only part of the "active" resistance's scope of activity. Some groups had very specific forms of resistance and became extremely specialized. The Service D group, for example, had many members in the national postal service and used them to intercept letters of denunciation, warning the denounced person to flee. In this way, they succeeded in intercepting over 20,000 letters.

Membership of the active resistance, which had been quite low in the early years of the resistance, swelled exponentially during 1944 as it was joined by so-called "resisters of the eleventh hour" (résistants de la onzième heure) who could see that Allied victory was close, particularly in the months after D-Day. It is estimated that approximately five percent of the national population were involved in some form of "active" resistance during the war.

==== Structure and organisation ====
The Belgian resistance effort was extremely fragmented between various groups and never became a unified organization during the German occupation. The danger of infiltration posed by German informants meant that some cells were extremely small and localized, and although nationwide groups did exist, they were split along political and ideological lines. They ranged from the very left-wing, like the Communist Partisans Armés or Socialist Front de l'Indépendance, to the far-right, like the monarchist Mouvement National Royaliste and the Légion Belge which had been created by members of the pre-war Fascist Légion Nationale movement. However, there were also other groups like Groupe G which, though without an obvious political affiliation, recruited only from very specific demographics.

== Forms of active resistance ==
=== Sabotage and assassination ===
Belgium's strategic location meant that it constituted an important supply hub for the whole German army in Northern Europe and particularly northern France. Sabotage was therefore an important duty of the resistance. Following the Normandy landings in June 1944 on orders from the Allies, the Belgian resistance began to step up its sabotage against German supply lines across the country. Between June and September alone, 95 railroad bridges, 285 locomotives, 1,365 wagons and 17 tunnels were all blown up by the Belgian resistance. Telegraph lines were also cut and road bridges and canals used to transport material sabotaged. In one notable action, 600 German soldiers were killed when a railway bridge between La Gleize and Stoumont in the Ardennes was blown up by 40 members of the resistance, including the writer Herman Bodson. Indeed, more German troops were reportedly killed in Belgium in 1941 than in all of Occupied France. Through its sabotage activities alone, one resistance group, Groupe G, required the Germans to expend between 20 and 25 million man-hours of labour on repairing damage done, including ten million in the night of 15–16 January 1944 alone.

Assassination of key figures in the hierarchy of German and collaborationist hierarchy became increasingly common through 1944. In July 1944, the Légion Belge assassinated the brother of Léon Degrelle, head of the collaborationist Rexist Party and leading Belgian fascist. Informants and suspected double agents were also targeted; the Communist Partisans Armés claimed to have killed over 1,000 traitors between June and September 1944.

=== Clandestine press ===
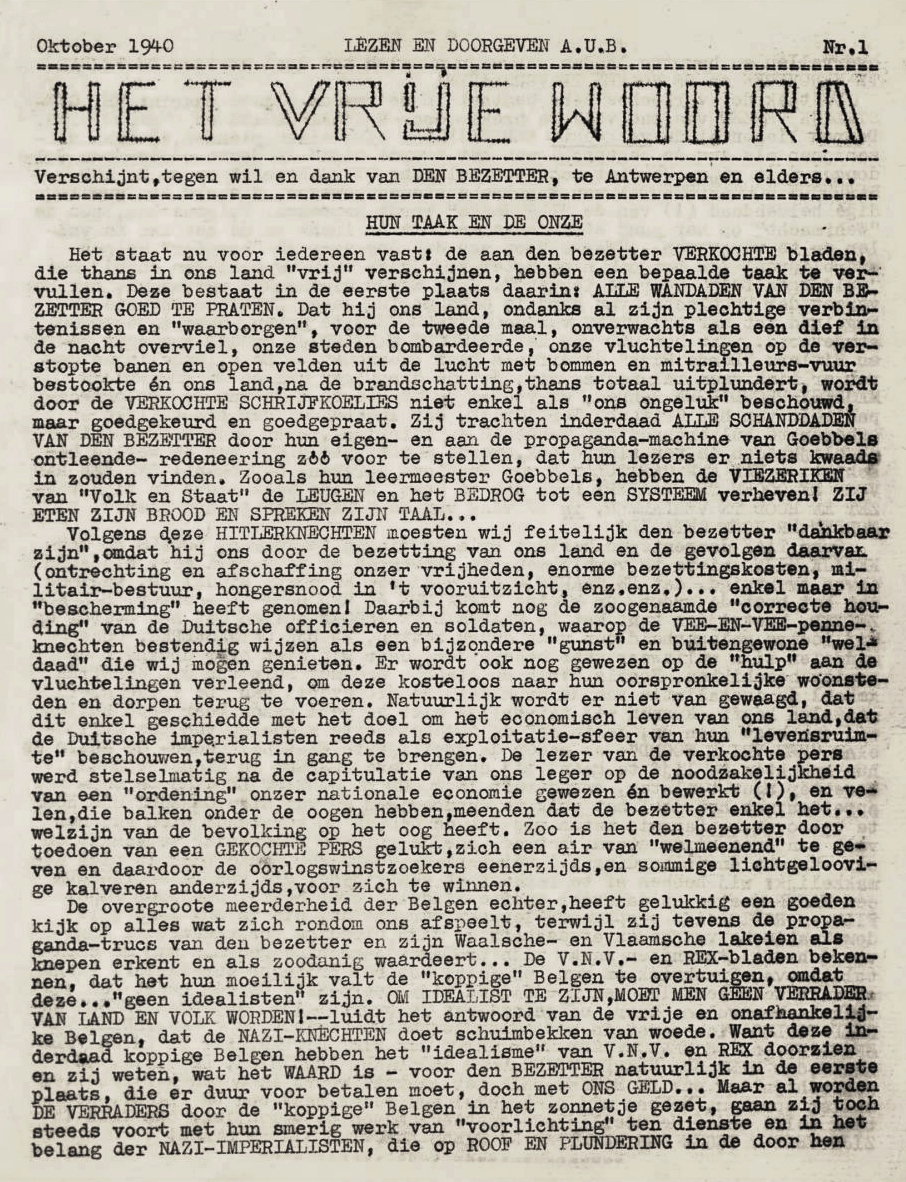
Het Vrije Woord, a typical Dutch-language underground publication, October 1940 issue.

During the occupation an underground press flourished in Belgium from soon after the Belgian defeat, with eight newspapers appearing by October 1940 alone. Much of the resistance's press focused around producing newspapers in both French and Dutch language as alternatives to collaborationist newspapers like Le Soir. At its peak, the clandestine newspaper La Libre Belgique, whose journalists included Marie-Louise Hénin and, following her arrest, Fernand Kerkhofs, was relaying news within five to six days; faster than the BBC's French-language radio broadcasts, whose coverage lagged several months behind events. Copies of the underground newspapers were distributed anonymously, with some pushed into letterboxes or sent by post. Since they were usually free, the costs of printing were financed by donations from sympathisers. The papers achieved considerable circulation, with La Libre Belgique reaching a regular circulation of 40,000 by January 1942 and peaking at 70,000, while the Communist paper, Le Drapeau Rouge, reached 30,000. Dozens of different newspapers existed, often affiliated with different resistance groups or differentiated by political stance, ranging from nationalist, Communist, Liberal or even Feminist. The number of Belgians involved in the underground press is estimated at anywhere up to 40,000 people. In total, 567 separate titles are known from the period of occupation.

The resistance also printed humorous publications and material as propaganda. In November 1943, on the anniversary of the German surrender in the First World War, the Front de l'Indépendance group published a spoof edition of the collaborationist newspaper Le Soir, satirizing the Axis propaganda and biased information permitted by the censors, which was then distributed to newsstands across Brussels and deliberately mixed with official copies of the newspaper. 50,000 copies of the spoof publication, dubbed the "Faux Soir" (or "Fake Soir"), were distributed.

=== Intelligence gathering ===
Intelligence gathering was one of the first forms of resistance to grow after the Belgian defeat and eventually developed into complex and carefully structured organizations. The Allies were also deeply reliant on the resistance to provide intelligence from the occupied country. This information focused both on German troop movements and other military information, but was also essential for keeping the Allies abreast of the attitudes and popular opinion of the Belgian public. Each network was closely organized and carried a codename. The most significant was "Clarence", led by Walthère Dewé, which had over 1,000 members feeding it information which was then communicated to London by radio. Other notable networks were "Luc" (renamed "Marc" in 1942) and "Zéro". In total 43 separate intelligence networks existed in Belgium, involving some 14,000 people. The Belgian resistance provided around 80 percent of all information received by the Allies from all resistance groups in Europe.

=== Resistance to the Holocaust ===
"Greet them [the Jews] in passing! Offer them your seat on the tram! Protest against the barbaric measures that are being applied to them. That'll make the Boches furious!"

— Extract from the underground paper La Libre Belgique of August 1942.

The Belgian resistance was instrumental in saving Jews and Roma from deportation to death camps. In April 1943, members of the resistance group, the Comité de Défense des Juifs successfully attacked the "Twentieth convoy" carrying 1,500 Belgian Jews by rail to Auschwitz in Poland. Many Belgians also hid Jews and political dissidents during the occupation: one estimate put the number at some 20,000 people hidden during the war. (Note: The number provided by the Museum van Deportatie en Verzet puts the number at 20,000 Jews, including 3,000 children. The historian Eva Fogelman supplies a figure of 20,000 adults and 8,000 children in hiding.) There was also significant low-level resistance: for instance, in June 1941, the City Council of Brussels refused to distribute Stars of David badges. Certain high-profile members of the Belgian establishment, including Queen Elizabeth and Cardinal van Roey, Archbishop of Malines, spoke out against the German treatment of Jews.

In total, 1,612 Belgians have been awarded the distinction of "Righteous Among the Nations" by the State of Israel for risking their lives to save Jews from persecution during the occupation.

=== Escape routes for Allied airmen ===
As the Allies intensified their strategic bombing campaign from 1941, the resistance began to experience a significant increase in the number of Allied airmen from the RAF and USAAF who had been shot down but evaded capture. The resistance's aim, assisted by the British MI9 organization, was to escort them out of occupied Europe and over the Pyrenees to neutral Spain where they might return to England. The best-known of these networks, the Comet Line, organized by Andrée de Jongh, involved some 2,000 resistance members and was able to escort 700 Allied airmen to Spain. The Line not only fed, housed, and provided civilian clothing for the pilots, but also forged Belgian and French identity cards and rail fares. As the airmen also needed to be hidden in civilian houses for prolonged periods of time, escape lines were particularly vulnerable. During the course of the war, 800 members of the "Comet" line alone were arrested by the Gestapo of whom 140 were executed.

== German response ==
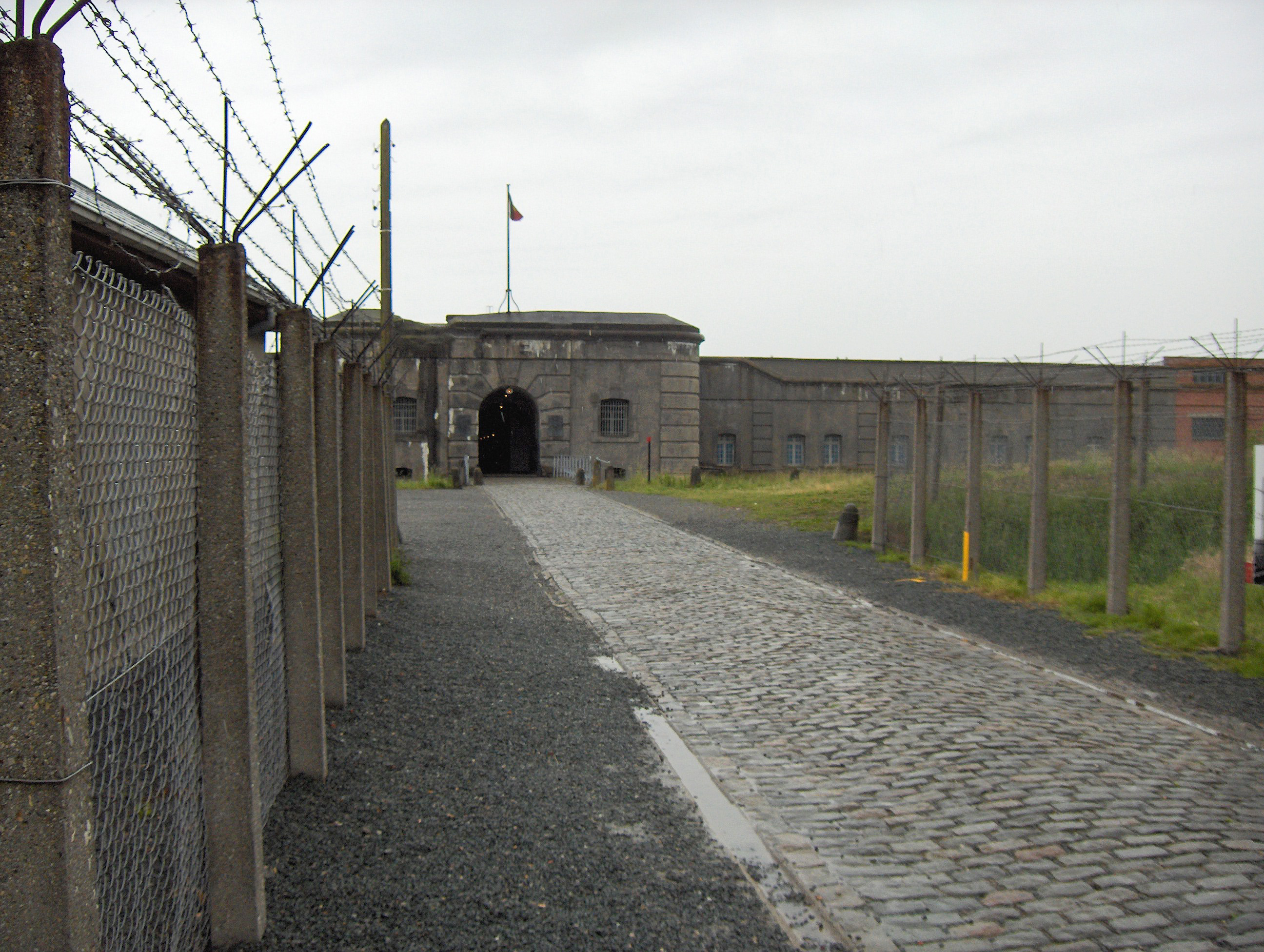
The entrance to Fort Breendonk where many captured members of the resistance were held

The German Geheime Staatspolizei ("Secret state police"), known as the Gestapo, was responsible for targeting resistance groups in Belgium. Resistance fighters who were captured could expect to be interrogated, tortured and either summarily executed or sent to a concentration camp. The Gestapo was effective at using informants within groups to betray whole local resistance networks and in examining resistance publications for clues about its place of production. 2,000 resistance members involved in underground press alone were arrested during the war. In total, 30,000 members of the resistance were captured during the war, of whom 16,000 were executed or died in captivity.

The Germans requisitioned the former Belgian army Fort Breendonk, near Mechelen, which was used for torture and interrogation of political prisoners and members of the resistance. Around 3,500 inmates passed through the camp at Breendonk where they were kept in extremely degrading conditions. Around 300 people were killed in the camp itself, with at least 98 of them dying from deprivation or torture.

Towards the end of the war, the militias of collaborationist political parties also began to participate actively in reprisals for attacks or assassinations by the resistance. These included both reprisal assassinations of leading figures suspected of resistance involvement or sympathy (including Alexandre Galopin, head of the Société Générale, who was assassinated in February 1944) or retaliatory massacres against civilians. Foremost among these was the Courcelles Massacre, a reprisal by Rexist paramilitaries for the assassination of a Burgomaster, in which 20 civilians were killed. A similar massacre also took place at Meensel-Kiezegem, where 67 were killed.

== Relations with the Allies and Belgian government in exile ==
The Belgian government in exile made its first call for the creation of organized resistance in the country from its first place of exile in Bordeaux, before its flight to London after the French surrender:

We trust fully in the power of Britain to deliver us from German bondage ... We claim the right to share in the burden and honour of this fight in the measure of our modest but not altogether negligible resources We are not defeatists ... We will have nothing to do with those faint-hearted countrymen of ours, who, despairing of the victory of the allied cause, would be willing to come to terms with the invader. We know that neither Belgium nor the Congo will be saved until Hitlerism is crushed.

— Camille Huysmans, radio broadcast, 23 June 1940

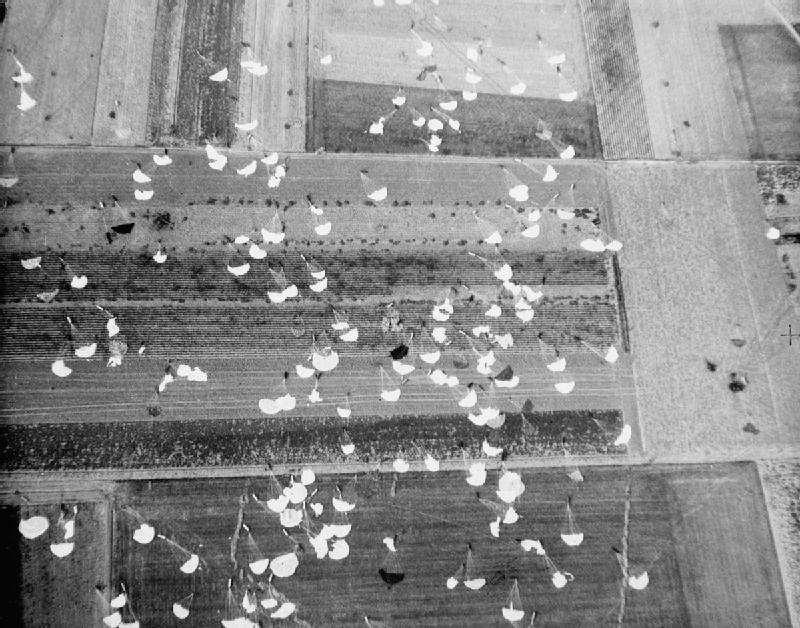
Supplies for the Resistance dropped by British aircraft in the countryside north of Brussels.

Nevertheless, the apparent isolation of the government in exile from the day-to-day situation in Belgium meant that it was viewed with suspicion by many resistance groups, particularly those whose politics differed from that of the established government. The government, for its part, was afraid that resistance groups would turn into ungovernable political militias after liberation, challenging the government's position and threatening political stability. Nevertheless, the resistance was frequently reliant on finance and drops of equipment and supplies which both the government-in-exile and the British Special Operations Executive (SOE) were able to provide. During the course of the war, the government-in-exile delivered between 124 and 245 million francs, dropped by parachute or transferred via bank accounts in neutral Portugal, to the Armée Secrète group alone, with smaller sums also distributed to other organisations.

In the early years of the war, contact with the government in exile was difficult to establish. The Légion Belge dispatched a member to try to establish contact in May 1941, it took a full year to reach London. Radio contact was briefly established in late 1941, however, the contact was extremely intermittent between 1942 and 1943, with a permanent radio connection to the Armée Secrète (codenamed "Stanley") only established in 1944.

In May 1944, the government-in-exile attempted to rebuild its relationship with the resistance by establishing a "Coordination Committee" of representatives of the major groups, including the Légion Belge, Mouvement National Belge, Groupe G and the Front de l'Indépendance. However, the committee was rendered redundant by the liberation in September.

== The Resistance during the Liberation ==
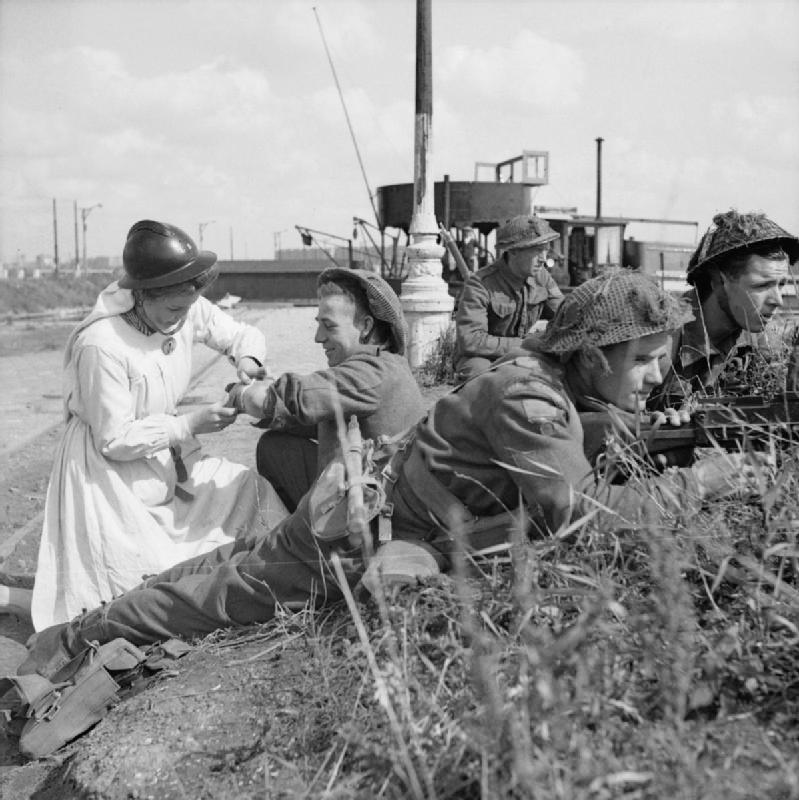
A Resistance nurse provides first aid to a British soldier during the fighting around Antwerp, 1944.

After the Normandy Landings in June 1944, the Belgian resistance increased in size dramatically. In April 1944, the Armée Secrète began to adopt an official rank hierarchy and uniform (of white overalls and armband) to be worn on missions in order to give their organization the status of an "official army".

Though they usually lacked the equipment and training to fight the Wehrmacht openly, the resistance played a key role in assisting the Allies during the liberation of Belgium in September 1944, providing information on German troop movements, disrupting German evacuation plans and participating in fighting. The resistance was particularly important during the liberation of the city of Antwerp, where the local resistance from the Witte Brigade and Nationale Koninklijke Beweging, in an unprecedented display of inter-group cooperation, assisted British and Canadian forces in capturing the highly strategic port of Antwerp intact, before it could be sabotaged by the German garrison. Across Belgium, 20,000 German soldiers (including two generals) were taken prisoner by the resistance, before being handed over to the Allies.

The Free Belgian 5th SAS was dropped by parachute into the Ardennes where it linked up with members of the local resistance during the liberation and the Battle of the Bulge.

All together, almost 4,000 members of the Armée Secrète alone were killed during the liberation.

=== Disarmament ===
Soon after the liberation, the reestablished government in Brussels attempted to disarm and demobilize the resistance. In particular, the government feared the organizations would degenerate into armed political militias which could threaten the country's political stability. In October 1944 the government ordered members of the resistance to surrender their weapons to the police and, in November, threatened to search the houses and fine those who had retained them. This provoked significant anger among resistance members, who had hoped that they would be able to continue fighting alongside the Allies in the invasion of Germany. On 25 November, a large demonstration of former resistance members took place in Brussels. As the crowds moved towards the Parliament, British soldiers fired on the crowd, which they suspected to be trying to make left-wing coup d'état. 45 people were wounded.

Nevertheless, large numbers of former members of the resistance enlisted into the regular army, where they formed around 80% of the strength of the Belgian Fusilier Battalions which served on the Western Front until VE Day.

== Legacy ==
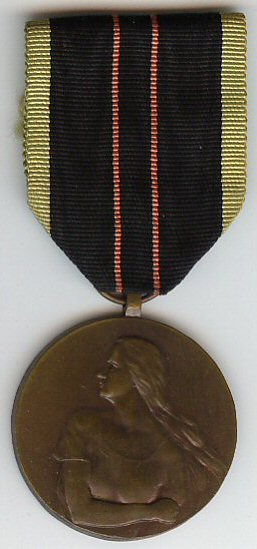
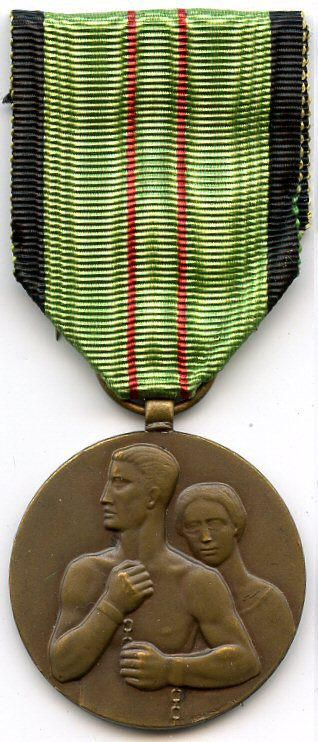
Medals awarded after the war to members of the armed (left) and civil (right) resistance in Belgium.

The Belgian resistance was praised by contemporaries for its contribution to the Allied war effort; particularly during the later period. In a letter to Lieutenant-General Pire, commander of the Armée Secrète, General Eisenhower praised the role that the Belgian resistance had played in disrupting German supply lines after D-Day. The continuing actions of the resistance stopped the Germans ever being able to use the country as a secure base, never fully becoming pacified.

The attempt of the resistance to enter mainstream politics with a formal party, the Belgian Democratic Union, failed to attract the level of support that similar parties had managed in France and elsewhere. Associations of former members were founded in the years immediately after the war and campaigned for greater recognition of the role of the resistance. The largest association, the Fondation Armée Secrète, continues to fund historical research on the role of the resistance and defending the interests of its members.

In December 1946, the government of Camille Huysmans inaugurated a medal to be awarded to former members of the resistance and bestowed various other benefits on other members, including pensions and a scheme of state-funded apprenticeships. Individuals were accorded military rank equivalent to their status in the movement during the war, entitling them to title and other privileges. Today the role of the resistance during the conflict is commemorated by memorials, plaques and road names across the country, as well as by the National Museum of the Resistance in Anderlecht.

== See also ==
- National Museum of the Resistance in Anderlecht, Belgium
- Belgium in World War II
- Comet Line
- Free Belgian Forces
- Nazi ghost train
- Österreichische Freiheitsfront
- Witte Brigade
- Service Clarence

== Bibliography ==
- Franck, Jacques (2001). "Jaspar, Marcel-Henri (Baron)" (PDF). Nouvelle Biographie Nationale (in French). Vol. 6. Brussels: Académie royale de Belgique. pp. 252–253.
- Luykx, Theo (1977). Politieke geschiedenis van België: Van 1789 tot 1944 [Political history of Belgium: from 1789 to 1944] (in Dutch). Brussels: Elsevier. ISBN 9789010410221. OCLC 3655566.
- Marie-Pierre d’Udekem d’Acoz, Pour le Roi et la Patrie, la Noblesse belge dans la Résistance, Éditions Racines, 2002
