= Herman Bodson =

Belgian scientist and resistance member

- Born: 21 December 1912; Belgium
- Died: 28 December 2001 (aged 89); Taos, New Mexico, United States American (1966-2001)
- Known for: Resistance fighter, mineralogist, author and professor

Herman Bodson (21 December 1912 – 28 December 2001) was a Belgian scientist, mineralogist and member of the Belgian resistance during the Second World War. After the war he emigrated to the United States, where he published numerous books about his experiences during the German occupation.

== Early life ==
Herman Bodson was born on 21 December 1912, the son of Alida and Fernand Bodson who was an architect. He gained a Doctor of Science in physical chemistry and was close to acquiring a master's degree in Mineralogy. When the Second World War broke out, Bodson was mobilized into the Belgian army Medical service.

== Resistance ==
After the Belgian surrender in 1940, Bodson became involved in resistance work. He initially joined the resistance group known as OMBR, but later formed a new cell in the Ardennes. As an explosives expert, Bodson was involved in numerous sabotage missions, including an attack on a German railway convoy in which 600 German soldiers were killed. He was also involved in sheltering allied airmen which had been shot down and is credited with saving the lives of 17 allied pilots. During the Battle of the Bulge, he was trapped in the besieged town of Bastogne where he assisted US forces as a medic.

For his service in the resistance he was awarded numerous Belgian medals, including the Commemorative and the Resistance Medals as well as the British King's Medal for Courage in the Cause of Freedom and American Medal of Freedom.

== Post-war career ==
After the war, Bodson worked at the Union Chimique Belge in Brussels. He married in June 1948. In 1951, Bodson and his family moved to Elisabethville in the Belgian Congo. With the backlash against Europeans following Congolese independence in 1960, the Bodson family moved first to Rhodesia and then to the United States. He had a notable collection of mineral specimens. He was a mineral dealer in Stow, Ohio before gaining a teaching job at Lake Erie College. He became a naturalized citizen in 1966.

He died on 28 December 2001.

== Publications ==
- Bodson, Herman (1994). Agent for the Resistance : A Belgian Saboteur in World War II (1. ed.). College Station: Texas A & M Univ. Press. ISBN 9780890966075.
- Bodson, Herman (2005). Downed Allied Airmen and Evasion of Capture : The role of Local Resistance networks in World War II. Jefferson, N.C. [u.a]: McFarland. ISBN 0786422165. Description and preview link.
