= La Libre Belgique (1940–1944) =

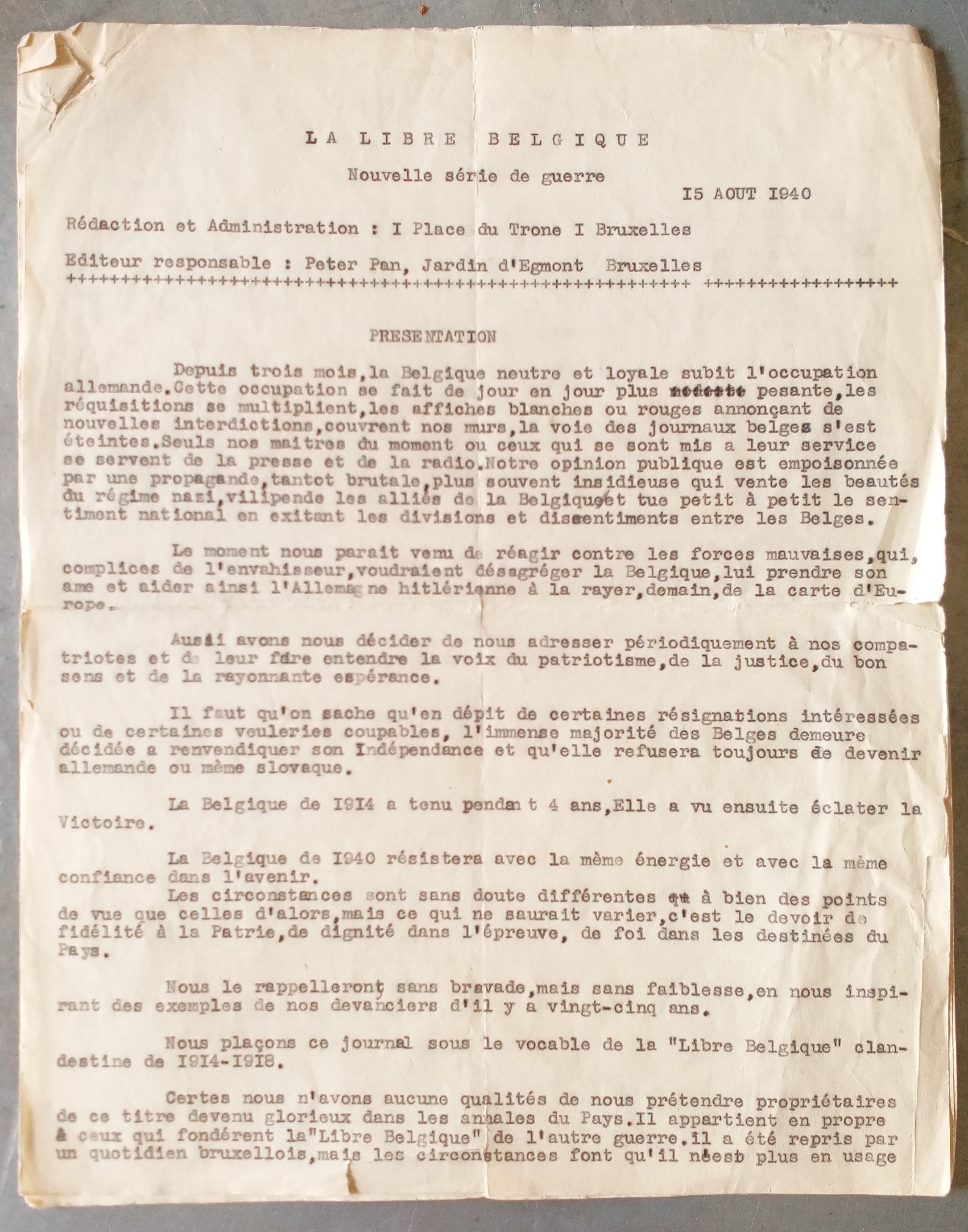
The first issue of La Libre Belgique de Peter Pan of 15 August 1940, produced with a typewriter on carbon paper. Later issues would be printed.

During World War II, La Libre Belgique (French; lit. 'The Free Belgium') was one of the most notable underground newspapers published in German-occupied Belgium. This was partly a result of the success of a newspaper with the same title that had been produced in German-occupied Belgium during World War I. Though a number of editions appeared in 1940 and 1941, the most enduring La Libre Belgique published during the World War II was the so-called "Peter Pan" edition which ran to 85 issues with a circulation of 10,000 to 30,000 each.

== Background ==
La Libre Belgique originated as a newspaper called Le Patriote (The Patriote) founded in 1884. Following the German invasion of Belgium in 1914, Le Patriote was prohibited by the German occupation authorities. It was revived in 1915 as an underground newspaper, produced illegally without German censorship, under the name La Libre Belgique (literally, The Free Belgium). During World War I, a total of 171 issues were produced and the newspaper became famous as an example of Belgian resistance.

== World War II ==
After the German invasion and occupation of Belgium in May 1940, the name La Libre Belgique was revived by a number of underground newspapers produced in occupied Belgium, especially in the first months of the war.

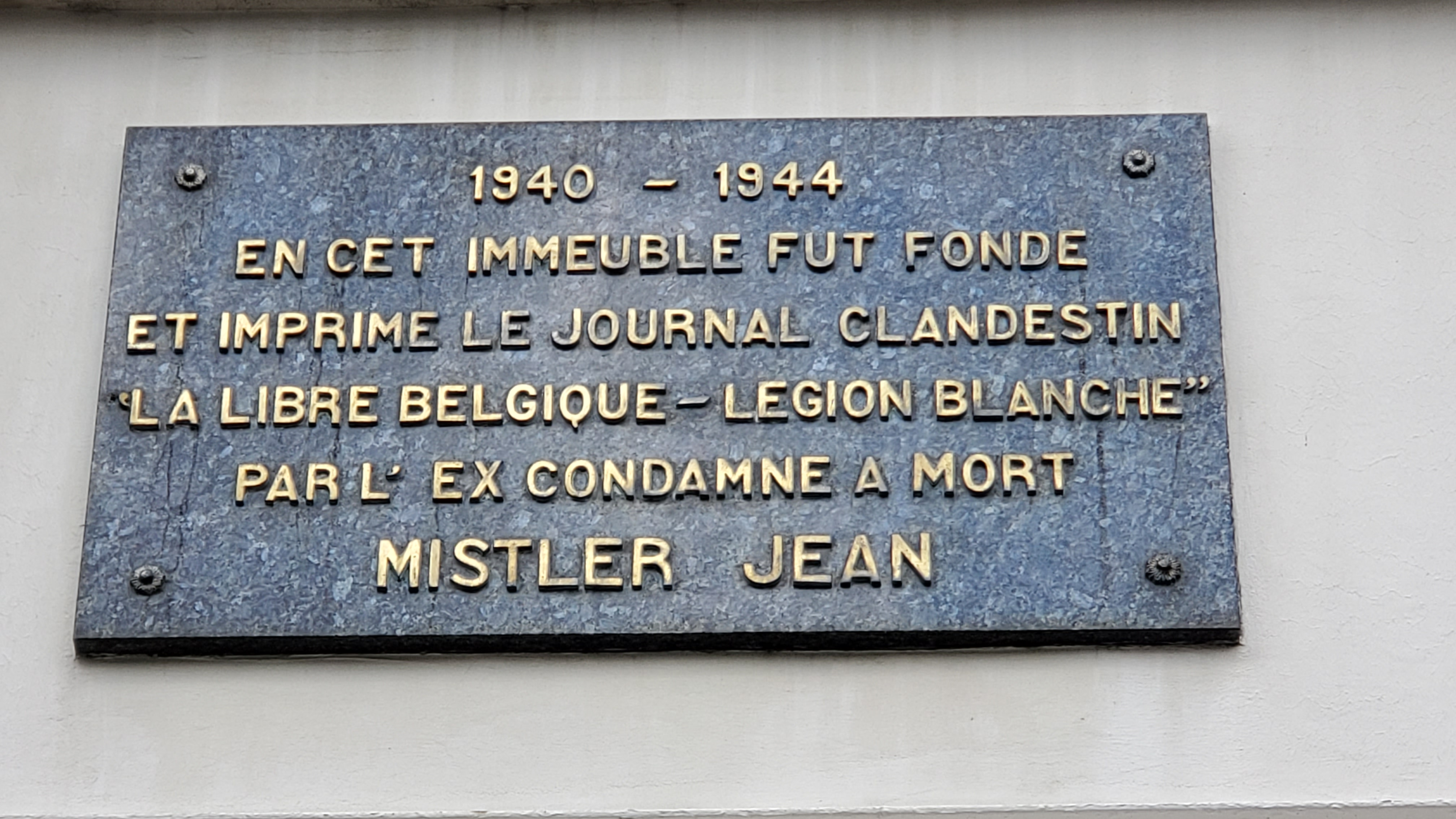
Plaque 82 Thomas Vinçotte street in Schaerbeek.

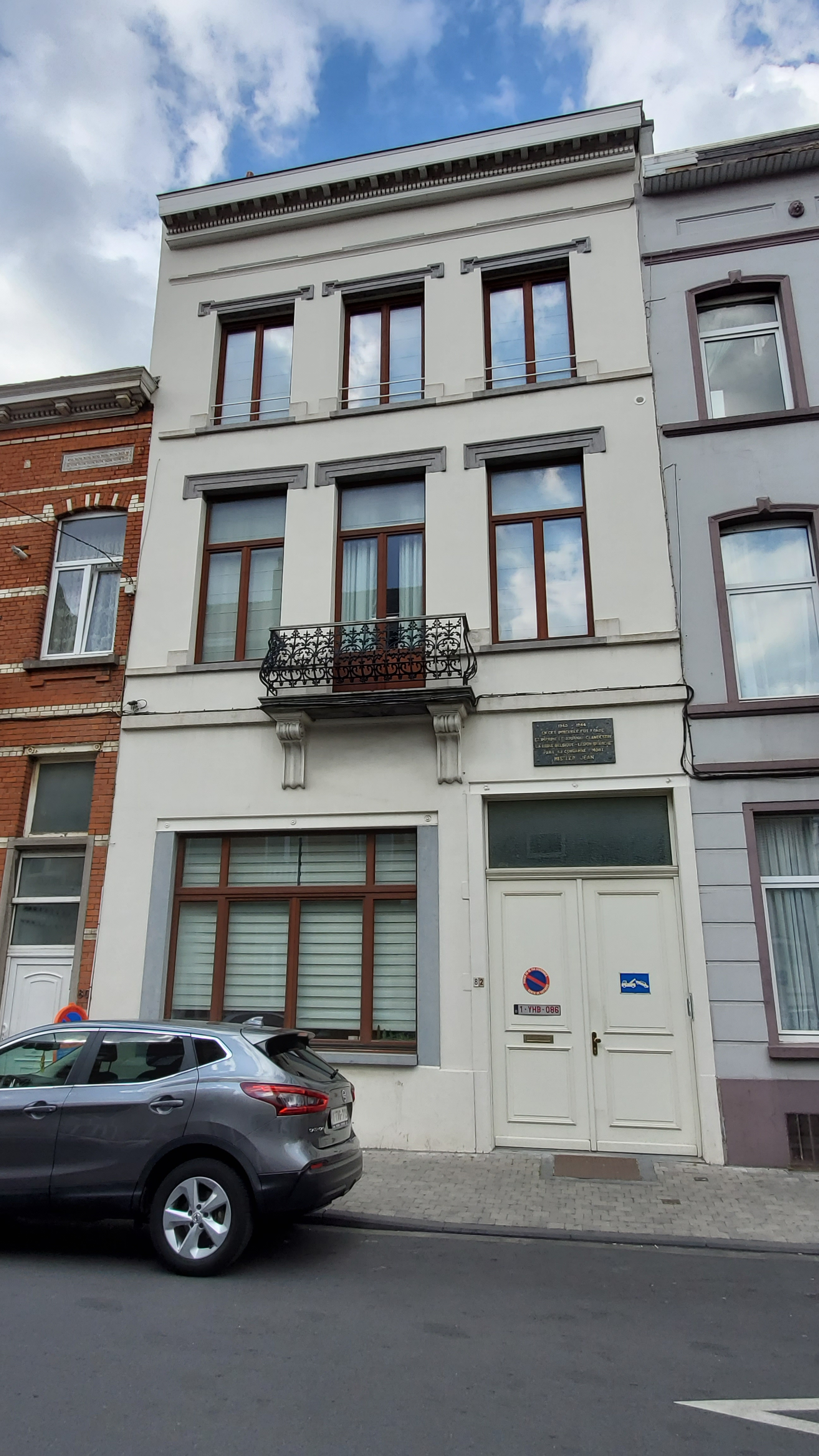
82 Thomas Vinçotte street in Schaerbeek, district of Brussels.

In the summer of 1940, a number of alternative La Libre Belgique titles appeared independently of one another, such as La Libre Belgique ressuscitée en 1940. Other editions included:

- La Libre Belgique. Antwerpsche oorlogsuitgave
- La Libre Belgique. Bulletin de propaganda patriotique régulièrement irrégulier
- La Libre Belgique. Edition Forestoise
- La Libre Belgique. Journal de patriotisme belge, ne se soumettant à aucune censure
- La Libre Belgique. Nouvelle série de guerre
- La Libre Belgique. Nouvelle série de guerre. Edition de Province
- La Libre Belgique. Nouvelle série de guerre. Fondée le 15 août 1940. Reprise le 28 mai 1942

The most important La Libre Belgique, however, was founded in Brussels by two lawyers, Paul Struye and Robert Logelain in August 1940. It is generally known as La Libre Belgique de Peter Pan after the fictional name of the editor given on the paper's masthead. It was produced by supporters of the centre-right Catholic Party and many of the people involved in its production came from legal and financial circles within Brussels. It soon became associated with the "Zero" resistance group. The newspaper was pro-British and supported both Belgian government in exile and King Leopold III.

In total, 85 issues of La Libre Belgique de Peter Pan were produced during the occupation, with the circulation of between 10,000 and 30,000 copies. It was one of the largest and most influential of the Belgian underground newspapers that appeared in the same period. Between April 1941 and the Liberation in September 1944, the paper printed regular bi-monthly editions. Most editions ranged from four to eight pages, including photographs and illustrations.

Marie-Louise Hénin, a dentist who helped publish and distribute La Libre Belgique, was arrested by the Gestapo in 1941 after copies of the paper were found in her home. She was later executed in 1944.

The clandestine La Libre Belgique was replaced by a regular edition after the Liberation of Brussels in September 1944.
