= Groupe G =

Belgian resistance group during WWII

General Sabotage Group of Belgium Groupe G
- Groupe Général de Sabotage de Belgique
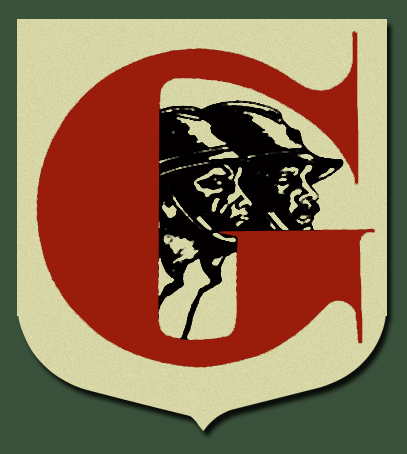
- Leaders: Andre Wendelen (founder), Jean Burgers (founder)
- Dates active: 1942 – September 1944
- Active regions: Across Belgium
- Size: 4,046 (total)
- Wars: the Belgian Resistance (World War II)

The General Sabotage Group of Belgium (French: Groupe Général de Sabotage de Belgique), more commonly known as Groupe G after its leader Jean Burgers's codename "Gaby", was a Belgian resistance group during the Second World War, founded in 1942. Groupe G's activities concentrated particularly on sabotage of German rail lines and it is widely considered to have been the most effective resistance group in Belgium during the period.

== History ==
Groupe G was founded in 1942, by a group of former students of the Free University of Brussels and its ranks were mainly filled by students. Unusually for a resistance cell of the period, the unit's activities were not restricted to a single area as it operated across the country.

=== Actions ===
In 1944, Groupe G was responsible for a co-ordinated action on all high voltage electric lines in Belgium. This action alone is estimated to have cost German forces around 10 million man-hours of repairs before the communications were restored.
