= National Royalist Movement =

National Royalist Movement Mouvement National Royaliste Nationale Koninklijke Beweging
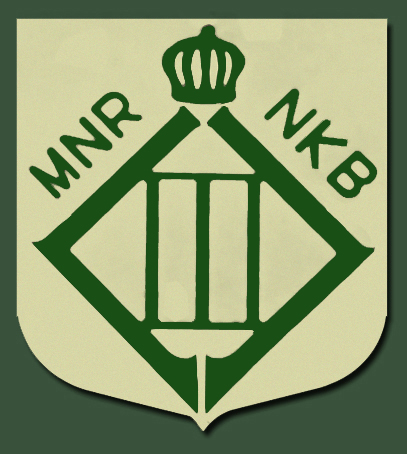
- Insignia of the MNR, based on the monogram of Leopold III
- Leaders: Eugène Mertens de Wilmars (1940-42); Ernest Graff
- Dates active: 1940-1944
- Active regions: Brussels and Flanders
- Ideology: Royalism; Belgian nationalism Authoritarianism; Corporatism
- Size: 8,527 (total)
- Wars: the Belgian Resistance (World War II)

The National Royalist Movement (French: Mouvement national royaliste (MNR), Dutch: Nationale Koningsgezinde Beweging or Nationale Koninklijke Beweging (NKB)) was a group within the Belgian Resistance in German-occupied Belgium during World War II. It was active chiefly in Brussels and Flanders and was the most politically right-wing of the major Belgian resistance groups.

== Activities during World War II ==
The MNR was founded in the town of Aarschot in German-occupied Belgium soon after the Belgian defeat of May 1940 by former members of the far-right Catholic, authoritarian Rexist Party. As an organisation, it had a strongly nationalist stance and was led by Eugène Mertens de Wilmars, a former admirer of the fascist, Leon Degrelle. The MNR wanted Belgium to become an authoritarian dictatorship under the rule of King Leopold III.

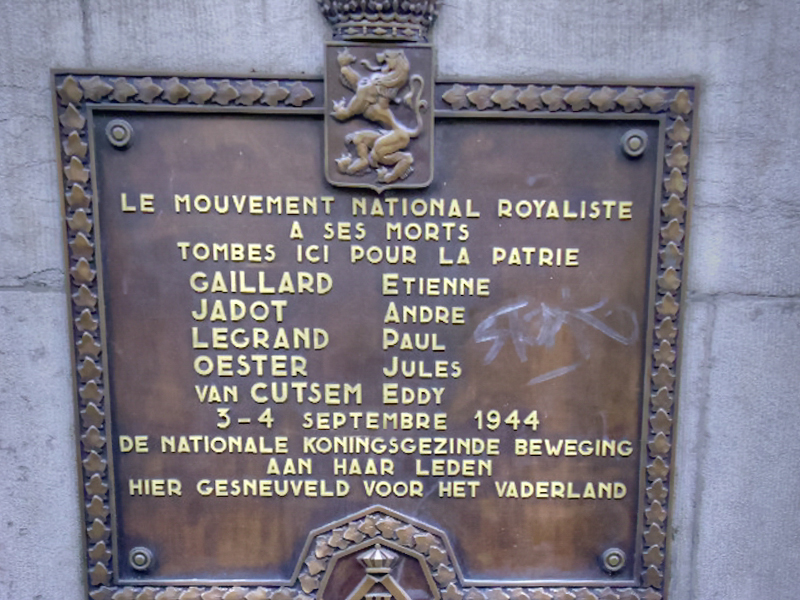
Memorial plaque on the Rue de la Régence, Brussels commemorating five MNR members killed during the liberation of the city

In July 1941, the German occupation authorities became suspicious of the MNR and it was forced into hiding. After the arrest of Mertens de Wilmars in May 1942, it became overtly anti-German and began to engage in resistance activities. The group produced underground newspapers (including the Dutch language newspaper Vrije Volk) and collected military intelligence. The MNR also provided help to Jews hiding from German persecution, Allied pilots shot down in occupied Europe and Belgian workers avoiding labour service in Germany.

In collaboration with the Secret Army and the Witte Brigade, the MNR participated in the capture of the Port of Antwerp shortly before the Allied liberation in September 1944. The operation prevented the Germans from destroying the installations and provided the Allies with access to their first intact deep-sea port.

160 members of the MNR were executed or died in Nazi camps. Around 100 were killed in action during the liberation of the Port of Antwerp in September 1944. A monument to five members of the group killed during the liberation of Brussels is visible next to the Royal Museums of Fine Arts.

== Post-war years and Eldrie ==
Members of the MNR were involved in the founding of Eldrie (L III, a reference to Leopold III), another far-right royalist group with characteristics of a secret society. In its internal documents, Eldrie professed armed violence as a means to deter communism and reinforce the autocratic role of the monarch. A May 1950 report by the intelligence agent André Moyen – who was himself involved in a larger Belgian stay-behind network – indicated to minister Albert De Vleeschauwer that in case of an insurrection, Eldrie would join the ranks of the Gendarmerie to suppress it.

Both Eldrie and the MNR came under investigation for possible involvement in the August 1950 assassination of Communist Party leader Julien Lahaut. In 1961, weapons were found in the domiciles of multiple Eldrie figureheads, including its leader Bob Van Steenlandt. This led to the arrest of Van Steenlandt alongside Stan Landuyt and André De Craene for alleged complicity in the murder of Lahaut. However, they were released shortly after due to a lack of evidence.

The MNR lobbied the city of Leuven for several years to erect a monument to its fighters. This monument was eventually built in 1959 by sculptor Willem De Backer.
