= Louis Collard =

Belgian politician and Nazi collaborationist (1914–1947)

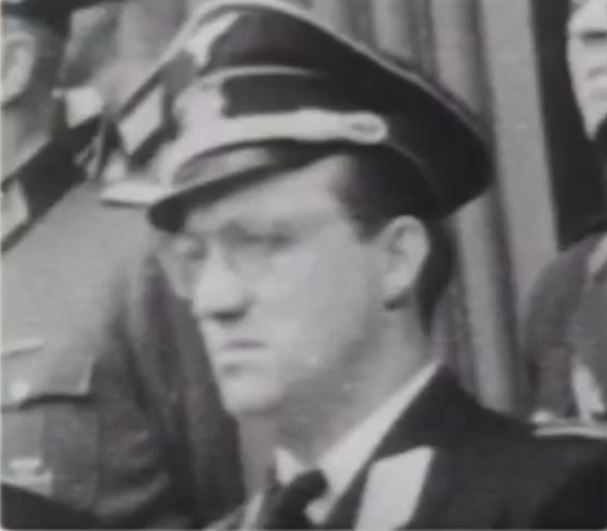

Leader of the Rexist Party
- In office August 1944 – 30 March 1945
- Preceded by: Victor Matthys
- Succeeded by: none

Personal details
- Born: Marie-Joseph Collard; 9 August 1915 Ans, Belgium
- Died: 10 November 1947 (aged 32) Charleroi, Belgium
- Cause of death: Execution by firing squad
- Known for: Politician, propagandist

Marie-Joseph Collard (9 August 1915 – 10 November 1947), known as Louis Collard, was a Belgian Walloon soldier, nationalist, and politician who served as both deputy and acting leader of the Rexist Party. After World War II, he was executed for collaboration with Nazi Germany and organizing the assassination of political opponents during the German occupation of Belgium.

== Biography ==
=== Early life ===
Born in Ans, Belgium, and educated in a Catholic college, Collard received the typical education of a young member of the bourgeoisie. He completed his military service in the Belgian Army, during which he obtained the rank of quartermaster sergeant. The great economic uncertainty and turmoil of the 1930s marked his path, and despite his privileged education, he drifted without a clear objective.

=== Rexist Party, 1936–1939 ===
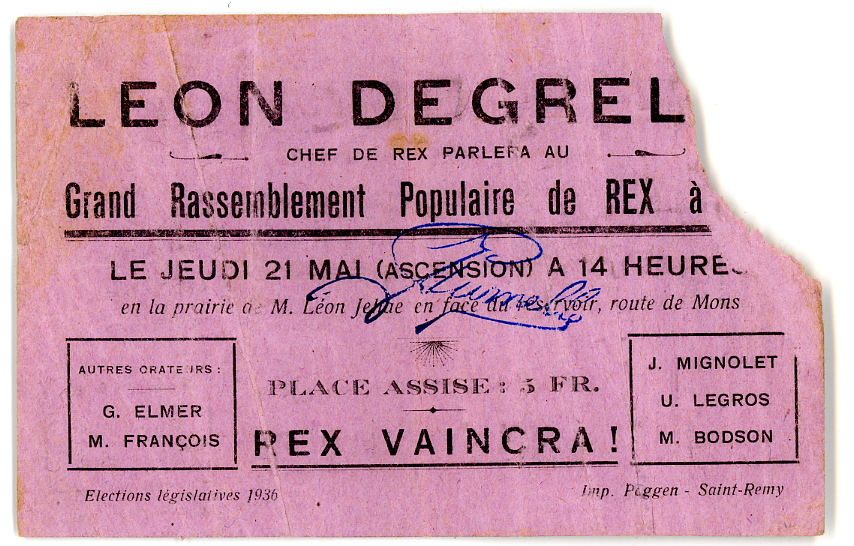
An entry ticket for a Rexist Party gathering — probably organized by Louis Collard — in 1936.

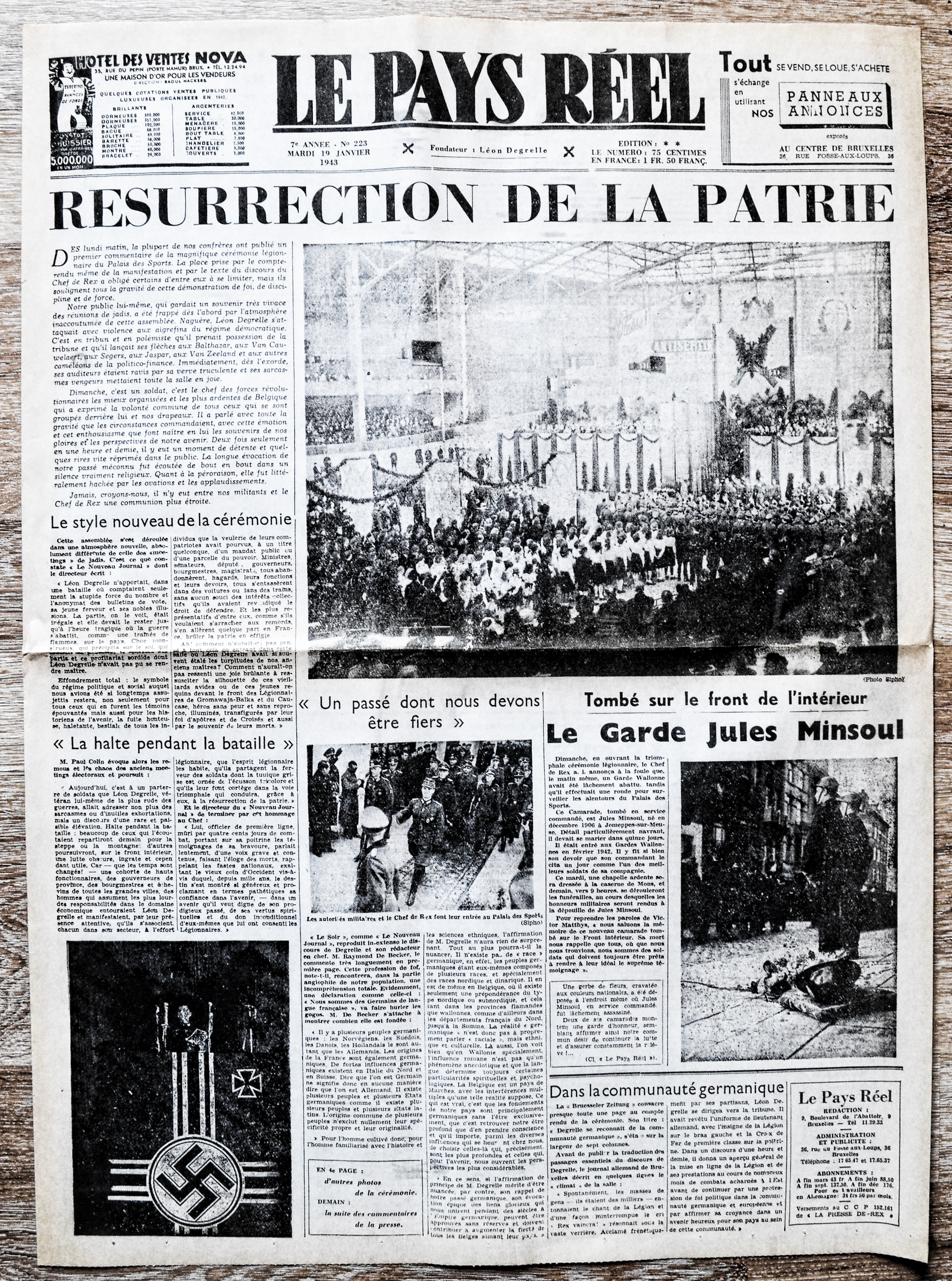
The front page of the 19 January 1936 edition of the newspaper Le Pays Reel, for which Louis Collard was an editor in 1936.

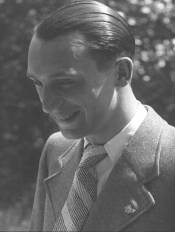
Victor Matthys was the interim leader of the Rexist Party from 1941 to 1944.

Collard was among the Rexist Party's first supporters. Despite serving only as secretary of the party at the time, he played a major role in the unexpected Rexist electoral triumph of 1936, in which the party obtained 11.49% of the seats and took charge of the Belgian province of Luxembourg. He subsequently joined the leadership of the movement, and in 1936 became responsible for organizing meetings as head of the party's meetings department. He organized large Rexist mass rallies during the winter of 1936–1937. A tireless worker despite criticism that he lacked organizational skills, Collard then took charge of Rexist Party leader Léon Degrelle's main public rallies. At the same time, he worked as an editor at the party newspaper Le Pays Réel ("The Real Country").

On 12 December 1936, Collard was placed under arrest for the theft of documents from a file in the registry of the Brussels Criminal Court. On 1 May 1938, he was summoned to appear before the court and accused of receiving stolen documents and violating professional secrecy for having diverted documents from a registry file in order to publish them as photographic reproductions in the Rexist press. Defended by Maître Waraux, he was presented as a young man proud to have obtained his first assignments for the Rexist Party and eager to serve the movement. The 20th Criminal Chamber ultimately sentenced him to eight days in prison with a three-year suspended sentence and a fine of 182 Belgian francs.

=== Interim period, 1939–1942 ===
Around 1939, as the Rexist Party's fortunes and influence declined, Collard withdrew from the movement. He worked briefly for the Sarma department store before being recalled to service in the Belgian Army. World War II began when Nazi Germany invaded Poland on 1 September 1939. Germany invaded and conquered Belgium in May 1940, and German forces captured Collard. With Belgium under German occupation, he was released from a prisoner-of-war camp in October 1940. Although he showed no desire to rejoin the Rexist Party, his ideology remained intact. He applied for a job at the Commissariat aux prix et aux salaires ("Prices and Wages Commissariat"), a Belgian public administrative service headed by Paul Beeckman, leader of the Vlaamsch Nationaal Verbond ("Flemish National Union"), which was close to the New Order movement. The Commissariat did not hire him, and he returned to Liège, where his only collaborationist activity was selling construction materials to the Germans.

=== Rexist Party, 1942–1945 ===
==== Meteoric rise ====
In September 1942, the pro-Rexist industrialist Van Reck agreed to finance the salary of an additional employee in the Rexist Party's political department, which was headed by José Streel. The department chose Collard for the position, and he took on his responsibilities with energy. At the end of 1942, Rex's interim leader, Victor Matthys, reorganized the headquarters into federations of hierarchical departments, placing the political department at the top of the organizational chart, occupying a dominant position relative to the other departments. Matthys appointed Léon Brunet, a notary, pre-war Rexist senator, and first alderman of Greater Brussels, to head the department to reassure skeptics after Streel's departure. However, Brunet took little interest in the Rexist bureaucracy and left the effective supervision of the department to Collard, whose organizational talents led to his appointment as deputy department head under Brunet.

Within six months, Collard surpassed his rivals and became Matthys's privileged advisor and confidant, playing a central role in Rexist Party initiatives of 1943. He established himself as the third-most powerful man in the party after Matthys and Degrelle, and he managed 60 employees. In 1943 and 1944, Collard dominated the Rex leadership and was described as the movement's "éminence grise" by former Rexist Henry Marcovitz. According to Marcovitz, Collard used his influence over Matthys, who by then no longer had any effective role in party affairs. The journalist Raymond De Becker also supports this thesis, but the historian Philip Rees disagrees, arguing that the Rexist movement and its collaborators disavowed Matthys, who openly and directly gave his place to Collard. In any case, Streel, Matthys and Degrelle all recognized Collard's qualities as a dynamic and talented worker.

==== Infiltration of government ====
Collard, Matthys, and their collaborators had long understood that exploitation of the recruiting base of the Walloon Legion — a combat unit initially of the German Army and later of the Waffen SS composed of French-speaking Belgian collaborators that fought against the Soviet Union on the Eastern Front — was their only reasonable hope of establishing their power on a large scale in Belgium. Streel initiated this work and Collard continued it: He made Rex's political department's organization more structured and efficient and transformed Rexist policy, focusing it solely on infiltrating local government administrations. This policy of occupying positions of public responsibility originated solely from Collard's political department, and Matthys's elevation of the department's status to the highest level of the party's bureaucracy meant that Collard became the principal architect of — and the most enthusiastic of all the Rexists regarding — the idea of pursuing a policy of infiltration.

By the autumn of 1943, the political department had established a vast file covering all government personnel in Belgium, based on close relations it maintained with the Walloon cabinet at the Belgian Ministry of the Interior, and Collard visited Secretary-General of the Interior and Health Gérard Romsée at least once a week. This cooperation allowed Rex to select activists likely to be appointed to various positions within the Ministry of the Interior; in fact, relations between the Rexist political department and the cabinet became so good that the cabinet directly approached Collard to ask him to fill vacant positions with Rexist militants himself. Thanks to this policy, according to a Rexist report from the end of 1943, one in eight municipalities in French-speaking Belgium was under Rexist control. The local infiltration strategy particularly targeted the most populated municipalities, such as Charleroi, La Louvière, and Liège, where, according to the report, 70% of the French-speaking population resided in municipalities run by Rexists.

Collard had expressed as early as 1942 a desire to control municipal police services by infiltrating them, considering this an absolute priority for transforming towns and villages into safe havens for the Rexist movement. To this end, he promoted numerous Rexist police officers and facilitated the appointment of pro-German police officers by municipal councils Rex had infiltrated. The Rexist Party even went so far as to offer bonuses to police officers who distinguished themselves in fighting against the Belgian Resistance to the German occupation. Despite all the efforts the Rexists made to control the police, the results were disappointing, and their hope of controlling the gendarmerie faded. The pro-Rexist gendarmes became isolated and demoralized in the face of their more numerous Anglophile counterparts.

==== Rexist repression ====
In 1943, as many Rexists began to feel threatened by the Belgian Resistance and Belgian collaboration with the Germans was showing signs of weakness, Matthys and Collard considered creating a special police force to protect Rexist mayors and aldermen. To this end, they approached Richard Jungclaus, the Higher SS and Police Leader in Belgium and Northern France, and proposed the creation of a Rexist bodyguard unit operating under the protection of SS forces stationed in Belgium. Jungclaus accepted this proposal in order to increase the number of men under his command and strengthen SS ties with the Rexist Party. On 20 November 1943, Collard negotiated an agreement with Jungclaus leading to the creation of the Étendard de Protection Paul Colin ("Paul Colin Protection Standard") unit, named in honor of Paul Colin, a Rexist journalist assassinated in April 1943 but more commonly known as "Formation B." The unit became operational at Namur in January 1944 and consisted of approximately 300 men operating under Rexist command, which in turn was under the overall responsibility of the SS.

On 3 January 1944, Matthys decided to reorganize the Rexist Party and made Collard secretary of the party's general staff. Collard also retained his position as head of the political department, allowing him to supervise directly all of the party's central offices. With the reorganization, Matthys adopted a more presidential role, leaving Collard with total responsibility for Rexist Party headquarters.

Anticipating an Allied invasion of Europe and the potential for an uprising by the Belgian Resistance, the Rexist Party leaders decided to create "Service K" to protect members of the movement. Despite these measures, Collard remained firmly committed to his ideology. In a memo distributed to local Rexist officers, he asserted that the security measures were proof of realism and a Rexist commitment to fight and win. He predicted that German forces, with Rexist help, would crush any Belgian Resistance attempt at an uprising and that the Rexist Party would soon gain considerable power. It is difficult to determine whether these statements were simply propaganda or whether Collard and the Rexist Party's acting chief of staff actually believed them. At his post-World War II trial for collaborationism, Matthys said that this confidence was based on a foolish blindness resulting largely from the fantasies of previous years.

Faced with increasing pressure and attempts by many Rexists to change sides, Collard warned in March 1944 that communicating details of Rexist activities to people outside the movement amounted to "pure and simple treason."

In 1944, Degrelle directed Matthys to draw up a list of 40,000 Belgians for deportation to Germany to work in German factories. Matthys refused to carry out these orders, leading Degrelle to turn directly to Collard on 13 May 1944. Collard negotiated with Degrelle to reduce the number of names to 10,000 and ultimately compiled between 6,000 and 7,000 names for deportation. However, the Allied invasion of Normandy on 6 June 1944 and the subsequent advance of Allied forces prevented the Rexist Party from handing the names over to the Germans.

In the final months of the German occupation of Belgium, many observers described the atmosphere in the country as one of civil war, marked by fratricidal hatred. Several hundred Rexists were killed, including Édouard Degrelle, brother of the party leader, on 8 July 1944, prompting the party general staff under Collard to carry out a bloody repression under the banner of "counterterrorism." Although Collard — recently appointed chief of staff of the party militia — did not carry out these assassinations personally, he coordinated and encouraged them by mobilizing Formation B.

In July 1944, Matthys decided to withdraw to his home town, Anderlecht, leaving Collard to lead the Rexist Party during the final months of the German occupation of Belgium. Collard, a skilled but domineering administrator, exercised absolute control over the Rex Party bureaucracy and threatened the party staff at will. His unpredictable and aggressive nature intensified. Evidence of this was his sudden marriage in June 1944 to a young representative of the Rexist Party women's organization, Huguette De Foiches, whom he appointed head of the École Marie de Bourgogne. His use of an artificial stimulant exacerbated his erratic behavior, provoking fits of irrational anger in him. The Rexist movement thus found itself entirely in the hands of a young despot absorbed by work and under the influence of drugs.

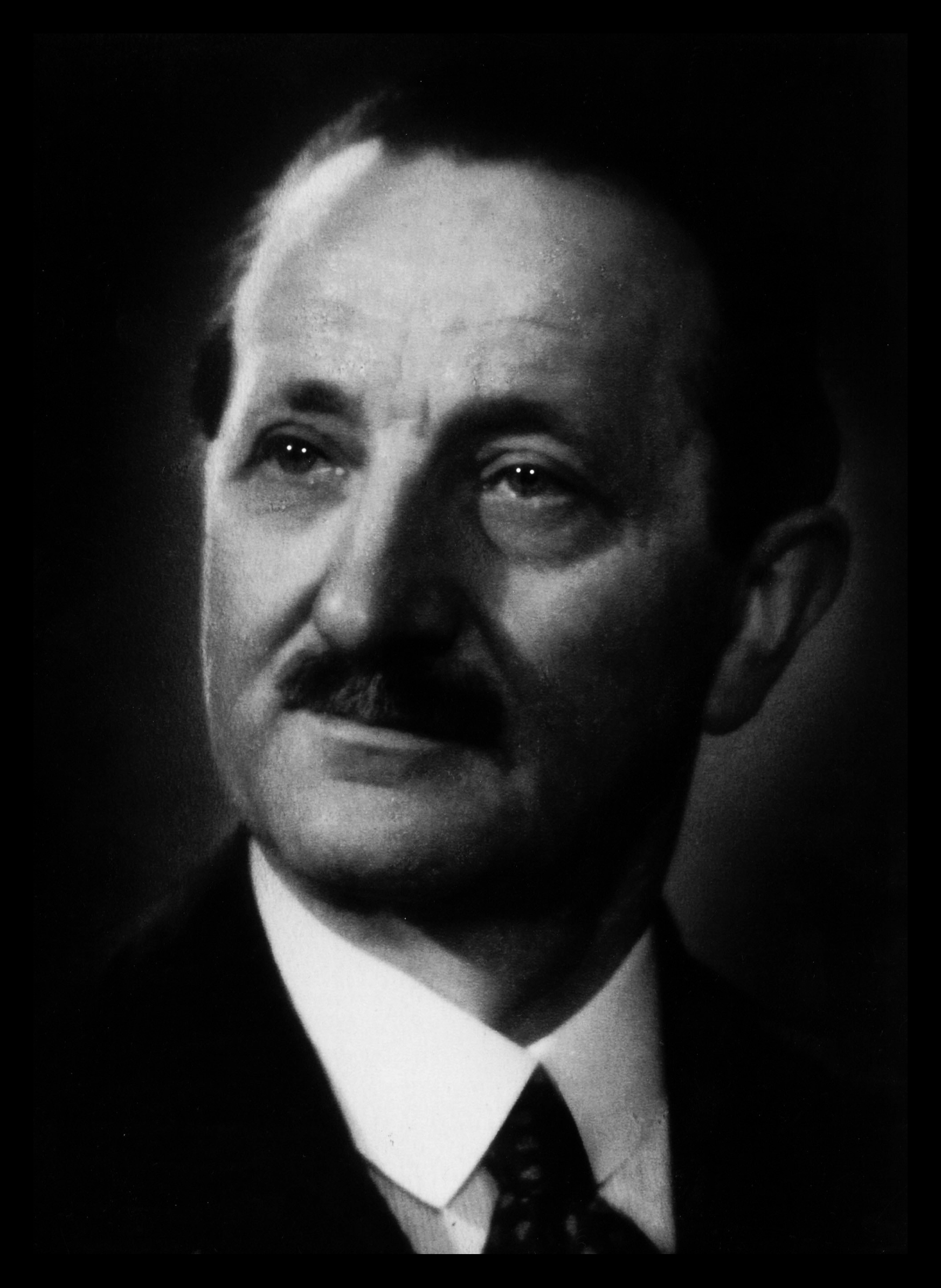
Louis Braffort (1886–1944), president of the Brussels bar association, was assassinated by the Rexists under Louis Collard's orders in August 1944.

Instead of focusing on protecting Rexist sympathizers, knowing that defeat was inevitable, the Rexist leadership opted for one last act of violence. It announced a time for "revolutionary action" at the Palais des Beaux-Arts ("Centre for Fine Arts") in Brussels on 13 August 1944, triggering an escalation of violence and serial assassinations. These culminated in the Courcelles massacre, the killing of 27 civilians on near Courcelles, Belgium, on 17–18 August 1944 orchestrated and endorsed by the Rexist Party leadership — and therefore by Collard. Subsequently, upon learning of an attack on George Dubois, Degrelle's lawyer, Collard ordered the arrest of several prominent jurists, including the head of the Brussels bar association, Louis Braffort. Despite Dubois's pleas to end the bloodshed, Collard persisted, and Braffort was beaten and shot dead in a wood near Brussels. During his post-World War II trial, Matthys said that he had not been aware of many of these crimes and claimed to have ceased all Rexist Party activity after the Courcelles killings, which largely were orchestrated by Collard.

Allied forces liberated Belgium between September 1944 and February 1945, and Matthys and Collard fled to Germany. On 30 March 1945, Degrelle, Matthys, and Collard met in Germany and officially dissolved the Rexist movement.

=== Post-World War II ===
World War II ended in Germany's defeat in early May 1945. In Germany, Matthys and Collard fled toward Switzerland, probably via Hanover and its surroundings, where Collard had established a headquarters under his command in 1944. Turned back at the Swiss border, they headed toward the Austrian Alps. Matthys was captured, while Collard managed to escape. In Belgium, he was wanted for his actions as the director of Formation B and as an organizer and instigator of assassinations during the German occupation. Notably, he was accused of orchestrated the assassination of police officers in a police station in Forest, Belgium, on 28 February 1944 as well as the assassinations of Alexandre Galopin, the Servais couple François Bovesse and Désiré Horrent, Jules Hiernaux, and Louis Braffort, and of having ordered the Courcelles massacre. He was sentenced to death in absentia but was not arrested until February 1946, when the Belgian State Security Service found him in Innsbruck, Austria, in the company of his wife Huguette and 20 Belgian SS members. Brought back to Belgium, he was placed in the custody of the military auditors in charge of the investigation to await his trial.

=== Trials ===
==== Assassination of Jules Hiernaux ====
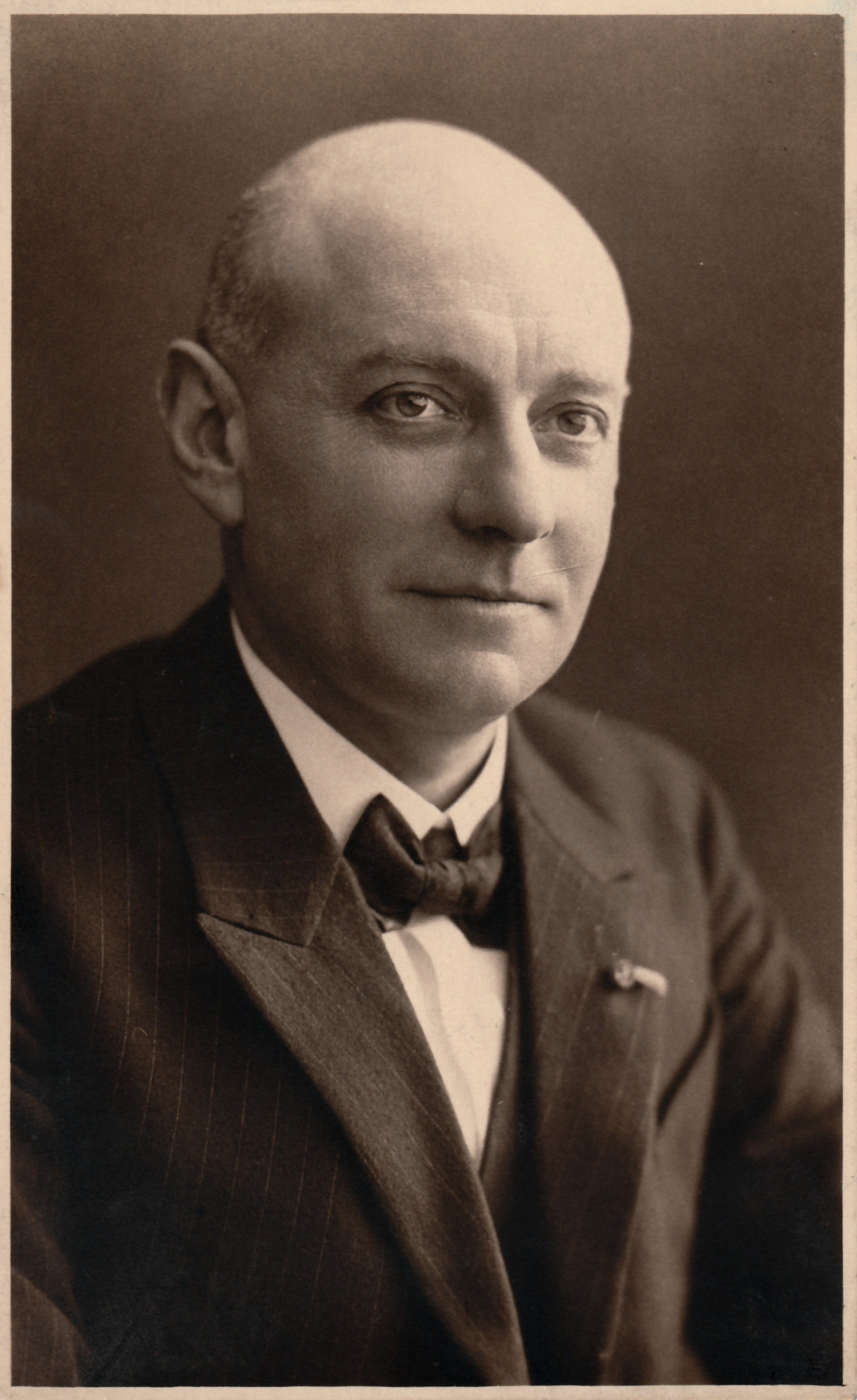
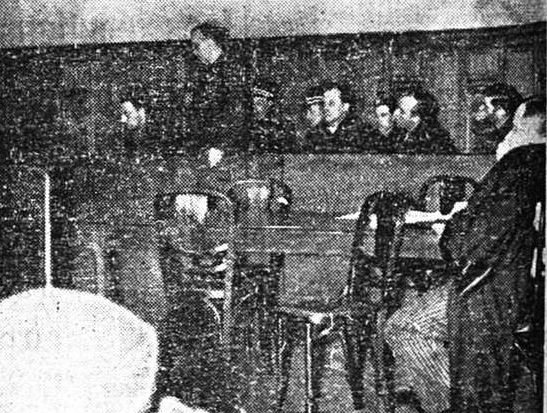
LEFT: Jules Hiernaux (1881-1944), a former Belgian government minister and Freemason, was assassinated by the Rexists under Louis Collard's orders in August 1944. RIGHT: Louis Collard rises from the dock to tesify in his own defense during the 1946 trial for Hiernaux's murder.

In testimony before the Belgian War Council, Jean Avart, a Rexist Party member of Formation B accused of several assassinations, accused Collard of having tasked him with centralizing information on Belgian Freemasonry with the aim of targeting prominent figures for reprisals, leading to the assassination of Jules Hiernaux, the director of the Université du Travail ("University of Labour") in Charleroi, a former minister of public education, and a Freemason who served as Grand Master of the Grand Orient of Belgium from 1937 to 1939. Faced with this accusation, Collard stated curtly that he merely had conducted research "for documentary purposes," but later admitted to having "taken responsibility for certain reprisals, those of 18 August, for example." He took refuge behind his role as the unofficial head of the political department of the Rexist Party, which was still officially under the direction of Brunet, although he acknowledged that he had exercised power without using his official title. Convicted of being among those responsible for the assassination of Hiernaux, Collard was sentenced to death on 1 March 1946.

==== Courcelles massacre ====
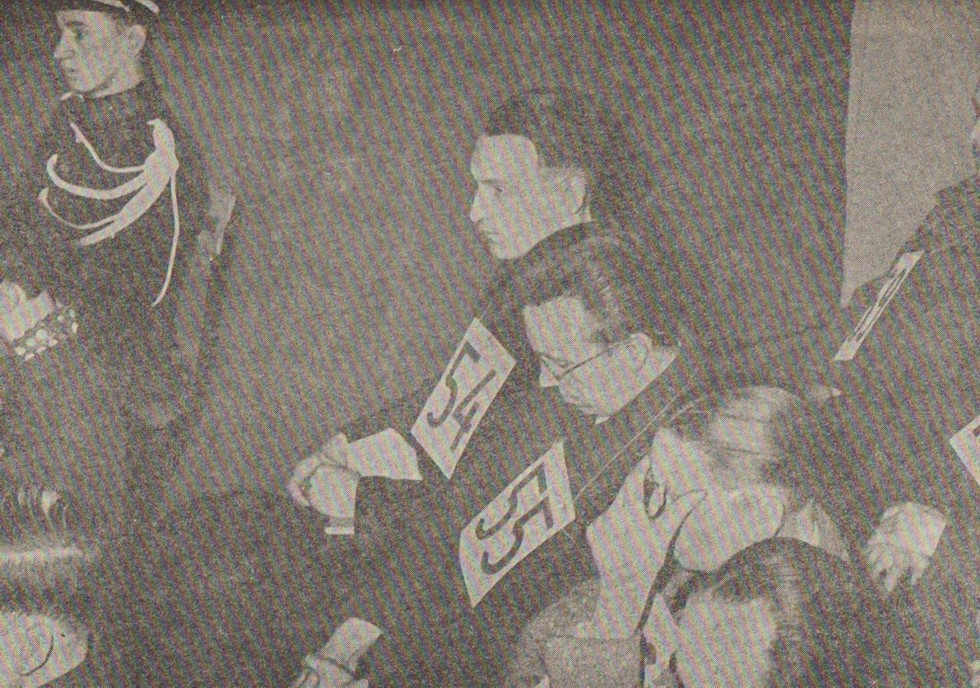
Victor Matthys (wearing defendant number 54), interim head of the Rexist Party from 1941 to 1944, and Louis Collard (wearing number 55) listen to the testimony of one of their subordinates during their 1946 trial for the Courcelles massacre.

On 21 May 1946, the largest trial in Belgian history at the time began in the Concordia Room in Charleroi before the Belgian War Council, involving 97 defendants suspected of having participated in the Courcelles massacre. Collard and Matthys were leading figures. Wearing number 55, a long jacket, and steel-rimmed glasses, Collard adopted an evasive attitude toward the questions of the presiding judge, feigning amnesia and using flimsy arguments to evade responsibility. When asked to recount what happened on 17 August 1944 in Courcelles, he replied, running his hand over his forehead, "It is absolutely impossible for me to remember anything." As for his alleged state of drunkenness before the massacres, he laughingly declared, "I don't remember anymore, I only have chaotic fragments of memory." Faced with the confessions of some Rexist Party members who saw him transporting gasoline and spraying the curtains of several houses, he ironically replied, "I don't remember anymore. But I remember that there were at least 15 people with me and I did everything. And the others, what were they for?"

Collard's lawyer, in defending him, argued that it was unfair to place Collard and Matthys on an equal footing in terms of their responsibility for the crimes. He asserted that Collard was never consulted by Matthys who, as the acting head of the Rexist Party at the time, made his decisions alone. Collard, according to his lawyer, should have been considered a clerk or mere secretary, and asked that Collard not receive the death penalty.

After a trial that lasted nearly two months, during which 147 prosecution witnesses testified and the defendants underwent questioning, the verdict was delivered at 10:00 on 3 August 1946. Collard and Matthys were found to be the main instigators of the killings and Collard was found guilty of having set fire to the castle of Thérèse Van Hoegarden and the architect Simon. Collard unsuccessfully attempted suicide in the months following the trial.

=== Execution ===
On 10 November 1947, Collard was executed by firing squad at a military barracks in Charleroi along with Matthys and 25 other members of the Rexist movement condemned for their crimes. He was among the first people shot that day, his execution scheduled for 7:30 a.m. After smoking his last cigarette, he was visibly overwhelmed and devastated by what awaited him and the police had to carry him to his execution post. Because of his status as a former Belgian Army soldier, he first underwent a formal demotion in rank, then was shot in the back at 7:36 a.m. Despite a small piece of red cloth marking his heart as the aiming point for the firing squad, he did not immediately succumb, and he collapsed and began to scream after the initial volley. He received final absolution from a Catholic priest, then was killed with a coup de grâce administered by a gendarmerie officer.
