= Bastin =

Bastin is a French-language surname, more common in Belgium than in France. Notable people with the surname include:

- Bruce Bastin (born 1939), English folklorist
- Cliff Bastin (1912–1991), English footballer
- Désiré Bastin (1900–1971), Belgian footballer
- George Bastin (1893–1947), Australian rules footballer
- Jules Bastin (1933–1996), Belgian opera singer
- Jules Bastin (soldier) (1889–1944), Belgian military officer
- Jules Bastin (sport shooter) (1879–?), Belgian sport shooter
- Julia Bastin (1888–1968), Belgian academic, educator and writer
- Marjolein Bastin (born 1943), Dutch artist, writer and illustrator
- Ted Bastin (1926–2011), English physicist and mathematician
