= Paul Hoornaert =

Belgian political activist

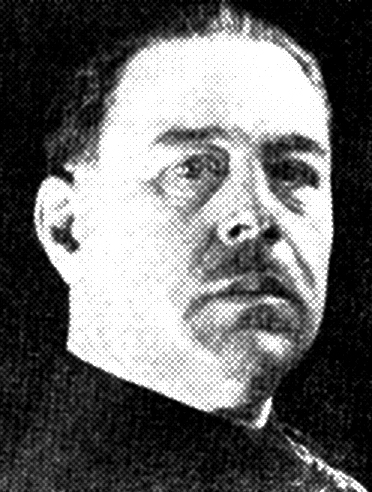
- Born: 5 November 1888; Liège, Belgium
- Died: 2 February 1944 (aged 55); Sonnenburg concentration camp, Free State of Prussia, Nazi Germany
- Education: Doctorate in law
- Alma mater: University of Liège
- Occupations: activist, lawyer
- Movement: Belgian Legion

Paul Hoornaert (5 November 1888 – 2 February 1944) was a Belgian far right political activist. Although a pioneer of fascism in the country he was an opponent of German Nazism and, after joining the Belgian Resistance during the German occupation, died in Nazi custody.

== Early years ==
Hoornaert was born in Liège to a middle class Catholic family and studied at the University of Liège, completing his doctorate in law in 1910. A lawyer by profession, Hoornaert was a veteran of the First World War where his combat record was highly distinguished.

== National Legion ==
A strong admirer of Benito Mussolini, but equally demonstrating a staunch hatred of Germany, Hoornaert was a member of the far right veterans' group National Legion (French: Légion Nationale, Dutch: Nationaal Legioen) which was established in Liège in 1922. Initially a minor group it grew rapidly from 1927 when Hoornaert became leader and converted it into a paramilitary militia. Under Hoornaert's leadership the 4,000-strong group, who wore a blue-shirted uniform in common with other European fascist groups, became associated with a militant Belgian nationalism, rejecting emphasis on both Flemish and Walloon identities in favour of a united Belgium. Other important ideological aspects included anti-communism, opposition to liberalism, and the parliamentary system. As Legion leader Hoornaert participated in the 1934 Montreux Fascist conference, campaigned in support of the Italian invasion of Ethiopia (1935–37) and raised volunteers for the Nationalists in the Spanish Civil War (1936–39).

The militia, which staunchly opposed Rexism despite sharing some aims, was strongly opposed to political party activity and for this reason Hoornaert broke from his sometime supporter, the writer Pierre Nothomb when he returned to the Catholic Party. His opponent Léon Degrelle suggested that Hoornaert never had more than 300 followers although more recent estimates have suggested that the Legion commanded as many as 7000 members by the early 1930s. He has been compared to Georges Valois in leading a pioneer fascist movement that rejected Nazism and instead took its impetus from the likes of Charles Maurras whilst drawing on disaffected ex-servicemen for its membership.

As well as leading the Legion Hoornaert was also briefly involved with the National Corporate Workers' Union (Nationaal Corporatief Arbeidsverbond, or NACO), a group set up by industrialist Charles Somville in June 1933. Hoornaert was a founder member of this group, although he and Somville clashed and became bitter rivals, partly because Somville feared that Hoornaert wanted to swallow up NACO in the Legion and partly because he was not enthusiastic about Somville's pet project, anti-Semitism. In 1940 he co-operated with Joris Van Severen, with an attempt made to merge the Legion with Van Severen's Verdinaso based on a shared loyalty to Leopold III of Belgium although the attempt was not a success.

== Later years ==
Following the German invasion Hoornaert was forced underground after the Nazis outlawed his militia. As a consequence he joined the Légion Belge, a far right resistance movement led by dissident Rexists who opposed the occupation of Belgium. For his activity in this group Hoornaert was arrested by the Germans in 1942 and died in the prison of Sonnenburg on 2 February 1944. His spell in the resistance saw Hoornaert awarded the Croix de guerre by France.
