= José Streel =

Journalist, Rexist (1911–1946)

- Born: Lucien Alphonse Joseph Streel; 14 December 1911; Seraing, Belgium
- Died: 21 February 1946 (aged 34); Saint-Gilles, Belgium
- Education: Doctorate in Romance philology
- Alma mater: University of Liège
- Occupations: Teacher, journalist
- Years active: 1930–1944
- Notable work: Les Jeunes Gens et la Politique; Ce Qu'Il Faut Penser de Rex; La révolution du XXème siècle
- Political party: Rexist Party
- Movement: Action Catholique de la Jeunesse Belge
- Status: Executed by firing squad
- Conviction: Treason
- Penalty: Death

Lucien Alphonse Joseph "José" Streel (14 December 1911 – 21 February 1946) was a Belgian journalist and supporter of Rexism. Streel was an important figure in the early years of the movement, when he was the main political philosopher of Rexism as an ideology. He subsequently became less of a central figure following the German occupation of Belgium during World War II due to his lukewarm attitude towards working with Nazi Germany. Nevertheless, he was executed by Belgium after the war as a collaborator.

== Background and early political activities ==
From a Catholic background, Streel took a doctorate in Romance philology at the University of Liège, where he also acted as president of the university's Fellowship of Christian Students. While working as a teacher and academic, Streel joined l'Action Catholique de la Jeunesse Belge in 1930 and whilst in this organisation he became close to Léon Degrelle and Jean Denis. As such he was an early member of the Rexist movement and rose to prominence with his 1932 work, Les Jeunes Gens et la Politique, which underlined his distaste for the modern world. Strongly influenced by Charles Maurras, the book sought to appeal to what it called the "young Catholic elite".

Throughout his writing Streel argued in favour of fascism, which he described as "something spiritual and mystical".

In keeping with other fascist theorists he was highly critical of rationalism and instead argued that "you must act. The rest will take care of itself". He was fiercely critical of individualism as opposed to group identity, arguing "the individual does not exist in the pure state".

== Rexism ==
Streel was appointed editor-in-chief of all the Rexist publications in 1936. That same year he published Ce Qu'Il Faut Penser de Rex, which was important as the philosophical basis of Rexism. He argued against democracy and in favour of an organic society, rejecting government by political parties and underlining what he perceived as the importance of group membership on the basis of family, regional, cultural and nationalistic identities. His work dealt little in the practicalities of how the ideology would be implemented, with these more mundane aspects covered more in the works of Denis.

He had reservations about Nazism due to his strong Catholic faith, and was generally not pro-German in outlook. A reserve officer in the Belgian Army, he was briefly held in a prisoner-of-war camp following the German invasion.

== Under the Nazis ==
Despite his reservations, Streel was ultimately reconciled to collaborationism, fearing that the alternative would be German annihilation of Belgium. He became editor of Le Pays Réel in August 1940 when it re-appeared, and with Degrelle enlisting in the German forces, he became an important advisor to the new Rexist leader Victor Matthys. A strong advocate of Belgian independence, he called for joint action between the Rexists and the Flemish National Union in an attempt to frustrate German plans to incorporate Belgium into the Greater Germanic Reich; but when Degrelle returned from action and rejected this policy, he resigned from Rex in January 1943. The two also clashed over Streel's desire to refocus Rex as a strong political party, something that did not interest Degrelle, who preferred them to be a militarily-minded movement, a further cause of the 1943 split.

Having left Rexism, he continued his personal policy of limited collaboration, contributing to journals and radio broadcasts. Condemned by Degrelle as "a little man with too many scruples", he privately felt that co-operating with the Germans was no longer worthwhile, although he would never publicly state these ideas.

== Exile and death ==
He eventually fled to Germany in 1944, although he took no political role there and instead worked in a factory. Belgian authorities condemned him to death in absentia but nonetheless he voluntarily re-entered the country after the war and gave himself up. Brought before the Brussels War Tribunal, he was defended by Paul-Henri Spaak and other leading figures and initially his sentence was commuted to life imprisonment with hard labour. A review by the Auditeur Militaire however uncovered an article he had written condemning the Belgian government in exile and reimposed the original sentence.

Streel declared "I regret nothing" and insisted that fascism had been essential for Europe in order to avert disaster. Held at the Ixelles army barracks, he was executed by firing squad on 21 February 1946.

== Books of José Streel ==
- Streel José, La révolution du XXème siècle (new edition of the book which was published in 1942 by the la NSE in Bruxelles), preface of Lionel Baland, Déterna, Paris, 2010.
