= List of protected heritage sites in Courcelles, Belgium =

This table shows an overview of the protected heritage sites in the Walloon town Courcelles, Belgium. This list is part of Belgium's national heritage.

Object	Year/architect	Town/section	Address	Coordinates	Number^{?}	Image
Organs of the church Saint-Lambert ^{(nl)} ^{(fr)}		Courcelles		50.461268°N 4.363794°E	52015-CLT-0001-01	
Ensemble of the farm of Grand Hamal and surrounding areas ^{(nl)} ^{(fr)}		Courcelles		50.479107°N 4.378923°E	52015-CLT-0002-01	
Farm Posterie and environment ^{(nl)} ^{(fr)}		Courcelles		50.462530°N 4.376661°E	52015-CLT-0003-01	
Farm of Grand Hamal: facade and roof ^{(nl)} ^{(fr)}		Courcelles		50.479375°N 4.380285°E	52015-CLT-0004-01	
St. Martin's Church ^{(nl)} ^{(fr)}		Courcelles		50.486557°N 4.328581°E	52015-CLT-0005-01	
Castle of Trazegnies ^{(nl)} ^{(fr)}		Courcelles	avenue de la Marlière	50.461623°N 4.329934°E	52015-CLT-0006-01	Kasteel van Trazegnies
Castle of Trazegnies: park ^{(nl)} ^{(fr)}		Courcelles	avenue de la Marlière	50.461827°N 4.328537°E	52015-CLT-0007-01	Kasteel van Trazegnies: park
Castle of Trazegnies: extension of the classification of the remains of the car port overlooking the right of way known as "Avenue Paul Pastur" ^{(nl)} ^{(fr)}		Courcelles		50.460517°N 4.329323°E	52015-CLT-0008-01	
Church of Saint Martin and the rectory and the ensemble of the church, the old cemetery that surrounds it, the rectory with outbuildings and garden ^{(nl)} ^{(fr)}		Courcelles	rue Léandre Vilain, n° 17	50.469661°N 4.329549°E	52015-CLT-0009-01	Kerk Saint Martin en de pastorie en het ensemble van de kerk, de oude begraafplaats die het omringt, de pastorie met de bijgebouwen en de tuin
Bird Claire-Fontaine ^{(nl)} ^{(fr)}		Courcelles		50.482162°N 4.298465°E	52015-CLT-0010-01	
Chapel of the Holy Family ^{(nl)} ^{(fr)}		Courcelles	rue du Bosquet, avant le n° 52	50.478685°N 4.328720°E	52015-CLT-0011-01	
Architectural ensemble: some parts of the "Groupe Civique" ^{(nl)} ^{(fr)}		Courcelles		50.466369°N 4.331267°E	52015-CLT-0016-01	Ensemble architecturaal: bepaalde delen van de "Groupe Civique"
Rectory of the parish of Saint-Martin (facades and roofs) ^{(nl)} ^{(fr)}		Courcelles	place communale 1	50.486669°N 4.329129°E	52015-CLT-0018-01	

== See also ==
- List of protected heritage sites in Hainaut (province)
- Courcelles, Belgium
