= Courcelles massacre =

Episode of mass murder in Belgium

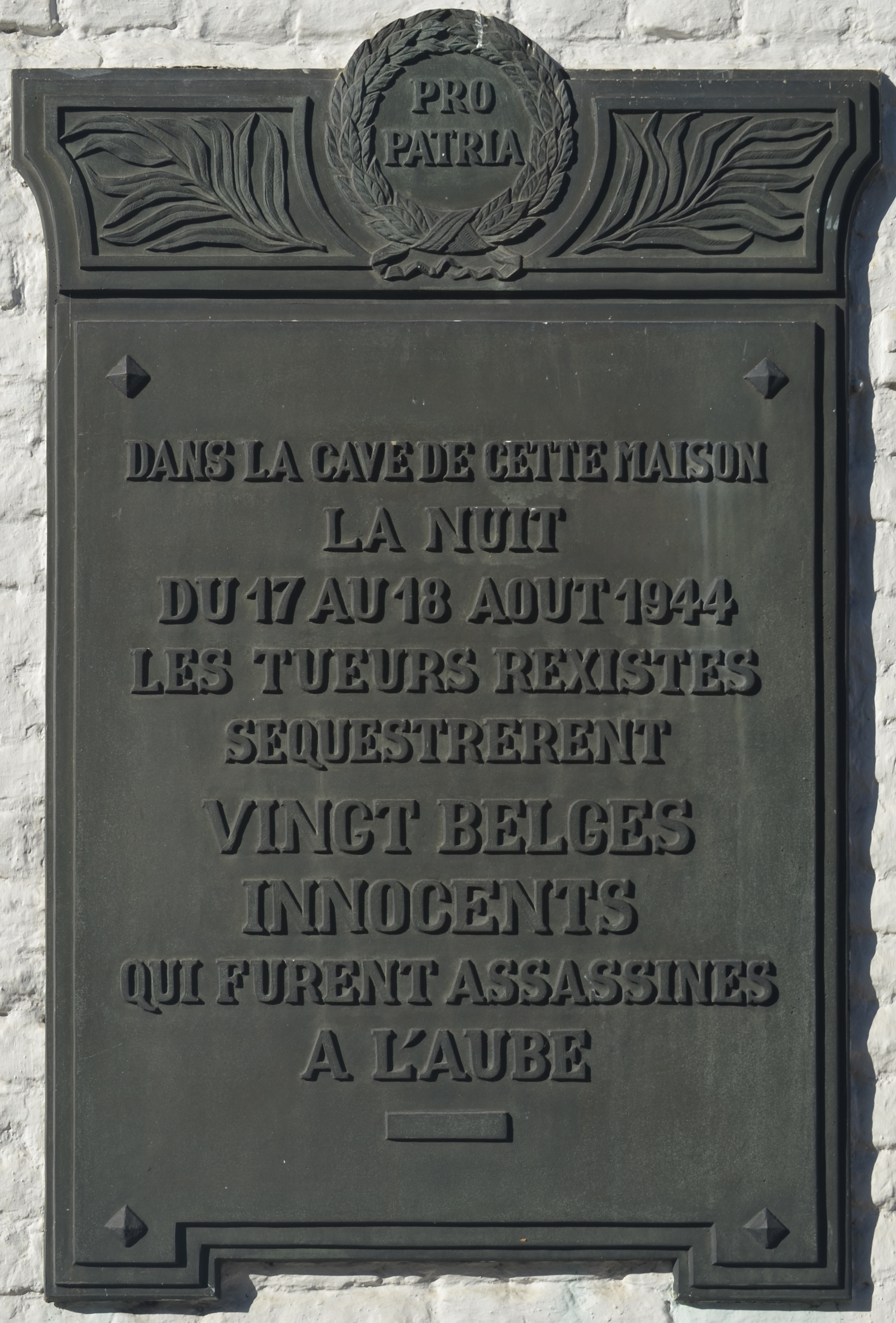
- Monument at the site of the main killings on 18 August 1944
- Location: Courcelles, Charleroi, Belgium
- Date: 17 and 18 August 1944
- Attack type: Mass murder in retaliation against the Belgian Resistance
- Deaths: 27 civilians (total)
- Perpetrator: Rexist paramilitaries
- Motive: Reprisal for the murder of a Rexist official and his family by Resistance members.

The Courcelles massacre (French: Tuerie de Courcelles), sometimes known as the Rognac massacre (Tuerie du Rognac), involved the killing of 27 civilians in a number of separate instances by a collaborationist militia associated with the Rexist Party in German-occupied Belgium during World War II. The killings occurred on 17–18 August 1944, shortly before the Allied liberation of Belgium, near Courcelles, a suburb of the industrial city of Charleroi in Hainaut Province, in revenge for the killing of a Rexist official by the Belgian Resistance.

== Background ==
=== Rex and German-occupied Belgium ===
At the time of the German invasion in May 1940, Belgium had several political parties that were broadly sympathetic to the authoritarian and anti-democratic ideals represented by Nazi Germany. In Wallonia and Brussels, the largest of these groups was the Rexist Party, led by Léon Degrelle. This had originated as a faction of the mainstream Catholic Block, but split in 1935 to form an independent populist party. Ideologically, Rex supported Belgian nationalism, but its support for corporatism and anti-communism made it sympathetic towards aspects of Nazi ideology. It achieved some early success, peaking at the elections of 1936 in which it received 11.5 percent of the national vote, but experienced a decline in the following years before the German invasion and remained marginal.

After the Belgian surrender on 28 May 1940, a German Military Administration was created to govern the occupied territory. Preferring a strategy of indirect rule, the administration preferred to work with established Belgian political and social elites, largely ignoring fringe political groups such as the Rexists. In order to acquire more influence and German support, Rex attempted to bring itself closer to the occupation authorities. On 1 January 1941, Degrelle announced Rex's total support for the occupation authorities and for the policy of collaborationism and its political influence in German circles rose after the German invasion of the Soviet Union on 22 June 1941.

=== Rex and the Belgian Resistance ===
Over following years, especially after 1943, Rex consolidated its control over local government in German-occupied Wallonia and an increasing number of party members were installed as burgomasters with German support. This was particularly true in the industrial region around Charleroi and La Louvière known as the Pays Noir, historically a centre for socialist and communist activism, where Rex even formed its own paramilitary units. However, the deterioration of the German military position on the Eastern Front emboldened the Belgian Resistance which were also active among communist and socialist workers in the same region. Assassinations of Rexist officials became common, especially in Charleroi where two Rexist burgomasters would be assassinated during the conflict. These attacks sparked retaliation by Rexist militias against civilians and suspected resistance sympathisers, often with tacit approval of the German authorities, and these escalated after the Normandy Landings in June 1944. It has been argued that by the end of the German occupation, "Rex was essentially caught up in a process of local civil war."

== Massacre ==
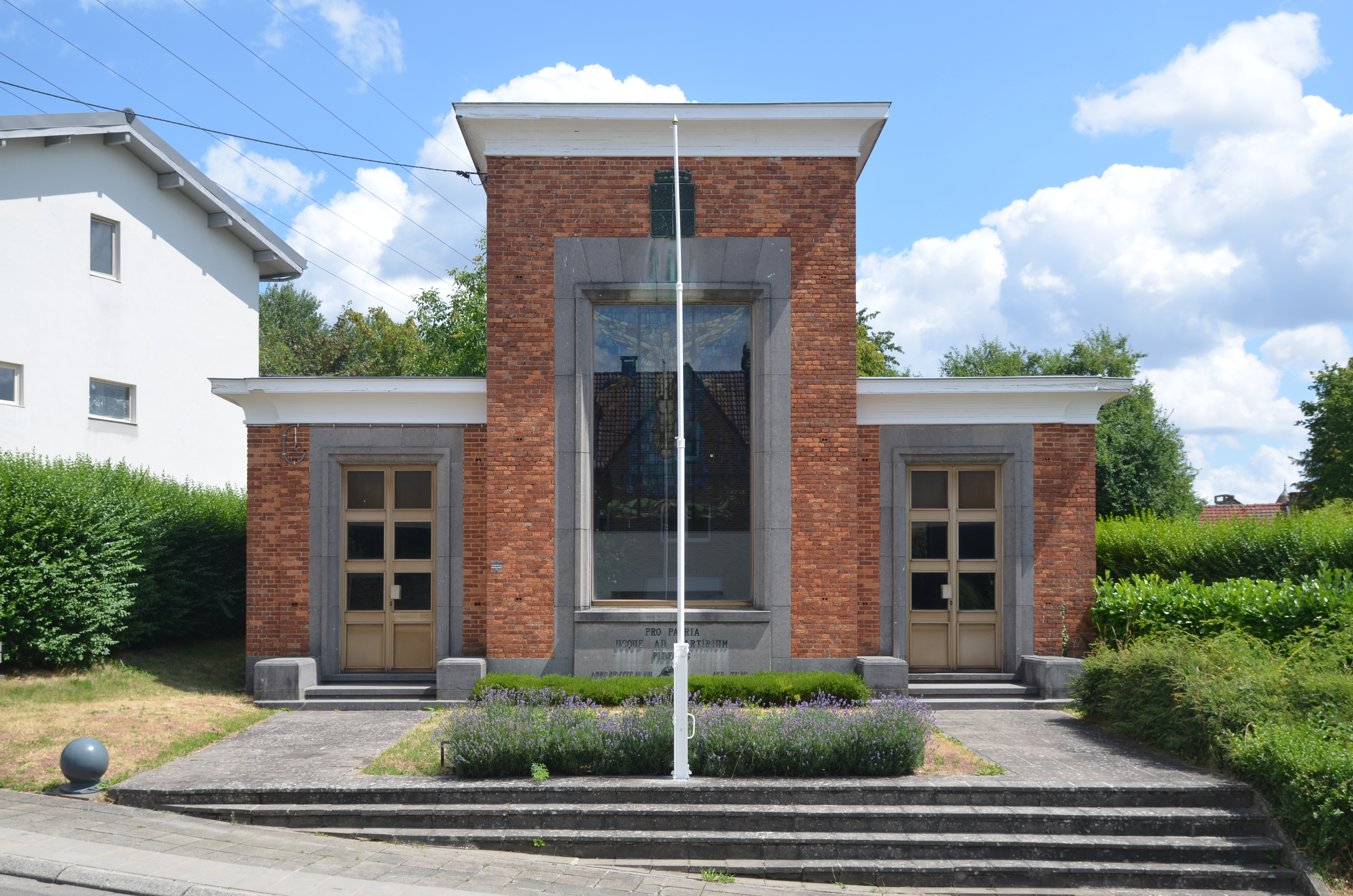
Memorial built on the scene of the killing.

Prosper Teughels, Rex's first burgomaster of Greater Charleroi, was assassinated on 19 November 1942. He was succeeded by Oswald Englebin who was also a Rexist. On 17 August 1944, Englebin was shot dead, together with his wife and son, Philippe, as they returned to their house in the Charleroi suburb of Trazegnies. As his vehicle passed through the Bois du Rognac neighborhood between Monceau-sur-Sambre and Courcelles, resistance members opened fire on the vehicle killing all its occupants except a gendarme assigned as a guard. The identities of the resistance members involved have never been established. The attack happened as the Allied forces which had landed in Normandy in June, were already advancing rapidly towards Belgium and German forces were in full retreat.

News of the attack reached Rexist officials, both in Charleroi and Brussels, shortly afterwards and sparked violent reprisals. A 150-strong Rexist militia unit arrived in Courcelles. Two civilians were murdered in the street and several houses set alight. In the night of 17–18 August, there were numerous arrests and killings in the Courcelles region, where three more civilians were killed.

The main killing occurred at dawn on 18 August when 21 civilians rounded up in Courcelles the previous day were taken to the cellar of a requisitioned house, part of a row of inconspicuous corons at the present-day rue des Martyrs near to the site of Englebin's assassination; 19 of them were killed. The victims were local notables including lawyers, engineers, doctors, and senior police officers. The killings were supervised by leading party members, including its leader Victor Matthys and his eventual successor Louis Collard, as well as the regional leader Joseph Pévenasse.

Entirely separately, the German occupation authorities in Belgium retaliated for Englebin's assassination by executing 20 hostages already held for other resistance activities.

== Aftermath ==
Belgium was liberated by Allied forces in September 1944 and the pursuit of Nazi collaborators (épuration) began. It was estimated that the Courcelles massacre involved 150 perpetrators of whom 97 were identified. 80 were arrested in the following months and tried. 27 of these were sentenced to death and executed at Charleroi on 10 November 1947.

The road with the house in which the majority of the killings took place was renamed the rue des Martyrs (lit. 'Martyrs' Street') and is commemorated by a plaque. An annual commemoration of the massacre has been held on 18 August in subsequent years in memory of the victims of the massacre. A small chapel was also erected. The Courcelles massacre remains the most famous example of collaborationist reprisals against the civilian population in Belgium.

The Belgian journalist Maurice De Wilde devoted the final episode of his 1988 documentary series De Tijd der Vergelding (The Time of Retaliation) to the Courcelles massacre.
