= Streel =

Streel may refer to the following people

- José Streel, a Belgian journalist and supporter of Rexism
- Marc Streel, a Belgian racing cyclist

Also, Streel may refer to
