= Pire =

Pire may refer to:

- 3228 Pire, a minor planet
- Pire, Žepče, a village in Bosnia-Herzegovina
- Pire Goureye, a town in Senegal

== People ==
- Christian Pire (1930–2000), French Olympic diver
- Dominique Pire (1910–1969), Belgian Dominican friar, recipient of the 1958 Nobel Peace Prize
- Hippolyte Piré (1778–1850), French general
- Jules Pire (1878–1953), Belgian soldier and resistance leader of World War II
- Louis Alexandre Henri Joseph Piré (1827–1887), Belgian botanist
