= Bervoets =

Bervoets is a Belgian surname. Notable people with the surname include:

- Christiane Bervoets (1948–2023), Belgian singer
- Gene Bervoets (born 1956), Belgian actor
- Marguerite Bervoets (1914–1944), Belgian resistance fighter
- Marnicq Bervoets (born 1969), Belgian motocross racer
