= Jules Pire =

WWII Belgian resistance fighter

Lieutenant-General Jules Pire
- Born: 29 March 1878; Hannut, Liège Province, Belgium
- Died: 29 January 1953 (aged 74); Brussels, Belgium
- Military career
- Allegiance: Belgium
- Branch: Belgian Army; Belgian Resistance
- Service years: 1897-1944
- Rank: Lieutenant general
- Commands: 10th Division of Chasseurs Ardennais; Secret Army
- Conflicts: World War I; German invasion of Belgium; Yser Front; World War II; Battle of Belgium

Jules Joseph Pire (1878-1953) was a Belgian career soldier and a leading figure in the Belgian Resistance during World War II. In this capacity, he led the Secret Army, the largest faction of the resistance, from January 1944.

== Career ==
Pire was born in Hannut, Liège Province, Belgium on 29 March 1878. He enlisted in the Belgian Army in 1897, initially as a non-commissioned officer and subsequently as an officer. He was admitted to the Ecole de Guerre and served in the staff of the 3rd Brigade during the German invasion of Belgium in World War I. Transferring to the infantry, Pire rose rapidly through the ranks during the war and in its aftermath. The culmination of his career was as commander of the newly created Corps of Chasseurs Ardennais from 1936 to 1939. He retired in April 1939 as a lieutenant general, before being recalled in September when the outbreak of World War II led to the mobilisation of the Belgian Army, despite its neutral status. During the 18 Days' Campaign, Pire commanded the 10th Division of Chasseurs Ardennais.

With Belgium under German Occupation, Pire became involved in the resistance. In 1941, he was involved in the creation of the Belgian Legion, a group in the Belgian Resistance with right-wing political sympathies. He became the group's commander in Wallonia. The Belgian Legion subsequently merged with other groups, eventually becoming the Secret Army in 1944.

Following the arrest of Jules Bastin and his successor's escape to the United Kingdom, Pire became head of the Secret Army in January 1944. In this role, he led the group's mobilisation after the Normandy Landings and during the Liberation of Belgium from June to September 1944. He subsequently supervised the group's demobilisation before retiring. He died on 29 January 1953.

== Bibliography ==
- Bernard, Henri (1972). "Jules Pire". Biographie nationale. Vol. 37. Brussels: Académie royale de Belgique. pp. 655–8.
