= Montigny-le-Tilleul =

Municipality in Hainaut Province, Wallonia, Belgium

Montigny-le-Tilleul Montniye-Tiyoû (Walloon)
- Municipality
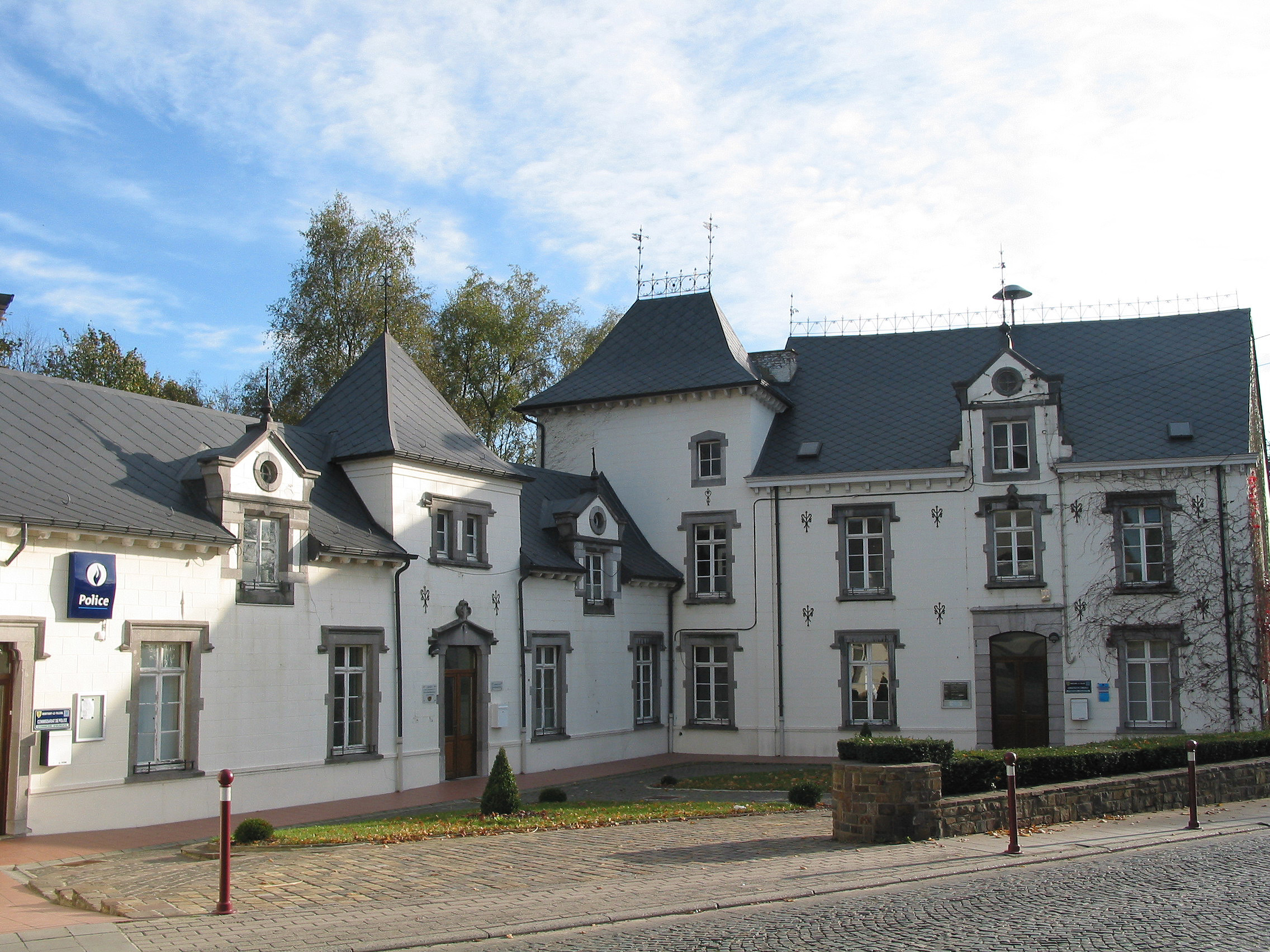

- Flag Coat of arms

- Location of Montigny-le-Tilleul in Hainaut
- Interactive map of Montigny-le-Tilleul
- Location in Belgium
- Coordinates: 50°23′N 04°23′E
- Country: Belgium
- Community: French Community
- Region: Wallonia
- Province: Hainaut
- Arrondissement: Charleroi

Government
  - Mayor: Marie Hélène Knoops (MR)
  - Governing party: MR

Area
  - Total: 15.23 km^{2} (5.88 sq mi)

Population (2018-01-01)
  - Total: 10,136
  - Density: 665.5/km^{2} (1,724/sq mi)
- Postal codes: 6110, 6111
- NIS code: 52048
- Area codes: 071
- Website: www.montigny-le-tilleul.be

Montigny-le-Tilleul (French pronunciation: [mɔ̃tiɲi lə tijœl]; Walloon: Montniye-Tiyoû) is a municipality of Wallonia located in the province of Hainaut, Belgium.

On January 1, 2006, Montigny-le-Tilleul had a total population of 10,205. The total area is 15.10 km^{2} which gives a population density of 676 inhabitants per km^{2}.

The municipality consists of the sections of Landelies and Montigny-le-Tilleul.

== Notable inhabitants ==
- Jules Hiernaux, politician (1881-1944)

== Sights ==
- Village of Landelies, at the Haute-Sambre: picturesque port, lock and weir. Nice place for walking and biking. Railway station.
