= Secret Army (Belgium) =

Belgian resistance group during World War II

Secret Army Armée Secrète (French) Geheim Leger (Dutch)
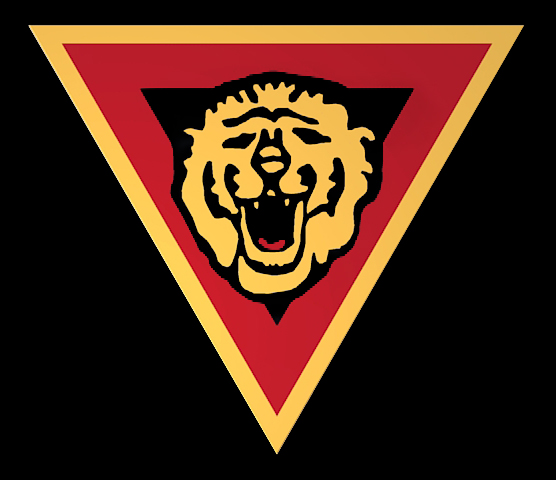
- Other name: Belgian Legion (1940–43); Army of Belgium (1943–44); Secret Army (1944)
- Leaders: Charles Claser; Jules Bastin; Jules Pire
- Dates active: August 1940–October 1944
- Active regions: German-occupied Belgium
- Ideology: Right-wing; Catholic; Leopoldist
- Size: 54,000+ members (1944)
- Wars: the Belgian Resistance (World War II)

The Secret Army (French: Armée Secrète, pronounced [aʁme səkʁɛt], AS; Dutch: Geheim Leger, pronounced [ɣəˈɦɛi̯m ˈleːɣər], GL) was an organisation within the Belgian Resistance, active during the German occupation of Belgium during World War II. With more than 54,000 members, it was by far the largest resistance group active in the country.

Founded in August 1940 as the Belgian Legion, the Secret Army changed its name on a number of occasions during its existence, adopting its final appellation in June 1944. The Secret Army incorporated many former officers from the defeated Belgian Army and, politically, was dominated by right-wing conservatives and royalists. Although sometimes strained, the Secret Army enjoyed the closest relations of any large resistance movement with the Belgian government-in-exile.

== Foundation ==
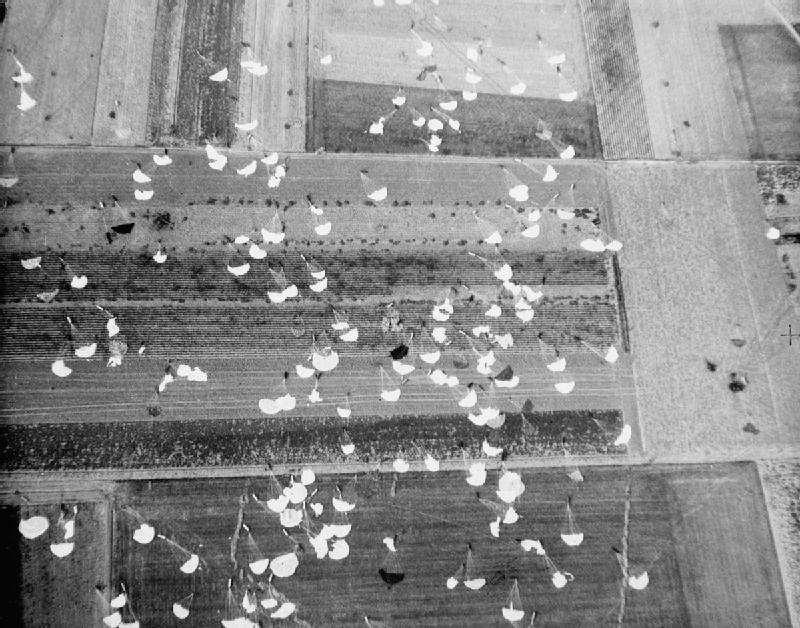
British parachute drops of weapons and supplies to the resistance in the countryside near Brussels

The origin of the Secret Army can be traced back to shortly after the Belgian surrender after the German invasion of 10–28 May 1940. A number of career officers from the defeated Belgian Army joined together to create the first small resistance organisations, such as the "Belgian Legion" (Légion Belge or Belgisch Legioen) and "Reconstructed Belgian Army" (Armée Belge Reconstituée or Heropgericht Belgisch Leger). The members involved were generally right-wing in their political views and hostile to pre-war democratic politics. They strongly identified with King Leopold III, expressing hostility towards Belgian politicians and communists as well as the German occupiers. In the spring of 1941, the Reconstructed Belgian Army and Belgian Legion merged, keeping the Belgian Legion name, under the leadership of Charles Claser, Robert Lentz and Jules Bastin. The organisation had units across the country, with as many as 50,000 members, and its own local organisation.

== Activities ==
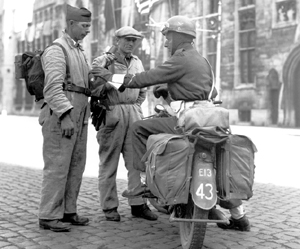
Uniformed members of the Secret Army with a Canadian soldier in Bruges in September 1944

The group's leaders attempted to forge contacts with the Belgian government in London and with the British Special Operations Executive (SOE) and MI9. In 1942, Claser travelled to London in person to bring the organisation into contact with both the Belgian and British authorities. The Belgian government, however, distrusted the intentions of the Belgian Legion. Although expanding rapidly, the Belgian Legion was beset by internal political disputes. Arrests of leading resistance members also destabilised the movement. By the end of the occupation, Claser, Lentz, and Bastin had all been arrested.

In 1943, the Belgian Legion changed its name to "Army of Belgium" (Armée de Belgique or Leger van België) and subsequently to the Secret Army (Armée Secrete or Geheim Leger) in June 1944. Between 1943 and 1944, the majority of the aid sent to the resistance in occupied Belgium was delivered to the group. In exchange, however, the group had to subscribe to the government's strategic plans to avoid confrontation with the Germans until shortly before the Liberation of Belgium when the group was tasked with providing tactical help to the Allied forces. Relations between the Belgian government and the Secret Army remained tense throughout the war, however, with neither party trusting the other. In February 1944, Jules Pire took over as its leader and began to restructure the group's leadership and make it more cohesive. As part of its attempt to resemble an official army, the group adopted its own uniform in April 1944, modelled on worker's overalls.

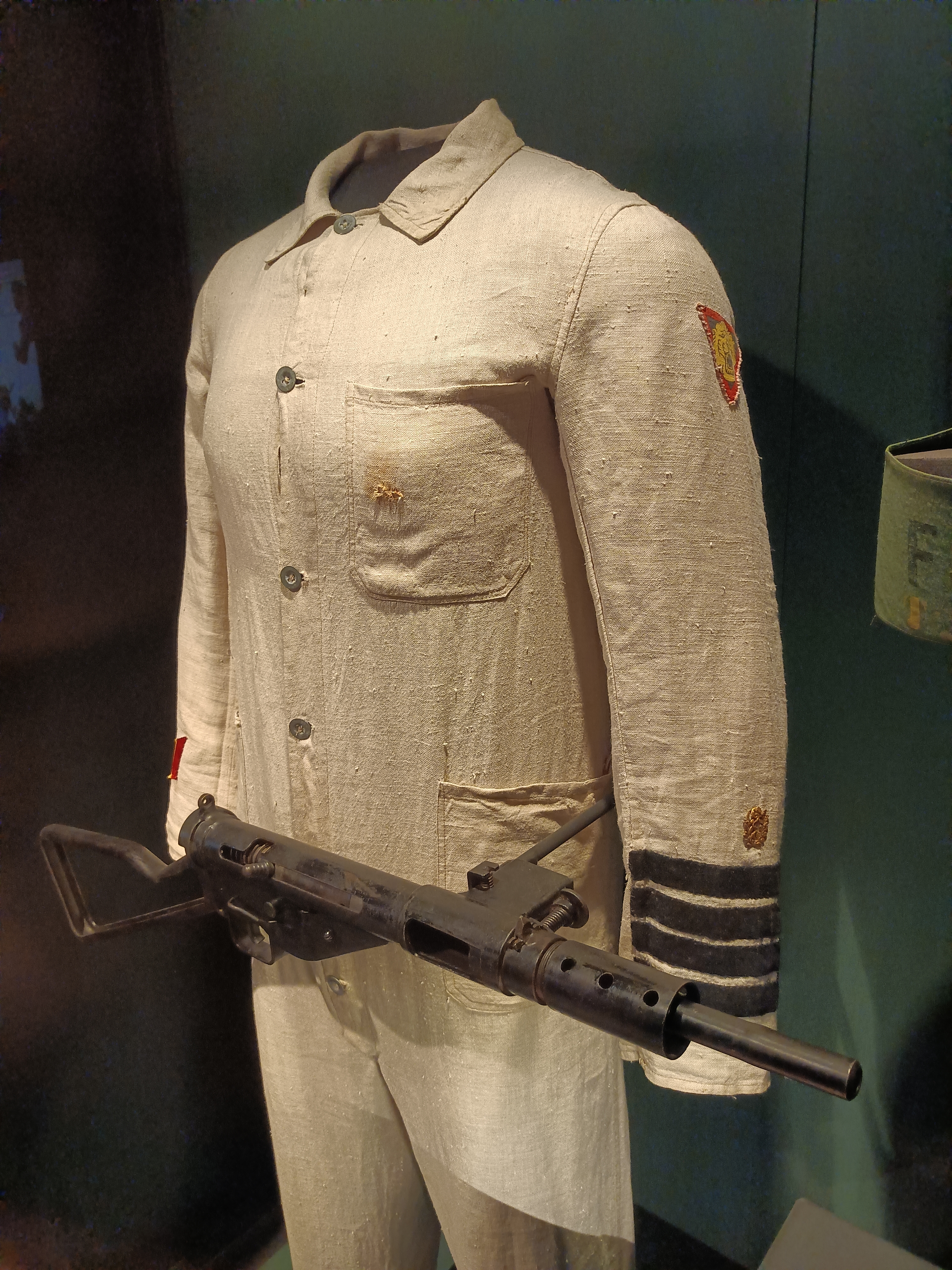
An example of the tam overalls and lion badge adopted as a uniform in April 1944 in preparation for the Liberation (Mons Memorial Museum).

Shortly after D-Day in June 1944, the Secret Army was ordered to begin sabotaging railway and communications networks. Together with other groups including the Front de l'Indépendance and the Witte Brigade, Secret Army personnel played an important role in the capture of the Port of Antwerp in September 1944 before the arrival of Canadian troops, preventing the Germans from destroying the installation as they prepared to retreat.

At its height in 1944, the Secret Army had as many as 54,000 members across Belgium. Around 4,000 members of the Secret Army were killed during the occupation. After the liberation, many members of the Secret Army were incorporated into the re-formed Belgian Army's new Fusilier Battalions. As many as 80 percent of the 53,700 soldiers in the battalions had previously been members of the Secret Army or the small National Royalist Movement.

== Notable members ==
- Jef Van Bilsen (1913–96), former Verdinaso member who joined in 1942
