= Rexist Party =

1935–1945 far-right Belgian political party

- Founder: Léon Degrelle
- Founded: 2 November 1935
- Dissolved: 30 March 1945
- Split from: Catholic Party
- Newspaper: Le Pays Réel
- Paramilitary wing: Formations de Combat
- Ideology: Rexism
- Political position: Far-right
- Religion: Roman Catholicism
- Colours: Red Black
- Anthem: Vers l'avenir (lit. 'Towards the future')

Party flag

The Rexist Party, or simply Rex, was a far-right Catholic authoritarian and corporatist political party active in Belgium from 1935 until 1945. The party was founded by a journalist, Léon Degrelle. It advocated Belgian unitarism and royalism. Initially, the party ran in both Flanders and Wallonia, but it never achieved much success outside Wallonia and Brussels. Its name was derived from the Roman Catholic journal and publishing company Christus Rex (Latin for 'Christ the King').

The highest electoral achievement of the Rexist Party was 21 out of 202 deputies (with 11.4% of the vote) and twelve senators in the 1936 election. Never a mass movement, it was on the decline by 1938. During the German occupation of Belgium in World War II, Rex was the most significant collaborationist group in French-speaking Belgium, paralleled by the Vlaams Nationaal Verbond (Flemish for 'Flemish National Union') (VNV) in Flanders. By the war's end, Rex was widely discredited and banned following the liberation.

Initially modeled on Italian Fascism and Spanish Falangism, it later drew closer to German Nazism. The Party espoused a "right-wing revolution" and the dominance of the Catholic Church in Belgium, but its ideology came to be vigorously opposed by the leader of the Belgian Church Cardinal van Roey, who called Rexism a "danger to the church and the country".

== Ideology ==
The ideology of the Rexist Party developed over time and is generally divided between an early phase rooted in Catholic authoritarianism and a later phase characterized by explicit fascism. Scholars commonly interpret Rexism as a movement that evolved from religiously inspired social reform into a radical authoritarian project shaped by broader European fascist currents.

=== Authoritarianism ===
The ideology of Rex, which was loosely based on the writings of Jean Denis, called for the “moral renewal” of Belgian society through the dominance of the Catholic Church by forming a corporatist society and abolishing liberal democracy. Denis became an enthusiastic member of Rex and later wrote for the party newspaper Le Pays Réel. The original programme of Rexism borrowed strongly from Charles Maurras’ integralism, reflecting a broader rejection of parliamentary liberalism and pluralism. The movement rejected liberalism, which it characterized as decadent, and opposed both Marxism and capitalism, instead advocating a corporatist economic model while idealising rural life, hierarchy, and traditional family values.

It emerged from the broader context of Catholic Action, seeking to translate religious activism into political transformation and to reshape Belgian society along moral and spiritual lines. Historians have debated whether Rex should be considered a fascist movement in this early period. Some scholars instead describe it as a populist, authoritarian, and conservative Catholic nationalist movement that initially sought to gain power through democratic means and did not aim to abolish democratic institutions outright.

=== Radicalization and fascist transformation ===
The party increasingly adopted fascist-style rhetoric during the late 1930s, particularly after Léon Degrelle’s defeat in a by-election in April 1937. Following this setback, Rexism shifted toward open antisemitism, anti-parliamentarianism, and a more explicit alignment with the ideological model of German Nazism. Historian Roger Griffin characterizes the movement as “proto-fascist” in its early phase, becoming fully fascist only during the period of German occupation. This interpretation reflects a broader scholarly consensus that Rexism underwent a process of ideological radicalization rather than emerging as a fully developed fascist movement from the outset. Contemporary accounts reflected elements of this transformation. In 1937, Time magazine described Rexism as opposing parliamentary government and advocating “discipline, order and social regeneration on a Christian basis,” while presenting itself as a movement against established political parties and financial elites.

=== Political positioning and alliances ===
The Rexist movement attracted support almost exclusively from Wallonia. On 6 October 1936, party leader Léon Degrelle made a secret agreement with the Vlaams Nationaal Verbond (VNV), led by Staf De Clercq, as both movements sought to establish corporatist systems. However, the alliance was short-lived. Unlike the Rexists, the VNV pursued Flemish separatism and union with the Netherlands, whereas Rex advocated Belgian unitarism. The agreement collapsed within a year. Rex also faced competition from the ideologically similar (but explicitly anti-German) Légion Nationale led by Paul Hoornaert.

=== Burgundian nationalism ===
On 17 January 1943, Degrelle gave a speech at an assembly of Rexists in Brussels in which he declared that Walloons were a Germanic people forced to adopt the French language. He proclaimed a new, revolutionary "Burgundian" nationalism within the framework of a pan-German state. Following the speech, Streel and much of Rex's old guard left the party, Walloon competitors to Rex for German favor evaporated, and Degrelle definitively turned his attentions away from Rex and towards the SS. Over the rest of January and February 1943, Degrelle met with Nazi functionaries in Brussels, Berlin, and Paris to gain influence in the Nazi Party.

== Pre-war politics ==
The Rexist Party was founded in 1935 after its leader, Léon Degrelle, had left the mainstream Catholic Party, which he deemed too moderate. It targeted disappointed constituencies such as traditionalist Catholics, veterans, small traders and jobless people. In the Depression era, it initially won considerable popularity — mostly due to its leader's charisma and energy. Its most tremendous success was winning 11.5 per cent of the total vote in the 1936 election. On that occasion the Rexist Party took 21 of the 202 seats in the Chamber of Deputies and 8 out of 101 in the Senate, making it the fourth-strongest force in Parliament, behind the significant established parties (Labour, Catholic, Liberal).

However, the support for the party (even at its height) was extremely localized: Rexists succeeded in garnering over 30 per cent of the vote in the French-speaking province of Luxembourg, compared with just 9 per cent in equally French-speaking Hainaut. Degrelle admired Adolf Hitler's rise to power and progressively imitated the tone and style of fascist campaigning, while the movement's ties to the Roman Catholic Church were increasingly repudiated by the Belgian clergy.

Degrelle ran in the April 1937 Brussels by-election against Prime Minister Paul van Zeeland of the Catholic Party, who was supported — in the hope of thwarting a Rexist victory — by all other parties, including even the Communists. The Archbishop of Mechelen and primate of the Catholic Church of Belgium, Jozef-Ernest Cardinal van Roey, intervened, rebuking Rexist voters, insisting that even abstention from voting would be sinful, and calling Rexism "a danger to the country and to the Church". Degrelle was decisively defeated: he obtained only 20 per cent of the vote, the rest going to Van Zeeland.

"[Degrelle] could always command a large and enthusiastic audience, for he was a handsome young man, with dreamy but searching eyes, and a voice that could be impressively thunderous or tender when he spoke (and he almost always did) about small children and his own aged mother. He presented himself as an undaunted crusader fighting for law and order, decency and selflessness, and his attacks on party leaders who had important interests in banks and industries made a deep impression and indeed were not always without justification. After his victory in the 1936 election, followed by defeat the next year, he became more overtly national socialist, introducing the theme of anti-Semitism and advocating dictatorship."

— E. H. Kossmann, historian

=== Early impact of Catholicism ===
The missionary spirit of Catholic Action attracted them because it allowed them to actively pursue societal reform and see tangible results from their efforts. However, they also understood that political involvement could only achieve meaningful, large-scale change. The story of the Rexist movement is, at its core, about the attempt to channel Catholic activism—focused on moral and religious renewal—into the political sphere in Belgium. It is also how fascism took root in the Belgian context. As Rex developed politically, it came under the influence of a rapidly spreading ideology across Europe—fascism—which appeared to offer solutions to others seeking societal transformation. Given Belgium's unique historical and geographic position and the political tensions in 1930s Europe, the form of fascism that emerged within Rex held particular significance.

=== Shift towards Nazism ===
Afterwards, Rexism allied itself with the interests of Nazi Germany even more strongly and incorporated Nazi-style antisemitism into its platform. At the same time, its popularity declined sharply. In the 1939 national election, Rex's share of votes fell to 4.4 per cent, and the party lost 17 of its 21 seats, largely to the mainstream Catholic and Liberal parties.

=== Factionalism ===
The fleeting support the movement received in 1936 came mainly from discontented, lower-middle-class French-speaking Catholics affected by the economic depression. Following 1940, a new wave of leaders and activists emerged—those who chose to align themselves with the Nazi occupiers. As the Légion grew into the most active faction within Rex, the final generation consisted primarily of alienated young people, many of whom were trying to conceal their pasts or avoid compulsory labour service in Germany, similar to the followers of Jacques Doriot studied by Paul Jankowski in Marseilles.

== Second World War ==
With the German invasion of Belgium in 1940, Rexism welcomed German occupation, even though it had initially supported the pre-war Belgian policy of neutrality. While some former Rexists went into the underground resistance or (like José Streel) withdrew from politics after they had come to see the Nazis' anticlerical and extreme anti-Semitic policies enforced in occupied Belgium, most Rexists, however, proudly supported the occupiers and assisted German forces with the repression of the territory wherever they could. Nevertheless, the popularity of Rex continued to drop. In 1941, at a reunion in Liège, Degrelle was booed by about a hundred demonstrators.

In August 1944, a Rexist militia was responsible for the Courcelles Massacre.

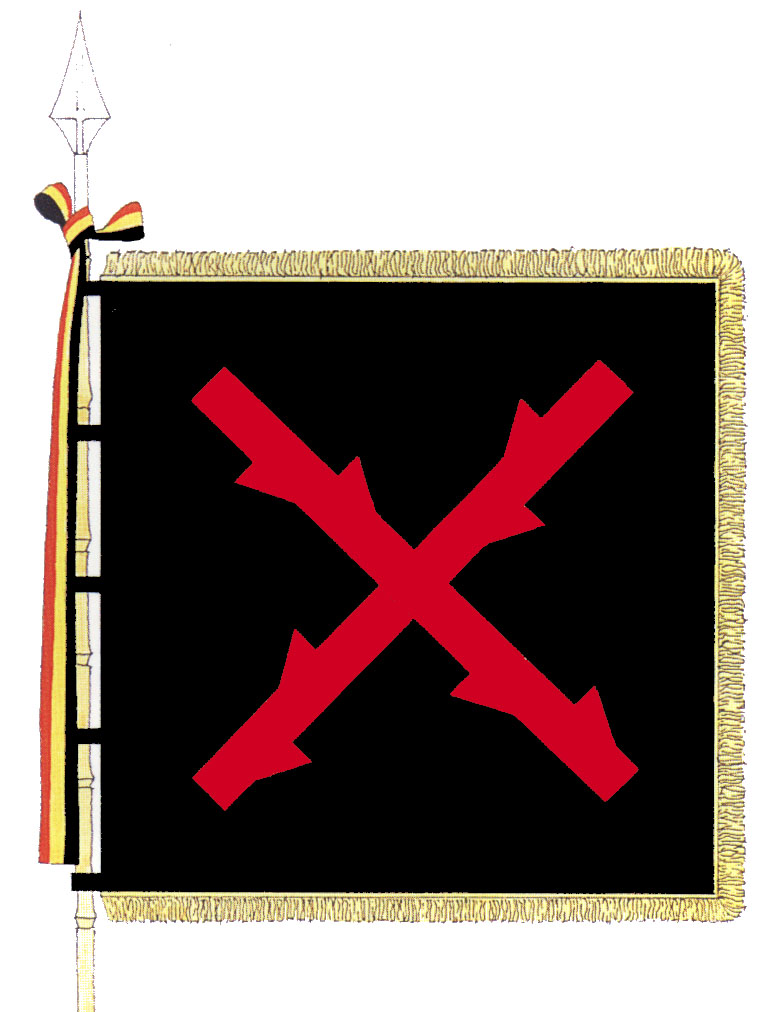
The Formations de Combat used the Cross of Burgundy.

=== Collaboration ===
Closely affiliated with Rex was the Walloon Legion, a unit within the German Army Wehrmacht and later the Waffen-SS raised from French-speaking volunteers in Belgium with Rexist support after German invasion of the Soviet Union. After an initial failure to attract recruits, Degrelle volunteered for the unit as a publicity stunt and spent much of the rest of the war outside Belgium on the Eastern Front. He increasingly saw the Walloon Legion as a better vehicle for seeking German support than the Rexist Party, and recruitment drained the party of its cadres. Whilst Degrelle was absent, nominal leadership of the party passed to Victor Matthys.

=== Formations de Combat ===
The Rexists had their paramilitary wing known as the Formations de Combat (Combat Formations), founded in 1940 and having around 4,000 members. Their members wore dark blue uniforms with the red Burgundian cross. Due to the constant depletion of its strength through members volunteering for more active forms of service in the German forces, the Formations had, by the end of 1943, virtually ceased to function.

=== Walloon Legion ===
The Walloon Legion (Légion Wallonie, lit. "Wallonia Legion") was a unit of the German Army (Wehrmacht) and later of the Waffen-SS recruited among French-speaking collaborationists in German-occupied Belgium during World War II.

Established in July 1941, the Walloon Legion was envisaged by Léon Degrelle's Rexist Party as a means of demonstrating its loyalty and political indispensability in German-occupied Belgium where it had been largely ignored since the German invasion of May 1940. Degrelle himself enlisted and increasingly saw the unit as a more important political vehicle than the Rexist Party. It participated in fighting on the Eastern Front from February 1942 but struggled to find sufficient recruits in Belgium to replace its persistently heavy losses.

The unit was integrated into the Waffen-SS in June 1943 as the SS Assault Brigade Wallonia (SS-Sturmbrigade Wallonien) and was almost destroyed by Soviet forces in the Korsun–Cherkassy Pocket in February 1944. It expanded slightly after the Allied Liberation of Belgium in September 1944 as Belgian, French, and Spanish collaborators were drafted into the unit. It was upgraded to the notional status of a division and re-designated as the SS Volunteer Grenadier Division Wallonia (SS-Freiwilligen-Grenadier-Division Wallonien) in October 1944. After heavy losses during the 1945 retreats, its remaining personnel surrendered to British forces in April 1945.

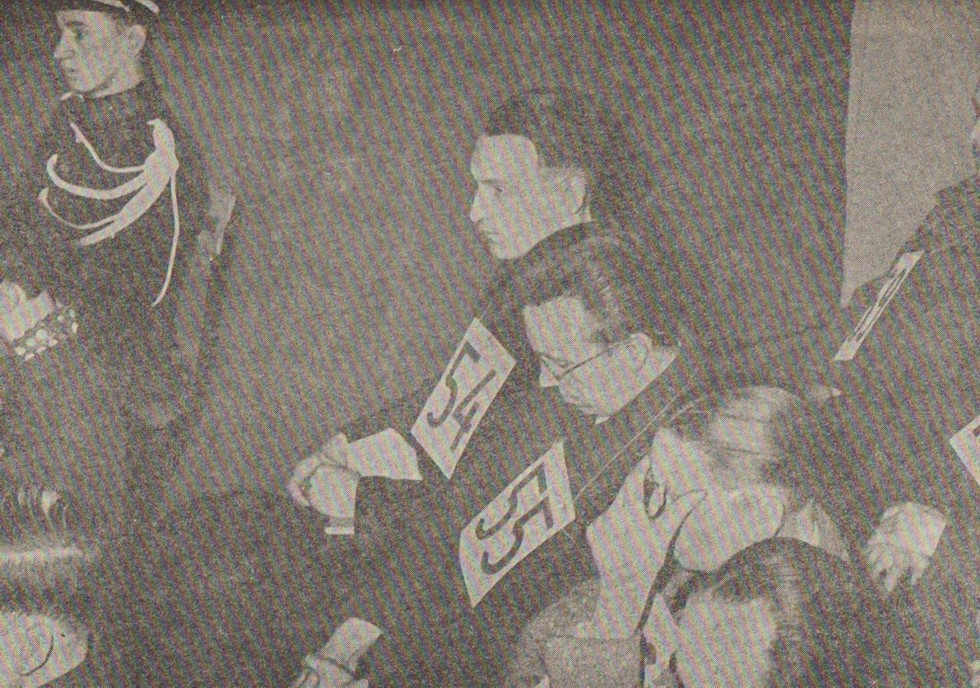
Victor Matthijs (54), interim head of Rex, and Louis Collard (55), head of Rex's political department, listen to the explanations given by one or other of their subordinates.

== End of Rexism ==
The party had been banned from the liberation of Belgium in September 1944. With the fall of Nazi Germany in 1945, many former Rexists were imprisoned or executed for their role during collaboration. Victor Matthys and José Streel were both executed by firing squad, Jean Denis (who had played only a minor role during the war) was imprisoned. On March 30, 1945, at a meeting between Degrelle, Matthys and Louis Collard in Germany, the Rexist movement was officially dissolved.

Degrelle took refuge in Francoist Spain. He was convicted of treason in absentia in Belgium and sentenced to death, but repeated requests to extradite him were turned down by the Spanish government. Stripped of his citizenship and excommunicated (later lifted in Germany), Degrelle died in Málaga in 1994.

=== Execution in a Charleroi barracks ===
On November 10, 1947, Collard and Matthys were shot along with 25 other members of the Rexist movement convicted of their crimes. Collard was part of the first firing squad scheduled for 7:30 a.m. After smoking his last cigarette, he was visibly overwhelmed and devastated by what awaited him and needed to be carried by the police to his execution post.

== Leaders ==
| No. | Leader (birth–death) | Portrait | Constituency or title | Took office | Left office |
|---|---|---|---|---|---|
| 1 | Léon Degrelle (1906–1994) | | Leader of the Rexist Party | 2 November 1935 | July 1941 |
| 2 | Victor Matthys (1914–1947) | | Leader of the Rexist Party | July 1941 | August 1944 |
| 3 | Louis Collard (1915–1947) | | Leader of the Rexist Party | August 1944 | 30 March 1945 |

== Election results ==
| Election year | # of overall votes | % of overall vote | # of overall seats won | +/− | Government |
|---|---|---|---|---|---|
| 1936 | 271,481 | 11.49 (#4) | 21 / 202 (10%) | ▲21 | in opposition |
| 1939 | 83,047 | 4.25 (#6) | 4 / 202 (2%) | ▼17 | in opposition |

== See also ==
- Paul Colin
- Pierre Daye

== Bibliography ==
- Conway, Martin (1993). Collaboration in Belgium: Leon Degrelle and the Rexist Movement 1940–1944. Yale University Press. ISBN 0-300-05500-5.
- de Bruyne, Eddy; Rikmenspoel, Marc (2004). For Rex and For Belgium: Leon Degrelle and Walloon Political & Military Collaboration 1940–45. Helion. ISBN 1-874622-32-9.
- De Wever, Bruno (2007). "Catholicism and Fascism in Belgium". Totalitarian Movements and Political Religions. 8 (2): 343–352. doi:10.1080/14690760701321312. S2CID 219628646.
- Kossmann, E. H. (1978). The Low Countries, 1780–1940. Clarendon Press. ISBN 9780198221081.
- Littlejohn, David. The Patriotic Traitors: A History of Collaboration in German-occupied Europe, 1940–45. ISBN 0-434-42725-X
- Streel, José. La révolution du XXème siècle (réédition du livre paru en 1942 à la NSE à Bruxelles), préface de Lionel Baland, Déterna, Paris, 2010.
- Colignon, Alain (2001). "DEGRELLE, Léon" (PDF). Biographie Nationale de Belgique (in French). Vol. VI. Royal Academy of Science, Letters and Fine Arts of Belgium. pp. 111–123. ISSN 0776-3948. Archived (PDF) from the original on 30 August 2021.
- David Stahel, Joining Hitler's Crusade Chapter 10 Belgium, Cambridge University Press, 15 December 2017
- Warmbrunn, Werner (1993). The German Occupation of Belgium 1940–1944. Peter Lang. ISBN 0820417734.
- Wouters, Nico (2016). Mayoral Collaboration Under Nazi Occupation in Belgium, the Netherlands and France, 1938–46. Palgrave Macmillan. ISBN 9783319328416.
- Wouters, Nico (2018). "Belgium". In Stahel, David (ed.). Joining Hitler's Crusade: European Nations and the Invasion of the Soviet Union, 1941. Cambridge University Press. pp. 260–287. ISBN 9781316510346.
