= Jules Hiernaux =

Belgian politician

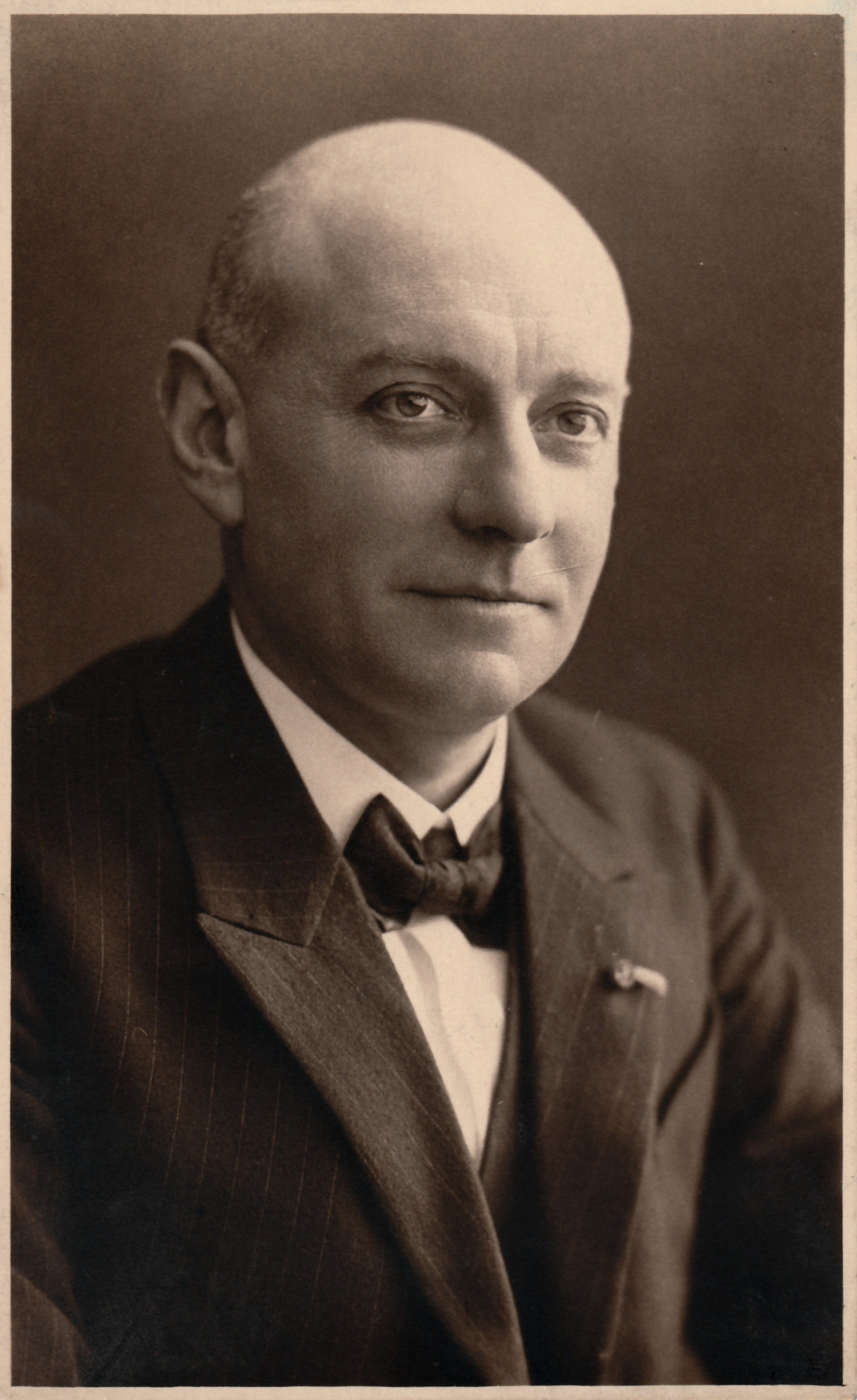
- Born: 27 July 1881; Charleroi, Belgium
- Died: c. 29 July 1944 (aged 63); Montigny-le-Tilleul, Belgium
- Occupation: politician

Jules Hiernaux (French pronunciation: [ʒyl jɛʁno]; 27 July 1881 – c. 29 July 1944), was a Belgian politician.

He was the founder, and later, director of Université du Travail (E: university of Labor) in Charleroi. Jules Hiernaux was assassinated by members of the rexist movement at his home during the night of 28 to 29 July 1944.

He was Minister of Public Education and Grand Master of the Grand Orient of Belgium from 1937 until 1939.

== Sources ==
- University of Labor (history)
- William L. Fox (1997). Lodge of the Double-headed Eagle (c). University of Arkansas Press. p. 254. ISBN 978-1-61075-243-5.
