= Jean Denis (politician) =

Belgian politician and writer (1902–1992)

- Born: Jean Denis; 10 November 1902; Chastre-Villeroux-Blanmont, Belgium
- Died: 16 March 1992
- Known for: Political ideologue
- Notable work: Principes Rexistes, Bases Doctrinales de Rex
- Political party: Rexist Party

Jean Denis (10 November 1902 – 10 March 1992) was a Belgian politician and writer. Through his written work he was the chief ideologue of the Rexist movement.

A native of Chastre-Villeroux-Blanmont in Walloon Brabant, Denis was educated to doctorate level. He first became involved in politics with the radical Catholic movements, serving as secretary to Monsignor Louis Picard. Léon Degrelle had also been a member of Picard's Action Catholique de la Jeunesse Belge and it was that movement's publishing house, Éditions Rex, that inspired the name of Rexism. As such Denis was almost inevitably drawn to Rexism and he served as a deputy for Namur between 1936 and 1939.

Denis two main books were Principes Rexistes and Bases Doctrinales de Rex, both published in 1936. Within these books he argued that Rex was more of a popular movement than a political party and endorsed a policy that sought to restore dignity to Belgium through a new hierarchical state. As such he demonstrated an influence of Integralismo Lusitano, which held similar views with regard to Portugal, on Rexist thought.

Under the Nazi German occupation Denis collaborated with the occupiers and wrote regularly for Le Pays Réel. He was imprisoned after the war for his activity but his fairly minor involvement saw him released in 1951. He settled in Dion-le-Val, Chaumont-Gistoux following his release and disappeared into obscurity.
