= Victor Matthys =

Belgian politician (1914–1947)

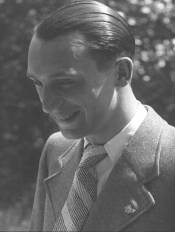

Leader of the Rexist Party
- In office July 1941 – August 1944
- Preceded by: Léon Degrelle
- Succeeded by: Louis Collard

Personal details
- Born: Victor Matthys; 20 March 1914 Anderlecht, Belgium
- Died: 10 November 1947 (aged 33) Charleroi, Belgium
- Cause of death: Execution by firing squad
- Known for: Politician, propagandist

Victor Matthys (20 March 1914 – 10 November 1947) was a Belgian politician who served as both deputy and acting leader of the Rexist Party. He was later executed for collaboration with Nazi Germany.

An early member of the Rexist movement, Matthys took over the editorship of the party newspaper, Le Pays Réel, in 1936 and in May 1941 was promoted to director of propaganda. He became official leader of Rex that same July after Léon Degrelle left to serve in the Waffen SS. He was nominated for the position as he was a weak character who posed no real threat to Degrelle's position as leader. Matthys was also popular with the Germans as he had a long-standing admiration for Adolf Hitler.

As Rexist leader Matthys proved as weak and ineffective as Degrelle had hoped, although he also demonstrated a propensity towards violence to mask his failings. His position eventually came under scrutiny after he ordered the massacre of 20 people in Courcelles as a reprisal against resistance activity. The move was roundly condemned as being too heavy-handed and Matthys gave up the leadership of the Rexists in favour of Louis Collard. He was sentenced to death for collaborationism and executed.
