= Le Pays Réel =

Belgian Catholic-Fascist newspaper

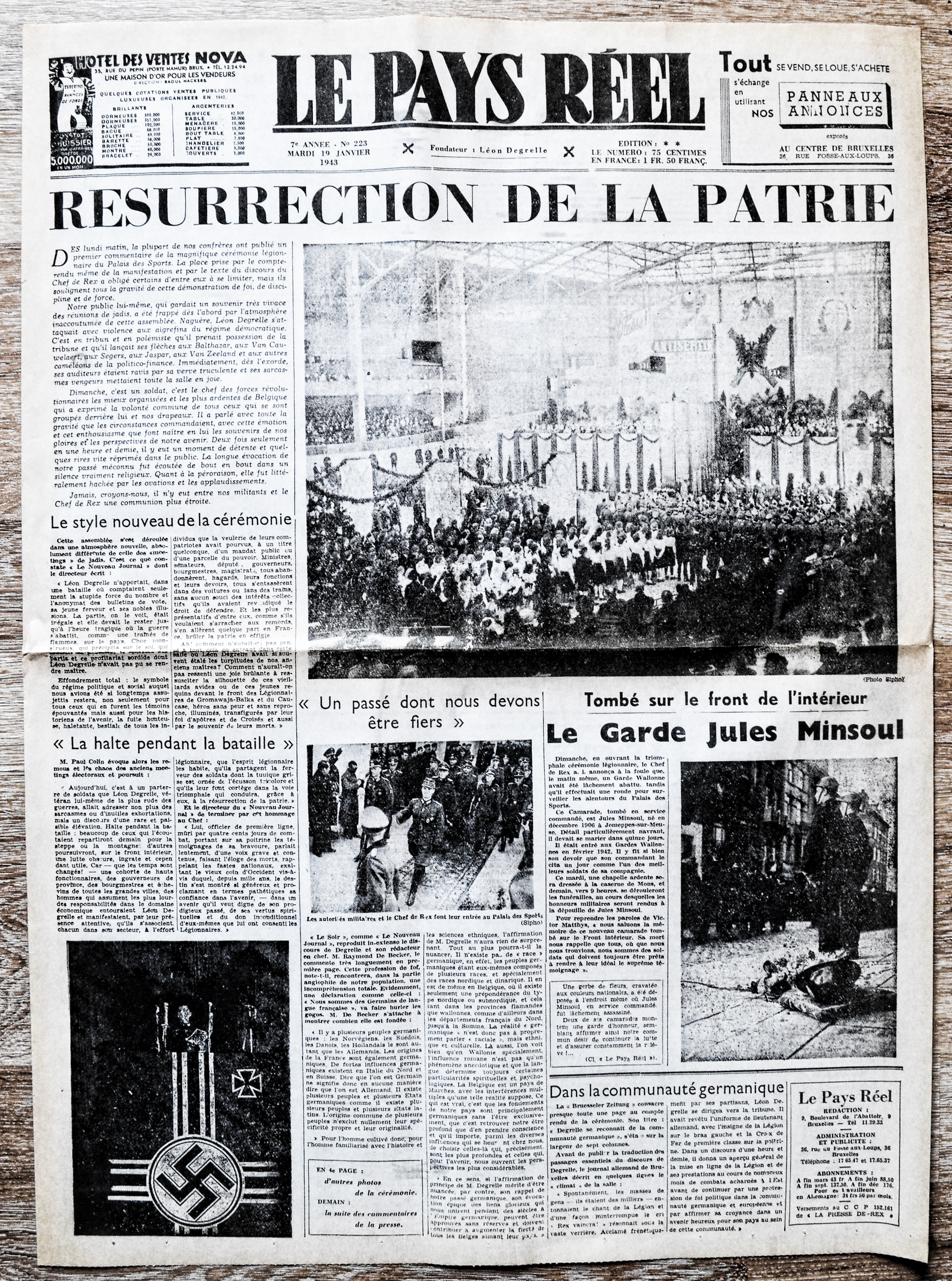
- The newspaper's frontpage on 19 January 1943
- Founder: Léon Degrelle
- Editor-in-chief: Hubert d'Ydewalle; José Streel; Victor Matthys
- Founded: 3 May 1936
- Ceased publication: 2 September 1944
- Political alignment: Rexism
- Language: Walloon
- Country: Belgium (1936-40); Military Administration in Belgium and Northern France (1940-44); Reichskommissariat Belgien-Nordfrankreich (1944)

Le Pays Réel (Walloon pronunciation: [lə pei ʁeɛl]; lit. 'The Real Country') was a Catholic-Fascist newspaper published by the Rexist Party in Belgium. Its first issue appeared on 3 May 1936 and it continued to be published during the Second World War. It was briefly edited by Victor Matthys. While Le Pays Réel remained the main paper of Rex, it was just one of several published by the group, or subsumed under Rexist control, during the war.

The newspaper's title derives from the writings of Charles Maurras, a French nationalist, who distinguished between a pays réel, rooted in the realities of life such as locality, work, trades, the parish and the family, and a pays légal (transl. legal country) of law, constitutionalism, and liberal political ideals which he cast as artificially imposed on the "real".

== See also ==
- Belgium in World War II
- German occupation of Belgium during World War II
- Je suis partout
