= Mons Memorial Museum =

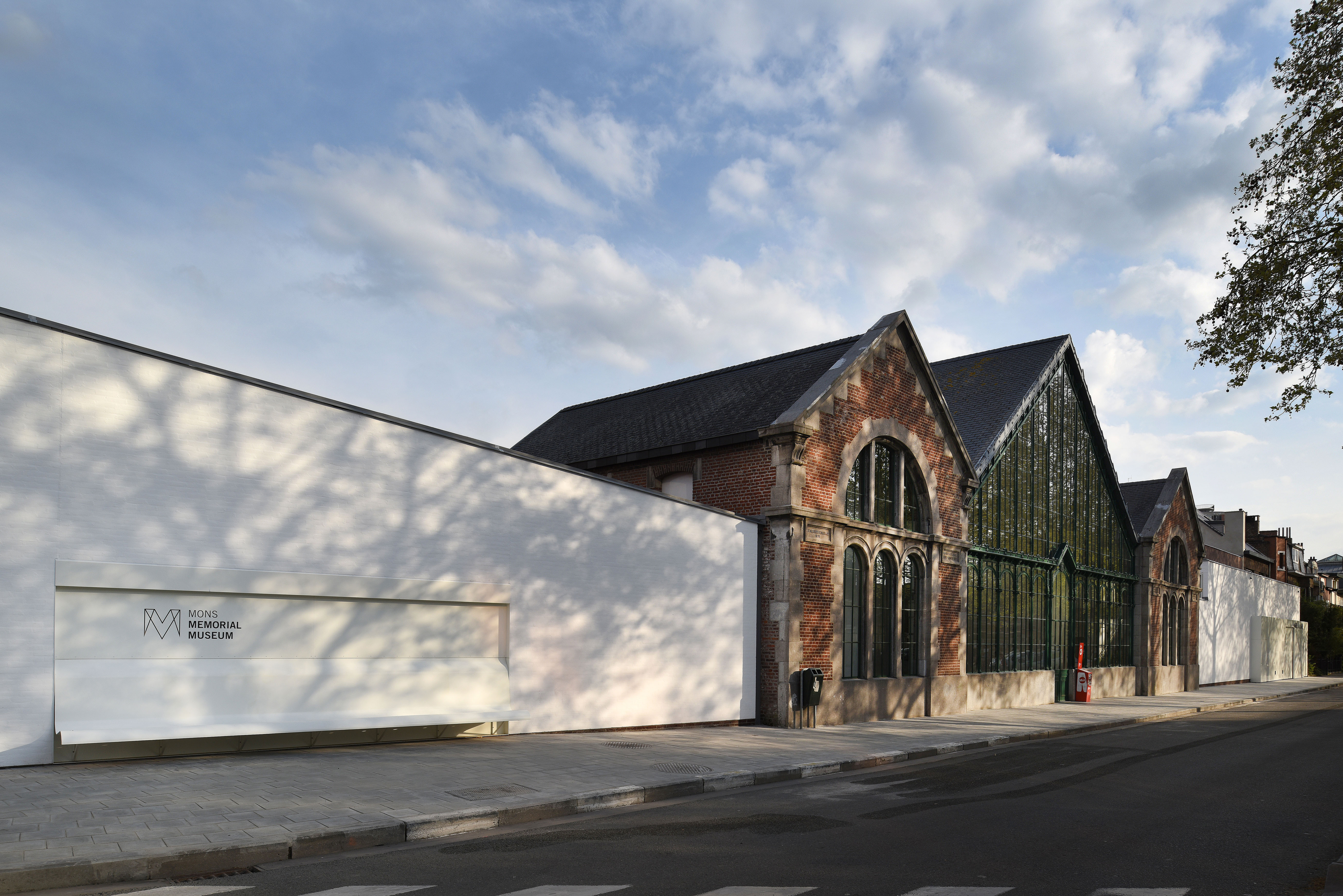
- The exterior of the museum.
- Location: 51 Boulevard Dolez; Mons, Belgium
- Coordinates: 50°27′00″N 3°57′25″E
- Type: Military museum
- Website: musees-expos.mons.be/nos-lieux/mons-memorial-museum/

Mons Memorial Museum (MMM) is a museum located in Mons, Hainaut Province in Belgium focusing on the military history of the region, with particular focus on World War I and World War II.

Formerly known as the Museum of Military History of Mons (French: Musée d’Histoire militaire de Mons), the museum was opened in 2015 in the year that Mons was a joint European Capital of Culture. It is located in the former municipal water pumping station known as the Machine-à-Eau (lit. 'water machine') built in 1871 which was extended as part of the museum project.

The museum's permanent collection includes more than 5,000 artefacts and is displayed over 1,200 square metres (13,000 sq ft).

It also hosts regular temporary exhibitions. For example, in July 2025, a temporary exhibition opened called 'L'esprit carcéral', focusing on four people once imprisoned in Mons prison: the 19th century French poet Paul Verlaine, poet and World War Two Belgian Resistance member Marguerite Bervoets, her resistance colleague Cécile Detournay, and their contemporary, Fernand Dumont, a Belgian poet, lawyer and resistance writer.
