= George Bastin =

Australian rules footballer

Personal information
- Full name: George Ernest Bastin
- Born: 20 August 1893; Malvern, Victoria
- Died: 13 March 1947 (aged 53); Warragul, Victoria

Playing career^{1}
Years	Club	Games (Goals)
1915	St Kilda	1 (2)
- ^{1} Playing statistics correct to the end of 1915.

George Ernest Bastin (20 August 1893 – 13 March 1947) was an Australian rules footballer who played with St Kilda in the Victorian Football League (VFL).
