= Marguerite Bervoets =

Belgian resistance fighter

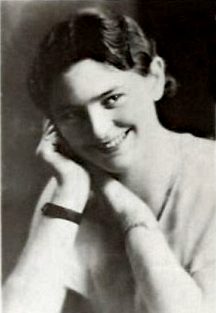
- Born: 6 March 1914; La Louvière, Belgium
- Died: 7 August 1944 (aged 30); Wolfenbüttel, Germany
- Occupation: Resistance Fighter
- Years active: 1942–1944

Signature
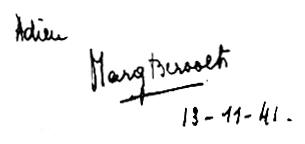

Marguerite Bervoets (6 March 1914 – 7 August 1944) was a Belgian poet, teacher and member of the Belgian Resistance during World War II. She was arrested while carrying out resistance work and executed in Wolfenbüttel prison, in Germany.

== Biography ==
Marguerite Bervoets was born in La Louvière. She was a graduate in philosophy and literature, and a poet. At the time of the German invasion of Belgium she was working as a teacher in Tournai. After the fall of Belgium to Nazi Germany, Bervoets began publishing the underground resistance paper "La Deliverance". She helped transfer intelligence to the Allied Powers.

On 8 August 1942 Bervoets and another resistance member, Cécile Detournay, went to the edge of Chièvres Airfield for the purpose of photographing newly installed anti-aircraft guns. They were both carrying a shopping bag and a camera, once they reached the edge of the airfield they began to take pictures. A few minutes later a German sentry caught them by surprise and escorted them both to an officer nearby. They both showed their shopping bags and claimed that they were going to a nearby farm to get some food and take pictures of the fields. Unfortunately the German lieutenant ordered an investigation. A woman, a prosecution witness, provided evidence that led to the indictment of Bervoets and the leaders of the group to which she belonged. At Bervoets's house they discovered weapons. She sensed her fate, and in high school she would often quote Maeterlinck, saying; "It is beautiful to when one sacrifices oneself, that sacrifice brings happiness to other men".

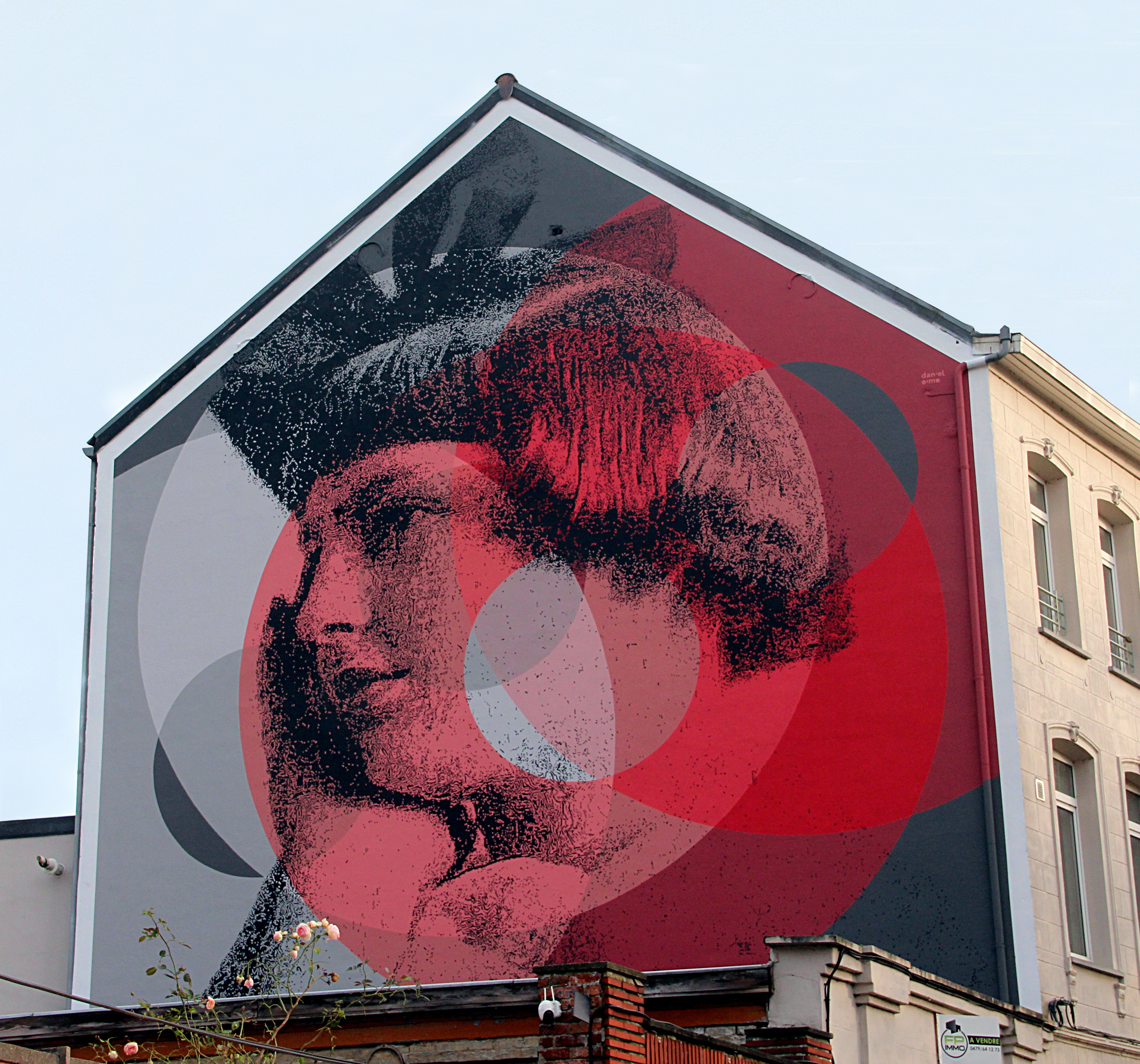
'Resistance' is a free street art work by Portuguese artist Daniel Eime as a tribute to Marguerite Bervoets.

After a few months of incarceration in Mons, Bervoets and Detournay were deported to Germany for their fates to be decided by the Volksgericht (People's Court) of Leer. Bervoets' trial was held on the same day as that of resistance fighter Fernande Volral. Both Bervoets and Volral were sentenced to death, and Detournay to 8 years of forced labour.

== Death ==
Marguerite Bervoets and Fernande Volral were executed by "fallbeil" (German guillotine) on 7 August 1944 in Wolfenbüttel, Germany. Cécile Detournay was liberated by US forces on 24 April 1945. Bervoets' family did not learn she had died until July 1945. She is buried in Mons communal cemetery.

== Recognition ==
- In honor of Marguerite Bervoets, the Lycée de Mons, where she had her last three years of humanities and where her mother was director, bears her name; today it is the Athénée Royal Marguerite Bervoets.
- On 17 November 1946, an inauguration in the courtyard of the École Moyenne de la rue de Bouvy in La Louvière, a monument dedicated to Marguerite Bervoets and Laurette Demaret, former students of this establishment.
- A street of Mons also bears her name, as well as a street of Forest (in Brussels) and a street of Guyancourt (near Paris).
- There are many monuments that pay tribute to her, both in Belgium (especially in La Louvière thanks to a monument and a commemorative plaque), and abroad (for example on the shores of Lake Como).
- The 151st promotion of Social and Military Sciences at the Royal Military Academy was sponsored by Marguerite Bervoets.
- At the school she taught at, a plaque in tribute to Marguerite Bervoets is installed in the entrance.
- In July 2025, a temporary exhibition opened at the Mons Memorial Museum called 'L'esprit carcéral' which focussed on Marguerite Bervoets and her resistance colleague Cécile Detournay (as well their contemporary Fernand Dumont, a Belgian poet, lawyer and resistance writer, and the 19th century French poet Paul Verlaine; all four were imprisoned in the Mons prison). It exhibited several of her personal artefacts, including her final letter to her parents.

== Bibliography ==
- Marguerite Bervoets, A Heroine, 1914–1944, L. Balasse-De Guide, The Renaissance of the Book, Brussels, 1958
- Marguerite Bervoets, E. Pequet, coll. The Notebooks of the Memory, HCD, 2014.
