= Courcelles, Belgium =

Municipality in Hainaut Province, Wallonia, Belgium

Courcelles Courcele (Walloon)
- Municipality
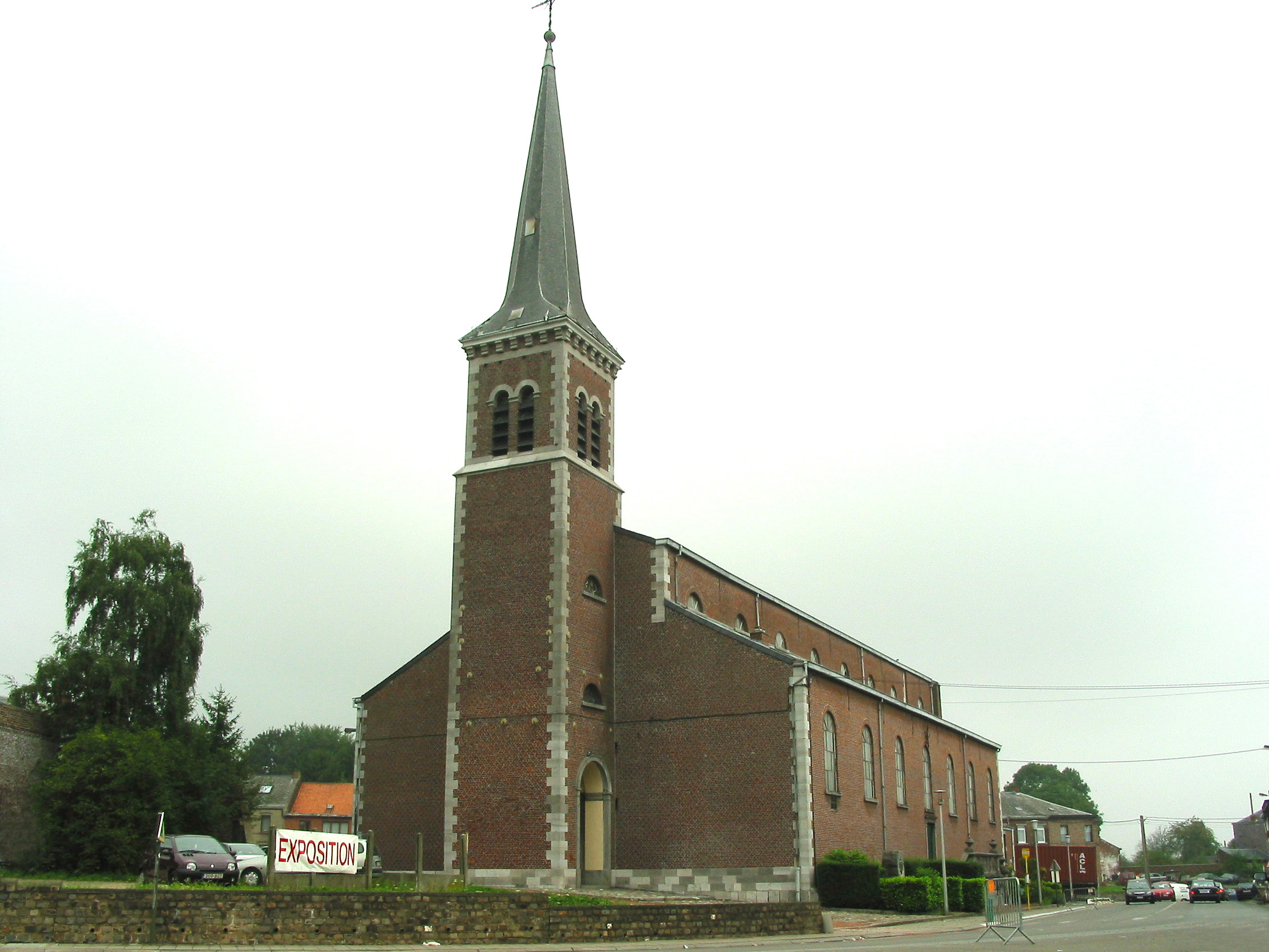
- St. Lambert's church

- Flag Coat of arms

- Location of Courcelles in Hainaut
- Interactive map of Courcelles
- Location in Belgium
- Coordinates: 50°28′N 04°22′E
- Country: Belgium
- Community: French Community
- Region: Wallonia
- Province: Hainaut
- Arrondissement: Charleroi

Government
  - Mayor: Caroline Taquin (MR)
  - Governing party: MR

Area
  - Total: 44.52 km^{2} (17.19 sq mi)

Population (2018-01-01)
  - Total: 31,376
  - Density: 704.8/km^{2} (1,825/sq mi)
- Postal codes: 6180-6183
- NIS code: 52015
- Area codes: 071
- Website: www.courcelles.be

Courcelles (French pronunciation: [kuʁsɛl]; Walloon: Courcele) is a municipality of Wallonia located in the province of Hainaut, Belgium.

As of January 1, 2006, Courcelles had a total population of 29,626. The total area is 44.24 km^{2} which gives a population density of 670 inhabitants per km^{2}.

The municipality consists of the following districts: Courcelles, Gouy-lez-Piéton, Souvret, and Trazegnies.

In 1944, the town was the site of the Courcelles Massacre of 20 civilians by Belgian collaborators. The event is commemorated by a plaque at the site.

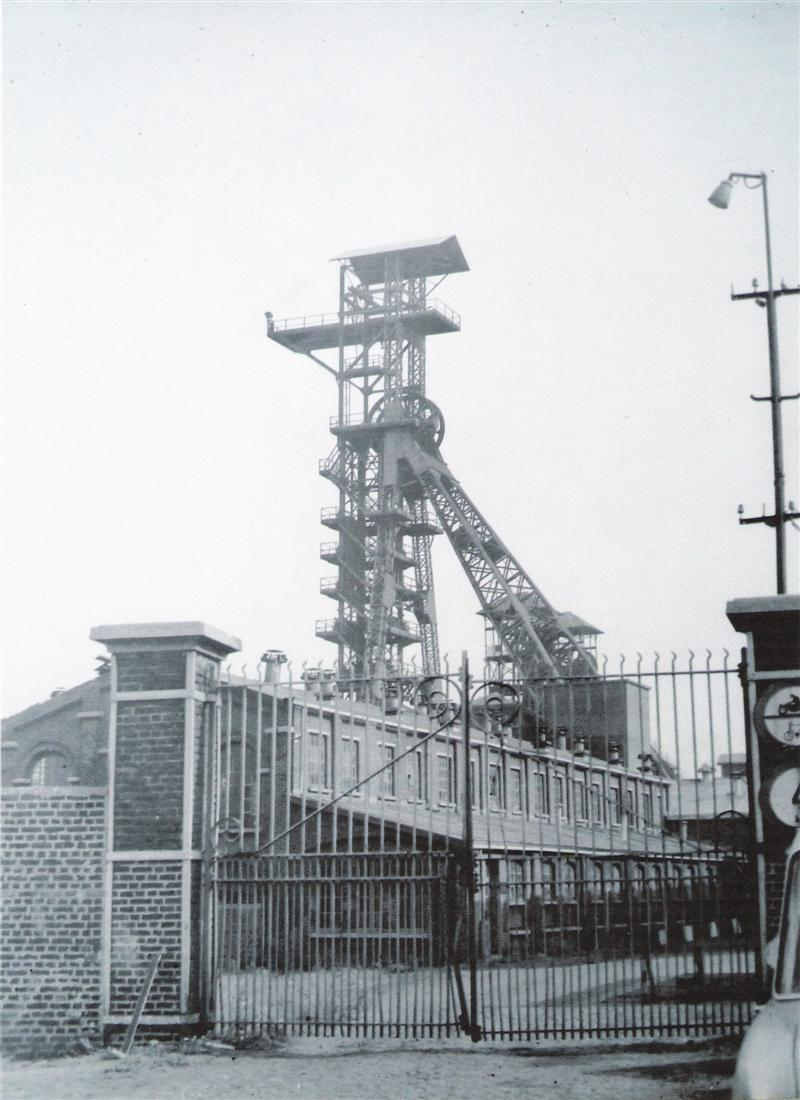
The coal mine "6 périer", Souvret

== History of the Mining Industry ==
In 1853, a company, called Société Anonyme des Charbonnages du Nord de Charleroi, was formed to bring together the various concessions located in Courcelles. The mining capacity was 19,000 tons in 1854. It reached 500,000 tons in 1930. The shafts were closed one by one and currently, no extraction shaft is in operation on the territory of Courcelles, but we can still see a lot of spoil tips which are now nice places for walking.

== Notable people ==
- Loïc Nottet, singer who finished second in the third season of The Voice Belgique in 2014 and represented Belgium in the Eurovision Song Contest 2015 which was held in Vienna, Austria
