= Jules Bastin (soldier) =

Belgian resistance member

Jules A. G. Bastin (March 23, 1889 – December 1, 1944) was an officer in the Belgian army during World War I and a resistance fighter in World War II.

During World War I, Bastin fought as in lieutenant in the Belgian 1^{er} régiment de Chasseurs à cheval. He became heavily wounded on 16 August 1914 and was captured by the Germans. He became famous during his captivity for repeated escape attempts. He eventually succeeded on his tenth try.

At the beginning of World War II, he held the rank of colonel and served as Chief of Staff of the Belgian Cavalry Corps. After the invasion of Belgium by the Germans in 1940 he fled to France and joined the underground movement by taking command of the Belgian Legion. The Belgian government based in London made him the commander of all their underground military forces on 30 December 1942. He was arrested twice, first in April 1943 and later in November 1943. After his arrest in November he was sent to the Gross-Rosen concentration camp where he died on 1 December 1944. The Belgian government promoted him to the rank of major general posthumously in August 1946.
