= Rexism =

Far-right political movement in 20th century Belgium

Flag of the Rexist Party

Rexism (French: Rexisme) is the far-right, nationalist movement in Belgium associated with the Rexist Party, active during the interwar period and World War II. It was founded between 1930 and 1935 by Léon Degrelle, a Catholic activist and journalist, out of the publishing house Christus Rex ("Christ the King"), which served as its ideological and organizational foundation. At its electoral peak in 1936 the Rexist Party won 21 of 202 seats in the Chamber of Representatives before collapsing into open collaboration with Nazi Germany during the occupation of Belgium.

Initially emerging from Catholic youth activism, Rexism developed into a distinctly Belgian form of fascism, combining authoritarian nationalism, corporatism, monarchism, and populist anti-establishment rhetoric, before radicalising into outright Nazi collaboration after 1940.

== History ==
=== Origins (1920s–1935) ===
The movement's roots lie in the world of Catholic student journalism in Leuven in the years following the First World War. As a law student at the Catholic University of Leuven, Léon Degrelle wrote for and helped run the student newspaper L'Avant-Garde, a vehicle for satirical journalism, pranks (notably the fabricated 1927 "Procès Dumas" hoax lawsuit), and early experiments in leadership and propaganda technique. Through this milieu Degrelle came into contact with Monseigneur Louis Picard, head of the Association Catholique de la Jeunesse Belge (ACJB), a Catholic Action organisation that trained young Catholics in publishing, propaganda, and "techniques of action." Picard, who had set out his vision of a confessional, corporatist, authoritarian state in La Doctrine catholique de l'État (1934), persuaded Degrelle and his circle in 1928 to abandon L'Avant-Garde and devote themselves to Catholic Action.

The ACJB's publishing arm, Les Éditions Rex, took its name from the contemporary European Catholic devotional movement of Christus Rex ("Christ the King"), popularised by Pope Pius XI's 1925 encyclical Quas Primas, which established the liturgical Feast of Christ the King. Degrelle took over direction of Les Éditions Rex in 1930, transforming it into a vehicle for political agitation against both the secular establishment and the existing Catholic Party leadership.

The movement's transition from publishing house to political party is conventionally dated to 2 November 1935, when Degrelle interrupted the annual congress of the Fédération des associations et cercles catholiques in Kortrijk, blocking the doors with his young supporters and denouncing the Catholic establishment — an episode publicised as the "Coup de Courtrai." A formal denunciation by Cardinal Joseph-Ernest van Roey, Archbishop of Mechelen, gave Degrelle further publicity, and in February 1936 he released the official programme of the new Rexist Party, drawing on the worldview of Christus Rex and his own journal, Rex.

=== Electoral history (1935–1939) ===
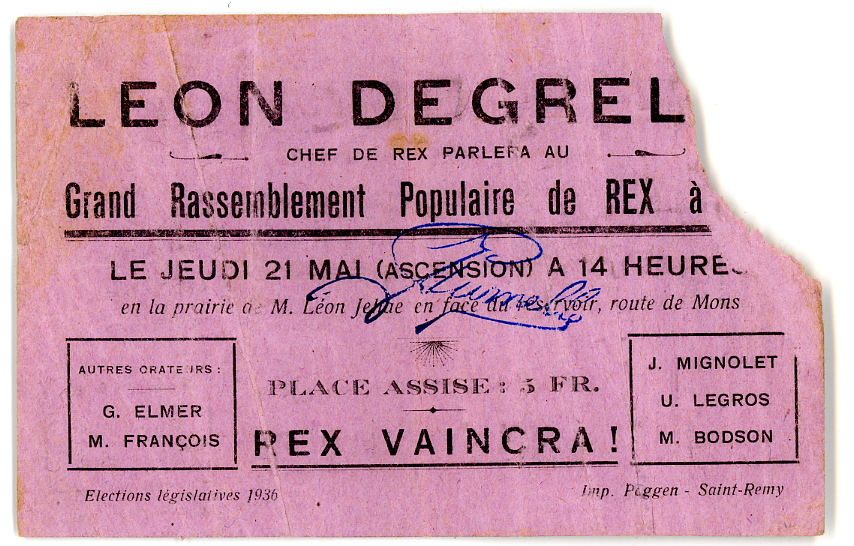
A 1936 Rexist rally addressed by Léon Degrelle, held during the party's breakthrough election campaign.

Rexism's rise coincided with the economic hardship that followed the 1935 devaluation of the Belgian franc and with paralysing divisions among the established political parties; the Rexists were the only party to systematically back the mass strikes of 1936. In the general election of 24 May 1936, the newly formed party won 11.49% of the national vote and 21 of 202 seats in the Chamber of Representatives — finishing less than a percentage point behind the long-established Liberal Party — though Degrelle himself narrowly failed to win a seat in Brussels' fourth arrondissement. Support was strongest in Wallonia, reaching 29% of the vote in the province of Belgian Luxembourg, but was comparatively weak in Flanders, where Rex competed against regionalist movements such as the Vlaams Nationaal Verbond (VNV) and Verdinaso.

The party's momentum proved difficult to sustain. An eight-month electoral alliance with the VNV, concluded in October 1936 to broaden anti-establishment support, alienated Rexists committed to Belgian national unity and collapsed within months. Combined with the political fallout from Degrelle's contacts with Nazi Germany and a damaging defeat in a 1937 by-election widely seen as a referendum on his leadership, Rexist support collapsed. In the final pre-war election of 2 April 1939, the party's vote share fell to 4.25%, reducing it to four seats — one of them Degrelle's — while the VNV, by contrast, gained ground.

=== World War II and collapse (1939–1945) ===
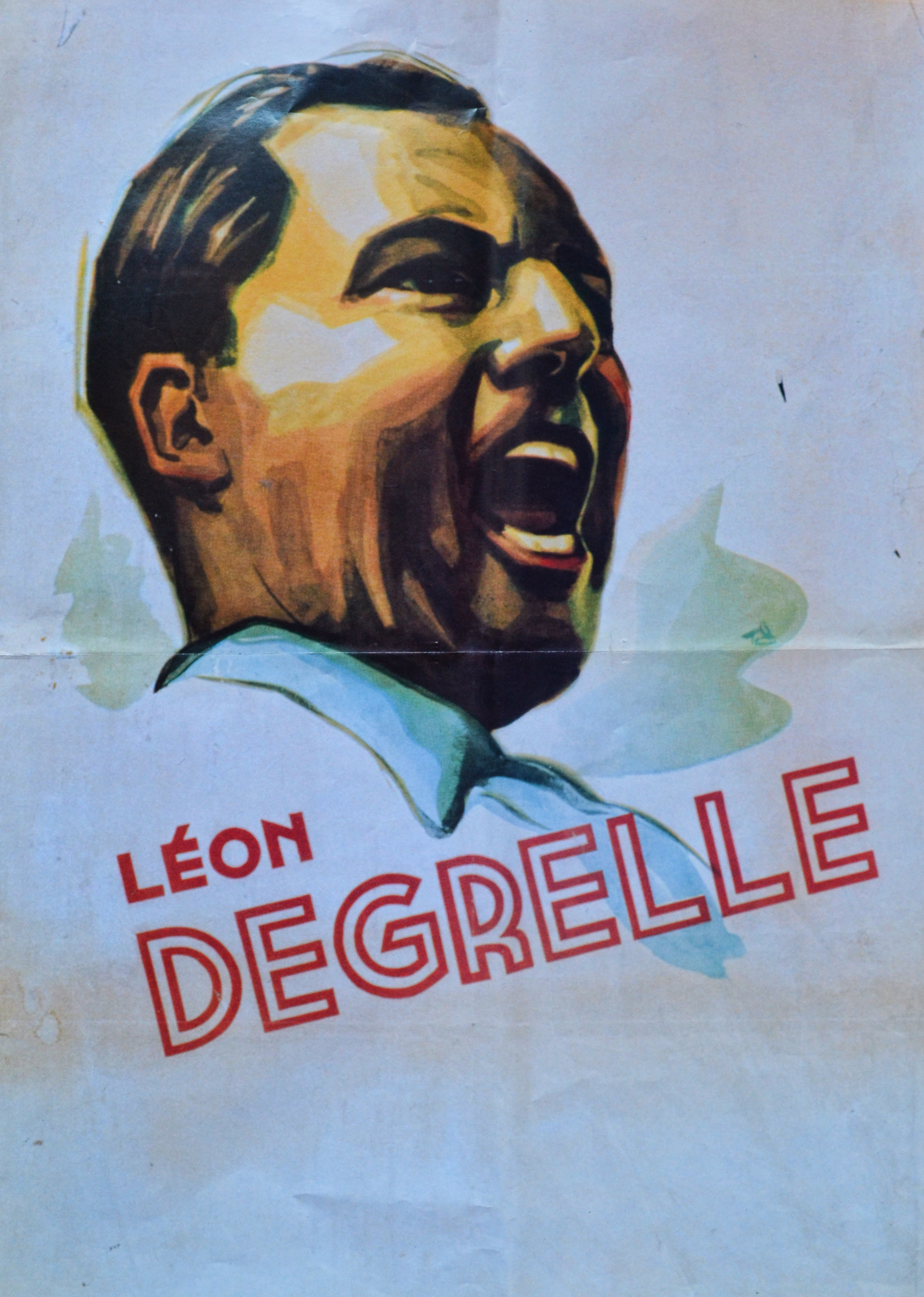
Waffen-SS propaganda material featuring Léon Degrelle, leader of the SS-Sturmbrigade/Division "Wallonie."

During the German occupation, Rexism became openly collaborationist, but its relationship with the occupying Militärverwaltung in Belgien und Nordfrankreich (MVBN) under Alexander von Falkenhausen was uneasy. The German administration favoured the divisive Flamenpolitik, promoting Flemish nationalism — chiefly through the VNV — over the unitary Belgian nationalism that Rexism continued nominally to espouse; Von Falkenhausen was reported to have privately described Degrelle as "unausstehlich" (insufferable). Even so, the Germans installed Rexists in a number of mayoral posts, mostly in Wallonia, and provided financial support to the movement.

A decisive shift came in late 1941, when Degrelle organised some 1,200 Belgian volunteers into the Walloon Legion to fight on the Eastern Front. After sustained lobbying of the SS and Wehrmacht, the unit was absorbed into the Waffen-SS as the SS-Wallonien on 1 June 1943, by which point Degrelle had declared the Walloons a "lost Germanic race whose destiny was to rejoin the German Reich." Rexism's increasing identification with the German war effort cemented its lasting reputation as a collaborationist movement in Belgian memory.

Brussels was liberated by Allied forces on 4 September 1944, and the government-in-exile of Hubert Pierlot returned days later to a hero's welcome; what remained of popular support for the Rexists at home evaporated as much of the party's hard core continued fighting alongside Degrelle on the Eastern Front. On 29 December 1944 the Belgian War Council sentenced Degrelle to death in absentia, and the Rexist Party was formally dissolved on 30 March 1945. Remnants of the movement fought on with German forces to the end of the war, including in the defence of the Cherkassy pocket and a final stand in Estonia in April 1945.

== Ideology ==
Rexism originated within Catholic Action circles and was initially focused on the moral and religious reform of Belgian society. Its early ideological framework owed much to Picard's corporatist, authoritarian conception of a Catholic state, in which political authority derived from God rather than from the people, and in which Church and State operated as separate but collaborating spheres of authority.

=== Rex as a "movement" ===
Rexist theorists, chiefly Degrelle's ally Jean Denis and the party philosopher José Streel, were emphatic that Rex was not a conventional party or interest group but a "movement" — fluid, perpetually active, and unbound by fixed programme. Rexist literature described the movement in explicitly generational and quasi-religious terms, as a "revolution of youth, of unity, and of soul" (révolution des âmes), aimed less at institutional reform than at the moral regeneration of the Belgian people. Membership demanded near-total subordination of the individual to the collective and unconditional obedience to Degrelle as Chef de Rex.

=== The corporatist state and the "three communities" ===
Rexist political theory, developed chiefly by Denis in Principes rexistes and Bases doctrinales de Rex (both 1936), envisaged society organised around three hierarchically nested "natural communities": the family, the workplace, and the nation. The State's role was conceived as supervisory rather than directly administrative ("diriger, surveiller, stimuler, contenir"), with most practical governance devolved to corporative professional organisations representing each trade or profession — exemplified by the short-lived Confédération Agricole Rexiste, founded after the 1936 elections to organise farmers into a hierarchy of local, district, and national bodies. Rex described itself as "liberal-authoritarian," claiming to combine the order of dictatorship with continued scope for individual initiative, and rejected nationalisation as a Socialist or Communist concept antithetical to its corporatism.

Rexism was explicitly monarchist, drawing on the political theory of Charles Maurras and Action Française. The king was cast as the unifying emblem of the nation and the only figure able to balance authority with restraint, appointing ministers and corporative councils while leaving most legislative initiative to the corporative bodies themselves; Parliament was correspondingly reduced to ratifying budgets and laws drafted elsewhere.

=== Family, gender, and morality ===
Rexist doctrine treated the family as the foundational "natural community" and source of all social morality, and the Rexist state described in Denis's writings would have outlawed contraception and divorce, mandated capital punishment for women who obtained abortions, and used tax and housing policy to encourage large families. Women were granted the right to vote — extended, in Rex's rhetoric, as a mark of "respect for the mother" — but not the right to stand for national office; their social role was defined as maternal and domestic, with strict segregation of the sexes prescribed in workplaces. Historian Gabriella Newes-Adeyi characterises this gender doctrine as "more retrograde than new," noting its continuity with nineteenth-century Catholic conceptions of separate spheres for men and women.

=== Relationship to Fascism and Nazism ===
In its formative years (1935–1936), Rexism shared more in common with Catholic corporatist movements — Portuguese Estado Novo integralism, Austrian Austrofascism, and Spanish Falangism — than with German National Socialism, which Degrelle at the time dismissed as a blend of "Prussian militarism and pagan racism." Degrelle publicly insisted in this period that Rex sought power only through legal, democratic means, declaring "Pas de violence" and "la victoire dans la paix," and denying any intention of imitating Hitler or Mussolini.

Contemporary academic analysis identified genuine convergences with Nazism — both movements were authoritarian, anti-communist, populist, and corporatist — but noted that race was largely absent from pre-war Rexist ideology, in contrast to its centrality for the NSDAP; Rex's rhetoric instead focused on an alleged "Judeo-Communist" conspiracy, expressed more in economic than racial terms and not systematised until the late 1930s. Following its electoral breakthrough in 1936, and especially after 1939, Rexism radicalised and converged far more closely with Italian Fascism and Nazism, adopting paramilitary uniforms and salutes modelled on the NSDAP.

== International relations ==
Rexism's electoral success in 1936 drew the attention of Fascist Italy and Nazi Germany alike. Within months of the election Degrelle met both Benito Mussolini and Adolf Hitler, and the party received substantial financial backing from both regimes; later investigations found that Degrelle had received roughly 19 million Belgian francs (c. $600,000) from Mussolini. German support, channelled through contacts such as Otto Abetz and the Reich propaganda ministry's press-supply organisation Cautio, was most intense between 1936 and 1937, during a September 1936 visit in which Degrelle and fellow Rexist parliamentarians met Hitler, von Ribbentrop, and Abetz in Berlin, reportedly receiving 250,000 Reichsmarks usable only within Germany. Reich support fell away sharply after Rex's 1937 electoral setback and the collapse of the VNV alliance, only reviving once the German occupation began in 1940.

== Léon Degrelle ==
Born on 15 June 1906 in Bouillon, the son of a brewer, Degrelle studied law at Leuven before entering Catholic publishing circles. As the self-styled Chef de Rex, Degrelle was inseparable from the movement he founded; many voters were drawn as much by his oratory and youth — he was 28 at the time of the 1936 election, and had to instruct several of his own, even younger, parliamentarians on basic procedure — as by Rexist policy itself.

After fleeing the collapsing Eastern Front in April 1945 — reportedly aboard a Heinkel aircraft arranged with the help of Vidkun Quisling, which crash-landed near San Sebastián — Degrelle obtained political asylum in Franco's Spain, where he lived for the rest of his life, evading repeated Belgian extradition requests through false identities and eventually Spanish citizenship by adoption and remarriage. He ran a construction business and a neo-Nazi publishing house in Málaga, remained a vocal apologist for the Third Reich in essays, pamphlets, and broadcasts into the 1990s, and died in 1994. Degrelle's wartime exploits and postwar longevity as, in his admirers' eyes, the "last fascist leader" generated a substantial mythology, including unverifiable claims that Hitler had told him "if I had a son, I would want him to be like you."

== Postwar legacy and memory ==
Rexism's memory has continued to surface in Belgian political life long after the party's dissolution. In 2005 it emerged that Koen Dillen, son of Vlaams Blok founder Karel Dillen, had visited Degrelle in Spain during the 1990s. The movement's legacy has also been invoked across the country's linguistic divide: when critics raised the wartime record of Flemish-nationalist politician Bart De Wever's ancestors, De Wever responded that Belgium's "most notorious" collaborator had been Degrelle, a Walloon, and argued that Flanders had reckoned with its own collaborationist past more openly than Wallonia had with Rexism.

== Historiography ==
Scholarly study of Rexism developed slowly, owing to the political sensitivity of fascism in Belgium. Étienne (1968) remains a foundational study. Later historians, notably Conway (1993), have emphasised Rexism's wartime collaboration and ideological evolution.

== Legacy ==
Rexism is regarded as one of the principal expressions of fascism in Belgium, alongside the rival Flemish nationalist movements VNV and Verdinaso. Its collaboration with Nazi Germany contributed to its lasting negative reputation, particularly in Wallonia, even as its memory continues to be invoked in disputes over regional and national identity.
