= Léon Degrelle =

Belgian politician and Nazi collaborator (1906–1994)

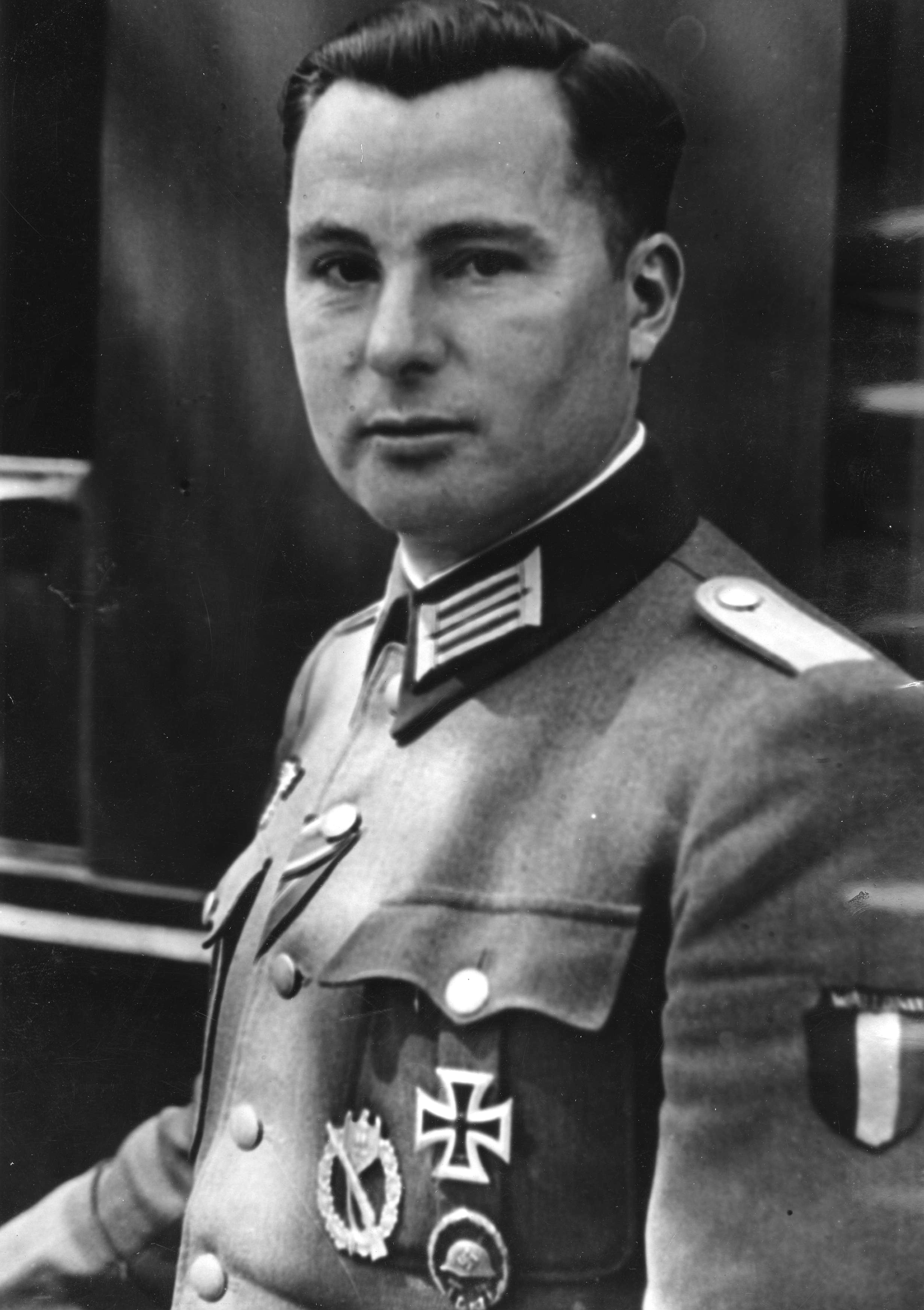
- Degrelle during WWII

Leader of the Rexist Party
- In office 2 November 1935 – July 1941
- Preceded by: Office established
- Succeeded by: Victor Matthys

Head of the Walloon Liberation Committee
- In office 8 December 1944 – January 1945
- Preceded by: Office established
- Succeeded by: Office abolished

Personal details
- Born: 15 June 1906 Bouillon, Belgium
- Died: 31 March 1994 (aged 87) Málaga, Spain
- Party: Rexist Party
- Spouse(s): Marie Lemay (m. 1932; died 1984) Jeanne Brevet Charbonneau (m. 1984)
- Children: 5

Military service
- Allegiance: Nazi Germany
- Branch/service: German Army (1941–43); Schutzstaffel (1943–45)
- Years of service: 1941–45
- Rank: Oberführer
- Commands: SS Division Wallonien
- Battles/wars: World War II; Eastern Front
- Awards: Knight's Cross of the Iron Cross with Oak Leaves; German Cross

Léon Joseph Marie Ignace Degrelle (French: [dəgʁɛl]; 15 June 1906 – 31 March 1994) was a Belgian Walloon politician and Nazi collaborator. He rose to prominence in Belgium in the 1930s as the leader of the Rexist Party (Rex). During the German occupation of Belgium during World War II, he enlisted in the German army and fought in the Walloon Legion on the Eastern Front. After the collapse of the Nazi regime, Degrelle escaped and went into exile in Francoist Spain, where he remained a prominent figure in neo-Nazi politics.

Degrelle was raised Roman Catholic and during his years at university became involved in politics through journalism. In the early 1930s, he took control of a Catholic publishing house that morphed under his leadership into the Rexist Party. Rex contested the 1936 Belgian general election and won 11 percent of the vote, but slipped into irrelevance by the start of World War II. Degrelle began to collaborate with Nazi Germany as the war began and was detained by Belgian and then French authorities. After the German invasion of Belgium in mid-1940, Degrelle was released and began to change Rex into a mass movement to curry the favor of the Nazis. In 1941, Degrelle organized and himself joined and fought in the Walloon Legion, a unit of the German Army and, after 1943, the Waffen-SS. His role in the combat at the Cherkassy pocket in 1944 and subsequent military decorations turned him into a model for foreign collaborators.

Following the liberation of Belgium in late 1944, Degrelle was stripped of his citizenship and was sentenced to death in absentia. Early the next year, he fled to Spain, where with the help of the Spanish government he went into hiding from Belgian authorities in August 1946. In the 1960s, Degrelle returned to public life as a neo-Nazi and gained great influence in far-right European circles. He published several books and papers glorifying the Nazi regime and denying the Holocaust.

== Early life ==
Léon Degrelle was born on 15 June 1906 in Bouillon, in the Belgian province of Luxembourg, and baptized five days later as Léon Joseph Marie Ignace Degrelle. He was the fifth child of Marie Boever and Édouard Degrelle.

Édouard, who came from the French Ardennes, later claimed that he had emigrated to Belgium as a result of the introduction of secularism in France. He made a career as a brewer and became a naturalized citizen before World War I. He was elected to the provincial council of Luxembourg for the first time in 1904 and became a respected conservative politician as a member of the Catholic Party. Marie came from a local bourgeois family whose father had been involved in the founding of the newspaper L'Avenir du Luxembourg.

The Degrelle family was highly religious; as a child, Léon attended Mass every day and attended a preschool run by the Sisters of Christian Doctrine of Nancy. He completed secondary schooling at the Institut Saint-Pierre de Bouillon. From there, he enrolled at the Collège Notre-Dame de la Paix, in Namur, where he read and subscribed to the ideas of Léon Bloy, Charles Péguy, Léon Daudet, and especially Charles Maurras. Degrelle next enrolled at the Facultés universitaires Notre-Dame de la Paix in Namur to study law. There, however, he became active in clericalist political activism to the detriment of his studies, which he abandoned in 1925 after failing his exams that year.

== Journalistic career, 1927–1935 ==
Shortly after his failure at Namur, Degrelle was admitted into the prestigious Catholic University of Leuven, which awarded him a diploma of candidacy in philosophy and literature on 27 July 1927. That year, Degrelle joined Catholic Action for the Belgian Youth (Action catholique de la jeunesse belge, ACJB), a militant clerical youth organization founded by the priest Louis Picard, whom Degrelle had met while studying in Namur. Again preoccupied with activism and reading, Degrelle was a poor student but encountered some professional success as the director of the student newspaper L'Avant-Garde. At this time, Degrelle also began a successful career as a writer and published several books from 1927 to 1930.

Impressed by Degrelle, Picard encouraged him to become involved in journalism within the ACJB from 1927. The next year, Degrelle began writing pro-monarchy, clericalist pamphlets whose wide circulation brought Degrelle to the attention of Abbé Norbert Wallez, another Catholic priest and an admirer of Italian fascist leader Benito Mussolini, who worked as a newspaper director. Degrelle accepted an offer from Wallez to become an editor at his newspaper Le XX^{e} Siècle. In 1929, with Wallez's support, Degrelle traveled to Mexico to report on the Cristero War, a rebellion of Mexican Catholics against the incumbent anti-clerical government. (Note: While in Mexico, Degrelle sent Mexican newspapers containing American comic strips back to Le XX^{e} Siècle's offices in Belgium, where the cartoonist Georges Remi (Hergé) worked for the paper. These factors led Degrelle to claim, after Hergé's death in 1983, that he was the inspiration for Tintin, Hergé's signature character. Although Hergé provided illustrations for one of Degrelle's books, the two fell out after Degrelle rushed a political poster of Hergé's design to printers without his permission.) On returning to Belgium, Degrelle dropped out of Leuven after failing to attend the exams for his doctorat de troisième cycle.

"Agitation was [Degrelle's] main characteristic as a student, then as a politician, journalist, and writer. His favorite themes were part of a global tendency in the 1930s: the fight against the corrupt established system, against parliamentary democracy supposedly infiltrated by Freemasons and the Jews."

— Dominique Trimbur, historian

In October 1930, Degrelle was asked by the ACJB to take over the management of Christus Rex, a small Catholic publishing house named after the popular youth cult of Christ the King. He accepted, staffed it with young radical Catholic students, started publishing mass-circulation magazines, and, having achieved success with these magazines, expanded its catalog with new periodicals over the next three years. In the same period, he popularized a pair of Marian apparitions at Banneux and Beauraing. He produced leaflets and posters for the Catholic Party ahead of the 1932 election, earning Christus Rex and Degrelle many conservative allies. From January 1931, with Picard's support as chair of the board of directors, Degrelle and his father purchased controlling stakes in the business. Léon assumed total control of Christus Rex by 1933 and used the platform to attack the leadership of the Catholic Party.

After the 1932 election, Degrelle began to refer to Christus Rex as a nationalistic, pro-clerical political movement, which alienated the officially apolitical ACJB. In 1933, the Catholic Party cut its ties with Degrelle, as did the ACJB the following year. To avoid insolvency, Degrelle downsized Christus Rex's staff and obeyed a command from the Bishop of Tournai to cancel a rally in Charleroi to avoid further clashes with the Catholic establishment. Over the interwar years, however, Belgian Catholic politics had split between that Catholic establishment and an authoritarian and radically clerical faction of urban, middle class students who viewed the Catholic Party as being weak and complacent. By 1936, Degrelle, who proved to be a charismatic speaker, had become highly influential amongst the latter group.

== Political activism and Rex, 1935–1940 ==
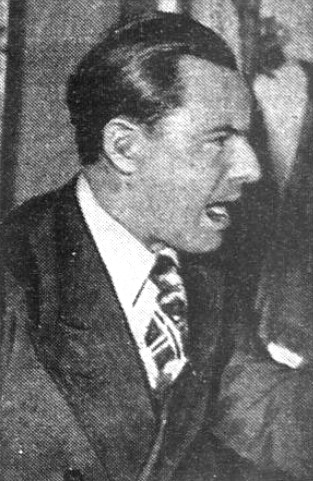
Degrelle giving a speech.

In early 1935, Degrelle morphed Christus Rex into the Rexist Party (Rex), an authoritarian, populist, and strongly clerical faction of francophone Catholic student radicals such as José Streel, Jean Denis, and Raphaël Sindic. Rex's first meeting as a political organization, modeled on Italian fascist meetings, was held on 1 May 1935. There, Degrelle declared that Rex desired to reform the Catholic Party. To that end, on 2 November 1935, in an event dubbed the Kortrijk Coup (coup de Courtrai), Degrelle and a party of Rexists interrupted a meeting of Catholic Party leaders at Kortrijk. He denounced the party leaders as corrupt and ineffective, and demanded their resignations. The party leadership responded by expelling Degrelle from the Catholic Party on 6 November, and on 20 November Cardinal Jozef-Ernest van Roey forbade the fraternization of any Catholic priest with Rex. In response, on 23 February 1936, Degrelle announced that Rex would run in the 1936 Belgian general election, the results of which would be announced on 24 May, and on 3 May launched a hastily organized newspaper, Le Pays Réel, to serve as Rex's mouthpiece.

"[Degrelle] could always command a large and enthusiastic audience, for he was a handsome young man, with dreamy but searching eyes, and a voice that could be impressively thunderous or tender when he spoke (and he almost always did) about small children and his own aged mother. He presented himself as an undaunted crusader fighting for law and order, decency and selflessness, and his attacks on party leaders who had important interests in banks and industries made a deep impression and indeed were not always without justification. After his victory in the 1936 election followed by defeat the next year, he became more overtly national socialist, introducing the theme of anti-Semitism and advocating dictatorship."

— E. H. Kossmann, historian

Rex, which ran on a populist, middle-class, and anti-democratic platform that united several right-wing elements such as anti-communists and war veterans, won 11.5 per cent of the votes cast and 21 of the 202 seats in the Chamber of Representatives. This was a ringing defeat of the Catholic Party, which lost much of its previous constituency to Rex in the form of protest votes. Degrelle sought to capitalize on Rex's victory by establishing a party bureaucracy and holding rallies. He also continued to attack the "rotten ones" (pourris) whom he alleged dominated Belgium's political and economic establishment. At the prompting of the dissident Catholic politician Gustave Sap, Degrelle publicly revealed a series of what he termed "politico-financial scandals" (scandales politico-financières), apparently demonstrating collusion between "high finance" and the incumbent government of the former banker Paul Van Zeeland.

Following the election, Degrelle formed alliances with far-right francophone Belgian groups, then traveled to Italy to meet representatives of the Italian National Fascist Party and received subsidies from them. On 26 September 1936, he met with Joseph Goebbels and Adolf Hitler in Germany to establish relations with the Nazi Party. In October, Degrelle returned to Belgium, met secretly with the Flemish National League (Vlaamsch Nationaal Verbond, VNV), a Flemish nationalist political party, and agreed to collaborate in the formation of a corporatist state with an autonomous Flanders. He then announced a march of Rexists on the capital, Brussels, for 25 October, inspired by Mussolini's 1922 March on Rome. The government banned the demonstration on 22 October and, with the erosion of Rex's alliances and image caused by their meetings with the VNV and the Nazis, the march fizzled.

In March 1937, Alfred Olivier, who had been among the Rexists elected to the Chamber of Representatives, resigned with his staff. Degrelle ran in the snap election in Brussels to determine his replacement, hoping to spark a chain of by-elections until he could force King Leopold III to call for another general election. The rhetoric and aftermath of the 1936 campaign had, however, inspired Belgian politics to form a united front against Rex to defend democracy. In the election, held on 11 April 1937, Van Zeeland personally ran against Degrelle as the candidate of the governing center-left coalition and defeated him with 76 per cent of the votes cast. Degrelle's momentum was decisively broken, and though he provoked Van Zeeland's resignation in October 1937 after accusing him of receiving financial support from the National Bank of Belgium, Rex's membership withered and its fortunes at the polls continued to decline; in the 1939 general election, Rex received only 4.4 per cent of the popular vote. As the 1930s drew to a close, Rex rapidly transformed into a fascist movement and included increasingly antisemitic rhetoric in its publications.

== War and German occupation, 1940–1945 ==
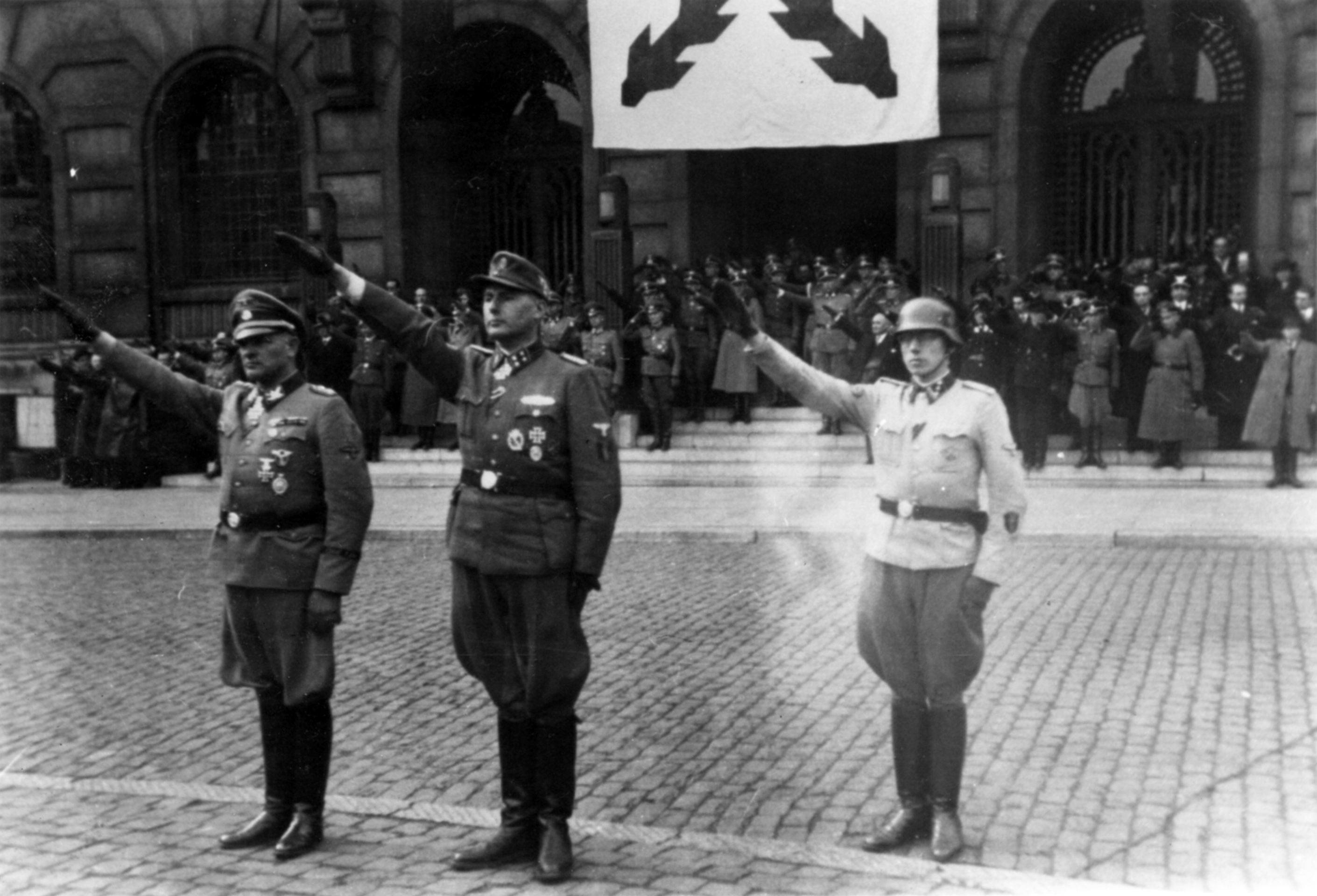
Degrelle during the Brigade parade in Charleroi following its return from Cherkassy, Soviet Union

At the outbreak of World War II in September 1939, Belgium declared its neutrality, which Rex vociferously supported. Degrelle additionally blamed the war on Britain, France, and "the occult forces of Freemasonry and the Jewish finance", precipitating a further decay of Rex's membership and reputation. In January 1940, Degrelle secretly and unsuccessfully requested German funding for a new, pro-neutrality newspaper. Amid the German invasion of Belgium on 10 May 1940, Degrelle was detained by the Belgian government, as were other Rexist leaders not enlisted in the Belgian Army such as Victor Matthys and Serge Doring.

Degrelle was first imprisoned in Bruges, then was transferred to French custody on 15 May 1940 and interrogated at Dunkirk, and then moved to the Camp Vernet internment camp in southern France as the military situation deteriorated amid the Battle of France. Leopold III surrendered at the head of the Belgian Army on 28 May and became a prisoner of war, while France sought an armistice a month later. In German-occupied Belgium, Degrelle was assumed to have been executed. On 22 July, Rexist journalist Pierre Daye discovered Degrelle in Carcassonne with the assistance of Otto Abetz, a German diplomat Degrelle had met in 1936. Daye and Degrelle arrived in Paris on 25 July and were invited to dinner with Abetz, with whom Degrelle spoke at length about expanding Belgium at the expense of France and the Netherlands.

=== Return to German-occupied Belgium ===
Degrelle returned to Brussels on 30 July 1940, and found that Belgium had been placed under a military administration and that Rex had been reorganized and had formed a militia known as the Combat Formations (Formations de Combat). Degrelle began reasserting his leadership, attempting to establish contact with German leadership through Abetz, and adopting facets of Nazi ideology. In early August, Degrelle returned to Paris to meet on 10 or 11 August with Abetz, now the ambassador to France in Paris, and to attempt to convince him of the validity of his territorial designs with the aid of maps of the Duchy of Burgundy. Also at the meeting, however, was Henri de Man, president of the Belgian Labor Party and one of Leopold III's advisors, as Abetz desired an alliance between Degrelle and de Man. They agreed to a pact and met again on 18 August in Brussels to sign an official agreement, sketching out the possible political future of Belgium as a state with no parties and an all-powerful royal government.

On his return to Brussels, Degrelle met with Belgian notables such as Robert Capelle, Leopold III's secretary, Albert Devèze, a former minister, and Maurice Lippens at his residence on the Drève de Lorraine. He came to no agreement with any of these men, however, and thus could not form a government. This required the support of Leopold III, who disliked Degrelle, and of the Germans, who were unwilling to delegate any power to Rex, and had orders from Goebbels to ignore Degrelle. Leopold III refused to meet with Degrelle or consider him for the office of Prime Minister, and summons to meet with Nazi leadership promised by Abetz were not forthcoming. Degrelle also failed to gain support for a government under his leadership from the Belgian Catholic Church.

With his other ventures flagging, Degrelle returned to attempting to gain power through popular support. He relaunched Le Pays Réel on 25 August and attempted to transform Rex into a mass movement, beginning with a tour of the country in September and the appointment of Doring and newcomers Félix Francq, Rutger Simoens, and Fernand Rouleau to positions of leadership. The revitalized Le Pays Réel achieved some success over late 1940, dramatically expanding the Combat Formations, which began attacking Jewish-owned businesses and engaging in street violence to weaken local governments. Rex remained, however, a minor entity and the disturbances caused by its street violence further angered the German military government, who were collaborating with the Belgian establishment. The Germans ordered the Rexist violence to cease and Rexist leaders complied by the end of 1940.

=== Rex's embrace of collaborationism ===
By 1941, Belgian leaders including Degrelle had realized that the war would be long and that while it was ongoing, the Germans would not delegate any power to the Belgians. Degrelle became increasingly and publicly pro-Nazi until, on 1 January 1941, in Le Pays Réel, and in a speech on 6 January, Degrelle declared his support for the German occupation of Belgium. This new orientation was unpopular within Rex, whose members came to be seen as traitors by most Belgians, and sparked another exodus of disillusioned members.

Following the January declaration, the German military administration of General Alexander von Falkenhausen remained unimpressed by Degrelle but began subsidizing Rex, appointed members to civil office, and allowed it to freely organize. In February, it also decided to seek Belgian enlistees in the National Socialist Motor Corps (Nationalsozialistisches Kraftfahrkorps, NSKK). Degrelle, who had petitioned the military administration for Rexist units in the German armed forces over late 1940, began to recruit Walloons for a Rexist brigade in the NSKK. He promised 1,000 drivers, but only recruited 300. At the same time, Degrelle began courting members of the working class and socialist leaders via Le Pays Réel to replenish Rex's membership, but again achieved little.

By April, Rex was collapsing from a combination of resignations, defections, popular and sometimes violent hostility from other Belgians, and German indifference. When the military administration appointed new, collaborationist civil servants and officials on 1 April, no Rexists were appointed. In response, Degrelle attacked the military administration in Le Pays Réel and was subsequently chastised in person by Eggert Reeder, the head of civil affairs in the military administration. On 10 April, Degrelle wrote to Hitler to request, without success, permission to enlist in the German military. On 10 May, the VNV, who were favored by the military administration and by Nazi ideology, was ceded Rex's Flemish branch in an agreement that also established Rex and the VNV as the only legitimate parties in German-occupied Belgium. No top-level Rexist leaders, however, were consulted—Rex's Flanders branch had acted independently—and Rex was not given the option of refusing the merger. This opened a rift between Rex and more moderate francophone collaborators, who attacked Rex and Degrelle as being impotent and began forming rival parties. The Germans ignored those rivals, but Rex continued to stagnate over May.

=== Barbarossa and the Walloon Legion ===
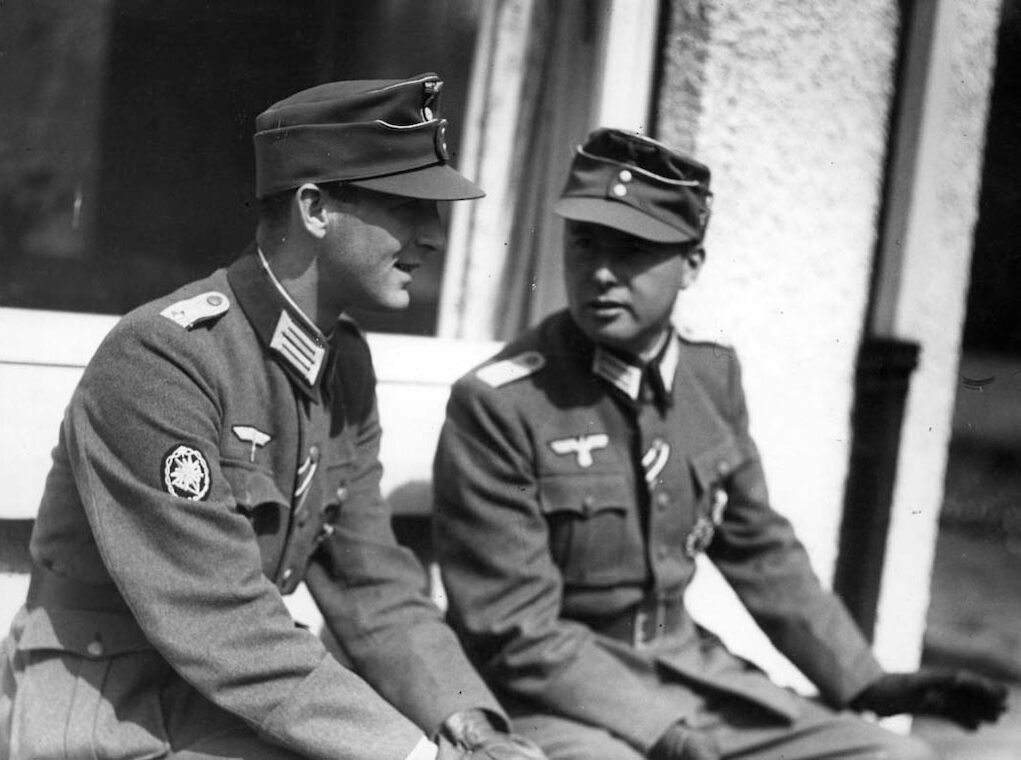
Degrelle (r.) at the Eastern Front

On 22 June 1941, Germany launched an invasion of the Soviet Union. Degrelle joined other prominent Rexists in announcing his support of the invasion, which he hoped would stem Rex's decline. He again went to meet with Abetz in Paris. In his absence, Rouleau unsuccessfully requested permission from the military administration to organize volunteer units for the Eastern Front. When Degrelle returned from France, he repeated the request. Likely because of instructions from Berlin, the military administration granted Rex permission to form a unit of francophone Belgian volunteers. As the Nazis considered Walloons an inferior people to the Flemish, Walloon and Flemish volunteers would be segregated into different units. Walloons would also only be able to enlist in the regular armed forces.

Degrelle announced the permission to organize a volunteer unit at a meeting of the Combat Formations on 6 July and exhorted Rexists to join. Claiming to have Leopold III's support, Degrelle began energetically promoting and organizing his "Walloon Legion" but achieved little. To bolster this venture, Degrelle announced on 20 July that he would enlist as a foot soldier, and gave leadership of Rex to Matthys. As a result, the Walloon Legion ballooned to 850 or 860 volunteers, 730 of whom were Rexists. The force departed Belgium for basic training on 8 August, taking with it much of Rex's provincial leadership. By this time, Degrelle had decided that the Legion was a better political vehicle than Rex, and strove to totally control it. In August, believing Rouleau to be plotting to wrest control of the Legion and then Rex from him, Degrelle ousted him from both.

Beginning in November 1941, the Legion was assigned to anti-partisan operations in occupied Soviet territory. In February 1942 it was attached to the 100th Jäger Division and moved to the frontline, where it engaged in combat with regular Soviet forces for the first time on 28 February. By the end of 1942, the Legion was reduced by attrition to 150 men and would have to rely on new recruitment drives to sustain itself. The Legion's battlefield performance was of great value to Degrelle, who came to be appreciated by German officers. In May, he was made an officer and awarded the Iron Cross, First Class, for his conduct in battle.

=== Overtures to the SS ===
As early as September 1941, Degrelle had taken an interest in the Schutzstaffel (SS), a paramilitary wing of the Nazi Party led by Heinrich Himmler, and came to see the SS as the most powerful force in Nazi-occupied Europe. In 1942, Degrelle began lobbying for the integration of Walloons into the SS, and in June made a brief visit to Berlin to meet with Nazi functionaries and Rex's interim leaders. Degrelle did not meet any SS leaders during that trip, but after returning to the front from this meeting, the Walloon Legion was briefly assigned to the command of Waffen-SS general Felix Steiner. Degrelle met Gottlob Berger, head of the SS Main Office, on 19 December. Himmler also personally warmed to Degrelle, and by the end of the year he was persuaded to name the Walloons a Germanic people.

On 17 January 1943, Degrelle gave a speech at an assembly of Rexists in Brussels in which he declared that Walloons were a Germanic people forced to adopt the French language. He proclaimed a new, "Burgundian" nationalism within a pan-German state. Following the speech, Streel and much of Rex's old guard left the party, Walloon competitors to Rex for German favor evaporated, and Degrelle definitively turned his attentions away from Rex and towards the SS. Over the rest of January and February 1943, Degrelle met with Nazi functionaries in Brussels, Berlin, and Paris to gain influence in the Nazi Party.

=== Incorporation in the Waffen-SS ===
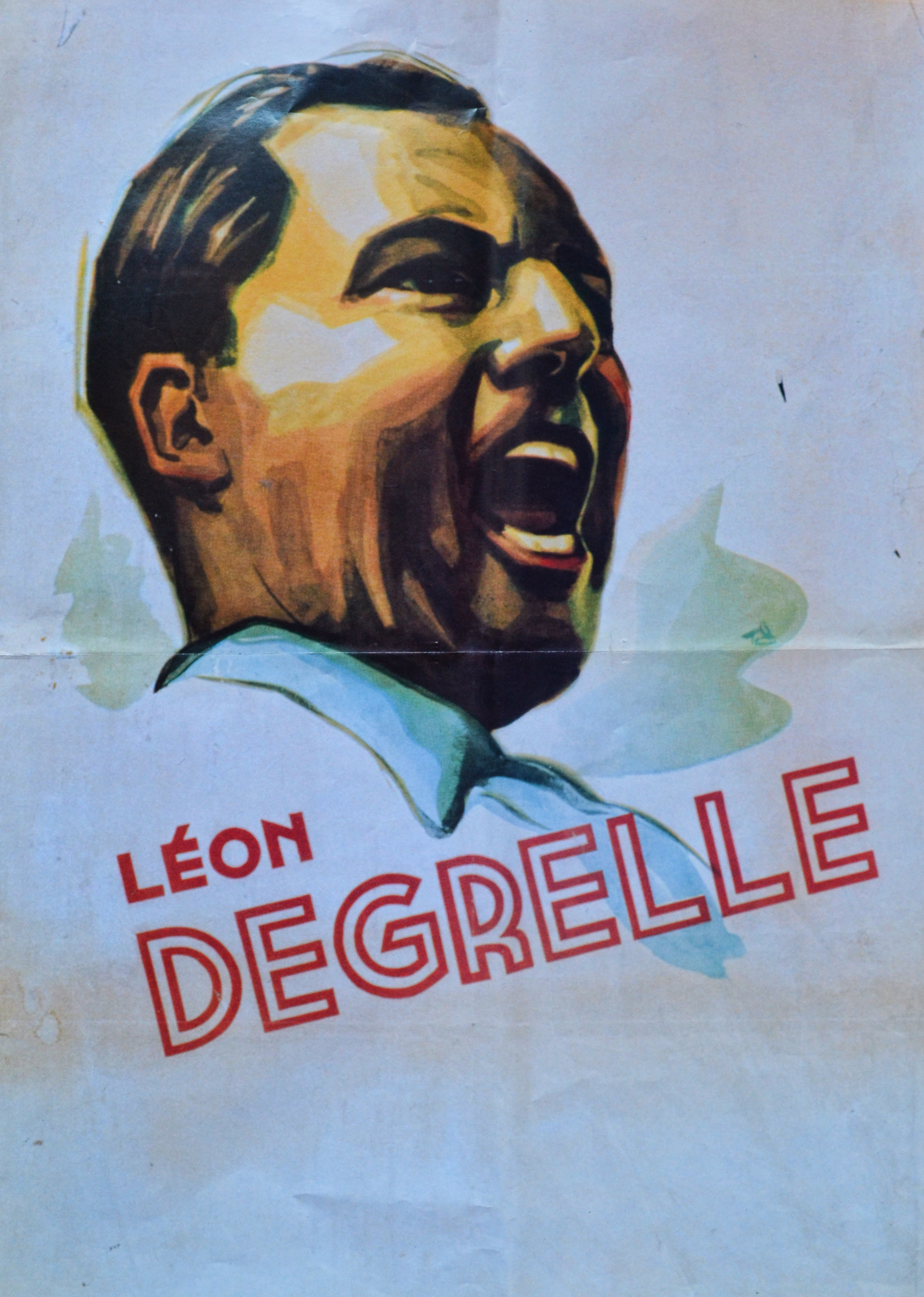
Propaganda poster of the SS Volunteer Grenadier Division Wallonia, featuring Degrelle's likeness.

On 23–24 May 1943, Degrelle met with Himmler near Rastenburg (Kętrzyn) to discuss the transfer of the Walloon Legion from the German Army to the Waffen-SS. On 1 June 1943, the Legion was integrated into the Waffen-SS as the SS-Sturmbrigade Wallonien. Degrelle spent the rest of mid-1943 enriching himself and his family with assets seized by the Germans in Belgium and France, and recruiting for the Legion. He purchased a seized Jewish-owned perfume company, and on 29 July 1943 launched a newspaper named L'Avenir that, devoid of the sensational tone and polemics of Le Pays Réel, found immediate financial success. Also in July, Degrelle attended Mass in his hometown in SS uniform and was refused the sacraments per standing orders from the Belgian bishops. In response, Degrelle and his bodyguards apprehended the offending priest and imprisoned him in Degrelle's home, provoking his excommunication by the Bishop of Namur on 19 August 1943. Degrelle successfully appealed to the Legion's chaplain and the German military chaplain service to have his excommunication overturned.

In October and again in November, Degrelle met with Berger, and at his direction wrote to Hitler to denounce the military administration in Belgium and request an SS-run government, only a few days after sending a letter of praise to Reeder. Reeder was made aware of the letter to Hitler and wrote to German field marshal Wilhelm Keitel, then the commander of the regular German armed forces, to denounce Degrelle. Degrelle rejoined the Legion on 2 November, and nine days later arrived in Ukraine with the unit, now numbering about 2,000 men. On 28 January 1944, the Legion was trapped by the Red Army in the Cherkassy pocket. The Legion was savaged in the subsequent fighting, being reduced to 632 men by the time the encirclement was broken in mid-February. Among the casualties were the Legion's commanding officer, Lucien Lippert, who was killed, and Degrelle himself, who had been injured. Degrelle was promoted to the rank of SS-Sturmbannführer (Major) to replace Lippert, but effective control of the Legion was given to another German SS officer.

Degrelle was flown to Berlin and became, according to historian Nico Wouters, "the poster boy for all European collaborators." On 20 February, Degrelle was awarded the Knight's Cross of the Iron Cross by Hitler. Two days later Degrelle was sent to Brussels to recuperate and was met there by Matthys and Richard Jungclaus, head of the SS in Belgium. Degrelle was received by collaborators in Brussels on 27 February and in Paris on 5 March, and on 2 April the surviving members of the Legion paraded through Charleroi. Degrelle, however, could not translate his military service into political aggrandizement, as the SS desired for him to remain an instrument of propaganda. While on leave, Degrelle tried to make connections with collaborators in Paris and Flanders without success. On 8 July, Degrelle's brother Edouard, who had had no role in Rex but was sympathetic to the party and the German occupation, was shot and killed in his pharmacy in their hometown. In response, German authorities arrested 46 men and Rexist militants murdered another pharmacist. Returning from a speaking tour in Germany, Degrelle arrived in Bouillon on 10 July to demand reprisals. He wrote to Himmler to request the retaliatory killing of 100 Belgian civilians and was ignored, but on 21 July Rexists attached to the Sicherheitspolizei murdered three hostages near Bouillon.

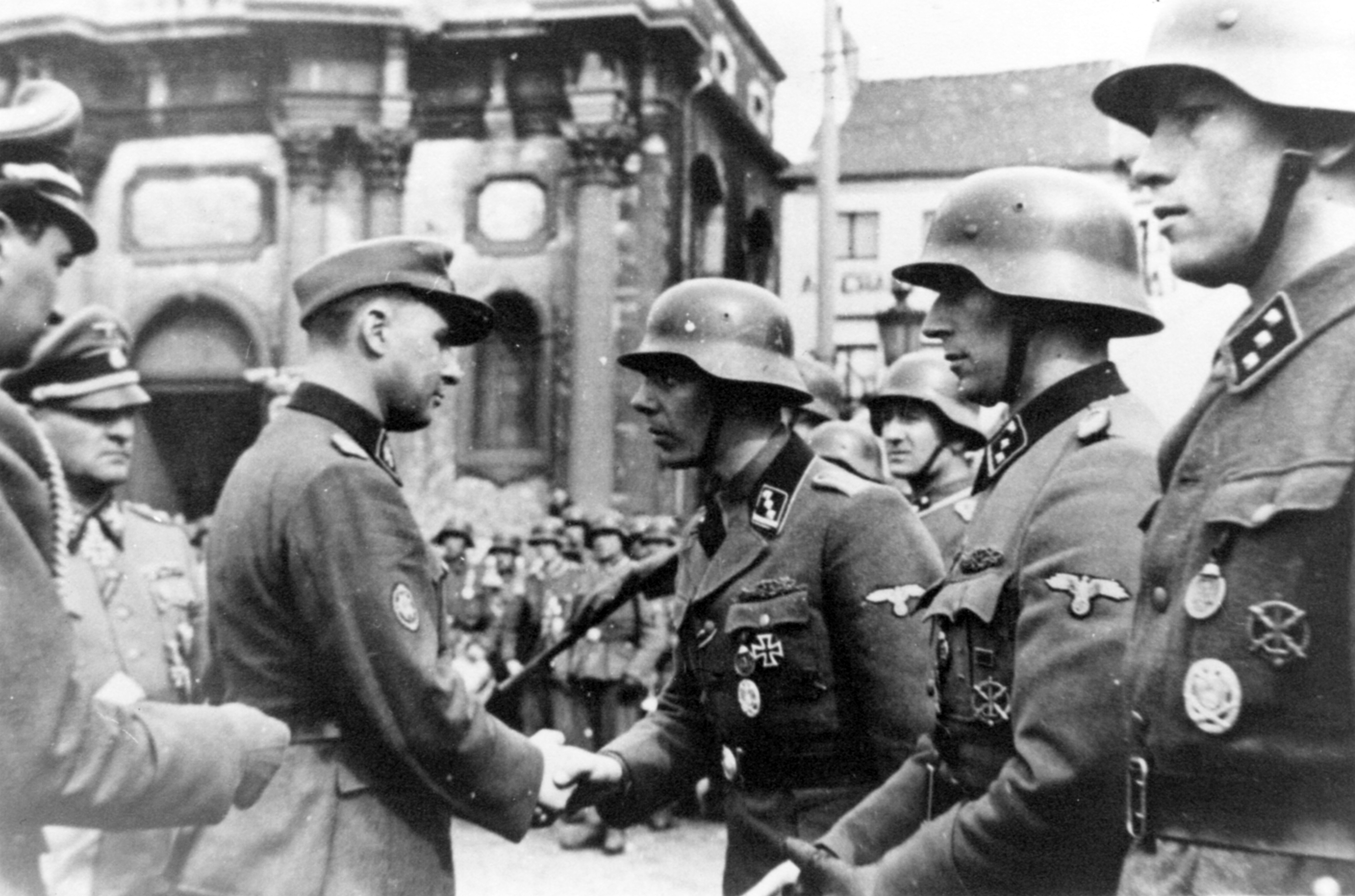
Degrelle, accompanied by Sepp Dietrich (l.), awarding a member of the Walloon Legion, Charleroi, 1 April 1944

On 22 or 23 July 1944, Degrelle returned to the Legion as it was engaged in the Battle of Narva in Estonia. The Legion was depleted by the fighting and after the battle returned to Germany, where Degrelle was awarded the Knight's Cross with Oak Leaves on 25 August. On 18 September the Legion was expanded and renamed the 28th Waffen-SS Division and placed under Degrelle's acting command. To staff the Division, Degrelle now made service in the Legion mandatory for all Rexists, many of whom were fleeing the then-ongoing liberation of Belgium, and recruited French collaborators who had fled to Sigmaringen and the Spanish volunteers of the defunct Blue Legion. In December, the Legion was assigned an armored unit, which was moved back to the front in January 1945. It was destroyed in battle by the Red Army at the Battle of the Oder–Neisse in April.

== Exile in Spain, 1945–1994 ==
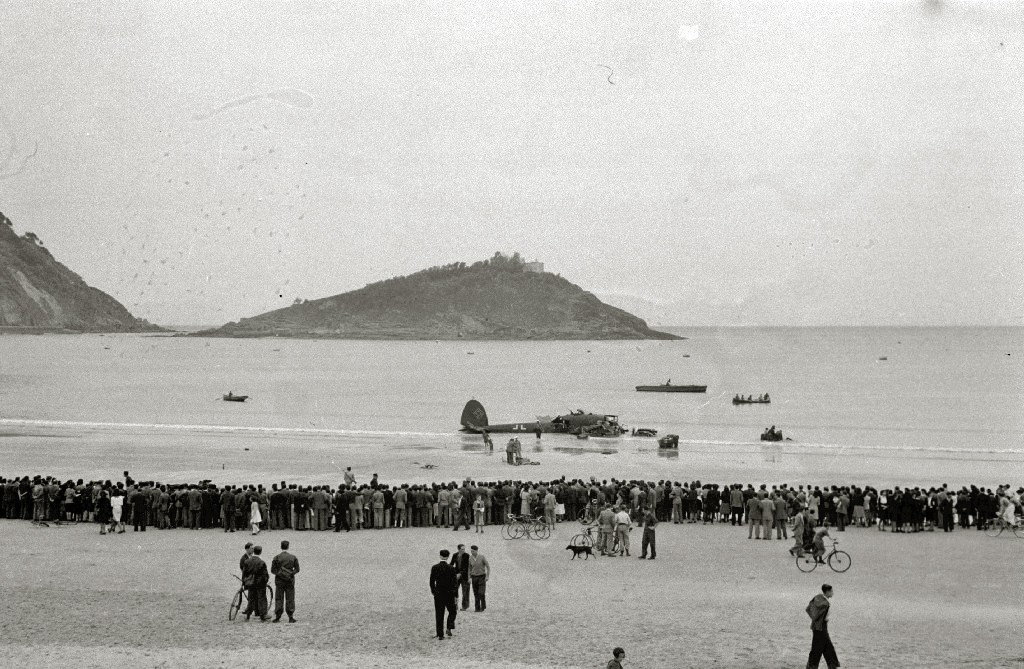
The wreckage of the Heinkel He 111 in which Degrelle escaped to Spain, May 1945

On 8 December 1944, Foreign Minister Joachim von Ribbentrop appointed Degrelle as the "Head of the Walloon Liberation Committee". Degrelle arrived at the Western Front on 1 January 1945 with a staff of 55. The offensive was a failure, and Degrelle began to plan for an Allied victory. On 30 March, he met with Matthys and Louis Collard, another Rexist leader, and dissolved Rex. In late April, Degrelle abandoned the remains of the Legion near Berlin and headed north. On 2 May, he encountered Himmler near Lübeck and attempted to gain a guarantee of safety for his family from Himmler. He was instead promoted to Oberführer. Degrelle boarded a German naval vessel bound for occupied Norway where, on 7 May, the day of Norway's liberation, Josef Terboven, former Reichskommissar of Norway, arranged for Degrelle an Heinkel He 111 which he boarded with five others bound for Francoist Spain and then South America. The next day, the plane crashed on the Beach of La Concha, at San Sebastián, Spain. Degrelle, who had amongst other injuries sustained a broken leg, was hospitalized and detained.

On 15 May, the Spanish government contacted the British government about deporting Degrelle, but not back to Belgium. In response, Belgium, which made Degrelle's repatriation and prosecution a top priority, asked for British and American support in talks with Spain. The United States and the UK were ambivalent about the matter as Degrelle had not been named a war criminal by the United Nations War Crimes Commission, but were moved into an active role in June by Belgian protests. The British and Americans decided that, since Degrelle had entered Spain as a member of the German armed forces, he should be taken into Allied custody with 30 other German exiles via an American ship, and communicated this desire to Spain. The Spanish government decided it could not extract diplomatic recognition from Belgium in exchange for Degrelle, and instead justified its reluctance to repatriate Degrelle on human rights grounds. On the night of 21–22 August 1946, Degrelle disappeared from the hospital in which he was recuperating. The Spanish government announced that he had left the country and that his location was unknown, and promised to repatriate Degrelle to Belgium if he returned.

The Belgian government had sentenced Degrelle to death in absentia in 1944 and revoked his citizenship on 29 December 1945. With the assistance of the Spanish government, Degrelle went into hiding in the southern Spanish Province of Málaga and was kept informed about Belgian agents posing as tourists visiting the region to locate him. In 1954, Degrelle was adopted by a local woman he had befriended, Matilde Ramírez Reina, and thereby gained Spanish citizenship under the name José León Ramírez Reina. Degrelle made his first public appearance since the war on 15 December 1954 at a ceremony held to honor Spanish volunteers in the German military. This, and a letter Degrelle wrote to the Belgian newspaper La Libre Belgique offering to stand trial in Belgium if the trial was publicized, provoked a diplomatic breach between Spain and Belgium.

By the 1960s, the Belgian government was content with Degrelle remaining in exile in Spain as long as he remained unprovocative. Degrelle became an increasingly public figure in the 1960s and was frequently discussed by French and Belgian media. He openly associated with other Nazi exiles such as Otto Skorzeny, and wore his SS uniform to his daughter's wedding in 1969, an event reported widely in the Spanish press. On 3 December 1964, Belgium passed a law, named the Lex Degrelliana, that extended the statute of limitations for death sentences issued for offenses against the Belgian state committed between 1940 and 1945 from 20 years to 30. In 1969, Degrelle began a media campaign to be allowed to return to Belgium. At Belgium's request, an arrest warrant for Degrelle was filed the next year by Spanish police but not served, putting an end to the campaign. By the 1980s, Degrelle was living comfortably, having profited from running a construction company that helped build American airbases in Spain, and under his original name. On 31 March 1994, Degrelle died of cardiac arrest in a hospital in Málaga. Belgium definitively blocked Degrelle's return in 1983 and subsequently forbade the repatriation of his remains.

=== Holocaust denial and lawsuit ===
After World War II, Degrelle joined other Nazi exiles in denying the Holocaust. In 1979, ahead of Pope John Paul II's visit to the Auschwitz concentration camp, Degrelle wrote an open letter to the Pope. In the letter, Degrelle denied that any systematic killing had taken place at Auschwitz and that the "real genocide" was the American atomic bombings of Hiroshima and Nagasaki and the bombings of Hamburg and Dresden.

In its July–August 1985 issue, the Spanish magazine Tiempo published an interview with Degrelle in which he repeated his skepticism about the Holocaust, and claimed that Josef Mengele, an SS officer stationed at Auschwitz, was an ordinary doctor and that no gas chambers existed at Auschwitz. Violeta Friedman, a survivor of Auschwitz whose family had been gassed on Mengele's orders, decided to sue Degrelle and Tiempo. In August, Friedman was introduced by Jewish community leaders Max Mazín and Alberto Benasuly to Catalan lawyer Jorge Trías for legal counsel and was assured of the support of Israel's then-ambassador to Spain, Shlomo Ben Ami.

The lawsuit went to court in Madrid on 7 November 1985 and was based on the Ley Orgánica 1/82 of 5 May 1982 and the Ley 62/78 of 26 December 1978, protecting the same rights, as Trías realized that it was not possible to sue Degrelle for making his statements under any of the articles of the Spanish Criminal Code which were in force at the time. Friedman and her lawyer thus alleged that Degrelle's statements had sullied the honor of her family as victims of the Holocaust, which Degrelle's lawyer dismissed by stating that Friedman lacked standing as Degrelle had not mentioned her or her family, and motioned for the case to be dismissed. The lower courts were initially favorable to Degrelle, but in 1991 the Supreme Court of Spain ruled in favor of the plaintiff. The court determined that Friedman had standing to sue Degrelle because his statements were not protected by the freedom of expression guaranteed by the Constitution of Spain. According to Trías, the case influenced Spanish law about genocide denial, racism, and xenophobia.

== Personal life ==
Degrelle married Marie Lemay, the daughter of a French industrialist, on 27 March 1932. The couple had five children. Their marriage became strained during the war as Degrelle kept mistresses in Brussels and Paris, and Lemay had an open affair with an officer of the Luftwaffe until she ended the affair in March 1943 and informed Degrelle of it. The officer, unwilling to end the affair, was found shot in the head and heart near the Degrelle residence on 12 April 1943. Degrelle was cleared of any wrongdoing by Nazi authorities and news of the officer's death was suppressed. Lemay was imprisoned by Belgian authorities and chose not to join Degrelle in Spain. She died in Nice on 29 January 1984. On 15 June 1984, Degrelle married Jeanne Brevet Charbonneau, niece of Joseph Darnand, former commander of the Vichy French paramilitary Milice.

== Legacy ==
Degrelle had a great influence in the post-war resurgence of fascism. Beginning in 1949, Degrelle began to publish books and give interviews in which he praised the Nazis, denied the Holocaust, attempted to distort the historical record, and aggrandize himself. Degrelle's work formed a large amount of the 20th century, French-language historiography of Belgium during the war until it was refuted by Belgian historian Albert de Jonghe in the 1970s. Degrelle was also influential among post-war far-right groups in Belgium and West Germany, especially in the 1980s and 1990s. In the 2010s, Italian journalist Alessandro Orsini embedded himself with neo-fascist militias in Italy and reported that Degrelle's writings were required reading among them.

Degrelle's estate in Málaga became a port of call for neo-Nazis. He established connections with neo-Nazis such as the Spanish Circle of Friends of Europe (Círculo Español de Amigos de Europa, CEDADE), which networked with neo-Nazi groups throughout Europe through Degrelle and Skorzeny. In the 1960s, a portrait of Degrelle appeared in a work by Werner Haupt for the HIAG, a Waffen-SS veterans' lobbyist group. He continued to make appearances in German-language, neo-Nazi publications into the 1990s. Degrelle also found friends in the post-Francoist People's Alliance (Alianza Popular, AP), and in Jean-Marie Le Pen, the founder of the far-right National Front party in France, and Michael Kühnen, a leader of the German neo-Nazi movement of the later 20th century.
