= Lucien Lippert =

Belgian soldier

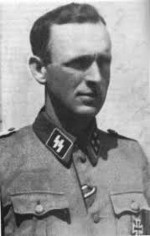
- Lippert in 1941
- Born: 25 August 1913
- Died: 13 February 1944 (aged 30) Cherkasy, Ukrainian SSR, Soviet Union
- Cause of death: Killed in Action
- Branch: Schutzstaffel
- Rank: SS-Obersturmbannführer
- Conflicts: World War II: Operation Barbarossa
- Awards: Iron Cross

Lucien Lippert was a Belgian soldier who collaborated with Nazi Germany during the Second World War. He served as the first commander of the Walloon Legion, a collaborationist military unit recruited from French-speaking Belgians, which was later incorporated into the Waffen-SS. Following its transfer, Lippert became the inaugural commander of the SS Sturmbrigade Wallonien, the first Walloon formation within the SS.

In April 1942, he was appointed commanding officer of the legion. After the unit was absorbed into the Waffen-SS and reorganised as the SS Volunteer Sturmbrigade Wallonien, Lippert was promoted in June 1943 to the rank of SS-Sturmbannführer and placed in command of the newly formed brigade.

Lippert was killed in action in February 1944 near the village of Novo-Buda in central Ukraine. He was succeeded as commander by Léon Degrelle.

== Early life and career ==
Lucien Lippert was born in Arlon, in the province of Luxembourg, Belgium, in 1913. He was serving in the Belgian Army at the time of the German invasion of Belgium in May 1940. Following Belgium's occupation, Lippert became one of the earliest Belgian volunteers to join the Walloon Legion, a military formation established with German support and composed primarily of French-speaking collaborationist recruits.

== Wallon Legion ==
Lippert was among the earliest volunteers to join the Walloon Legion, a unit established in 1941 under German supervision and largely composed of French-speaking Belgian recruits, many motivated by anti-communism, Walloon nationalist sentiment, or cooperationist political networks. Unlike some other prominent collaborationist leaders, Lippert did not hold a major pre-war political role and was known primarily as a military officer rather than an ideological spokesman.

In April 1942, Lippert was appointed commanding officer' of the Walloon Legion, a position that placed him in charge of the unit's military operations and discipline as it served on the Eastern Front under Wehrmacht command. Contemporary accounts and later historical research describe him as a professional soldier focused on order and battlefield leadership, operating alongside Rexist political figure Léon Degrelle, who acted as the movement's chief recruiter and public representative but was not yet in formal military command.

He was awarded the Iron Cross 1st Class in 1942.

== Transfer to the Waffen SS ==
In 1943, the Walloon Legion was reorganised and incorporated into the Waffen-SS, becoming the SS-Freiwilligen-Sturmbrigade Wallonien (SS Volunteer Sturmbrigade Wallonien). To command the newly restructured brigade, Lippert was promoted in June 1943 to the rank of SS-Sturmbannführer (major), making him the first Walloon commander of an SS formation. Under his leadership, the brigade continued combat operations in Soviet territories, particularly in Ukraine, where it was deployed in defensive and anti-partisan operations amid increasingly difficult strategic conditions for German forces.

== Death ==
Lippert was killed in action in February 1944 near the village of Novo-Buda in central Ukraine. Following his death, command of the SS Walloon unit passed to Léon Degrelle, who later became the most well-known figure associated with Walloon SS collaboration. Lippert did not live to see the formation expanded into a full SS division later in 1944, and he left no memoirs or major personal writings, contributing to the scarcity of detailed personal documentation about his motivations or private life.

== Legacy ==
Lippert is remembered chiefly for his role as the first military commander of the Walloon SS brigade. Due to his early death and relatively low political profile, historians discuss him mainly within broader studies of Belgian and Western European collaboration or within works centred on the Rexist movement and its military units. While recognised as an important organisational and disciplinary figure in the legion's early development, his name did not achieve the post-war notoriety or mythic status that later surrounded Degrelle, and analyses of Lippert emphasise his function as a field commander rather than a leading political ideologue.
