= Miguel Ezquerra =

Spanish Falangist and volunteer in the Blue Division and Waffen-SS (1913–1984)

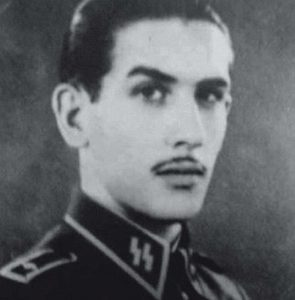
- Born: 10 January 1913; Canfranc, Spain
- Died: 29 October 1984 (aged 71); Madrid, Spain
- Military career
- Allegiance: Spain; Germany
- Branch: Spanish Armed Forces; Wehrmacht; Waffen-SS
- Service years: 1936–1939, 1941–1945
- Rank: Alférez provisional Hauptsturmführer
- Units: Blue Division; Walloon Legion; Blue Legion
- Conflicts: Spanish Civil War; World War II: Battle of Krasny Bor; Battle of Berlin

Gonzalo Miguel Ezquerra Sánchez (January 10, 1913 – October 29, 1984) was a Spanish Falangist, soldier and volunteer member of the Waffen-SS. He fought in the Spanish Civil War and in the Second World War, in a battalion of the Spanish Blue Division or 250. Infanterie-Division as it was known in the German Army.

== Biography ==
Born in Canfranc, Aragon, and the son of the town's miller, Ezquerra was a Falangist and enthusiastically signed up for military service on the Nationalist side after the military coup of 18 July 1936. He fought on the fronts of Aragon, Madrid, Extremadura and Teruel, in the 7th "Bandera de Castilla" and in the 6th Granada Infantry Regiment. He was wounded in fighting around Huesca, commissioned as a "provisional second lieutenant" (alferez provisional) and ended the war as a provisional first lieutenant. He received several medals for valor. After the end of the war he was demobilised, and worked as a provincial chief of the "Obra Sindical de Artesania" union. He married Consuelo Reinoso and they had two daughters.

On hearing the news of the outbreak of the Second World War, he immediately visited the German embassy in Madrid, offering to enlist on the German side. His enthusiastic offer was noted, but tactfully declined. Later when Spain decided to send volunteers to assist German efforts on the Eastern front, he enrolled in the Blue Division. The Blue Division was ordered to the siege of Leningrad where it would eventually participate in the Battle of Krasny Bor.

Later, after the Blue Division had been repatriated to Spain on April 2, 1944, he was determined to continue to fight. He secretly crossed the French border in April 1944 to enlist in the Wehrmacht, and he was eventually transferred into the Waffen-SS.

As part of the 11th SS Panzergrenadier Division "Nordland", and with the rank of Hauptsturmführer, Miguel Ezquerra fought to defend the town of Stettin on the Oder River. From April–May 1945, Ezquerra was in Berlin leading three companies of Spanish volunteers defending the city from advancing Soviet troops. Ezquerra had linked up with remnants of the Charlemagne Division and Volkssturm volunteers and fought in the central Reichstag district, being among the last defenders of the bunker of Adolf Hitler. He was briefly captured by Soviet troops but was released and after various misadventures across Western Europe, where he passed himself off as an Argentine citizen, Ezquerra returned to Spain.

Miguel Ezquerra was author of the book Berlín, a vida o muerte ("Berlin, to life or death"). Little is known about his later life. It is generally agreed that he was one of the most notable Spanish combatants in the Second World War. It has been alleged that he received several decorations and awards, including the Knight's Cross of the Iron Cross and had German nationality granted to him personally by Hitler but there is no hard evidence to those claims. (Cfr. Interview Review N. 339, Madrid, November 1982).

Some historians, such as Kenneth W. Estes, question the assertions made by Ezquerra himself, as no evidence has ever been found to corroborate his claims about the role he played. While no one denies he was present in Germany and that there was a unit of some sort bearing his name, his real rank and participation in some events can be questioned.

Ezquerra, for example, claims to have been promoted from Lieutenant to Lieutenant-Colonel, orally, between his 1944 arrival in Stablack and final combat in Berlin. During this time, he allegedly served in the Army's special operations unit, the "Brandenburgers," first fighting Maquis in and out of Paris, and then with his Spanish commando unit, fighting behind the American (!) lines in the Battle of the Bulge. He claimed to have had personal contact with Hitler, who orally (of course) awarded him the Knight's Cross; Himmler, Goebbels, and Berger; and to have seen Martin Bormann and Axmann. In the last days of the war, his "Ezquerra Unit" — now absorbed into the Waffen-SS, (although all his oral promotions had come from Army officers) consisted of three companies of Spaniards, some "Doriot Milice" [sic] and more Spaniards from the Walloon Division.

Since 1995, the remains of Ezquerra have rested next to those of his comrades in the Vault of the Blue Division, in cemetery of the Almudena (3rd Plateau, area A) at Madrid.

== Sources (in Spanish) ==
- Ezquerra, Miguel, Berlín, a vida o muerte. Ed. García Hipan. Granada, 1999.
- Nart, Javier, El jefe español de las SS en Interviu Review, 10-16 de Noviembre de 1982.
- Recio Cardona, Ricardo, Españoles en la Segunda Guerra Mundial (El frente del este). Ed. Vandalia. Madrid, 1999.
- Garcia, Mariano, Un Aragones en el Bunker de Hitler, El Heraldo, 19 de Junio, 2011.
