= Vonêche Castle =

Castle in Vonêche, Belgium

Coordinates: 50.057°N 4.980°E

Vonêche Castle was built in 1806 by Aimé Gabriel d’Artigues who was the owner of a crystal factory in Vonêche, Belgium.

== See also ==
- List of castles in Belgium
