= Our Lady of Beauraing =

1932–33 Marian apparitions in Belgium

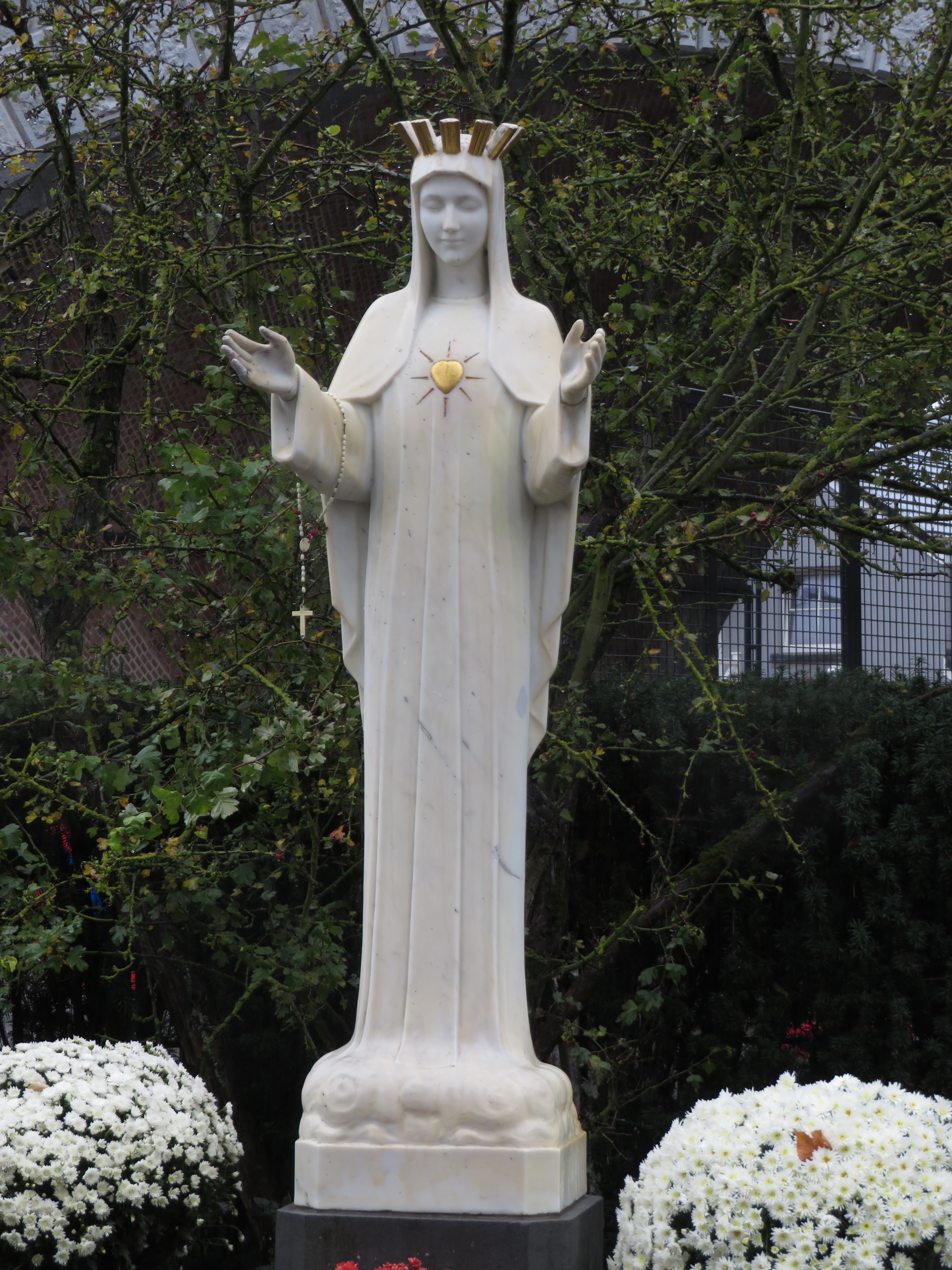
- Statue of the Virgin of the Golden Heart.
- Location: Beauraing, Belgium
- Date: 29 November 1932 – 3 January 1933
- Type: Marian apparition
- Approval: 2 July 1949; Bishop André-Marie Charue; Diocese of Namur

Our Lady of Beauraing (French: Notre-Dame de Beauraing; also known as Our Lady of the Golden Heart and the Virgin of the Golden Heart) is the title of 33 Marian apparitions reported in Beauraing, Belgium, between November 1932 and January 1933 by five children whose ages ranged between 9 and 15. For several years after the apparitions, pilgrims flocked to the small town of Beauraing, province of Namur (Belgium), and many cures were claimed. She is celebrated under this title on 29 November.

== Apparitions ==
The five young children who claimed to have seen the apparitions were Fernande (15), Gilberte (13), and Albert (11) Voisin, children of Hector, a railway clerk, and Marie-Louise Perpète Voisin, and Andrée (14) and Gilberte (9) Degeimbre, daughters of Degeimbre, a farmer's widow.

On 29 November 1932, around 6 p.m., four of the children walked to a boarding school run by the Sisters of Christian Doctrine to meet up with Gilberte Voisin and walk home with her. Albert, who had just rung the bell at the school, turned around and exclaimed, "Look! the Virgin walking on that bridge!". The girls turned around and saw the figure of a lady dressed in white walking a meter above the railroad viaduct nearby. A nun of the convent, Sister Valéria, came to open the door and did not believe the children. The nun then went to fetch Gilberte and when she arrived at the doorstep, she too saw the vision. Frightened, the five children ran home but agreed to return the next day. The next day, 30 November, the Virgin appeared to them again above the bridge at the same time.

On 1 December, the children were this time accompanied by their parents and some friends. The widow Degeimbre, armed with a big stick, wanted to find the person who was scaring the children. The Virgin first appeared on the bridge. She then appeared near a holly tree in the convent's garden. Each time she appeared, the parents would see their children as if thrown to their knees, but they could not see the visions themselves. The Virgin then disappeared again and appeared under a hawthorn tree near the garden gate. This was where she appeared for all the thirty remaining apparitions. The Superior, Mother Theophile, wanted to put an end to the "comedy" and decided to close the gates of the garden and to let loose the convent's two dogs.

On 2 December the children returned but could no longer enter the garden, so they remained on the sidewalk in the street. The Virgin appeared to them again, facing them on the other side of the gate. The moment she appeared, the dogs stopped barking and lay on the ground. That evening, Albert asked the Virgin: "Are you the Immaculate Conception?". The Virgin smiled and nodded her head. Then he asked: "What do you want?” The Virgin spoke for the first time and answered: "Always be good". Then, in a second apparition that evening, she asked Albert: "Is it true that you will always be good?”. On 3 December, there was a crowd of 150 standing in the street.

The apparitions continued day after day and started gathering crowds. In the meantime, the Sisters had lifted their ban on visits to the garden. On 8 December, the day of the Feast of the Immaculate Conception, the crowd was even larger than usual and between 10,000 and 15,000 people were present. This time they were accompanied by a number of doctors and psychologists who performed tests on the children while they were ecstatic for over fifteen minutes. The children remained insensitive and retained no trace of the painful tests. For the first time, the bishop of Namur was told about the apparitions. He urged caution, and told the clergy not to attend the apparitions.

On 17 December, the Virgin asked for "a chapel". On 21 December, when asked "Tell us who you are", she named herself "I am the Immaculate Virgin". On 23 December, the children asked "Why do you come here?” and she replied "So that people might come here on pilgrimages".. On 29 December, the Virgin warned that she would soon stop appearing to them. That day, the Blessed Virgin opened her arms in the usual gesture of farewell and revealed a "Heart of Gold" surrounded by glittering rays on her chest. This was the vision which gave her the name of the Virgin of the Golden Heart. On 30 December she asked to "Pray, pray very much".. On 1 January, she asked to "Pray always".. On 2 January, over 12,000 people were gathered and the Virgin told the children that she will talk and deliver a secret to each of them the next day.

The day of the last apparition, on 3 January 1933, 30,000 people had gathered in front of the school. The Virgin entrusted each of the three youngest with a personal message that is still unknown. After entrusting them with these secrets, the Virgin declared to Andrée "I am the Mother of God, the Queen of Heaven. Pray always. Goodbye". Then she promised to Gilberte Voisin "I will convert sinners". Finally, she asked Fernande "Do you love my Son? Do you love me? Then sacrifice yourself...for me. Goodbye".

During the visions, the children reported that the Virgin Mary looked young, dressed in a long white dress. They said that three rays of blue azure draped the dress, obliquely, from the left shoulder to the hem. Her head was covered with a long white veil and that rays of light emerged from her head to form a crown. From 29 December onwards the children also discovered that a rosary hung from her arm and that she presented a Heart of Gold.

== Ecclesiastical review ==
In 1935, the Bishop of Namur, Thomas-Louis Heylen, appointed an Episcopal Commission to investigate the events. After his death, the work continued under his successor, Bishop André-Marie Charue.

On 7 December 1942, Bishop Charue received from the Holy See a decree approved by Pope Pius XII which authorized him to proceed toward canonical recognition. On 2 February 1943, he published a decree authorizing public devotions to Our Lady of Beauraing. On 16 May 1943, he solemnly inaugurated this devotion at a great ceremony attended by 24,000 people. The final approbation for the Marian apparition was granted on 2 July 1949 with the permission of the Holy Office. Two documents were released that day: a letter from the Bishop to the clergy of his diocese and an episcopal decree recognizing as authentic miracles two healings credited to Our Lady of Beauraing. One was the cure of Miss Van Laer of a spinal column deformation and tumors in a diseased leg on 24 June 1933, and the other one was the cure of Mrs. Acar who was cured of a tumor of the womb on 30 July 1933.

In 1949 in Lowell, Massachusetts, the Pro Maria Committee was founded by Joseph Debergh, O.M.I. to disseminate the story of Our Lady's thirty-three appearances in Beauraing. The committee created an archive of photographs of the history and activities relating to the apparitions, now housed at The Marian Library and International Marian Research Institute.

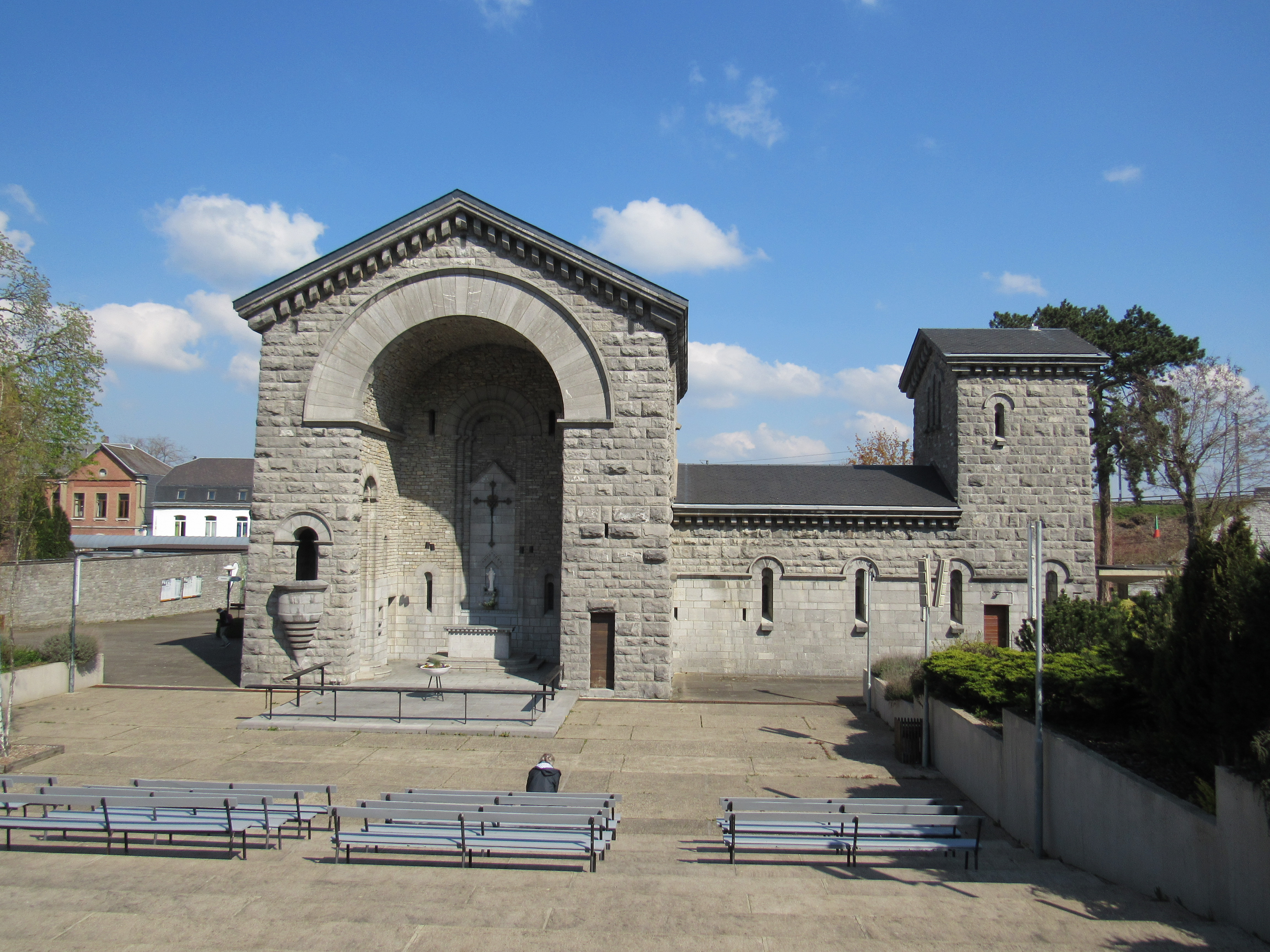
The Sanctuary of Our Lady of Beauraing in Belgium

The chapel was consecrated on 21 August 1954.

After the apparitions, the five children all grew up, married, and lived quiet lives with their families.

Pope John Paul II visited Beauraing on 18 May 1985.

== See also ==
- Our Lady of Banneux
- Visions of Jesus and Mary

== Sources ==
- Shrine of Our Lady of Beauraing
