= Honnay =

Honnay Onai (Walloon)
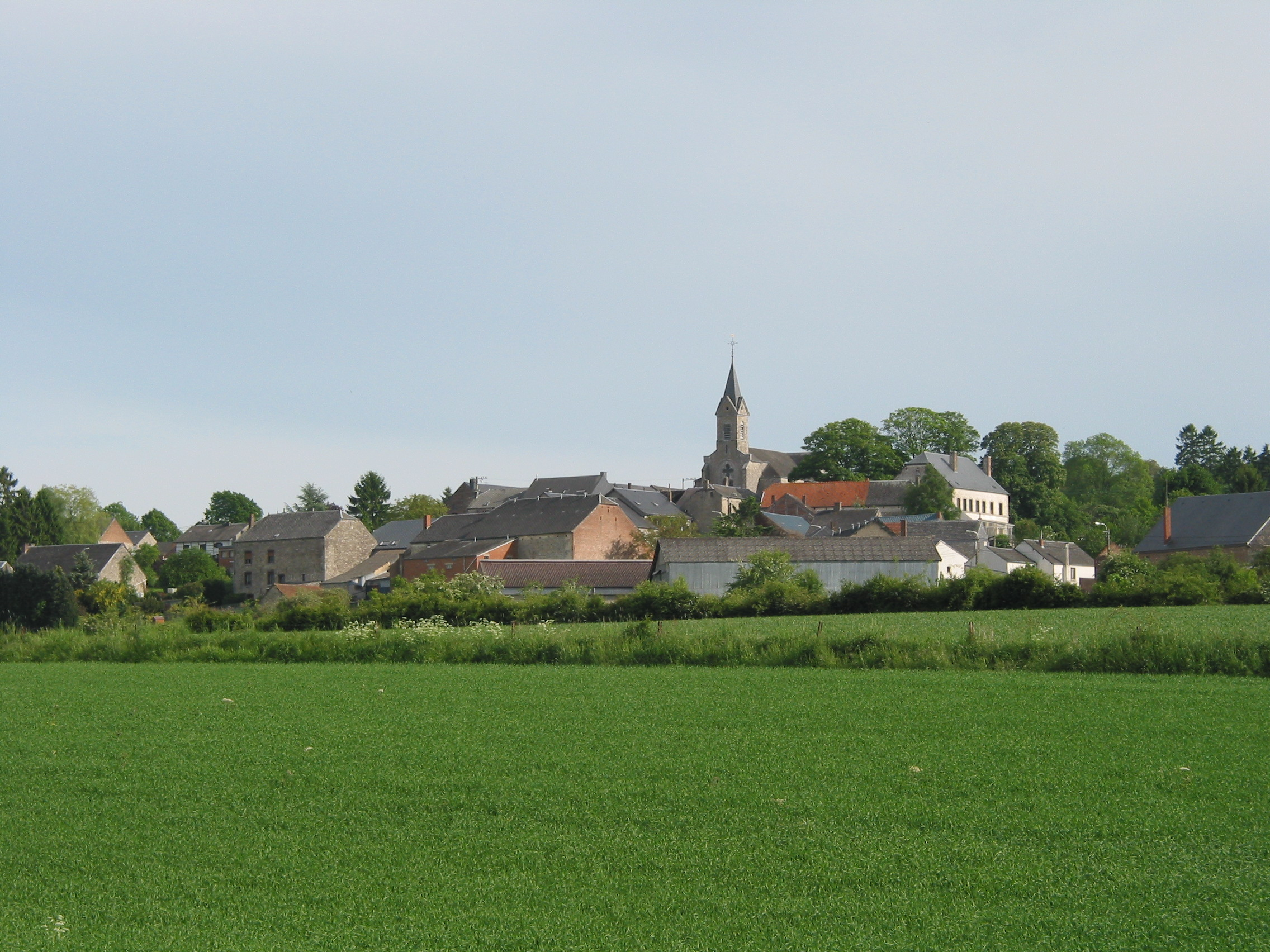
- Honnay

- Location within Belgium Location within Europe
- Coordinates: 50°04′51″N 05°02′24″E
- Country: Belgium
- Region: Wallonia
- Province: Namur
- Municipality: Beauraing

Honnay (French pronunciation: [ɔnɛ]; Walloon: Onai) is a village in Wallonia and a district of the municipality of Beauraing, located in the province of Namur, Belgium.

The village has been settled at least since Roman times. From 1115, it belonged to the Prince-Bishopric of Liège. The Neo-Romanesque village church dates from 1868. The village school was built in 1875. West of the village lies a château from the 19th century.
