= List of protected heritage sites in Beauraing =

This table shows an overview of the protected heritage sites in the Walloon town Beauraing. This list is part of Belgium's national heritage.

Object	Year/architect	Town/section	Address	Coordinates	Number^{?}	Image
Ensemble formed by the Castle Beauraing and the surrounding park ^{(nl)} ^{(fr)}		Beauraing		50.101639°N 4.947045°E	91013-CLT-0001-01 Info	
Chapel Saint-Pierre and extensions of the classification of Castle Beauraing ^{(nl)} ^{(fr)}		Beauraing		50.101229°N 4.947877°E	91013-CLT-0002-01 Info	
Gate of Lomprez ^{(nl)} ^{(fr)}		Honnay Beauraing	Rue de Focant, aan de zijde van 111 te Revogne	50.093627°N 5.046748°E	91013-CLT-0005-01 Info	
Tower of Javingue-Sevry and the main building which adjoins it ^{(nl)} ^{(fr)}		Javingue Beauraing		50.094076°N 4.927353°E	91013-CLT-0006-01 Info	Toren van Javingue-Sevry en het hoofdgebouw waaraan het grenst
Chapel of Saint-Etienne in the hamlet Revogne, and the ensemble of the building and the road in the hamlet Revogne down to the chapel and the road to here and to the north, with the ruins of the old castle ^{(nl)} ^{(fr)}		Honnay Beauraing		50.094477°N 5.045158°E	91013-CLT-0009-01 Info	
Farmhouse of Loges and the surrounding meadows ^{(nl)} ^{(fr)}		Beauraing		50.052060°N 4.934008°E	91013-CLT-0010-01 Info	
Three towers of the castle and the outer walls ^{(nl)} ^{(fr)}		Beauraing		50.106250°N 4.955825°E	91013-CLT-0012-01 Info	

== See also ==
- List of protected heritage sites in Namur (province)
- Beauraing
