= Felenne =

Felenne Felene (Walloon)
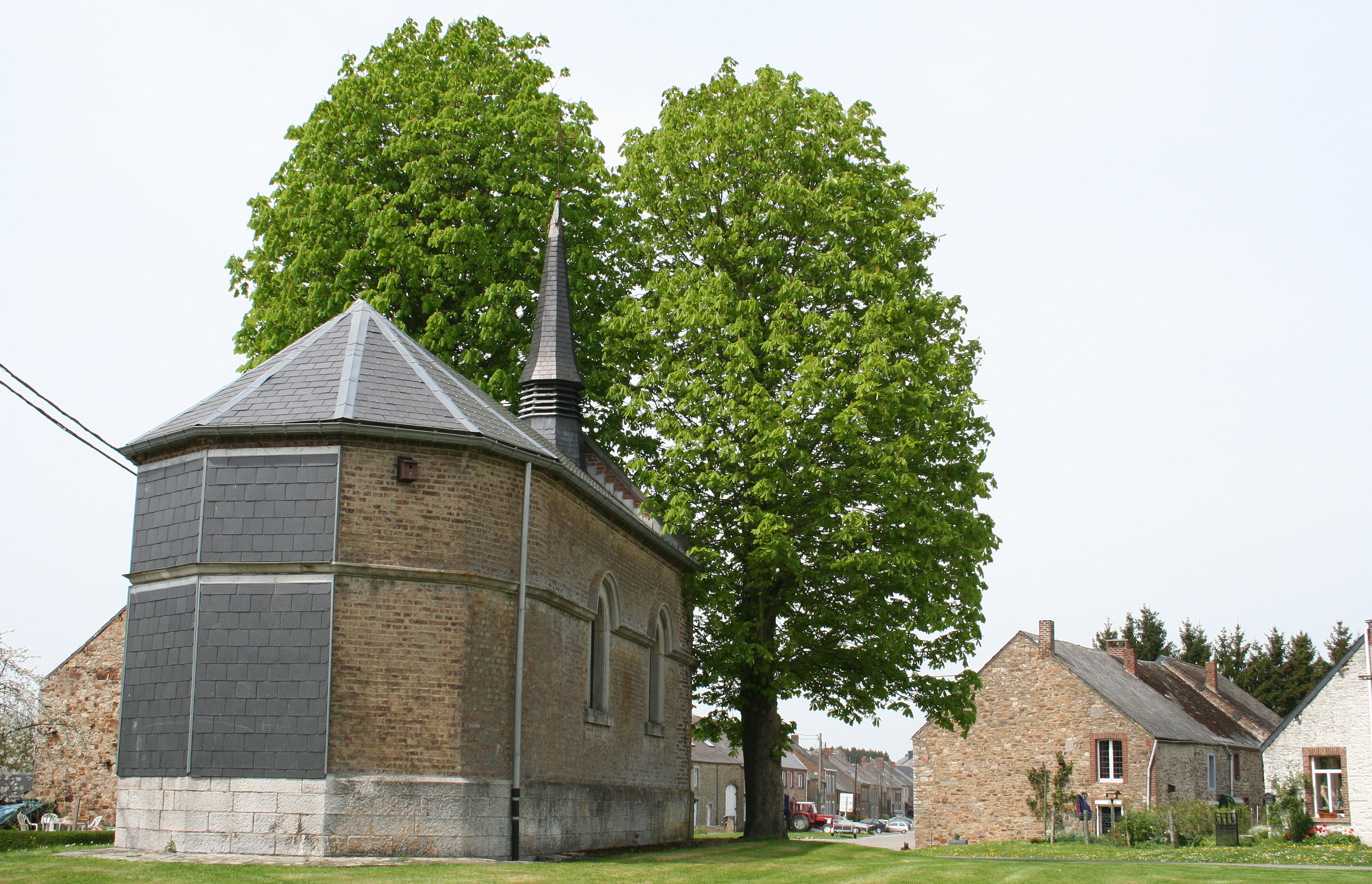
- Felenne

- Location within Belgium Location within Europe
- Coordinates: 50°04′08″N 04°50′49″E
- Country: Belgium
- Region: Wallonia
- Province: Namur
- Municipality: Beauraing

Felenne (French pronunciation: [fəlɛn]; Walloon: Felene) is a village in Wallonia and a district of the municipality of Beauraing, located in the province of Namur, Belgium.

The settlement has existed since the 11th century. Between 1678 and 1699 it was part of France. The nave of the village church is from the 18th century, while the rest of the church dates from 1840. The oldest parts of the mill of the village date from the 18th century.
