= Froidfontaine =

Froidfontaine Froedfontinne (Walloon)
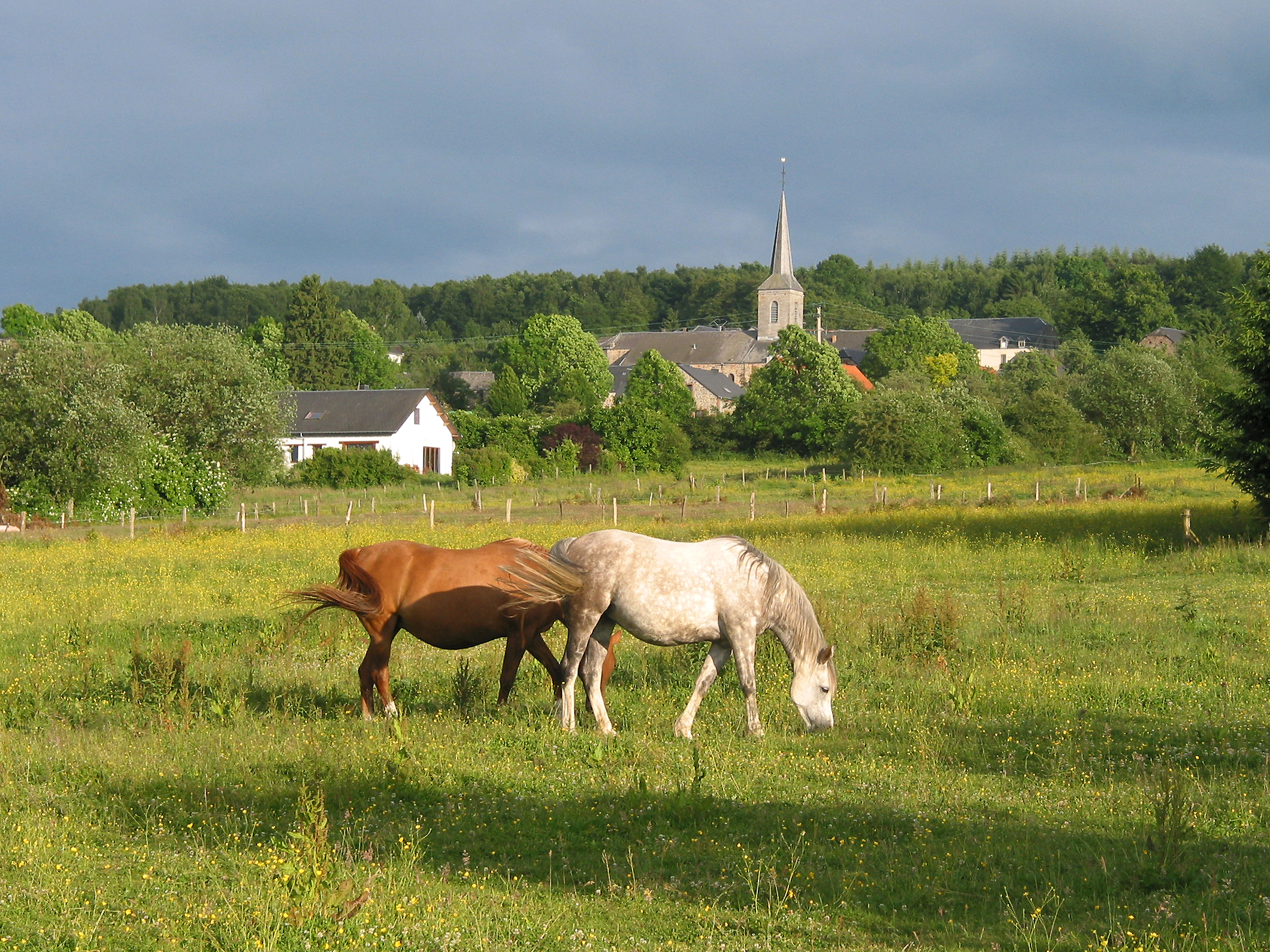
- Froidfontaine

- Location within Belgium Location within Europe
- Coordinates: 50°03′36″N 05°00′03″E
- Country: Belgium
- Region: Wallonia
- Province: Namur
- Municipality: Beauraing

Froidfontaine (French pronunciation: [fʁwafɔ̃tɛn]; Walloon: Froedfontinne) is a village in Wallonia and a district of the municipality of Beauraing, located in the province of Namur, Belgium.

The settlement was established during the Middle Ages, when it was a dependency of the Princely Abbey of Stavelot-Malmedy and belonged to the Duchy of Luxembourg. For a short while during the end of the 17th century, it passed to France. The village sided with the Petite Église following the Concordat of 1801. The current village church was built 1871–72.
