= Javingue =

Javingue Djavingue (Walloon)
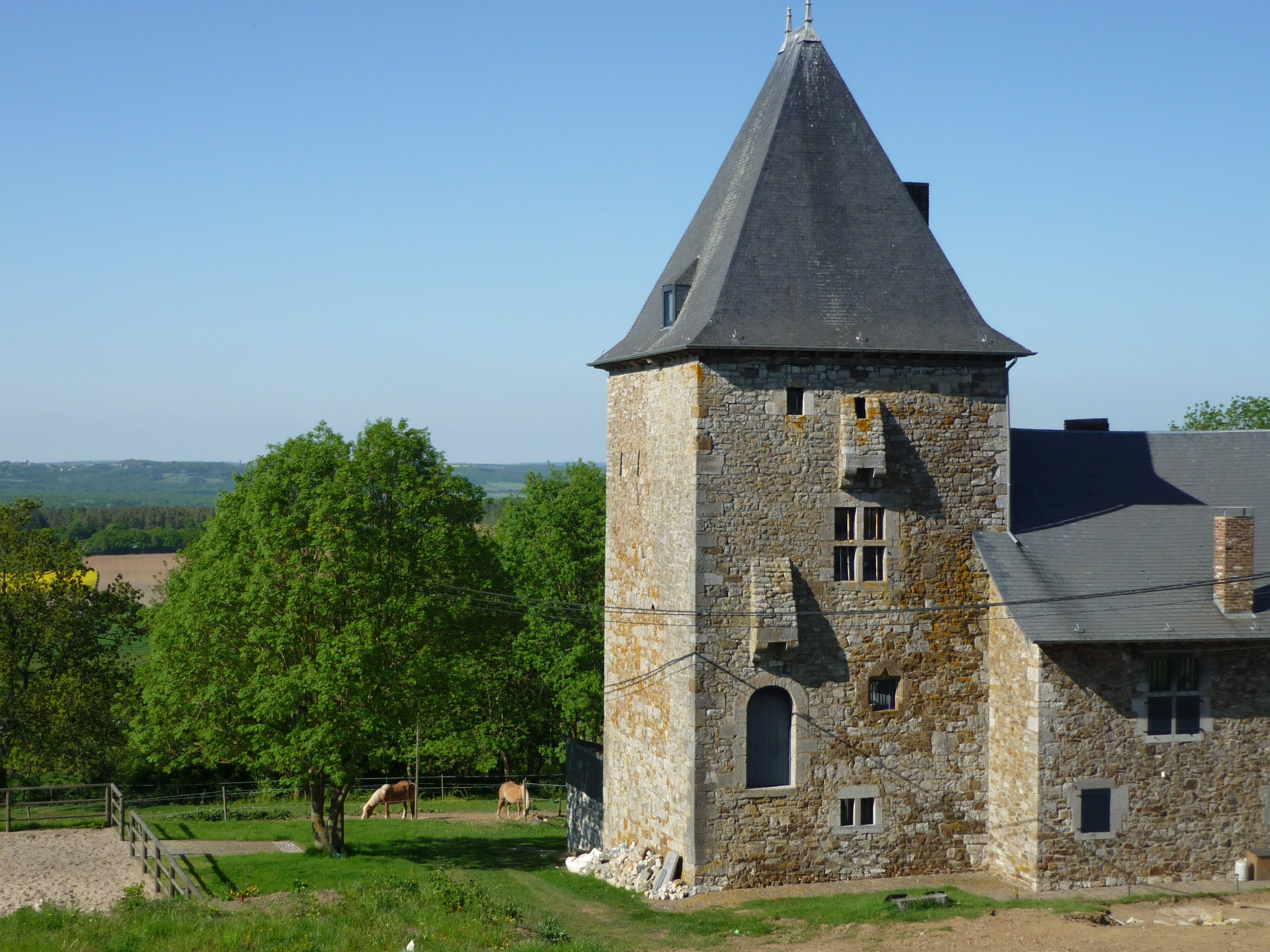
- The medieval Tour de Sevry in Javingue

- Location within Belgium Location within Europe
- Coordinates: 50°05′34″N 04°55′37″E
- Country: Belgium
- Region: Wallonia
- Province: Namur
- Municipality: Beauraing

Javingue (French pronunciation: [ʒavɛ̃ɡ]; Walloon: Djavingue) or Javingue-Sevry is a locality in Wallonia and a district of the municipality of Beauraing, located in the province of Namur, Belgium.

The settlement consists of two former villages, Javingue and Sevry, united in a single municipality and today part of Beauraing. During the Middle Ages, Sevry belonged to the Prince-Bishopric of Liège and Javingue to the Duchy of Luxembourg. The 15th century fortified tower Tour de Sevry lies in Sevry and still retains much of its medieval appearance.
