= Bruley =

- Commune
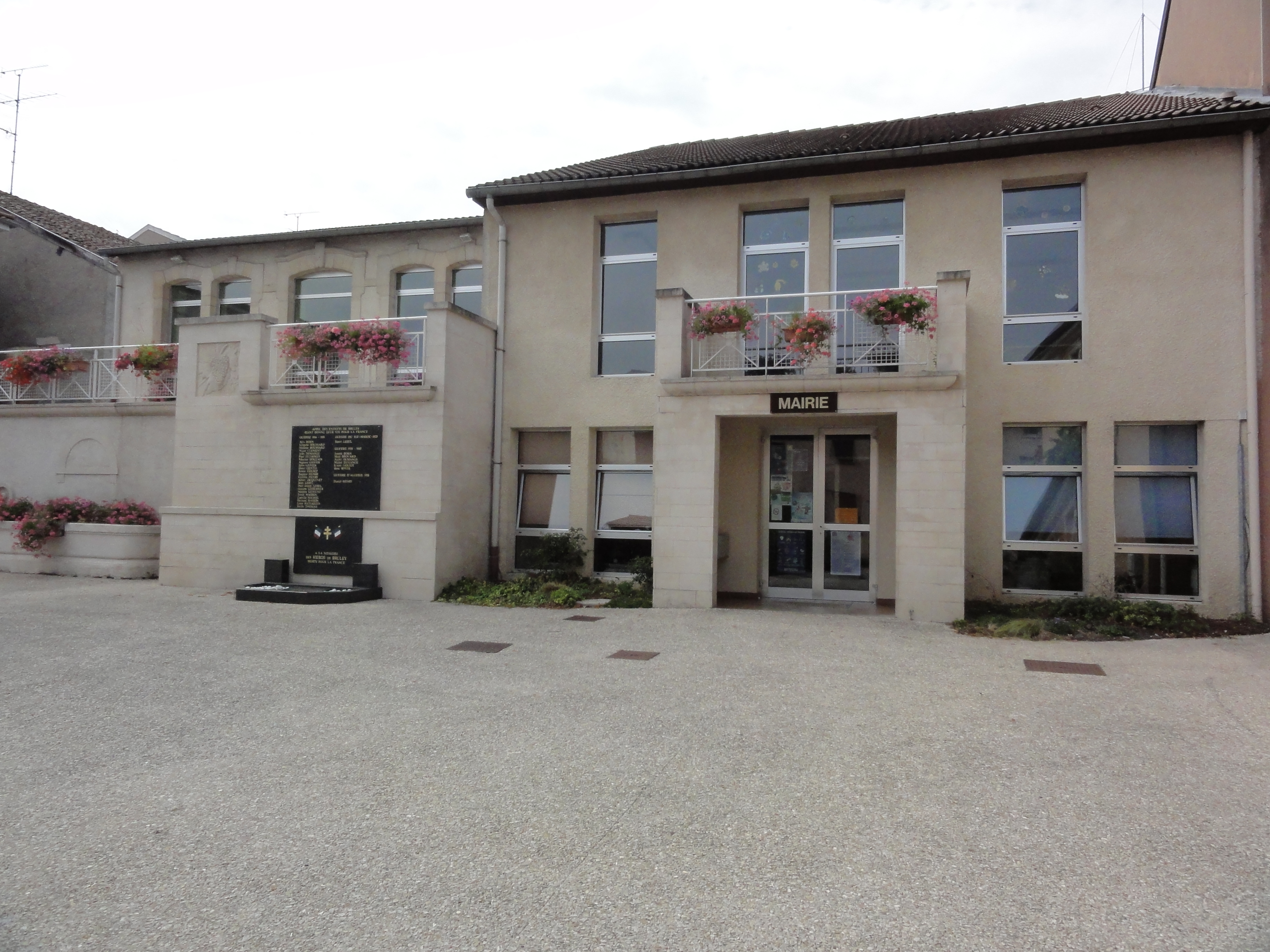
- The town hall in Bruley

- Coat of arms
- Location of Bruley
- Location within France Location within Grand Est
- Coordinates: 48°42′29″N 5°51′03″E
- Country: France
- Region: Grand Est
- Department: Meurthe-et-Moselle
- Arrondissement: Toul
- Canton: Le Nord-Toulois
- Intercommunality: Terres Touloises

Government
  - Mayor (2020–2026): Elisabeth Poirson
- Area^{1}: 6.25 km^{2} (2.41 sq mi)
- Elevation: 263 m (863 ft)
- Highest elevation: 386 m (1,266 ft)
- Lowest elevation: 218 m (715 ft)
- Population (2023): 611
  - Density: 97.8/km^{2} (253/sq mi)
- Time zone: UTC+01:00 (CET)
  - Summer (DST): UTC+02:00 (CEST)
- INSEE/Postal code: 54102 /54200
- ^{1} French Land Register data, which excludes lakes, ponds, glaciers > 1 km^{2} (0.386 sq mi or 247 acres) and river estuaries.

Bruley (French pronunciation: [bʁylɛ]) is a commune in the Meurthe-et-Moselle department in northeastern France.

Bruley is notable for its wine production.

== Population ==
Historical population
| Year | Pop. | ±% p.a. |
|---|---|---|
| 1968 | 350 | — |
| 1975 | 341 | −0.37% |
| 1982 | 382 | +1.64% |
| 1990 | 539 | +4.40% |
| 1999 | 586 | +0.93% |
| 2007 | 574 | −0.26% |
| 2012 | 603 | +0.99% |
| 2017 | 610 | +0.23% |
| 2023 | 611 | +0.03% |
Source: INSEE

== Personalities ==
- Jean-Baptiste Vatelot (1688 – 1748), the canon who founded the Sisters of the Christian Doctrine (Nancy) and the grandson of the Maire [Mayor] of Bruley, François Vatelot (1636 – 1697)
- Claude Manet, the current mayor of Bruley
- Marcel Laroppe, the former manager of the Société Vinicole du Toulois

== See also ==
- Communes of the Meurthe-et-Moselle department
- Parc naturel régional de Lorraine
