= Walloon Legion =

German infantry division

- Légion Wallonie; Ledjon walone
- Sleeve badge worn by soldiers in the Walloon Legion
- Active: 1941–1945
- Country: Belgium
- Allegiance: Nazi Germany
- Branch: Wehrmacht (1941–1943); Waffen-SS (1943–1945)
- Type: Infantry
- Size: 2,000 troops (maximum strength); 7,000–8,000 troops (total, 1941–1945); Battalion, brigade and later division, though never larger than brigade-strength.
- Engagements: World War II; Eastern Front; Anti-Partisan operations in Ukraine; Korsun-Cherkassy Pocket; Operation Solstice; Battle of Tannenberg Line

Commanders
- Notable commanders: Lucien Lippert (1941–February 1944); Léon Degrelle (February 1944–1945)

The Walloon Legion (French: Légion Wallonie, pronounced [leʒjɔ̃ walɔni], lit. 'Wallonia Legion'; Walloon: Ledjon walone) was a unit of the German Army (Wehrmacht) and later of the Waffen-SS recruited among French-speaking collaborationists in German-occupied Belgium during World War II. It was formed in the aftermath of the German invasion of the Soviet Union and fought on the Eastern Front alongside similar formations from other parts of German-occupied Western Europe.

Established in July 1941, the Walloon Legion was envisaged by Léon Degrelle's Rexist Party as a means of demonstrating its loyalty and political indispensability in German-occupied Belgium where it had been largely ignored since the German invasion of May 1940. A similar formation had already been created by Flemish collaborators as the Flemish Legion, preventing Degrelle from being able to establish the "Belgian Legion" he had originally intended. The formation, initially part of the German Army, was officially designated Infantry Battalion 373 (Infanterie Bataillon 373). Degrelle himself enlisted and increasingly saw the unit as a more important political vehicle than the Rexist Party. It participated in fighting on the Eastern Front from February 1942 but struggled to find sufficient recruits in Belgium to replace its persistently heavy losses.

The unit was integrated into the Waffen-SS in June 1943 as the SS Assault Brigade Wallonia (SS-Sturmbrigade Wallonien) and was almost destroyed by Soviet forces in the Korsun–Cherkassy Pocket in February 1944. It expanded slightly after the Allied Liberation of Belgium in September 1944 as Belgian, French, and Spanish collaborators were drafted into the unit. It was upgraded to the notional status of a division and re-designated as the SS Volunteer Grenadier Division Wallonia (SS-Freiwilligen-Grenadier-Division Wallonien) in October 1944. After heavy losses during the 1945 retreats, its remaining personnel surrendered to British forces in April 1945.

== Background ==
At the time of the German invasion in May 1940, Belgium had several political parties that were broadly sympathetic to the authoritarian and anti-democratic ideals represented by Nazi Germany. In Wallonia and Brussels, the largest of these groups was the Rexist Party, led by Léon Degrelle. This had originated as a faction of the mainstream Catholic Block, but split in 1935 to form an independent populist party. Ideologically, Rex supported Belgian nationalism, but its support for corporatism and anti-communism made it sympathetic towards aspects of Nazi ideology. It achieved some early success, peaking in the 1936 Belgian general election in which it received 11.5 percent of the national vote. In spite of this, the party experienced a rapid decline in the years before the German invasion and polled below five percent in the 1939 elections and remained marginal.

After the Belgian surrender on 28 May 1940, the German Military Administration in Belgium and Northern France governed the occupied country. As part of its strategy of indirect rule, the administration preferred to work with established Belgian political and social elites, largely ignoring fringe political groups such as the Rexists.

== Creation of the Walloon Legion, 1941–42 ==
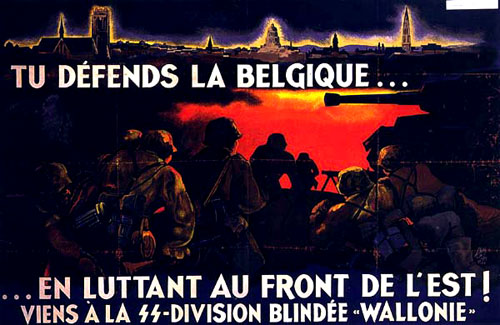
Recruitment poster for the Walloon Legion from c.1943, appealing to Belgian nationalist and anti-communist sentiment. The caption reads "You defend Belgium... by fighting on the Eastern Front".

In order to acquire more influence and German support, Rex attempted to bring itself closer to the occupation authorities. On 1 January 1941, Degrelle announced Rex's total support for the occupation authorities and for the policy of collaborationism. After the German invasion of the Soviet Union on 22 June 1941, it embraced the idea of raising a military unit, seen as "a political opportunity to increase the importance of their movements and eliminate political competition". At the same time, the Flemish National League (Vlaamsch Nationaal Verbond, VNV), a Flemish nationalist and rival authoritarian party in Flanders, also announced its intention to form a "Flemish Legion" to fight in the German Army in the Soviet Union. This move, combined with the Germans' favourable stance towards the VNV, meant that it would not be possible to realise Rex's preferred option of a national "Belgian Legion" on the Eastern Front.

In July 1941, Rex announced that it would raise a unit of volunteers of its own, dubbed the Wallonia Free Corps (Corps Franc Wallonie) or Walloon Legion (Légion Wallonie). Unlike comparable Flemish and Dutch units, the Walloon Legion was established within the German Army (Wehrmacht) because Walloons were not considered sufficiently "Germanic" by Nazi racial theorists to be allowed into the Waffen-SS. Recruitment initially met with little success, leading Degrelle personally to volunteer for the unit as a private as a publicity stunt. In total, some 850 men had volunteered by August 1941, bringing the unit up to the strength of a battalion. Officially designated as Infantry Battalion 373 (Infanterie Bataillon 373), it was sent for training in Meseritz in Germany. As part of Degrelle's notion of an expanded Burgundian-style Belgium, the unit adopted the Cross of Burgundy as its insignia.

Most of the Legion's initial volunteers were Rexist cadres and many had been part of the Combat Formations (Formations de Combat) which served as the party's paramilitary wing. In propaganda, Rex emphasised the anti-communist dimension of the German war effort and argued that collaboration was compatible with Belgian patriotism. The unit encountered various internal problems with some volunteers being unwilling to swear personal allegiance to Adolf Hitler and others being classed as medically unfit; almost a third of the volunteers were repatriated before October 1941. Over the winter of 1941–1942, it participated in training and security operations near Donetsk in Ukraine.

== Eastern Front ==
=== In the Wehrmacht, 1941–43 ===
For the first months after its deployment, the Walloon Legion was deployed in "minor mopping-up operations" behind the Eastern Front from November 1941. One of the Russian émigrés who served in the Legion, Rostislav Zavadskii, at the end of November wrote in his diary about the shootings of civilians suspected of being partisans. Although Feldgendarmerie units did the killing, one Walloon legionary also took part, with Belgian officers and soldiers standing by to watch and taking photographs. The Legion was then attached to the Romanian Army and later to the 100th Jäger Division. It fought its first major engagement against Soviet forces at Hromova Balka near Donetsk on 28 February 1942 as part of the 17th Army. It suffered heavy losses, both from disease and combat, and was reduced to 150 men within its first months. It continued to encounter "enormous losses" throughout 1942. The Legion was posted to the Don River in July 1942 and then moved south to the Caucasus. In one action alone, the unit lost 854 men and Degrelle was seriously wounded. By November 1942 it had been reduced to 187 men.

The high attrition rate within the Walloon Legion required increasing focus on recruitment. The age requirements for volunteers were loosened in early 1942. A second recruitment drive was started in February 1942, recruiting 450 new volunteers of whom many came from Rex's small Rexist Youth (Jeunesse Rexiste) or its paramilitary Combat Formations (Formations de Combat). (Note: The Belgian Resistance launched a major attack ahead of a public parade of the new recruits through Brussels on 10 May 1942. Rex's headquarters was attacked and a bomb set out the boulevard Anspach wounded 10 spectators.) A third "frantic" campaign in November 1942 raised a further 1,700 men. These recruitment drives weakened many Rexist institutions by diverting manpower away from projects in Belgium. At the same time, it failed to secure more than 140 recruits from among the thousands of Belgian prisoners of war held in German camps. However, Degrelle became increasingly keen on the political potential of the Walloon Legion which he saw as a more effective political tool than the Rexist Party in Belgium. As the war continued and the pool of Rexist members fell, the volunteers became "largely non-political 'adventurers' or desperate men", often drawn from the urban working class and the unemployed.

The Legion's record in combat, however, was widely exploited in propaganda and increased Degrelle's legitimacy in the eyes of the German leadership, especially Heinrich Himmler who commanded the SS. In the fighting between February and May 1942, Degrelle was able to rise rapidly through the ranks to Leutnant and received numerous decorations including the Iron Cross. In subsequent months, he received further plaudits and became the only foreign volunteer to be decorated with the Knight's Cross of the Iron Cross with Oak Leaves.

=== In the Waffen-SS, 1943–45 ===
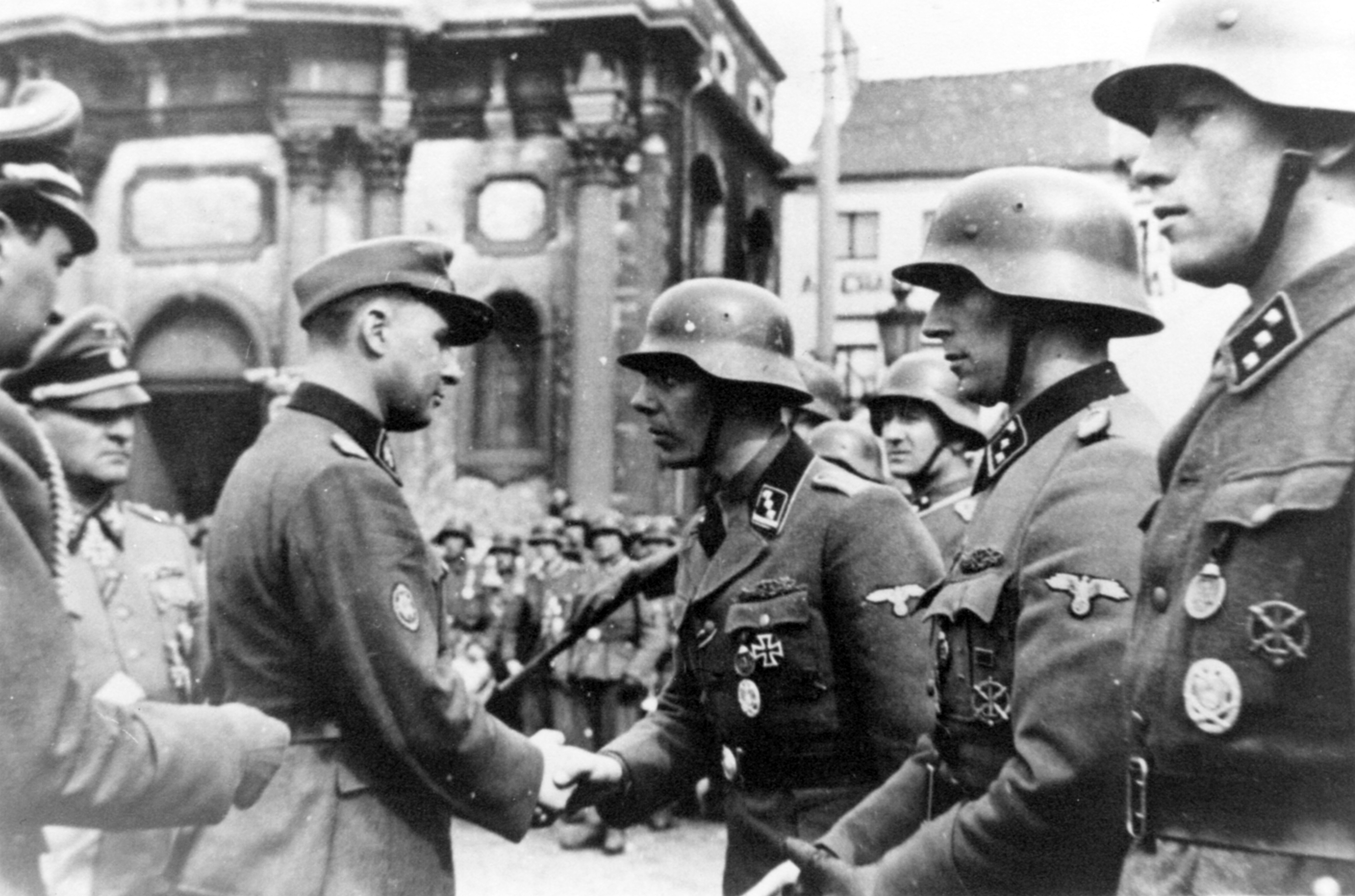
Léon Degrelle, leader of Rex and member of the Walloon Legion, pictured in Charleroi in April 1944. Degrelle saw the Legion as a political tool to gain German support

In late 1942, Himmler declared the Walloons to be a Germanic race, paving the way for the unit's incorporation into the Waffen-SS on 1 June 1943. The Walloon Legion was re-organised into a brigade-sized unit of 2,000 men, known as the SS Assault Brigade Wallonia (SS-Sturmbrigade Wallonien). As part of the transfer, the links between the unit and Rex were cut. The pre-existing structure of welfare organisations set up by Rex in German-occupied Belgium such as Legionary Solidarity (Solidarité légionnaire) were disbanded and replaced by a new autonomous entity known as National Socialist Welfare (Entre'aide Nationale-Socialiste). Degrelle himself spent much of 1943 on a publicity tour of Germany and Belgium.

In November 1943, the new SS-Sturmbrigade Wallonia was deployed for the first time to Ukraine in response to the Soviet Dnieper–Carpathian Offensive. There, the brigade fought as part of the SS Division Wiking in the Korsun–Cherkassy Pocket in February 1944 and suffered 70 percent casualties. By the end of the engagement, the effective strength of the unit had been reduced from 2,000 to 632. Among those killed was the unit's commander Lucien Lippert. A detachment also fought at the Tannenberg Line in Estonia in June 1944, also suffering heavy losses. Degrelle, however, was widely celebrated for his role in the battle at Cherkassy, becoming "the poster boy for all European collaborators" and being featured in Wehrmacht's Signal magazine. The remnants of the unit returned to Belgium where parades were held in Brussels and Charleroi in April 1944. Ahead of its return, largely to encourage more enlistments, the unit was even loaned armoured vehicles by other German units to make it seem more prestigious. Following Lippert's death, Degrelle was promoted to rank of SS-Sturmbannführer, and took command of the brigade.

The Western Allies landed in Normandy in June 1944 and began to advance rapidly towards Belgium. On the Eastern Front, the brigade was hurriedly redeployed in July from its temporary camp in Franconia to participate in the Battle of Tannenberg Line outside Narva alongside other units of the SS from Western Europe including Flanders. In the aftermath of the Allied liberation in September 1944, Degrelle managed to have the brigade upgraded to division-status, after drafting Rexist refugees fleeing the Allied advance and Belgian volunteers from the paramilitary National Socialist Motor Corps (Nationalsozialistisches Kraftfahrkorps, NSKK). The new 28th SS Volunteer Grenadier Division Wallonia (28. SS-Freiwilligen-Grenadier-Division Wallonien) was created in October 1944. It numbered fewer than 4,000 men, making it considerably understrength. French soldiers and Spaniards from the Blue Legion were folded into the unit to increase its numbers.

Early in 1945, the Wallonia Division was deployed to the defence of Pomerania. It participated in fighting at Stargard on 5 February. By the end of the month, it had been reduced to only 700 men and was thrown into a costly attack on the Russian bridgehead at the Oder river in which it lost a further 650 men. In the aftermath of this failure, some of the survivors were evacuated by sea to German-occupied Denmark and headed for Schleswig-Holstein. Degrelle met with Himmler at Plön but was not given any tangible orders and fled to Norway. The surviving personnel of the division surrendered to the British Army at Lübeck to escape capture by Soviet forces.

== Commanders ==
- Captain-Commandant Georges Jacobs (August 1941 – January 1942)
- Captain Pierre Pauly (January 1942 – March 1942)
- Captain George Tchekhoff (March 1942 – April 1942)
- SS-Sturmbannführer Lucien Lippert (April 1942 – 13 February 1944)
- SS-Sturmbannführer Léon Degrelle as political leader of the unit
- SS-Oberführer Karl Burk (21 June 1944 – 18 September 1944)
- SS-Standartenführer Léon Degrelle (18 September 1944 – 8 May 1945)

== Post-war activities ==
Altogether, between 7,000 and 8,000 men served in the Walloon Legion between 1941 and 1944, slightly less than the number of Flemish who served in comparable formations. Some 1,337 were killed, representing about a fifth of its total strength. However, its maximum field strength had never exceeded 2,000 men. In the final weeks of the war, Degrelle fled to German-occupied Norway and flew to Francoist Spain where, sentenced to death in absentia, he remained in exile until his death in 1994.

Survivors of the Legion were sentenced to death after the war, although this was only carried out against the officers and holders of the Knights Cross. The enlisted ranks were let off with 10 to 20 years imprisonment and re-education and training classes between 1946 and 1951. It was reported in 1992 that there were around 1,000 surviving veterans. Many were unrepentant and claimed not to have had any knowledge of Nazi atrocities.

== See also ==
- Flemish Legion
- Walloon Guard, a collaborationist auxiliary police formation founded in November 1941 with Rexist support.
- List of Waffen-SS divisions
- Waffen-SS foreign volunteers and conscripts

== Bibliography ==
- Aron, Paul & Gotovich, José, eds. (2008). "Légion Wallonie". Dictionnaire de la seconde guerre mondiale en Belgique [Dictionary of the Second World War in Belgium] (in French). Brussels: André Versaille. pp. 243–245. ISBN 978-2-87495-001-8.
- LeTissier, Tony (1996). Zhukov at the Oder: the decisive battle for Berlin. Connecticut: Greenwood Publishing Company. ISBN 0-275-95230-4.
- Littlejohn, David (1972). The Patriotic Traitors: A History of Collaboration in German-occupied Europe, 1940-45. London: Heinemann. ISBN 0-434-42725-X.
- Müller, Rolf-Dieter (2012). The Unknown Eastern Front. New York: I, B, Tauris. ISBN 978 1 78076 072 8.
- Plisnier, Flore (2011). Ils ont pris les armes pour Hitler: la collaboration armée en Belgique francophone [They Took Up Arms for Hitler: Armed Collaboration in French-speaking Belgium] (in French). Brussels: Renaissance du Livre. ISBN 978-2-5070-0361-6.
- Wouters, Nico (2018). "Belgium". In Stahel, David (ed.). Joining Hitler's Crusade: European Nations and the Invasion of the Soviet Union, 1941. Cambridge: Cambridge University Press. pp. 260–287. ISBN 978-1-316-51034-6.
