= Beauraing =

Municipality in Wallonia, Belgium

Beauraing Biarin (Walloon)
- City and municipality
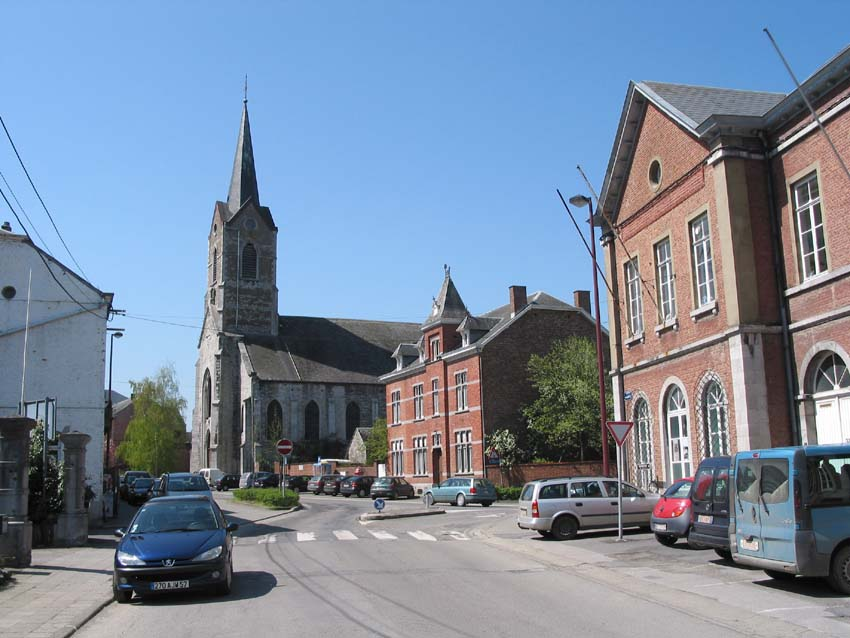
- Beauraing centre

- Flag Coat of arms

- Location of Beauraing in Namur province
- Interactive map of Beauraing
- Location in Belgium
- Coordinates: 50°6.55′N 04°57.4′E
- Country: Belgium
- Community: French Community
- Region: Wallonia
- Province: Namur
- Arrondissement: Dinant

Government
  - Mayor: Marc Lejeune (cdH, EB)
  - Governing party: EB

Area
  - Total: 174.63 km^{2} (67.43 sq mi)

Population (2018-01-01)
  - Total: 9,160
  - Density: 52.5/km^{2} (136/sq mi)
- Postal codes: 5570-5574, 5576
- NIS code: 91013
- Area codes: 082
- Website: www.beauraing.be

Beauraing (French pronunciation: [boʁɛ̃]; Walloon: Biarin) is a municipality and city of Wallonia located in the province of Namur, Belgium. On 1 January 2018, Beauraing had a total population of 9,160. The total area is 174.55 km^{2}, giving a population density of 52 inhabitants per km^{2}.

== History ==
The municipality of Beauraing was created in 1977 and consists of the following districts: Beauraing, Baronville, Dion, Felenne, Feschaux, Focant, Froidfontaine, Honnay, Javingue, Martouzin-Neuville, Pondrôme, Vonêche, Wancennes, Wiesme and Winenne.

Beauraing is a place of pilgrimage for Catholics ever since five children and young adults reported 33 apparitions of the Blessed Virgin Mary between 29 November 1932 and 3 January 1933. The sobriquet applied to these apparitions is Our Lady of Beauraing, the Virgin of the Golden Heart. The apparitions are among those which are officially sanctioned by the Church.

On 17 June 2021 the town was hit by a small tornado, damaging 92 houses and injuring several people.

== See also ==
- List of protected heritage sites in Beauraing
