= Blue Legion =

Unit of Spanish volunteers in the German Wehrmacht during World War II

Spanish Volunteer Legion
- Insignia of the Blue Legion, incorporating the flag of Spain
- Active: 17 November 1943 – 12 April 1944
- Country: Spain
- Allegiance: Germany
- Branch: German Army
- Type: Infantry
- Size: 2,269 troops
- Nickname: Blue Legion
- Engagements: World War II; Eastern Front; Leningrad–Novgorod offensive; Battle of Berlin

Commanders
- Notable commanders: Antonio García Navarro

The Blue Legion (Spanish: Legión Azul; German: Blaue Legion), officially called the Spanish Volunteer Legion (Spanish: Legión Española de Voluntarios; German: Spanische Freiwilligen-Legion), was a volunteer legion created from 2,133 falangist volunteers who remained behind at the Eastern Front after most of the Spanish Blue Division was withdrawn in October 1943 because Francisco Franco had started negotiations with the Allies. It officially consisted of two battalions. It was later estimated that the legion grew to over 3,000 Spaniards.

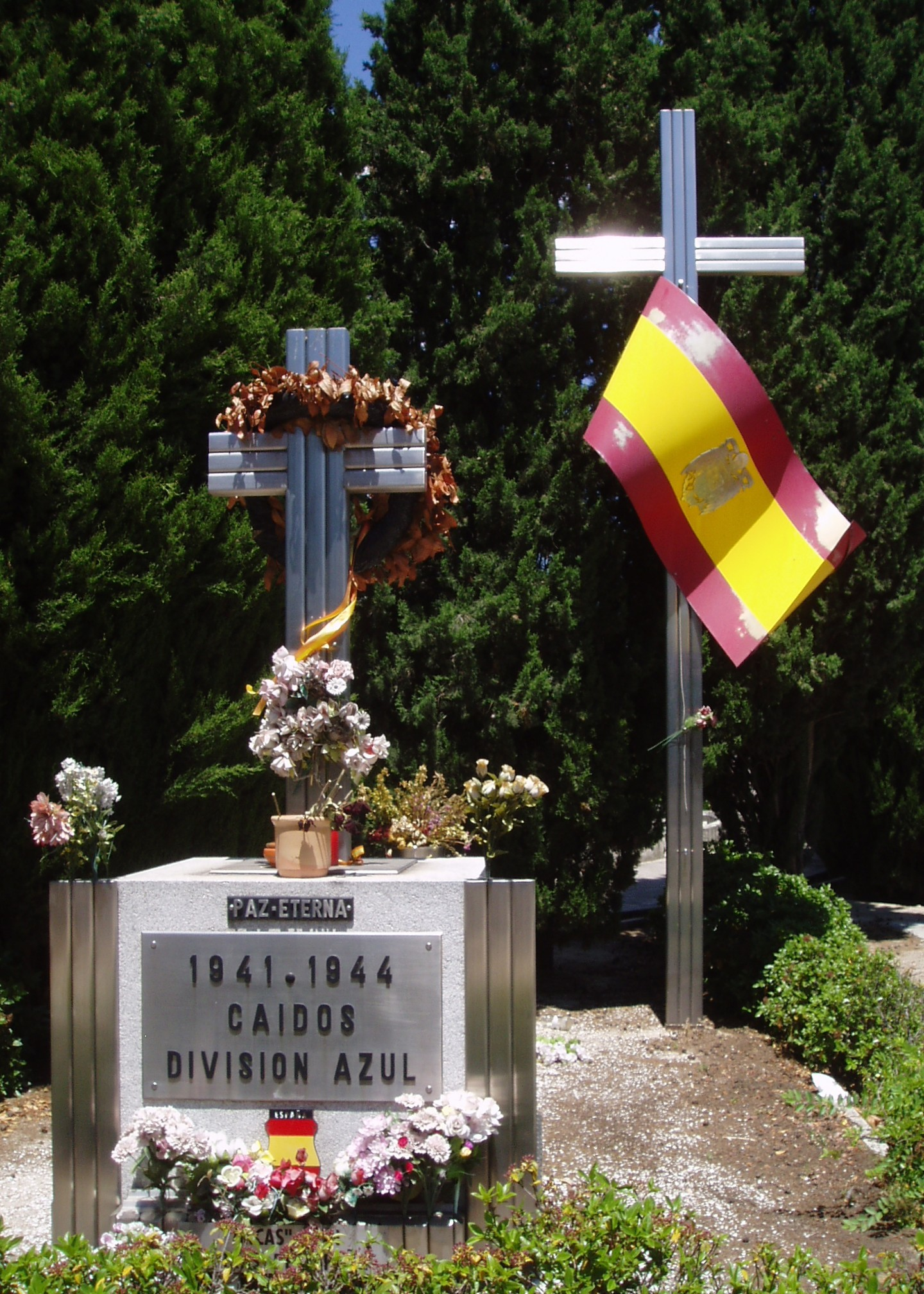
Memorial in the Cementerio de la Almudena to Blue Division and Blue Legion soldiers: note the dates 1941–1944.

A certain number of Spanish volunteers refused to return to Spain and remained on the Eastern Front, integrated into different German units. Some of them would continue to fight until the end of World War II. The 101st SS Spanish Volunteer Company (German: Spanische-Freiwilligen Kompanie der SS 101) of 140 men, composed of four rifle platoons and one staff platoon, was attached to the 28th SS Volunteer Grenadier Division Wallonien (the Walloon Legion) and fought against the Soviets in Pomerania and Brandenburg. Under the command of Miguel Ezquerra, remnants of the legion defended Berlin against an overwhelming Soviet assault from April-May 1945. They fought in and around the central government district of Berlin (Zitadelle sector), which included the Reich Chancellery and the Reichstag, being among the last defenders of the Führerbunker.

The troops bore the word ESPAÑA and a red/yellow/yellow/red horizontally striped shield worn on the upper right arm, and a helmet.
