= Sisters of Christian Doctrine of Nancy =

Roman Catholic religious congregation for women

Sisters of the Christian Doctrine (Nancy)
- Abbreviation: D.C.
- Type: Roman Catholic religious order
- Headquarters: Nancy, France
- Superior General: Sr. Viviane François, D.C.
- Key people: Fr. Jean-Baptist Vatelot, Mother Pauline de Faillonnet, Mother Lucie Bastien, Fr. Jean-François Mougenot
- Website: http://www.doctrine-chretienne.com
- Remarks: Patron saint: Saint Anne

The Sisters of the Christian Doctrine of Nancy (French: Sœurs de la Doctrine Chrétienne de Nancy) (D.C.) is a religious order of the Roman Catholic Church for women, whose primary mission is the teaching and nursing of the poor. Its members place after their names the order's initials, D.C. They are known as the "Vatelottines" in honor of their founder, and also "School Sisters", especially in Germany and Luxembourg, because of their primary mission. They should not be confused with the Spanish order of the Sisters of the Christian Doctrine (Mislata), which was founded in 1880.

== History ==
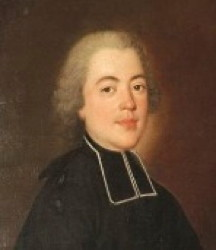
Father Jean Baptiste Vatelot, the founder of the Congregation

In 1718, Jean-Baptiste Vatelot (1688 – 1748), a sacristan (later canon) at the Cathedral of Toul, founded a school for poor girls in the house of his father, Jean Vatelot (1666 – 1741), in Bruley, a village 4.33 kilometers (2.69 miles) northwest of Toul. He placed the school under the protection of St. Anne and entrusted the management of the school to three of his sisters, Marie, Françoise and Barbe. They were joined by another sister, Veronique, and other women as the partnership began to assume the direction of the rural schools of the diocese. The Bishop of Toul, François Blouet de Camilly (1664 – 1723), requested Father Vatelot to formulate the rules for the teachers. According to the Règlement [Regulations] outlined by the priest, the teachers were not bound by religious vows (they were bound to the sisterhood only by their oaths), not held to the cloistered life, not required to wear the religious habit and not even assigned to a house, but they could be sent in pairs to any of the parochial schools that required them.

In spite of the financial difficulties, Father Vatelot managed to buy a house in Toul in 1722 and named it the "Mother School" for the spiritual and professional training of the teachers. Influenced by the essays of St. Francis de Sales and St. Vincent de Paul, he wrote two booklets. One of them was "Christian Meditations" for the spiritual side under the title of Méditations chrétiennes à l'usage des Sœurs Maîtresses d'école du diocèse de Toul [Christian Meditations for the Usage of the Sister Schoolmistresses of the Diocese of Toul], published in 1839 in Nancy. The other was the "Familiar Method" for the professional side, under the title of Méthode familière pour les petites écoles contenant les devoirs des maîtres et des maîtresses d'école, avec la manière de bien instruire [Familiar Method for the Little Schools, containing the Duties of Schoolmasters and Schoolmistresses for the Purpose of Good Teaching], published in 1749 in Toul. short, for the professional side. He intended them to help the Sisters in their guidance of their students to "be all that grows to the dimensions of the Son of God" [pour qu'en tous grandisse l'homme jusqu'à sa pleine dimension de fils de Dieu].

On 1 Oct 1744, the partnership was given official recognition as the Congregation of the Sisters of Christian Doctrine by Stanislas, the Duke of Lorraine. He was joined on 24 July 1752 by the King of France, Louis XV.

When Father Vatelot died on 20 August 1748, his "little school of the diocese" had grown to about 200 members in two countries - the Duchy of Lorraine, which included Bruley and Toul at that time, and the Kingdom of France, which would annex Lorraine in 1766. Father Vatelot's sister, Barbe, the first Superior General, and the schoolmaster, Alexandre-Nicolas Martel (died 1750), continued his mission.

But the order was dissolved by the anti-clerical mood of the French Revolution. It was re-established in 1802 and approved by First Consul Napoleon in 1803. By then, the order had 132 Sisters and a new Superior General, Sister Rosalie Marquant, the third of her office. On 20 September 1804, they converted a former Capuchin monastery in Nancy to their headquarters, the "Motherhouse". Ten days later, they began to wear the religious habit. They also adopted the spiritual philosophy of St. Ignatius de Loyola to "find God in all things" and to guide the development of their order but they kept the original goal.

In 1821, Sister Rosalie died. The Sisters, now numbering 322, then chose Sister Pauline de Faillonnet (1778–1856) to be their fourth Superior General. Assisted by Father Jean-François Mougenot (1790–1857), she would serve for the next 34 years (until 1855), reorganizing the order and breathing fresh life into it. Together, they would send Sisters to Belgium (again) in 1833, Luxembourg in 1841 and even Algeria, also in 1841. Sisters also went to Morocco and Malta in later years but their assignments proved to be temporary. Mother Pauline wrote books and letters; she had chapels and novitiates built. When she died on Christmas Eve of 1856, she was mourned as the second founder of the order.

The Sisters obtained the official Decretum laudis [Latin, "decree of praise"] from Pope Leo XIII on 14 July 1886 and their constitution was confirmed by Pope Pius XI on 12 March 1929.

== Activities ==
The Sisters of the Christian Doctrine are primarily dedicated to the teaching and management of schools. But they also run spiritual centers, orphanages, homes for the aged, and programs for the sick, the disabled, the poor, and assist such organizations as Oxfam, Amnesty International, ATD Fourth World, and Entraide et Fraternité [Agriculture & Brotherhood]. Besides France, Belgium, Luxembourg and Algeria, they have been active in Italy since 1920, the Democratic Republic of the Congo since 1948 (in spite of the 1964 murders of seven Sisters), in South Korea since 1966, Côte d'Ivoire since 1947, Chile since 1967, Romania since 1993, and, since 2010, Cambodia. On 31 December 2005 the congregation had 572 religious in 130 houses. Its motherhouse is in Nancy.

== Bibliography ==
- (fr) Abbé [Blaise-]Eugène Marin, "Chapitre III: M. Vatelot et les Sœurs de la Doctrine Chrétienne" [Chapter III: Mr. Vatelot and the Sisters of the Christian Doctrine]; In: Histoire des Diocèses de Toul, de Nancy & de Saint-Dié, Tome II: De la réunion de Toul à la France au démembrement du diocèse [History of the Dioceses of Toul, of Nancy and of Saint-Dié, Volume II: The Meeting in Toul, France, for the Division of the Diocese] (Nancy: A. Crépin-LeBlond, Imprimeur-Éditeur, 1901), pp. 507–517
- (fr) Abbé Jacques Bombardier, Sœur Anne-Marie Lepage and the Sœurs de la Doctrine chrétienne de Nancy, Les Sœurs Vatelottes du diocèse de Toul : XVIIe-XVIIIe siècles [The Vatelottine Sisters of the Diocese of Toul: 17th–18th Centuries] (Nancy: Sœurs de la doctrine chrétienne, 1988) ISBN 2-9502670-0-9
- (fr) Abbé Jacques Bombardier, Sœur Anne-Marie Lepage and the Sœurs de la Doctrine chrétienne de Nancy, Histoire des Sœurs de la doctrine chrétienne de Nancy [History of the Sisters of the Christian Doctrine of Nancy], 5 volumes. (Nancy: Sœurs de la doctrine chrétienne, 1999) ISBN 2-9502670-5-X

- Tome 1 : les sœurs Vatelottes du diocèse de Toul, XVIIe-XVIIIe siecle [Volume 1 : The Vatelotte Sisters of the Diocese of Toul, 17th - 18th Centuries]. ISBN 2-9502670-0-9
- Tome 2 : Relevement et essor 1789 – 1914 [Volume 2 : Recovery and Development]. ISBN 2-9502670-1-7
- Tome 3 : Spiritualite et Pedagogie [Volume 2 : Spirituality and Education]. ISBN 2-9502670-2-5
- Tome 4 : L'Expension au Luxembourg et en Algerie [Volume 4 : The Expansion to Luxembourg and in Algeria]. ISBN 2-9502670-3-3
- Tome 5 : L'Expension en Belgique, Italie et France [Volume 5 : The Expansion in Belgium, Italy and France]. ISBN 2-9502670-4-1

- (fr) Abbé [Blaise-]Eugène Marin, Jean-François Mougenot : supérieur ecclésiastique de la Congrégation de la doctrine chrétienne, 1790–1857 [Jean-François Mougenot : Ecclesiastical Superior of the Congrégation of the Christian Doctrine, 1790–1857] (Paris: J. Gabalda & Co., 1908)
- (fr) Chanoine [Canon] Puy-Pény, Vie de la révérende mère Pauline de Faillonnet, supérieure générale des Soeurs de la doctrine-chrétienne de Nancy [Life of the Reverend Mother Pauline de Faillonnet, Superior General of the Sisters of the Christian Doctrine of Nancy] (Paris: Jacques Lecoffre, Libraide-Éditeur, 1865) Published in two volumes, available online at the Bayerische Staatsbibliothek [Bavarian State Library]: Volume 1 and Volume 2
- (fr) Essays from the blog, Sur les pas de la présence des sœurs de la Doctrine Chrétienne [Notes about the Presence of the Sisters of the Christian Doctrine]:

- (fr) Sœur Thérèe Olry, "Historique de la Congrégation" [History of the Congregation]. Retrieved 7 February 2013
- (fr) Sœur Anonymée, "Maison Mère : 1804 – 2013" [Motherhouse : 1804 – 2013]. Retrieved 7 February 2013
- (fr) Sœur Anonymée, "Supérieures générales" [Superior Generals]. Retrieved 7 February 2013

- (it) Annuario Pontificio per l'anno 2007 [Pontificial Yearbook for the Year 2007] Vatican City: Libreria Editrice Vaticana (Vatican Publishing House), 2007) ISBN 88-209-7908-X.
- (it) Enciclopedia Universale Rizzoli Larousse [Rizzoli-Larousse Universal Encyclopedia] (15 volumes), (Milan: Rizzoli editore [Rizzoli Editions], 1966–1971)
- (it) Guerrino Pelliccia and Giancarlo Rocca, eds., Dizionario degli Istituti di Perfezione [Dictionary of the Institutes of Perfezione] (10 Volumes) (Milan: Edizioni paoline [Pauline Editions], 1974–2003.
