= Stolpersteine in Prague-Smíchov =

Memorial installations in Czech Republic

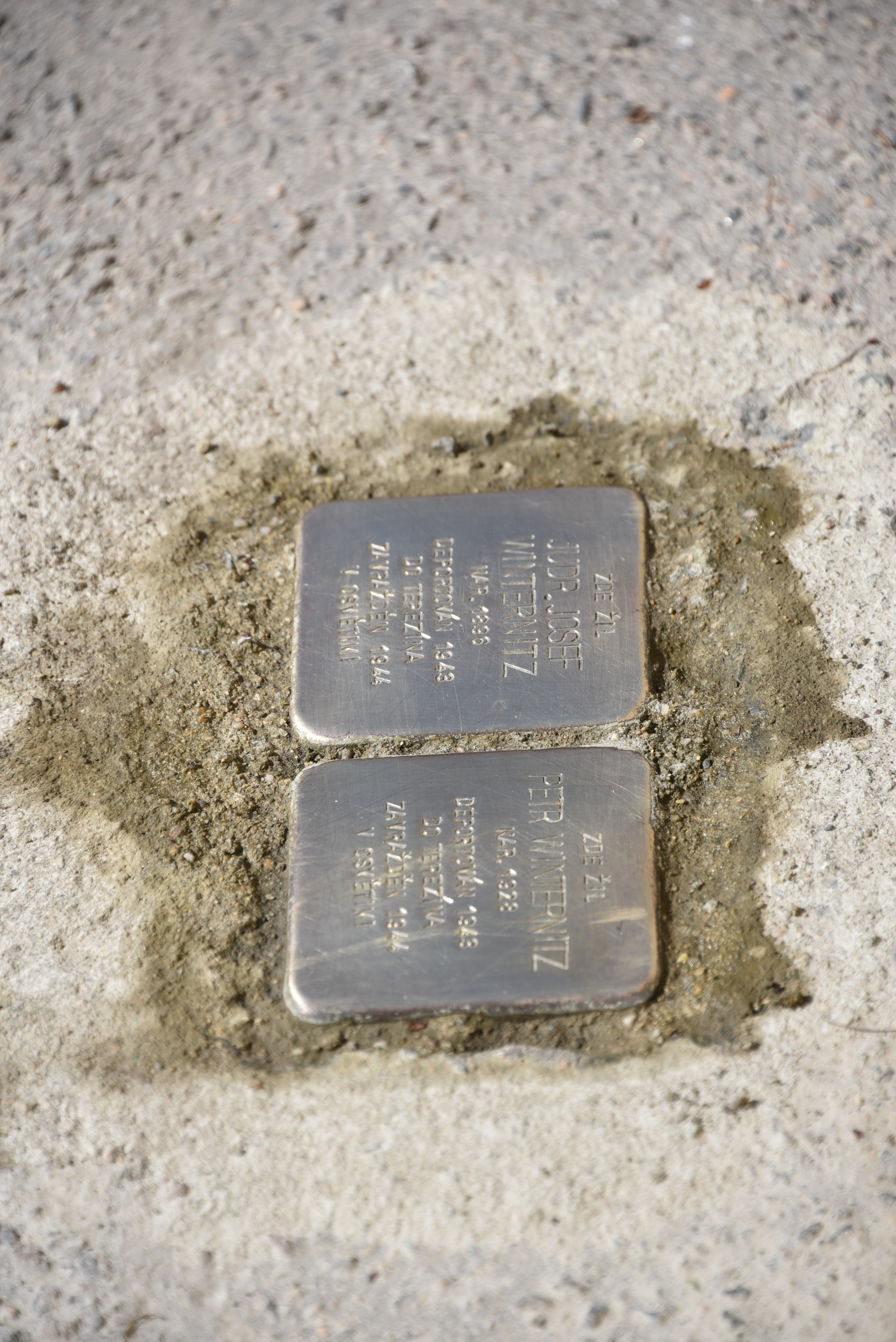
Stolpersteine for Josef und Petr Winternitz in Prag-Smíchov

The Smíchov district of Prague contains several Stolpersteine, stumbling blocks placed all over Europe in a project by German artist Gunter Demnig. They memorialise the fate of victims of the Nazis who were murdered, deported, exiled or driven to suicide.

Generally, the stumbling blocks are placed in front of the building where the victims had their last self-chosen residence. The Czech translation of Stolpersteine is Kameny zmizelých, meaning stones of the disappeared.

== Smíchov ==
Stone	Inscription	Location	Life and death
	HERE LIVED; BERTA KATZOVÁ; NÉE REZKOVÁ; BORN 1876; DEPORTED 1942; TO THERESIENSTADT; MURDERED 1942; IN TREBLINKA	Janáčkovo nábřeží 1211/11 (Praha 5-Smíchov)	Berta Katzová née Rezková was born on 29 March 1876. Her last address before deportation was Prague XVI, Pekařovo nábř. 11. On 20 July 1942, she was deported from Prague to Theresienstadt concentration camp by transport AAs. Her transport number was 64 of 1,000. On 22 October 1942 she was deported to Treblinka extermination camp by transport Bx. Her transport number was now 1879. None of the 2,033 Jews on this transport survived the Shoah.
	HERE LIVED; ALENA ROHATYNOVÁ; BORN 1926; DEPORTED 1942; TO THERESIENSTADT; MURDERED	Na Václavce 1799/15 (Praha 5-Smíchov)	Alena Rohatynová was born on 17 May 1926. Her mother was Irma Rohatynová. Her last address before deportation was Prague XVI, Na Václavce 15. On 30 July 1942, she and her mother were deported from Prague to Theresienstadt concentration camp by transport AAv. Her transport number was 422 of 1,001. On 20 August 1942 she and her mother were deported to Riga by transport Bb, Train Da 402. Her transport number was now 222. None of the 1,001 Jews on this transport survived the Shoah.
	HERE LIVED; IRMA ROHATYNOVÁ; BORN 1886; DEPORTED 1942; TO THERESIENSTADT; MURDERED	Na Václavce 1799/15 (Praha 5-Smíchov)	Irma Rohatynová was born on 1 February 1886. She had a daughter, Alena, born 1926, and most probably also a son. Her last address before deportation was Prague XVI, Na Václavce 15. On 30 July 1942, she and her daughter were deported from Prague to Theresienstadt concentration camp by transport AAv. Her transport number was 421 of 1,001. On 20 August 1942 she and her daughter were deported to Riga by transport Bb, Train Da 402. Her transport number was now 221. None of the 1,001 Jews on this transport survived the Shoah.
	HERE LIVED; JUDR. JOSEF; WINTERNITZ; BORN 1896; DEPORTED 1943; TO THERESIENSTADT; MURDERED 1944; IN AUSCHWITZ	Na Cihlárce 2092/10 (Praha 5-Smíchov)	Dr. jur. Josef Winternitz was born on 21 March 1896. His parents were Isaias Winternitz (1857-1921) and Franziska née Pollak (1862-1933). He had four brothers and three sisters: Leo (born 1881), Rudolf (born 1882), Hedwig (born 1884, later named Freud), Elsa (born 1888, later named Sojka), Olga (born 1890, later named Epstein), Franz (born 1892) and Otto (born 1893). He complete his law studies and married Josefa Jenny. The couple had two children: Suzana (born 1927) and Petr (born 1928). His last address before deportation was Prague XII, Mánesova 72. On 13 July 1943, he and his son were deported from Prague to Theresienstadt concentration camp by transport Di. Her transport number was 112 of 839. On 1 October 1944 he was deported to Auschwitz concentration camp by transport Em. His transport number was now 930 of 1,501. There he was murdered by the Nazi regime. His wife and his daughter, later named Kochannyová, could survive the Shoah. Josefa Jenny Winternitz died in 1979, Suzana Kochannyová in 1990. His daughter had at least four children.
	HERE LIVED; PETR WINTERNITZ; BORN 1928; DEPORTED 1943; TO THERESIENSTADT; MURDERED 1944; IN AUSCHWITZ	Na Cihlárce 2092/10 (Praha 5-Smíchov)	Petr Winternitz was born on 1928. His parents were Josef and Josefa Jenny Winternitz. He had an older sister, Suzana (born 1927). On 13 July 1943, he and his father were deported from Prague to Theresienstadt concentration camp by transport Di. Her transport number was 113 of 839. On 1 October 1944 his father was deported to Auschwitz concentration camp, where he was murdered by the Nazi regime. On 23 October 1944 also Petr Winternitz was deported to Auschwitz by transport Et. His transport number was now 1164 of 1,714. There he was murdered by the Nazi regime. His mother and his sister could survive the Shoah.

== Dates of collocations ==
According to the website of Gunter Demnig the Stolpersteine of Prague were posed on 8 October 2008, 7 November 2009, 12 June 2010, 13 to 15 July 2011 and on 17 July 2013 by the artist himself. A further collocation occurred on 28 October 2012, but is not mentioned on Demnig's page. The Stolpersteine on Na Václavce 1799/15 must have been collocated 2008 or 2009 as there is picture of them from 27 February 2010.

The Czech Stolperstein project was initiated in 2008 by the Česká unie židovské mládeže (Czech Union of Jewish Youth) and was realized with the patronage of the Mayor of Prague.

== See also ==
- List of places with Stolpersteine
- Stolpersteine in the Czech Republic
