= Stolpersteine in Milovice =

Memorial installation in Czech Republic

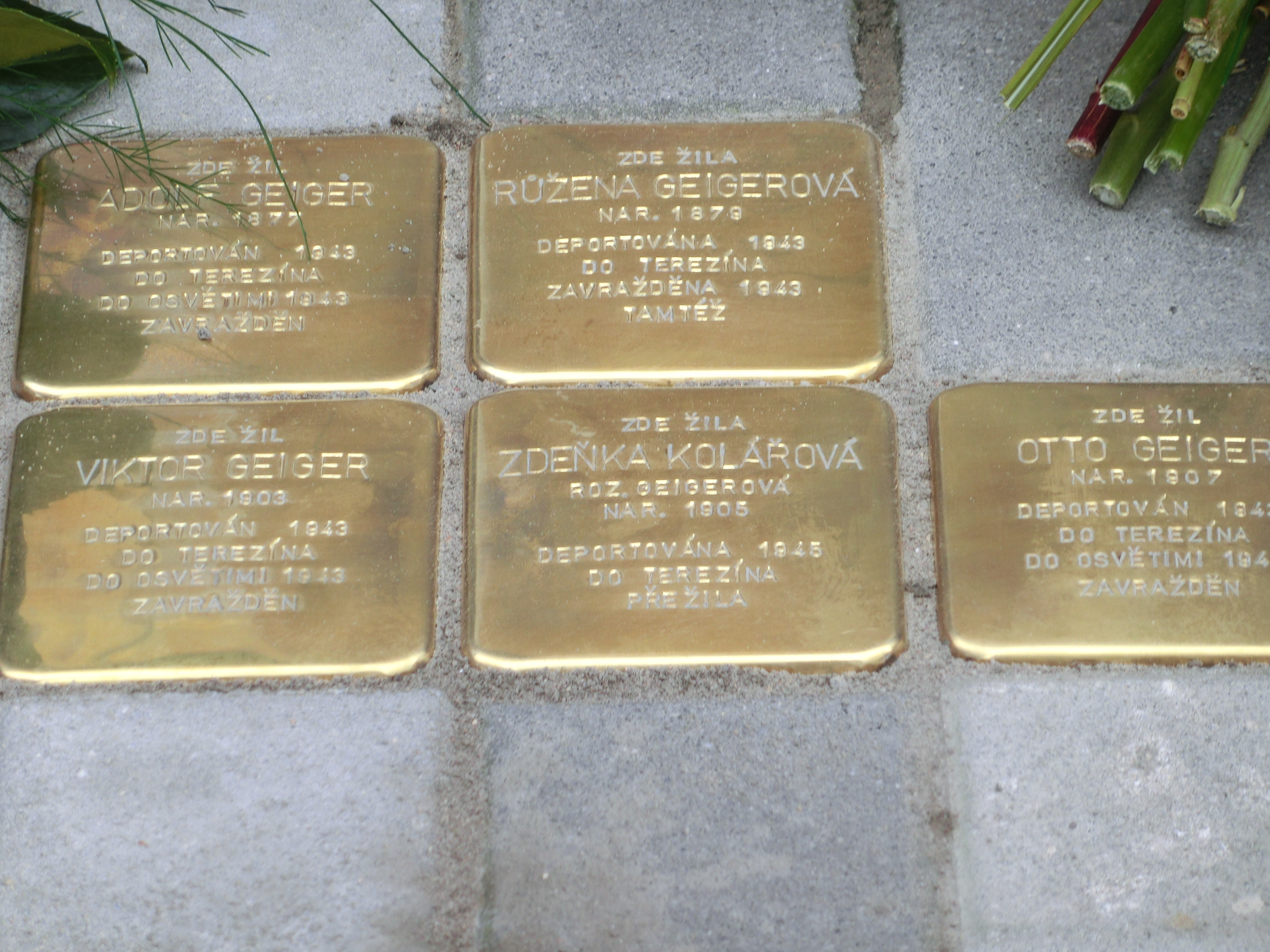
All five Stolpersteine from Milovice

This article lists the Stolpersteine in the town of Milovice in the Central Bohemian Region of the Czech Republic. Stolpersteine is the German name for stumbling blocks collocated all over Europe by German artist Gunter Demnig. They remember the fate of the Nazi victims being murdered, deported, exiled or driven to suicide.

Generally, the stumbling blocks are posed in front of the building where the victims had their last self chosen residence. The name of the Stolpersteine in Czech is: Kameny zmizelých, stones of the disappeared.

The lists are sortable; the basic order follows the alphabet according to the last name of the victim.

== Milovice ==
Stone	Inscription	Location	Life and death
	HERE LIVED; ADOLF GEIGER; BORN 1877; DEPORTED 1943; TO THERESIENSTADT; TO AUSCHWITZ 1943; MURDERED	ČSA 152/11	Adolf Geiger war born on 26 December 1877. He was married to Rosa Růžena née Iltis. The couple had three children, Viktor (born 1903), Zdeňka (born 1905) and Otto (born 1907). After the destruction of Czechoslovakia by the German Nazi regime, his family was step by step limited in its income, property and freedom and lastly deprived of their lives. On 13 January 1943 he, his wife and his son Viktor were arrested and deported from Mladá Boleslav to Theresienstadt concentration camp by transport Cl. His transport number was 56 of 552. There his family was torn apart. Already one week later, on 20 January 1943, his son Viktor was deported to Auschwitz. On 13 February 1943, his wife died in Theresienstadt due to starvation and grieve. On 6 March 1943 his son Otto arrived in Theresienstadt, but he too was deported to Auschwitz six months later. On 15 December 1943, also Adolf Geiger was deported to Auschwitz with transport Dr. Most probably he was murdered there on the day of his arrival in one of the gas chambers. Both sons lost their lives in Auschwitz. His daughter was deported to Theresienstadt in 1945, she could survive.
	HERE LIVED; OTTO GEIGER; BORN 1907; DEPORTED 1943; TO THERESIENSTADT; TO AUSCHWITZ 1943; MURDERED	ČSA 152/11	Otto Geiger born in 1907. His parents were Adolf Geiger and Rosa Růžena née Iltis. He had two siblings, Viktor (born 1903) and Zdeňka (born 1905). On 6 March 1943 he was arrested and deported from Prague to Theresienstadt concentration camp by transport Cv. His transport number was 300. On 6 September 1943 he was deported to Auschwitz concentration camp by transport Dl. His transport number was 589. He lost his life there. His mother was brought to death in Theresienstadt before his arrival there. His father and his brother were murdered in Auschwitz.
	HERE LIVED; VIKTOR GEIGER; BORN 1903; DEPORTED 1943; TO THERESIENSTADT; TO AUSCHWITZ 1943; MURDERED	ČSA 152/11	Viktor Geiger was born on 20 June 1903. His parents were Adolf Geiger and Rosa Růžena née Iltis. He had two siblings, Zdeňka (born 1905) and Otto (born 1907). On 13 January 1943 he and his parents were arrested and deported from Mladá Boleslav to Theresienstadt concentration camp by transport Cl. His transport number was 58 of 552. One week later, on 20 January 1943, he was deported to Auschwitz concentration camp by transport Dl. His transport number was 877 of 2,000. He lost his life there. His mother died in Theresienstadt, three weeks after his deportation. Both his father and his brother were murdered at Auschwitz. His sister could survive.
	HERE LIVED; RŮŽENA GEIGEROVÁ; BORN 1879; DEPORTED 1943; TO THERESIENSTADT; TO AUSCHWITZ 1943; MURDERED	ČSA 152/11	Rosa Růžena Geigerová née Iltis was born on 16 October 1879 in Újezd. Her parents were Salomon Iltis and Katharina née Pfeifer (ca. 1855–1930). She had three sisters and three brothers: Berta (ca. 1878–1933, married to Emil Sušicky, two children), Ernest Iltis (born 1878), Arthur (born 1881), Olga (born 1885, married to Josef Lustig), Oskar Iltis (born 1892, married, one daughter) and Flora (married to Karl Kafka). She was married to Adolf Geiger. The couple had three children: Viktor (born 1903), Zdeňka (born 1905, later married to Jan Kolář) and Otto (born 1907). Her last residence before deportation was in Milovice. On 13 January 1943 she, her husband and their son Viktor were arrested and deported from Mladá Boleslav to Theresienstadt concentration camp by transport Cl. Her transport number was 57 of 552. Already one week later, on 20 January 1943, her son Viktor was deported to Auschwitz. On 13 February 1943 she died in Theresienstadt due to starvation and grieve. Her husband and both sons were murdered at Auschwitz. Also at least two of her siblings were killed in the course of the Shoah, Olga in 1941 in Poland and Oskar in 1944 in Auschwitz. The fate of three of her siblings is not known. Her daughter Zdeňka could survive.
	HERE LIVED; ZDEŇKA KOLÁŘOVÁ; NÉE GEIGEROVÁ; BORN 1905; DEPORTED 1945; TO THERESIENSTADT; SURVIVED	ČSA 152/11	Zděnka Kolářová née Geigerová was born in 1905. Her parents were Adolf Geiger and Rosa Růžena née Iltis. She had two brothers, Viktor (born 1903) and Otto (born 1907). She was arrested and deported to Theresienstadt concentration camp in 1945. She could survive the Shoah. Her mother was murdered in Theresienstadt, her father and both brothers in Auschwitz.

== Date of collocations ==
The Stolpersteine in Milovice were collocated by the artist himself on 13 September 2014.

The Czech Stolperstein project was initiated in 2008 by the Czech Union of Jewish Youth and was realized with the patronage of the Mayor of Prague.

== See also ==
- List of places with Stolpersteine
