= Stolpersteine in Karlovy Vary Region =

Memorial installation in Czech Republic

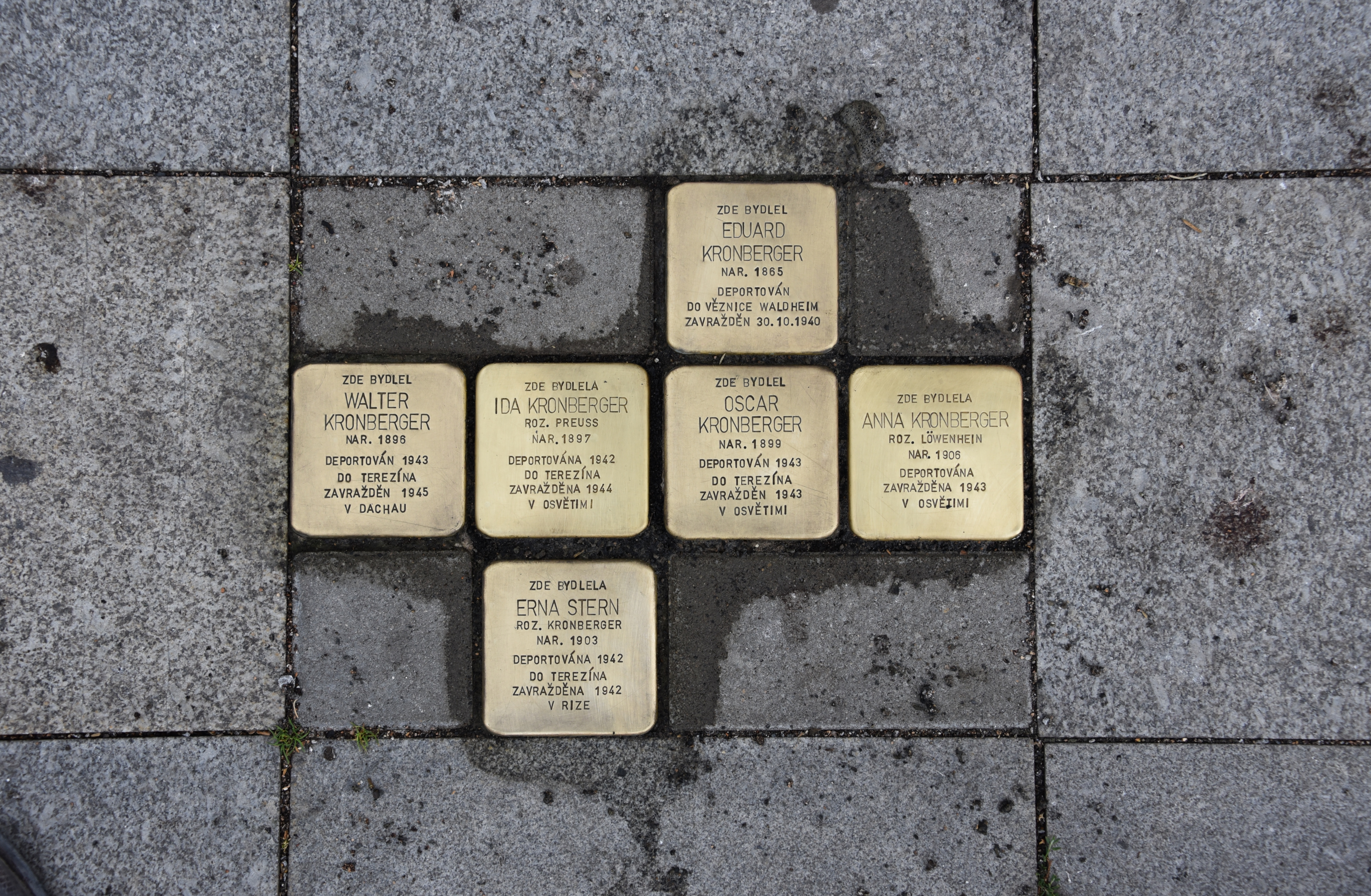
Stolpersteine in Chodov

This article lists the Stolpersteine in the Karlovy Vary Region (Czech: Karlovarský kraj, also "Carlsbad Region") in the westernmost part of Bohemia. Stolpersteine is the German name for stumbling blocks collocated all over Europe by German artist Gunter Demnig. They remember the fate of the Nazi victims being murdered, deported, exiled or driven to suicide.

Generally, the stumbling blocks are posed in front of the building where the victims had their last self chosen residence. The name of the Stolpersteine in Czech is: Kameny zmizelých, stones of the disappeared.

The lists are sortable; the basic order follows the alphabet according to the last name of the victim.

== Chodov ==
| Stone | Inscription | Location | Life and death |
|---|---|---|---|
| | HERE LIVED; MUDR. BEDŘICH; KETTNER; NÉE KOHN; BORN 1889; ARRESTED 1941; MURDERED 1942; IN MAUTHAUSEN | Komenského 1077; 50°14′19″N 12°44′57″E | Bedřich Antonín Kettner née Kohn, born in 1889, studied medicine and married Mariana Picková. The couple had a son, Jiří, born in 1930. The historian Miloš Bělohlávek from Chodov has found out that Kettner had tried several times to leave the country - after the occupation of the Czechoslovak border areas in 1938 by the Nazi regime. He wanted to bring himself and his family to Switzerland to secure their survival. However, the flight did not succeed. He was arrested in 1941 and murdered in Mauthausen concentration camp in 1942. In 1943, his wife and his son were killed in Auschwitz concentration camp. |
| | HERE LIVED; JIŘÍ KETTNER; BORN 1930; DEPORTED 1942; TO THERESIENSTADT; MURDERED 1943; IN AUSCHWITZ | Komenského 1077; 50°14′19″N 12°44′57″E | Jiří Kettner, born on 14 March 1930, was the son of Bedřich and Mariana Kettner. Together with his mother, he was deported from Prague to Theresienstadt concentration camp on 27 July 1942, and on 15 December 1943 to Auschwitz concentration camp. There he and his mother were murdered by the Nazi regime. His father had already been murdered in the Mauthausen concentration camp in 1942. |
| | HERE LIVED; MARIANA; KETTNER; NÉE PICKOVÁ; BORN 1901; DEPORTED 1942; TO THERESIENSTADT; MURDERED 1943; IN AUSCHWITZ | Komenského 1077; 50°14′19″N 12°44′57″E | Mariana Kettnerová née Picková was born on 11 November 1901. She married the doctor Bedřich Antonín Kettner. The couple had a son, Jiří, born in March 1930. After the emigration plans of the family failed, her husband was deported 1941. Mariana Kettnerová had to leave the city together with her son and came to Prague, where the last address was Chocholouškova 7 in Prague VIII. On 27 July 1942 mother and son were deported from Prague to Theresienstadt concentration camp by transport AAu. Their transport numbers were 102 and 103. On 15 December 1943, the two were transferred to Auschwitz concentration camp. Their transport numbers were 1013 and 1012. Both were murdered by the Nazi regime. The husband of Mariana Kettnerová had already been murdered in Mauthausen concentration camp in 1942. |
| | HERE LIVED; ANNA KRONBERGER; NÉE LÖWENHEIN; BORN 1906; DEPORTED; MURDERED 1943; IN AUSCHWITZ | Staroměstská 18; 50°14′17″N 12°44′55″E | Anna Kronberger née Löwenhein was born in 1906 in Dallwitz, Germany. Prior to WWII she lived in Booßen, later-on in Berlin. Married to Oscar Kronberger. On 19 April 1943, she was deported from Berlin to Auschwitz concentration camp with Transport 37. There she was murdered. |
| | HERE LIVED; EDUARD KRONBERGER; BORN 1865; DEPORTED; TO THE WALDHEIM JAIL; MURDERED 30.10.1940 | Staroměstská 18; 50°14′17″N 12°44′55″E | Eduard Kronberger was born on 30 July 1865 in Soběslav. He was one of ten children of Seligmann Kronberger (1830–1886) und Franziska geb. Rind (around 1835 in Přehořov – 1887 in Soběslav). He moved to Chodov, became a merchant and married Jenny née Löwy (born on 10 February 1875). The couple had five children: sons Walter (born 1896) and Oskar (born 1899) as well as daughters Franziska (born on 20. März 1898 in Chodov), Erna (born 1903) and Frieda. His wife died on 25 March 1929 in Chodov. After the Germans invaded, he was arrested and interned at the prison of Waldheim, Saxony. He was murdered by the Nazi regime on 30 October 1940. Both of his sons, Walter & Oscar, and daughter Erna were also murdered in the course of the Shoah. Three of his grandchildren, Adolph (Avraham) Ruth and Kurt, were saved. Ruth (12) & Kurt (10) via the so-called Winton train. They were sent to Great Britain to a kind foster family. |
| | HERE LIVED; IDA KRONBERGER; NÉE PREUSS; BORN 1897 in Straubing Germany; DEPORTED 1942; TO THERESIENSTADT; MURDERED 1944; IN AUSCHWITZ | Staroměstská 18; 50°14′17″N 12°44′55″E | Ida Kronberger née Preuss was born on 19 January 1897. She married Walter Kronberger. The couple had two children, Adolf (Avraham) and Ruth. Ida Kronberger was deported with Transport Ba on 10 August 1942 from Prague to Theresienstadt concentration camp. Her transport number was 1145 of 1,474. On 6 October 1944, she was transferred to Auschwitz concentration camp with transport Eo. Her transport number was 200 of 1,550. There she lost her life. Her husband Walter, was killed at Dachau concentration camp in February 1945. Son Adolph (17) was sent To Palestine(1939).Daughter Ruth was saved in time through the children's train Winton Train to Great Britain. Later lived in the U.S.A (d.2021) and had 3 children, Walter (b.1950), Ron (b.1951) and Lida (b.1970). |
| | HERE LIVED; OSCAR KRONBERGER; BORN 1899; DEPORTED 1943; TO THERESIENSTADT; MURDERED 1943; IN AUSCHWITZ | Staroměstská 18; 50°14′17″N 12°44′55″E | Oscar Kronberger, also Oskar, was born on 12 December 1899. He was the second son of merchant Eduard Kronberger and Jenny née Löwy (1875-1929). He had one older brother, Walter (born 1896), and three sisters: Franziska (born 1898), Erna (born 1903, later married Julius Stern) and Frieda (later named Bergmann). He married Anna Lowenheim and both were deported to Theresienstadt concentration camp in 1943 and murdered in the same year by the Nazi regime at Auschwitz concentration camp. He was married to Anna née Löwenhein, also murdered in Auschwitz in 1943. |
| | HERE LIVED; WALTER KRONBERGER; BORN 1896; DEPORTED 1943; TO THERESIENSTADT; MURDERED 1945; IN DACHAU | Staroměstská 18; 50°14′17″N 12°44′55″E | Walter Kronberger, also Valtr (Walter), was born in Chodov on 14 July 1896. He was the eldest son of merchant Eduard Kronberger and his wife Jenny née Löwy. The Kronbergers had a total of five children, the daughters Franziska, Erna and Frieda as well as the sons Walter and Oskar. The fate of Franziska is unknown. Frieda married Bergmann and survived with daughters Vera (b.1921) & Alice (b.1925). Walter Kronberger married Ida Kronberger née Preuss. The couple had two children, Adolf (1922-1977) and Ruth (1927-2021). Before deportation into a concentration camp, the national socialists forced most Czech Jews to leave their home communities and move to a collective apartment in the capital. His last residential address before deportation was Prague XII, V Horní Stromovce 7. Walter Kronberger was deported to Theresienstadt concentration camp on 9 March 1943, where his wife had been living since August 10 of 1942. His transport number was 57. On 29 September 1944 he was deported from Theresienstadt to Auschwitz concentration camp. His transport number was 224. How he came from there to Dachau concentration camp is unknown. However, he was murdered there by the Nazi regime on 6 February 1945. His wife Ida, had already been transferred to Auschwitz on 6 October 1944 and had been murdered there. Son Adolf lived in Israel and later in the U.S.A. He married Chava Princz and has 2 children Amit (b.1945) and Idit (b.1952). Daughter Ruth was brought to safety in time to Great Britain with the Winton train. Later married Shalom Kagan and lived in the U.S. |
| | HERE LIVED; ERNA STERN; NÉE KRONBERGER; BORN 1903; DEPORTED 1942; TO THERESIENSTADT; MURDERED 1942; IN RIGA | Staroměstská 18; 50°14′17″N 12°44′55″E | Erna Stern née Kronberger was born on 5 March 1903 in Chodov. Her parents were Eduard and Jenny Kronberger. She had two sisters, Franziska and Frieda, whose fate is unknown, and two brothers, Walter and Oscar, who, like their father, were assassinated by the Nazi regime. She married Julius Stern, the couple had a child Kurt, before Julius passed away. Kurt survived with Ruth and Adolph. Lived in Israel and Married Liza. Had 2 Children, Yoel Stern and Orna Weinstein (Stern). Together with her sister-in-law Ida Kronberger, she was deported from Prague to Theresienstadt concentration camp on 10 August 1942. Her transport number was 1146. From there she was deported by transport Bb to Riga on 20 August 1942 and then murdered. Her transport number was 950. None of the 1,001 Jews deported with this train survived the Shoah. |

== Dates of collocations ==
The Stolpersteine in the Karlovy Vary region were collocated by the artist himself on the following dates:

- 2 August 2015: Staroměstská 18
- 1 August 2016: Komenského 1077

== See also ==
- List of places with Stolpersteine
