= Stolpersteine in South Bohemian Region =

Memorial installations in Czech Republic

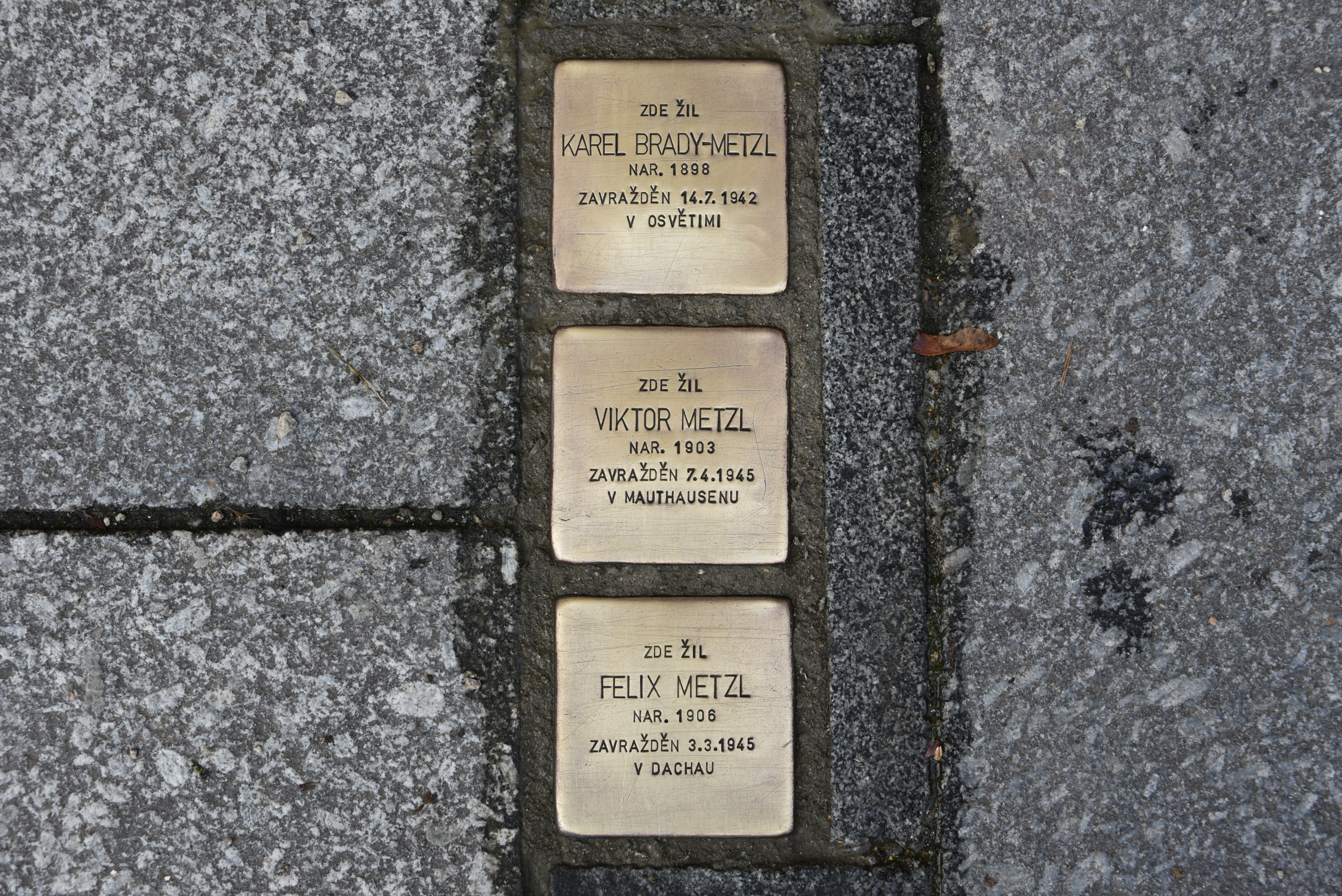
Stolpersteine in Třeboň

This article lists the Stolpersteine in the Czech region Jihočeský kraj (South Bohemian Region). Stolpersteine is the German name for stumbling blocks collocated all over Europe by German artist Gunter Demnig. They help humanity remember the fate of the Nazi victims being murdered, deported, exiled or driven to suicide.

Generally, the stumbling blocks are located in front of the building where the victims had their last self chosen residence. The name of the Stolpersteine in Czech is: Kameny zmizelých, stones of the disappeared. The Stolpersteine in Třeboň were laid on 6 June 2010. It was the third collocation in the Czech Republic, collocations in Brno and Ostrava followed several days later.

== České Budějovice ==
| Stone | Inscription | Location | Life and death |
|---|---|---|---|
| | HERE STUDIED; HARRY KENDE; BORN 1927; DEPORTED 1942; TO THERESIENSTADT; TO AUSCHWITZ 1944; MURDERED 1945; IN FLOSSENBÜRG | Česká 142/64; 48°58′29″N 14°28′19″E | Harry Kende was born on 24 March 1927 in České Budějovice. On the 18 April 1942 he was deported in the wake of Transport Akb, Nr. 222 from České Budějovice to Theresienstadt concentration camp. From there, he was deported to Auschwitz concentration camp on 28 September by transport EK, Nr. 586. Later on he was brought to Flossenbürg concentration camp where he was murdered on 8 March 1945. The stumbling block is located in front of his former school building. Moreover, Vilém Kende (1883–1944) who was most likely Harry Kende's Uncle and his wife Valerie Kendeová (1888–1944) were also murdered in Auschwitz. Together with Harry Kende, on 18 April 1942, several family members were deported., i.e. with number 224 his father Vitezslav Kende, who was murdered in Auschwitz in 1944. Vilém Kende (1883-1944), an uncle of Harry Kende, and his wife Valerie Kendeová (1888-1944) were also murdered in Auschwitz in 1944. Their son Viktor, who was also deported with the transport Akb, has survived. In March 1942 Harry Kende's uncle Joseph was deported to Theresienstadt together with his wife Helena and the three sons Erich, Oto and Rudolf. He and his wife were murdered in Auschwitz, and son Erich died in Dachau. Son Oto survived the liberation of Mauthausen, but died shortly thereafter. Rudolf could survive and returned to České Budějovice. |

== Chlum u Třeboně ==
| Stone | Inscription | Location | Life and death |
|---|---|---|---|
| | HERE LIVED; KAREL WEISSKOPF; BORN 1883; DEPORTED; 1942 TO THERESIENSTADT; 1942 TO WARSAW; MURDERED | Hejmanské hráze 11; 48°57′33″N 14°56′00″E | Karel Weisskopf was born on 26 February 1883. He married Irma Weisskopfová, the couple had three children. They made a living with their own distillery which also included a pub. They were later driven out of their house and lost the distillery. On 18 April the married couple were deported from České Budějovice to Theresienstadt concentration camp. On 26 April 1942, Karel and his wife were brought to Warsaw Ghetto where they were both murdered. |
| | HERE LIVED; IRMA WEISSKOPFOVÁ; BORN 1889; DEPORTED; 1942 TO THERESIENSTADT; 1942 TO WARSAW; MURDERED | Hejmanské hráze 11; 48°57′33″N 14°56′00″E | Irma Weisskopfovà was born on 20 October 1889. She was married to Karel Weisskopf, the couple had three children. On 18 April 1942 she and her husband were deported from České Budějovice to Theresienstadt concentration camp by transport AK/B, Nr. 820 and 821. Afterwards, on 26 April they were both transferred by transport An, Nr. 967 and 968, to Warsaw Ghetto, where they were murdered. |

== Třeboň ==
| Stone | Inscription | Location | Life and death |
|---|---|---|---|
| | HERE LIVED; KAREL BRADY-METZL; BORN 1898; MURDERED 14.7.1942; IN AUSCHWITZ | Masarykovo nám. 96/I; 49°00′15″N 14°46′17″E | Karel Brady-Metzl was born in Třeboň on 28 May 1898, as the oldest son of Emilie and Ludwig Metzl. He had six siblings. His uncle and aunt Adolf and Karoline Brandt adopted two children Karel and Hedvika from Karolines' Sister Emilie, due to the incapability of having children themselves. In 1927 he married Markéta Dubská. The couple had a small retail business and a gas station in Nové Město na Moravě, where they were the only Jewish family. Karel and Markéta Brady-Metzl had two children - Jiří (born in 1928) and Hana (born on 31 May 1932). In 1939 Karel was denounced and arrested by the Gestapo. He was sent to prison in Jihlava for two months. In March 1941 Markéta was arrested and deported to Ravensbrück concentration camp. On 23 November 1941 Karel was arrested again. His children were brought to the Theresienstadt concentration camp in May 1942. Karel was transferred to Auschwitz concentration camp on 11 June 1942, where he was murdered on 14 July 1942. His wife Markéta was murdered on 29 October 1942 in Ravensbrück concentration camp. His thirteen-year-old daughter Hana was gassed immediately after her arrival at Auschwitz. In 2000, Hana's suitcase, containing her drawings, were found. The author Karen Levine told the story of the family in her book called 'Hana's Suitcase', which they produced a film of in 2009. |
| | HERE LIVED; FELIX METZL; BORN 1909; MURDERED 3.3.1945; IN DACHAU | Masarykovo nám. 96/I; 49°00′15″N 14°46′17″E | Felix Metzl was born in Třeboň on 13 April 1906 as a son of Emilie and Ludwig Metzl. He had five siblings and worked as a tradesman. On 18 April 1942 he was deported to Theresienstadt by Transport Akb, Nr. 751 from České Budějovice. From there, he was deported to Auschwitz on 1 October 1944 by Transport Emm, Nr. 254. He was murdered in Dachau concentration camp on 3 March 1945. |
| | HERE LIVED; VIKTOR METZL; BORN 1903; MURDERED 7.4.1945; IN MAUTHAUSEN | Masarykovo nám. 96/I; 49°00′15″N 14°46′17″E | Viktor Metzl was born on 13 January 1903 in Třeboň. He was a lawyer and he married Marie Vlasimska. The couple had two children – Alena (born in 1932) and Nora Metzl (born in 1934). On 4 October 1944 Victor was arrested, and he was murdered on 7 April 1945 in Mauthausen concentration camp. His wife was arrested in December 1944. When the war had finished, she returned home to her daughters. |

== Dates of collocations ==
The Stolpersteine in the Jihočeský kraj were collocated by the artist himself on the following dates:

- 6 June 2010: Třeboň
- 17 June 2013: Chlum u Třeboně
- 14 September 2014 or 6 October 2014: České Budějovice

== See also ==
- List of cities by country that have stolpersteine
- Stolpersteine in the Czech Republic
