= Stolpersteine in Zlín Region =

Memorial installation in Czech Republic

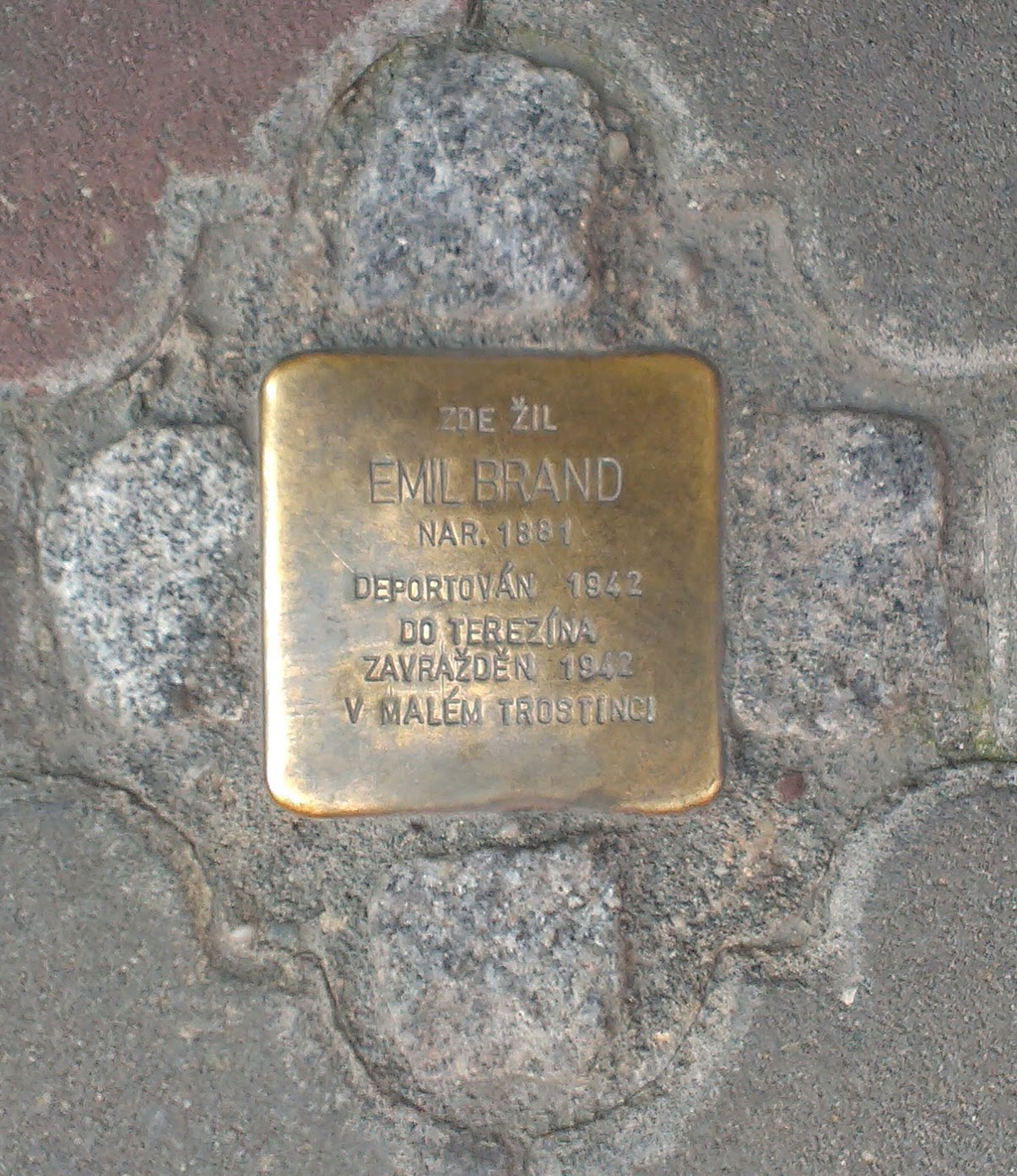
Stolperstein in Kroměříž

This article lists the Stolpersteine in the Zlín Region (Czech: Zlínský kraj) in the central-eastern part of Moravia. Stolpersteine is the German name for stumbling blocks collocated all over Europe by German artist Gunter Demnig. They remember the fate of the Nazi victims being murdered, deported, exiled or driven to suicide.

Generally, the stumbling blocks are posed in front of the building where the victims had their last self chosen residence. The name of the Stolpersteine in Czech is stolpersteine, or alternatively, kameny zmizelých, stones of the disappeared.

The lists are sortable; the basic order follows the alphabet according to the last name of the victim.

== Boršice ==
Stone	Inscription	Location	Life and death
	HERE LIVED; JOSEF SEIDLER; BORN 1897; DEPORTED 1943; TO AUSCHWITZ; MURDERED 1943	Boršice 170; 49°03′46″N 17°21′03″E	Josef Seidler and Matylda Seidlerová on a common monument in Boršice Josef Seidler was born on 10 August 1897. He married Matylda Seidlerová. The couple had at least one son, Valtr, born in 1926. On 23 January 1943, he, his wife and their son were deported from Uherské Hradiště to Theresienstadt concentration camp by transport Cn (his transport number was 941 of 1,003). From there, on 26 January 1943, the family were transferred to Auschwitz-Birkenau by transport of Cs, train Da 105 (his number on this transport was 794 of 1,000). There all three were murdered by the Nazi regime. The names Josef Seidler, Matylda Seidlerová and Vladimír Seidler are inscribed on a monument in Boršice.
	HERE LIVED; VALTR SEIDLER; BORN 1925; DEPORTED 1943; TO AUSCHWITZ; MURDERED 1943	Boršice 170; 49°03′46″N 17°21′03″E	Valtr Seidler was born on 26 September 1926. His parents were Josef Seidler and Matylda Seidlerová. On 23 January 1943, he and his parents were deported from Uherské Hradiště to Theresienstadt concentration camp by transport Cn (his transport number was 940 of 1,003). From there, on 26 January 1943, the family were transferred to Auschwitz-Birkenau by transport of Cs, train Da 105 (his number on this transport was 793 of 1,000). There all three were murdered by the Nazi regime. The names Josef Seidler, Matylda Seidlerová and Vladimír Seidler are inscribed on a monument in Boršice.
	HERE LIVED; MATYLDA; SEIDLEROVÁ; NÉE LÖWOVÁ; BORN 1888; DEPORTED 1943; TO AUSCHWITZ; MURDERED 1943	Boršice 170; 49°03′46″N 17°21′03″E	Matylda Seidlerová was born on 3 January 1888. She married Josef Seidler. The couple had at least one son, Valtr, born in 1926. On 23 January 1943, she, her husband Josef Seidler and her son Valtr Seidler were deported from Uherské Hradiště to Theresienstadt concentration camp by transport Cn (their transport number was 939). From there, on 26 January 1943, she, her husband and her son were transferred to Auschwitz-Birkenau by transport of Cs, train Da 105 (her number on this transport was 792). There all three were murdered by the Nazi regime. The names Josef Seidler, Matylda Seidlerová and Vladimír Seidler are inscribed on a monument in Boršice.

== Kroměříž ==
Stone	Inscription	Location	Life and death
	HERE LIVED; EMIL BRAND; BORN 1881; DEPORTED 1942; TO THERESIENSTADT; MURDERED 1942; IN MALY TROSTENETS	Vodní 56/11; 49°17′55″N 17°23′43″E	Emil Brand was born on 28 February 1881. His last residence before deportation was in Kroměříž, where he owned the Café Kavarna Brandova. After his brother-in-law Edward Kohn died in the First World War, he took care of his sister Elsa and her daughter Klara. On 30 June 1942, he was deported from Olomouc to Theresienstadt concentration camp by transport AAg (his number on this transport was 234). Elsa, Klara and her spouse were also deported to Theresienstadt a few days earlier. On 14 July 1942, Emil Brand was transferred to Maly Trostenets extermination camp with the transport AAx (his number on this transport was the 610). The transport included 1,000 people, 998 of them were murdered by the Nazi regime. One of the victims was Emil Brand. His niece Klara survived as the only one of the family and returned to Kroměříž. She married again, the family then moved to Canada and finally to the US, where she died in 2000.
	HERE LIVED; Dr. JOACHIM ASTEL; THE LAST RABBI IN KREMSIER; BORN 01/11/1901; MURDERED 1942; IN AUSCHWITZ	Moravcova 259; 49°17′54″N 17°23′49″E	Joachim Astel
	HERE LIVED; FRIMA ASTELOVÁ; NÉE MELZEROVÁ; BORN 06/11/1904; DEPORTED 30.6.1942; TO THERESIENSTADT; MURDERED 1944; IN AUSCHWITZ	Moravcova 259; 49°17′54″N 17°23′49″E	Frima Astelová
	HERE LIVED; JONATHAN ASTEL; BORN 18.06.1931; DEPORTED 30.6.1942; TO THERESIENSTADT; MURDERED 1944; IN AUSCHWITZ	Moravcova 259; 49°17′54″N 17°23′49″E	Jonathan Astel
	HERE LIVED; SCHMARJAHU ASTEL; BORN 10.10.1935; DEPORTED 30.6.1942; TO THERESIENSTADT; MURDERED 1944; IN AUSCHWITZ	Moravcova 259; 49°17′54″N 17°23′49″E	Schmarjahu Astel
	HERE LIVED; MUDr. FELIX PRESSER; BORN 06/11/1899; ARRESTED 01.09.1939; MURDERED 24.2.1940; IN BUCHENWALD	Kollárova 528/1; 49°17′45″N 17°23′31″E	Felix Presser Felix Presser at the joint memorial of Kroměříž doctors
	HERE LIVED; BEDŘIŠKA PRESSEROVÁ; BORN 31/05/1907; NÉE SCHWARZ; DEPORTED 30.6.1942; TO THERESIENSTADT; MURDERED 1942; IN MALY TROSTINEC	Kollárova 528/1; 49°17′45″N 17°23′31″E	Bedriska Presser
	HERE LIVED; PETR PRESSER; BORN 15/04/1930; DEPORTED 30.6.1942; TO THERESIENSTADT; MURDERED 1942; IN MALY TROSTINEC	Kollárova 528/1; 49°17′45″N 17°23′31″E	Petr Presser
	HERE LIVED; TOMÁŠ PRESSER; BORN 06/03/1938; DEPORTED 30.6.1942; TO THERESIENSTADT; MURDERED 1942; IN MALY TROSTINEC	Kollárova 528/1; 49°17′45″N 17°23′31″E	Tomas Presser

== Dates of collocations ==
The Stolpersteine in the Zlínský kraj were collocated by the artist himself on the following dates:

- 18 July 2013: Boršice
- 16 September 2014: Kroměříž
- 6 November 2017: Kroměříž, the family of rabbi Joachim Astel
- 16 April 2019: Kroměříž, the family of Felix Presser

== See also ==
- List of places with Stolpersteine
- Stolpersteine in the Czech Republic
