= Stolpersteine in Říčany =

Memorial installations in Czech Republic

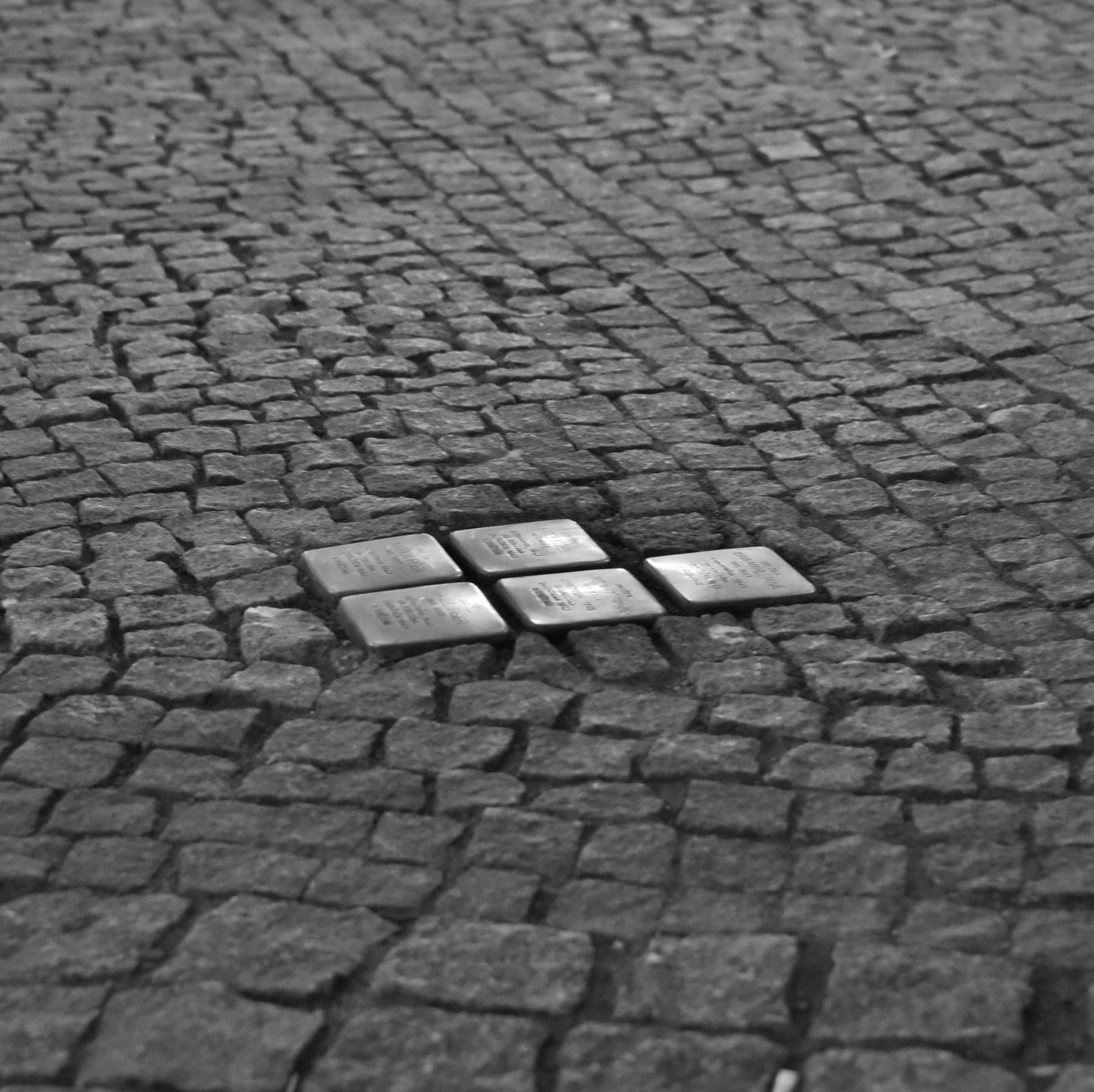
The first Stolpersteine in Říčany commemorate Family Fišer.

This article lists the Stolpersteine in the town of Říčany. Stolpersteine is the German name for stumbling blocks collocated all over Europe by German artist, Gunter Demnig. The blocks commemorate the Nazi victims that were murdered, deported, exiled, or driven to suicide.

Generally, the stumbling blocks are posed in front of the building where the victims had their last self-chosen residence. The name of the Stolpersteine in Czech is: Kameny zmizelých, stones of the disappeared.

== Stolpersteine ==
In 1930, 38 Jewish people lived in the city.

After the occupation of Czechoslovakia by German troops in 1939, Jewish shops in Říčany were "aryanized". Starting in 1942, deportations were carried out. Around 50 people were deported. A plaque in Říčany commemorates 42 of them. The focus of the arrest wave was on nine houses on Masaryk Square and Lázeňská Street. From there, Nazi troops deported 22 women, men and children, including the whole family Fišer, with the 91-year-old Anna Mahlerová. Only three deportees from Říčany could survive the Shoah.

The lists are sortable; the basic order follows the alphabet according to the last name of the victim.

Stone	Inscription	Location	Life and death
	HERE LIVED; KAREL FIŠER; BORN 1895; DEPORTED 1943; TO THERESIENSTADT; MURDERED 6.9.1943; IN AUSCHWITZ	Masarykovo náměstí 7; 49.991485°N 14.654789°E	Karel Fišer was born on 11 August 1895. He ran a textile business on Masaryk Square and married Kamila née Mahlerová (see below). The couple had two sons: Jindřich and Pavel (both below). His wife's grandmother, Anna Mahlerová, lived with them. His family was deported on 10 August 1942 from Prague by transport Ba to the Theresienstadt concentration camp. Because of sickness, he himself was deported later on 22 March 1943 from Prague by transport Cx to Theresienstadt (his transport number was 31), where his wife and sons were. On 6 September 1943, the couple were deported with the two sons to Auschwitz concentration camp. Karel Fišers transport number was 3348. There, all were murdered by the Nazi regime on the day of arriving in Auschwitz. Anna Mahlerová was murdered in the Treblinka extermination camp in October 1942.
	HERE LIVED; JINDŘICH FIŠER; BORN 1927; DEPORTED 1942; TO THERESIENSTADT; MURDERED 6.9.1943; IN AUSCHWITZ	Masarykovo náměstí 7; 49.991485°N 14.654789°E	Jindřich Fišer was born on 26 July 1927 as the son of Karel Fišer (see above) and Kamila Fišerová (see below). He had a younger brother, Pavel (see below). The father ran a textile shop in the square. Jindřich Fišer, his brother, his mother and the great-grandmother, Anna Mahlerová, were deported on 10 August 1942 from Prague to Theresienstadt concentration camp by transport Ba. His transport number was 1372. His father was deported in March 1943, also to Theresienstadt. On 6 September 1943, Jindřich Fišer, his parents and the brother were deported to Auschwitz concentration camp. His transport number was 3227. There, all were murdered by the Nazi regime on the day of arriving in Auschwitz.
	HERE LIVED; PAVEL FIŠER; BORN 1932; DEPORTED 1942; TO THERESIENSTADT; MURDERED 6.9.1943; IN AUSCHWITZ	Masarykovo náměstí 7; 49.991485°N 14.654789°E	Pavel Fišer was born on 18 July 1932 as the son of Karel Fišer (see above) and Kamila Fišerová (see below). He had an older brother, Jindřich (see above). The father ran a textile shop in the square. Pavel Fišer, his brother, his mother and the great-grandmother, Anna Mahlerová, were deported on 10 August 1942 from Prague to Theresienstadt concentration camp by transport Ba. His transport number was 137. His father was deported in March 1943, also to Theresienstadt. On 6 September 1943, Pavel Fišer, his parents and the brother were deported to Auschwitz concentration camp. His transport number was 3347. There, all were murdered by the Nazi regime on the day of arriving in Auschwitz.
	HERE LIVED; KAMILA FIŠEROVÀ; BORN 1904; DEPORTED 1942; TO THERESIENSTADT; MURDERED 6.9.1943; IN AUSCHWITZ	Masarykovo náměstí 7; 49.991485°N 14.654789°E	Kamila Fišerová was born on 23 April 1904. She was married to Karel Fišer, a merchant of textiles (see above). The couple had two sons, Jindřich and Pavel (both above). Anna Mahlerová, her grandmother, lived with the family. Kamila Fišerová, her sons and her grandmother were deported on 10 August 1942 from Prague to Theresienstadt concentration camp by transport Ba. Kamila Fišerová's transport number was 1373. In March 1943, her husband arrived in Theresienstadt. On 6 September 1943, the couple Fišer/Fišerová and their sons were deported to Auschwitz concentration camp. Kamila Fišerová's transport number was 3226. There, all were murdered by the Nazi regime on the day of arriving in Auschwitz.
	HERE LIVED; ANNA MAHLEROVÁ; BORN 1851; DEPORTED 1942; TO THERESIENSTADT; MURDERED 19.10.1942; IN TREBLINKA	Masarykovo náměstí 7; 49.991485°N 14.654789°E	Anna Mahlerová was born on 4 December 1851 in Pravonin. From 1929 to 1938, she lived with her son in Podbořany. On 3 October 1938, during the Nazi occupation of Sudetenland, she fled to Říčany. Thereafter, she lived with her granddaughter, Kamila Fišerová (see above) and her family. Together, with most of the family members, she was arrested and deported on 10 August 1942 from Prague to Theresienstadt concentration camp by transport Ba. Her transport number was 1374. In the same year, on 19 October 1942, she was deported from Theresienstadt to Treblinka extermination camp with transport Bw. Her transport number was 998. There she was murdered by the Nazi regime. Also, her son Alfred, her grandson Ota, several nieces and grandnieces were all murdered in Auschwitz.

== Dates of collocations ==
The Stolpersteine in Říčany were collocated by the artist himself on 19 September 2017.

== See also ==
- List of places with Stolpersteine
