= Stolpersteine in Weingarten =

Memorial installation in Germany

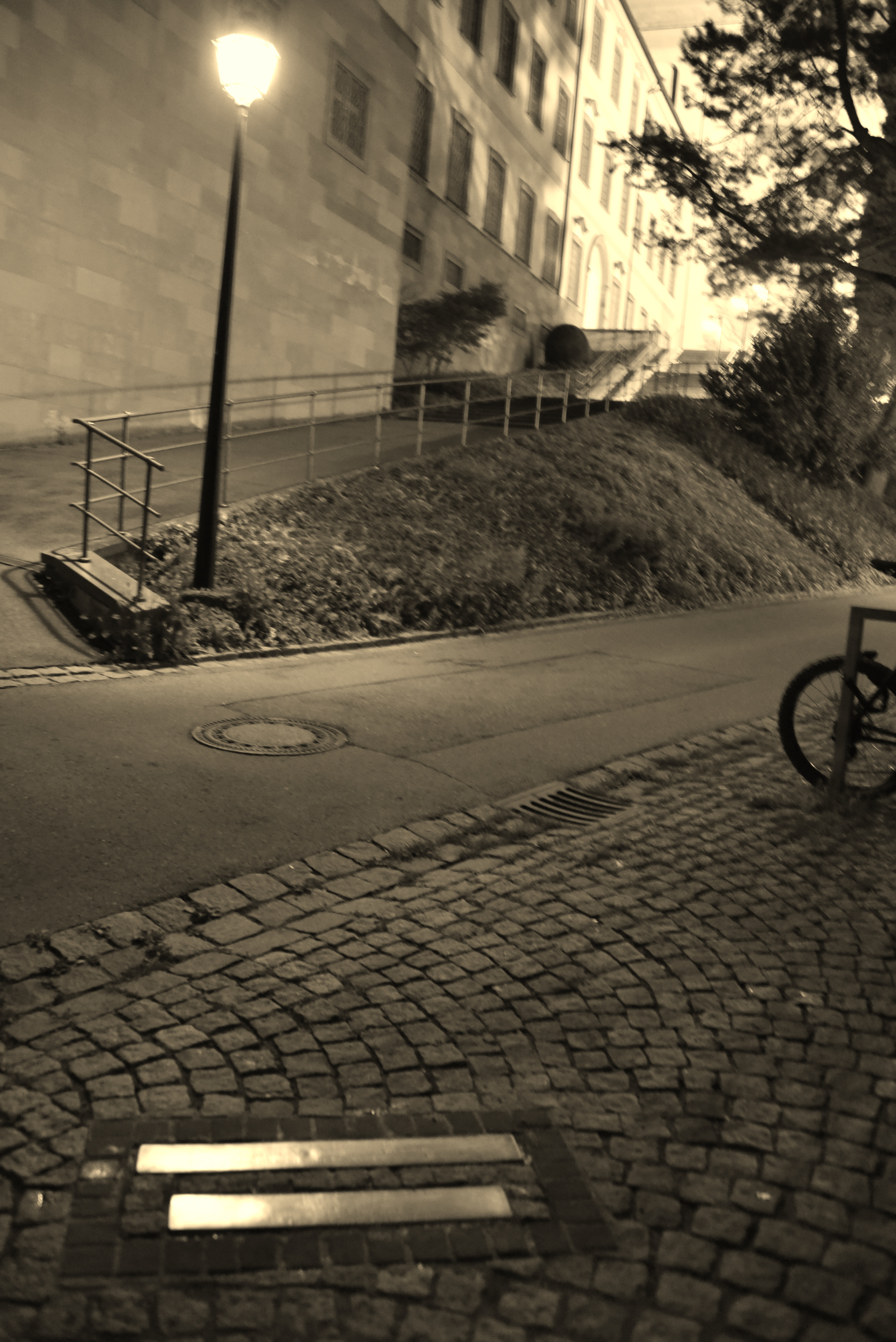
Stolperschwellen in Weingarten

This article lists the Stolpersteine that have been collocated in Weingarten in the very south of Germany. Stolpersteine is the German name for stumbling blocks collocated all over Europe by German artist Gunter Demnig. They remember the fate of the Nazi victims being murdered, deported, exiled or driven to suicide.

Generally, the stumbling blocks are posed in front of the building where the victims had their last self chosen residence. Stolperschwellen are much larger and they usually remember a group of victims.

== Stolperschwellen ==
Image	Location	Dedication
	Abteistraße 5	FORCED LABOUR IN WEINGARTEN 1942 TO 1945; 1135 MALE AND FEMALE FORCED LABOURERS; IN THE, RUSSIAN CAMP'" IN ABTEISTR. 5; 166 MEN — 126 WOMEN; 156 DEAD PERSONS FROM EASTERN EUROPE LAY BURIED IN THE GRAVE YARD
	Abteistraße 5	INSIDE THIS BASILICA WITH ITS RELIC OF THE PASSION HUMANS HAVE SUFFERED AND DIED; LORD HAVE MERCY ON US AND BESTOW TO THE DECEASED; FREEDOM IN YOUR ETERNAL PLACES

== Stolperstein ==
Stone	Inscription	Location	Life and death
	HERE LIVED; JOACHIM BRUNNER; BORN 1884; IN RESISTANCE; ARRESTED 1943 'DEMORALIZATION OF THE TROOPS'; WELZHEIM; 1944 DACHAU; MURDERED 1945; MAUTHAUSEN	Wilhelmstraße 30; 47°48′26″N 9°38′39″E	Joachim Brunner was born in 1884. He originated from Bad Waldsee in the district Ravensburg. In 1912 he moved to Weingarten. He was trained as an ironworker but worked as a peddler. First he travelled with a bike, later on with a moped. He came around, knew a lot of people, discussed the state of the nation and exchanged news with other citizens critical to the Nazi regime. He was accused of undermining military morale and was arrested in 1943, kept imprisoned in Welzheim, deported to Dachau concentration camp in 1944 and murdered in Mauthausen concentration camp on 12 March 1945. Eight weeks later the Nazi regime perished.

== Date of collocations ==
The Stolperschwellen and the Stolperstein of Weingarten were collocated by the artist himself on 17 April 2013.

== See also ==
- List of places with Stolpersteine
- Stolpersteine in Germany
