= List of places with Stolpersteine =

Overview of countries where Stolpersteine have been installed

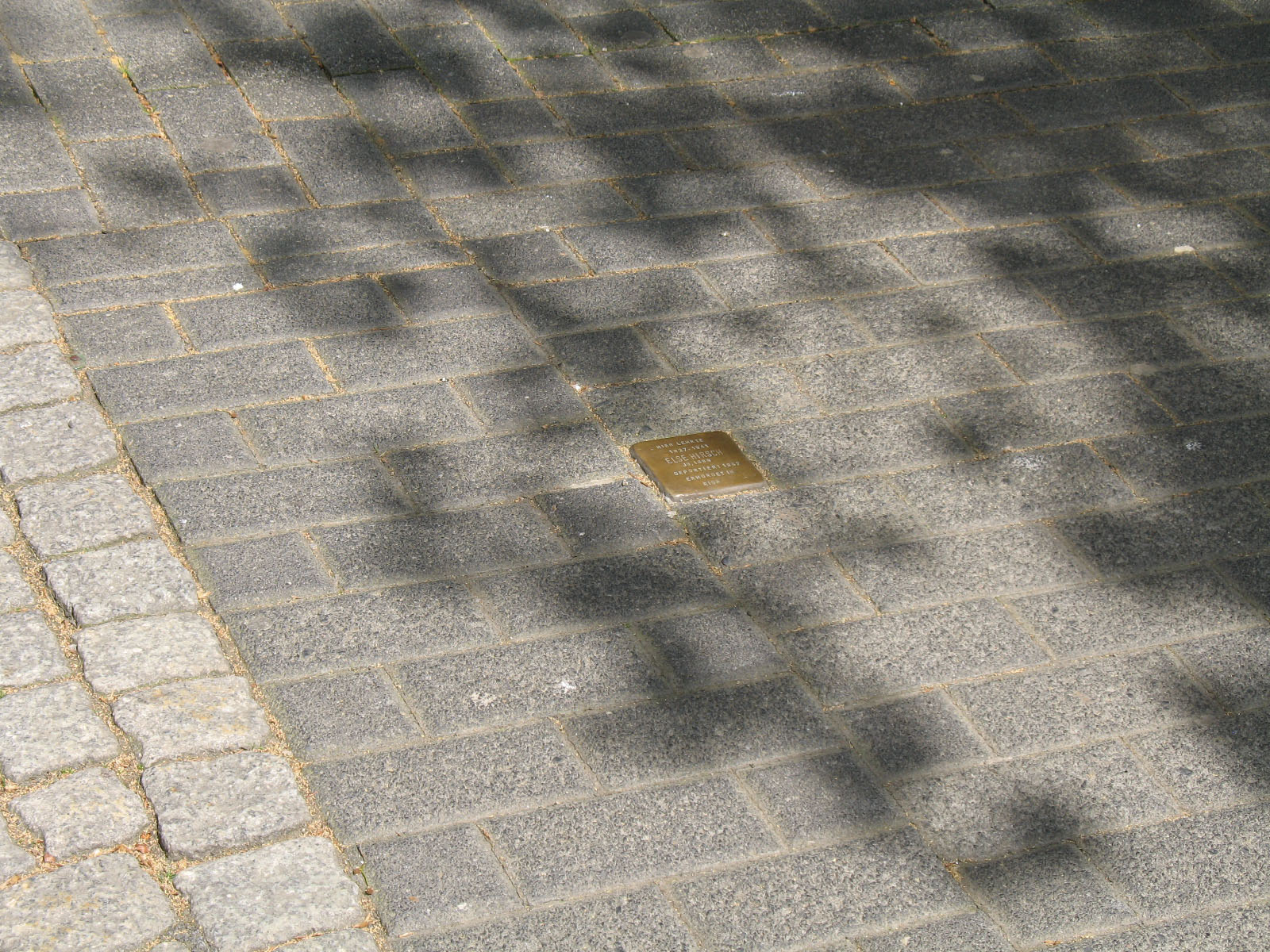
Stolperstein on sidewalk in Bochum

This is an incomplete list of the roughly 1,000 cities and towns that have Stolpersteine. It is organized in alphabetical order and by country. Where the number of Stolpersteine is known or can be approximated, that information has been included, along with the first installation date, if known. Where the number of people deported by the Nazis is known, that information is included for comparison to the number of Stolpersteine in that city. For a more complete and up-to-date list, see German: Liste der Orte mit Stolpersteinen.

By December 2013, the project had installed more than 43,500 memorials in approximately 1,000 cities and towns. As of 20 August 2014 over 48,000 Stolpersteine had been laid in 18 European countries, making the project the world's largest memorial and on 11 January 2015 Stolperstein 50,000 was installed in Turin, Italy for Eleonora Levi. By May 2018 almost 69,000 Stolpersteine had been installed in 21 countries, and on 23 October 2018, Stolperstein No. 70,000 was installed in Frankfurt, Germany for Willy Zimmerer. The 100,000th Stolperstein was installed in Feuchtwangen near Nuremberg in May 2023; by August 2024 over 107,000 Stolpersteine had been installed in nearly 1,900 communities.

A Stolperschwelle is a larger version of a Stolperstein, installed "in places where hundreds or perhaps even thousands of Stolpersteine would need to be installed, but where space is insufficient or the sheer number would be overwhelming".

== Austria ==
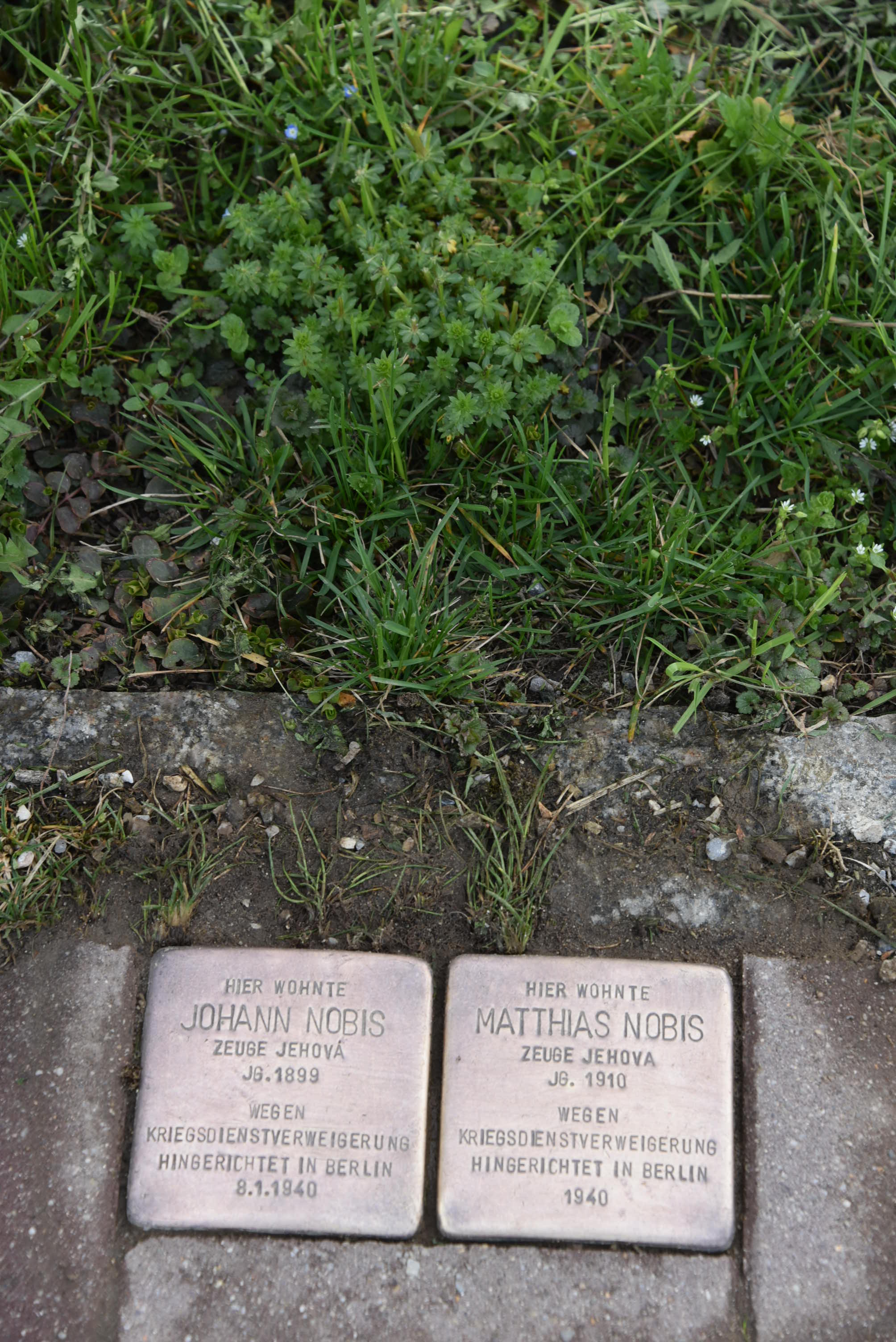
The first Stolpersteine in Austria, dedicated to the conscientious objectors Johann and Matthias Nobis

- Carinthia:
  - Klagenfurt (24 Stolpersteine)
- Lower Austria:
  - Bad Erlach (2)
  - Hinterbrühl (2)
  - Krems an der Donau (1)
  - Mödling (near Vienna): 22 Stolpersteine, as of August 2006
  - Neunkirchen (34)
  - Wiener Neustadt (more than 100)
- Salzburg (state)
  - Anif (1)
  - Hallein (40)
  - Salzburg: at least 519 Stolpersteine, as of May 2025; see Salzburg Stolpersteine for an interactive map with links to lists of Stolpersteine by type.
  - Sankt Georgen bei Salzburg (2), the first Stolpersteine in Austria and the first ones being officially admitted by a municipal administration worldwide
  - St. Johann im Pongau (8)
- Styria:
  - Graz (94)
  - Leoben (10)
- Upper Austria
  - Aigen-Schlägl (4)
  - Altheim (1)
  - Braunau am Inn (Adolf Hitler's birthplace): first Stolpersteine laid on 11 August 2006 (2) (see also Stolpersteine in the district of Braunau am Inn)
  - Hochburg-Ach (1)
  - Maria Schmolln (1)
  - Moosdorf (2)
  - St. Radegund (1)
  - Sankt Veit im Innkreis (1)
  - Wels (6)
- Vorarlberg:
  - Hohenems (9)
  - Lingenau (7)
- Vienna

There are many Stolpersteine in Vienna. At least two organisations with their own databank (incl. a map) promote the implementation of Stolpersteine in Vienna.

== Belgium ==
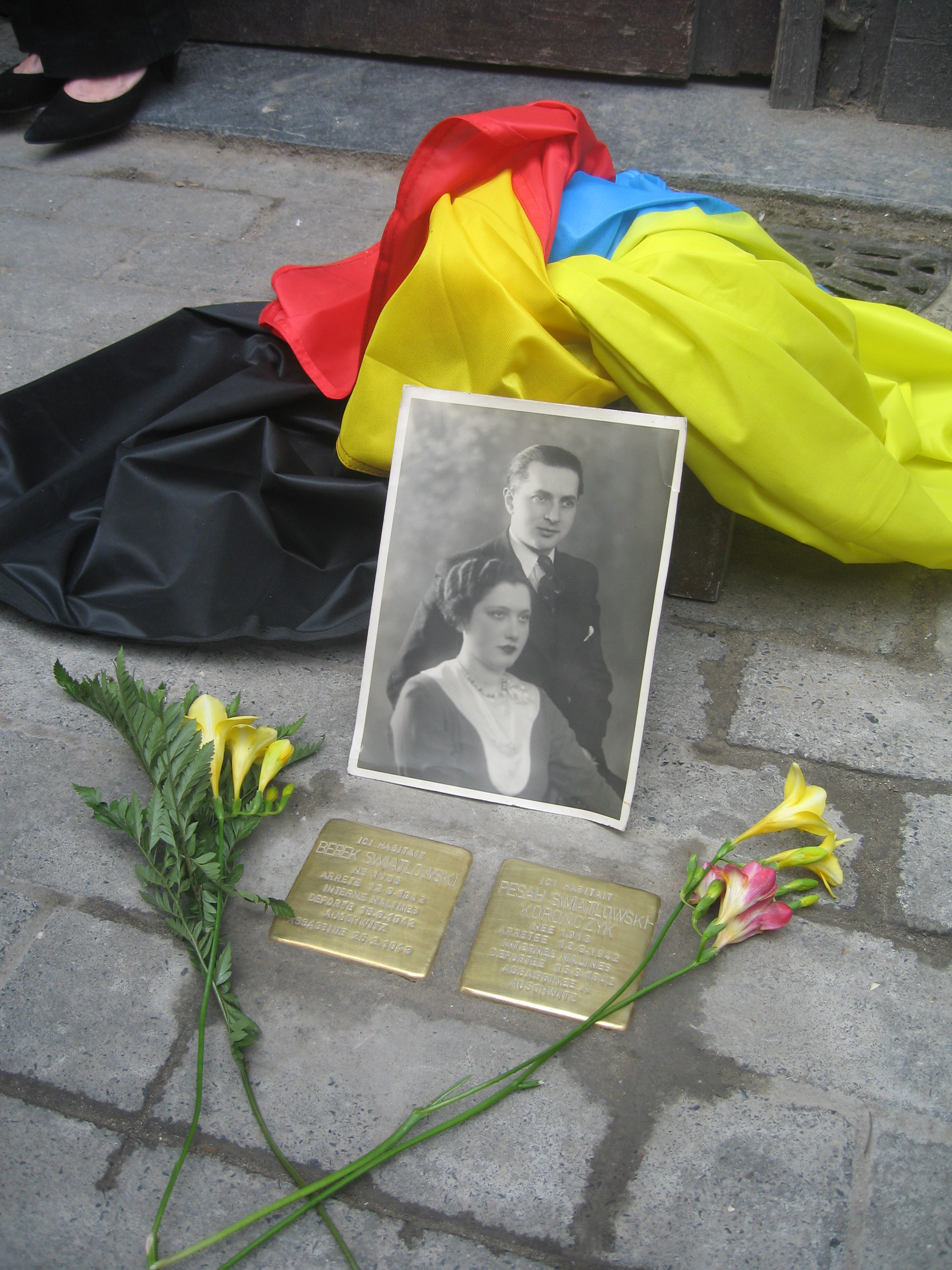
Stolpersteine in Brussels

- Brussels: first pavés de mémoire (French for Stolpersteine) installed on 13 May 2009, the first Stolpersteine in Belgium (about 150 Stolpersteine)
- Antwerp (3)
- Charleroi (11), see: Stolpersteine in Charleroi
- Eupen (5)
- Ghent (4)
- Leuven (Stolperschwelle and several Stolpersteine)
- Liege (13)
- Mol (2)
- Sint-Truiden (11)

== Bosnia and Herzegovina ==
- Mostar
- Sarajevo, first 6 Stolpersteine in Bosnia and Herzegovina were laid in Sarajevo on 29 April 2024.

== Channel Islands ==
- Jersey, 45 stones
- Guernsey, 15 stones

== Croatia ==
- Rijeka: The first 4 Stolpersteine in Croatia were laid in Rijeka on 13 May 2013. (see: Stolpersteine in Croatia)

== Czech Republic ==
- Brno
- Kolín
- Neratovice
- Olomouc
- Ostrava
- Prague: first 10 Stolpersteine laid in 2008, see lists of Stolpersteine in: Josefov, Malá Strana, Vršovice and Modřany
- Říčany

Regions:

- Stolpersteine in the Středočeský kraj: Beroun (8)
- Jihočeský kraj: České Budějovice (1), Chlum u Třeboně (2), Třeboň (3)
- Karlovarský kraj: Chodov (9)
- Královéhradecký kraj: Kostelec and Orlicí (1), Náchod (5)
- Ústecký kraj: Děčín (1), Teplice (13), Žatec (3)
- Kraj Vysočina: Chotěboř (3), Havlíčkův Brod (2), Pacov (4), Senožaty (4), Třebíč (3)
- Zlínský kraj: Boršice (3), Kroměříž (9)

== Denmark ==
- The first 12 stones were laid in Copenhagen on 10 June 2019. In Nørregade 27, Krystalgade, Bredgade, Sølvgade, Ravnsborg Tværgade, Prinsessegade, Rantzausgade, Carl Plougs Vej and Borgmestervangen.
- In Odense 10 stones were laid on 8 August 2021 and two stones on 9 June 2022 on Buchwaldsgade, Kirkesvinget, Kochsgade, Ingrids Allé, Hunderupvej, Flakhaven, Ny Kongevej, Bangs Alle, Chr. IX's Vej, Prinsesse Maries Allé, Store Glasvej and Hjallesevej.
- In Assens two stones were laid on 8 June 2022.
- In Svendborg three stones were laid on 12 August 2022.
- In Nyborg, Demark/Nyborg four stones were laid on 4 May 2024 on Vindingevej 36, Skippergade 12, Frisengårdsvej 73 and Fjordvej 19.

== Finland ==
- Helsinki: 7, as of June 2021
- Turku: 1, as of 2022

== France ==
- L'Aiguillon-sur-Mer
- Beaulieu-sous-la-Roche
- Bègles
- Bordeaux
- Bourneau
- Cartelègue: August, 2015.
- Coux par Montendre: The first stone in France for a Prisoner of War who died in Germany, laid in August 2015.
- Cluny
- Fontaines
- Fontenay-le-Comte: The first two stones in France were laid in Saint-Médard-des-Prés on 30 September 2013.
- Fontenay-sous-Bois: April, 2019
- Herrlisheim-près-Colmar: April, 2019
- La Brède: August, 2015.
- Le Grand-Village-Plage: August, 2015
- Libourne: April, 2019
- Longèves
- Mervent
- Muttersholtz: April, 2019
- Nieul-sur-l'Autise
- Saint-Malo: May 2023
- Strasbourg: The first 20 stones were laid on 1 May 2019.
- Saint-Brieuc: Sixteen stones Avril 2025

== Germany ==
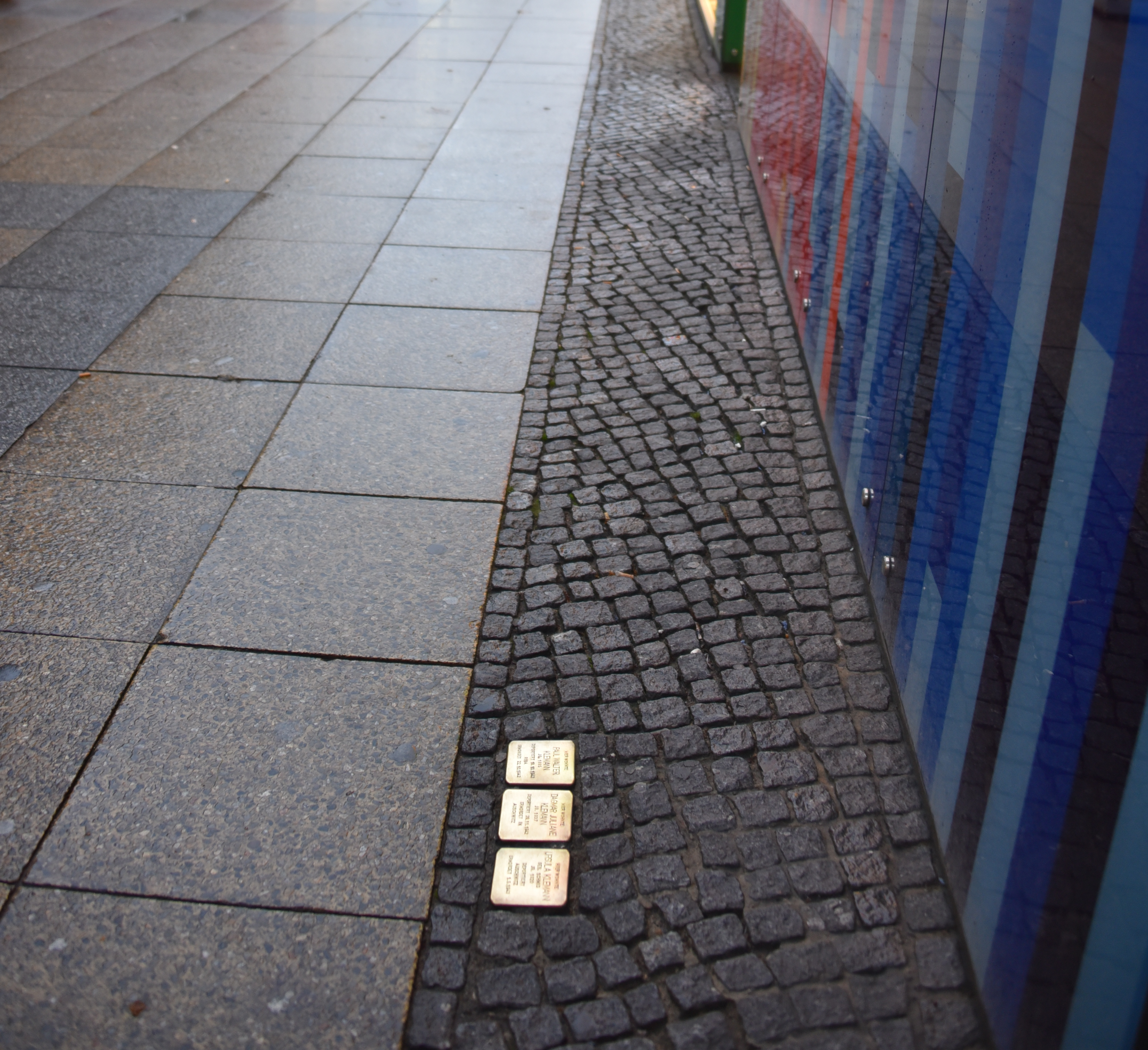
Stolpersteine in Berlin-Schöneberg

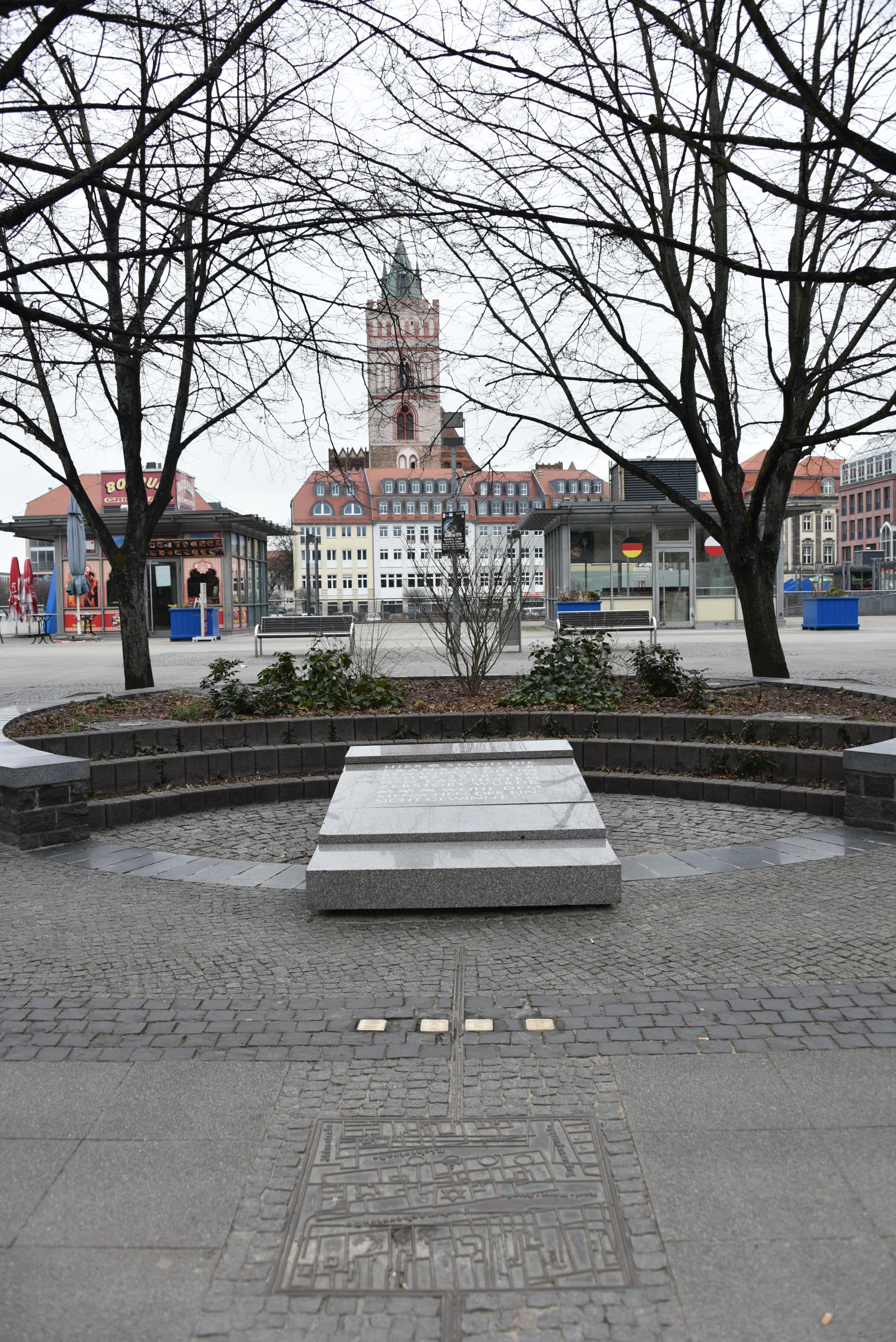
Four Stolpersteine in Frankfurt (Oder)

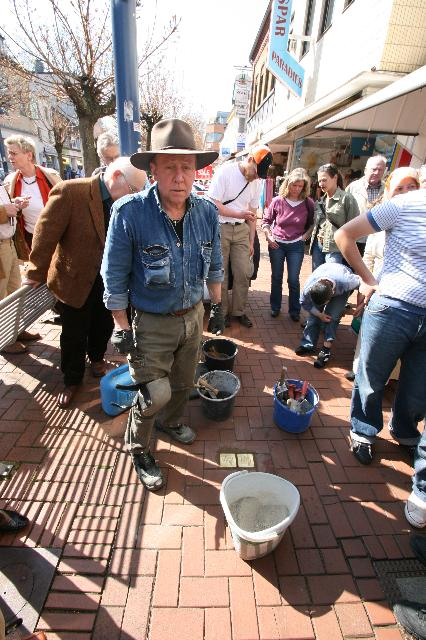
Gunter Demnig placing Stolpersteine on the main road in Frechen, 3 April 2009

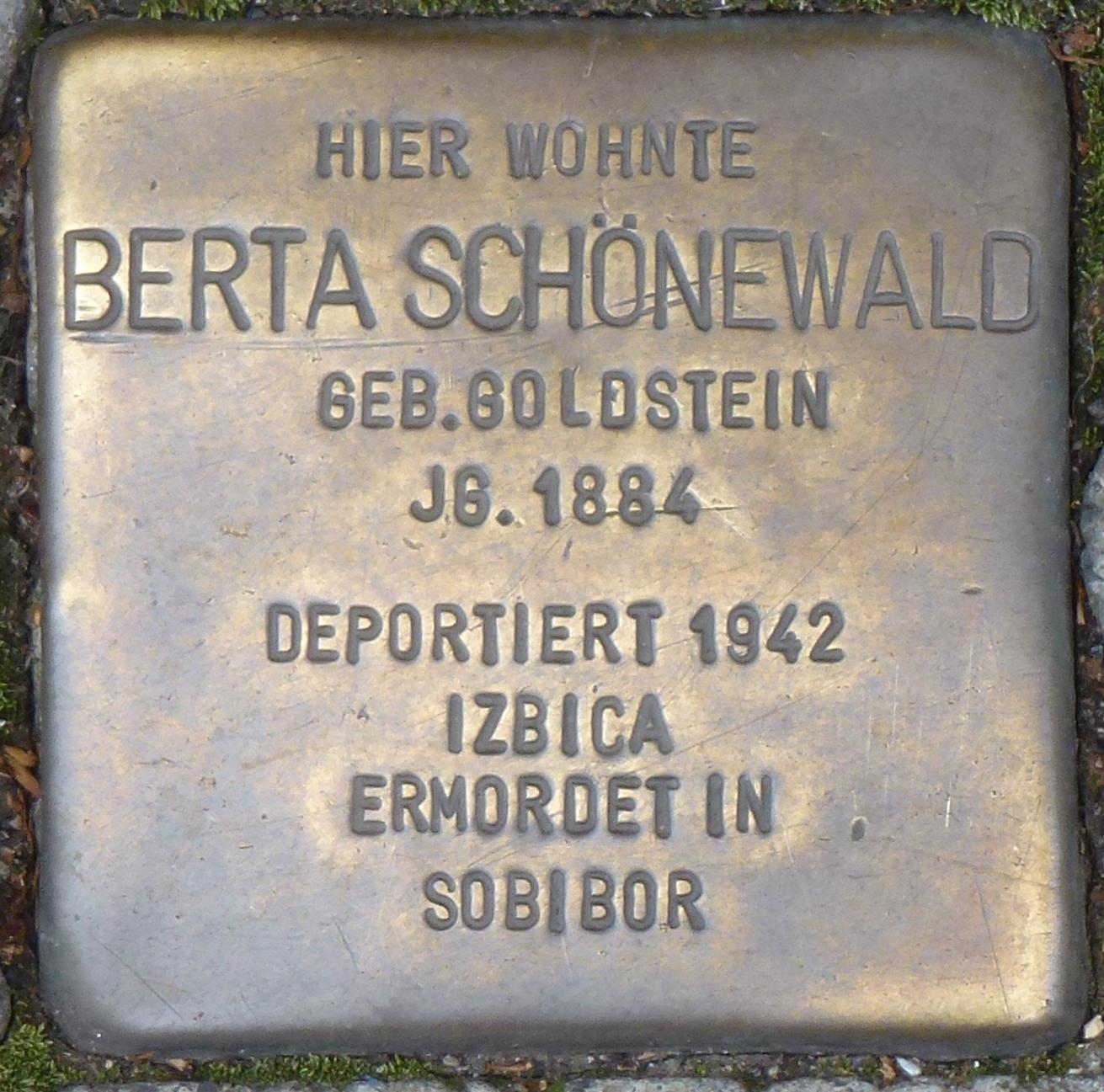
One of at least 87 Stolpersteine in Koblenz; this one is for Berta Schönewald

- Aachen: see also List of Stolpersteine in Aachen
- Ahaus
- Altenbeken
- Alzey
- Andernach: 20 Stolpersteine
- Ansbach
- Apolda: 28 Stolpersteine; first memorials laid in May 2008
- Arnsberg
- Arnstadt
- Aschaffenburg
- Aschersleben
- Aßlar
- Attendorn
- Aub: 20 as of January 2010
- Aue
- Bad Berleburg: 44 Stolpersteine, as of May 2013
- Bad Bentheim
- Bad Hersfeld
- Bad Homburg vor der Höhe: see also List of Stolpersteine in Bad Homburg
- Bad Kissingen
- Bad Laasphe: 83 Stolpersteine, as of May 2013
- Bad Langensalza
- Bad Neuenahr-Ahrweiler: see also List of Stolpersteine in Bad Neuenahr-Ahrweiler
- Bad Saarow
- Bad Salzuflen: see also List of Stolpersteine in Bad Salzuflen
- Bad Vilbel
- Bad Wildungen
- Bad Wimpfen
- Bad Zwesten
- Baden-Baden: 114 Stolpersteine as of November 2013; see also List of Stolpersteine in Baden-Baden
- Badenweiler
- Bamberg
- Bargteheide: one Stolperstein as of November, 2009
- Barsinghausen
- Bautzen
- Beckum
- Bergisch Gladbach
- Berlin: over 10,000 Stolpersteine as of February 2025; 55,000 people deported;
- Beverungen
- Bielefeld
- Bingen am Rhein
- Bocholt: 44 Stolpersteine as of December 2009
- Bochum: 179 Stolpersteine in 88 locations see also List of Stolpersteine in Bochum
- Bodenheim
- Bonn: over 100 Stolpersteine
- Bornheim (Frankfurt am Main)
- Borken, North Rhine-Westphalia: 2 Stolpersteine laid on 25 February 2011
- Bottrop
- Braunschweig
- Bremen: see also List of Stolpersteine in Bremen
- Bremerhaven: see also List of Stolpersteine in Bremerhaven
- Bretten (near Karlsruhe)
- Bruchsal
- Bückeburg
- Bünde
- Burgdorf
- Burgkunstadt
- Burgsteinfurt
- Butzbach
- Castrop-Rauxel: 29 Stolpersteine as of May 2013 laid in 5 locations. see also List of Stolpersteine in Castrop-Rauxel
- Celle
- Chemnitz
- Coburg
- Cologne: 1,400 Stolpersteine, first memorials laid in 2005
- Cottbus: 77 Stolpersteine as of December 2013, see also List of Stolpersteine in Cottbus
- Crimmitschau: 9 Stolpersteine, see also List of Stolpersteine in Crimmitschau
- Dachau: 6 Stolpersteine laid in November 2005
- Darmstadt
- Delitzsch
- Dietzenbach
- Dinkelsbühl
- Dirmstein: 10 Stolpersteine laid in March 2009, one for a British airman murdered by a local official
- Döbeln: 5 Stolpersteine laid in May 2007
- Dormagen
- Dortmund: 147 Stolpersteine, as of June 2009
- Dreieich
- Dresden: 34 Stolpersteine, as of October 2013; see also List of Stolpersteine in Dresden
- Duderstadt
- Duisburg: 225 Stolpersteine, as of 2009
- Düren
- Düsseldorf
- Eberswalde
- Edermünde
- Eichstetten
- Eisenach
- Eisenberg, Thuringia
- Eislingen
- Erftstadt
- Erkrath
- Erlangen
- Eschwege
- Essen: over 170 Stolpersteine, first memorials laid in 2004
- Esslingen
- Estenfeld
- Ettlingen
- Falkenberg: 5 Stolpersteine as of June 2025
- Falkensee: 48 Stolpersteine as of February 2025
- Flensburg
- Frankenthal
- Frankfurt am Main: over 500 Stolpersteine; over 12,000 Jews deported from Frankfurt
- Frankfurt (Oder): first 7 Stolpersteine placed on 8 May 2006
- Frechen: 31 Stolpersteine placed in April 2009, and December 2009 with the placement of another 19 Stolpersteine planned for December 2010.
- Freiburg im Breisgau: 270 Stolpersteine as of 2002
- Freising
- Friedrichroda
- Friedrichsdorf
- Gaggenau: 14 Stolpersteine
- Gau-Algesheim
- Gaukönigshofen
- Gelnhausen
- Gelsenkirchen: first Stolpersteine placed on 13 July 2009
- Gera
- Gerlingen
- Gernsbach ; see also List of Stolpersteine in Gernsbach
- Giessen: 126 Stolpersteine at 46 places as of August 2013; see also List of Stolpersteine in Giessen
- Gladbeck
- Göppingen: 31 Stolpersteine
- Gotha
- Greifswald: 11 Stolpersteine, all missing since their theft on the 2012 anniversary of Kristallnacht
- Grevenbroich: 3 Stolpersteine; see also List of Stolpersteine in Grevenbroich
- Griesheim
- Grimma
- Gröbenzell: 1 Stolperstein, placed 22 March 2012
- Großschweidnitz
- Gudensberg
- Gütersloh
- Haan
- Hachenburg: 42 Stolpersteine, all Jewish victims, completed in August 2013
- Hagen
- Halle (Saale): 130 Stolpersteine, as of August 2009; see also List of Stolpersteine in Halle (Saale)
- Hamburg, see also List of Stolpersteine in Hamburg-Eppendorf: 5,536 Stolpersteine, as of February 2019; 10,000 Jews deported between 1941 and 1945
- Hamm
- Hanover, see also List of Stolpersteine in Hanover
- Haselünne
- Hattingen: 11 Stolpersteine in eight locations placed 13 December 2005
- Havixbeck
- Heide
- Heidelberg
- Heidenheim an der Brenz
- Heilbronn
- Hemsbach
- Herborn
- Herdecke
- Hermaringen
- Herzlake: 5 Stolpersteine laid for the Meyer family on 25 August 2011
- Herzogenrath
- Hiddensee: 6 Stolpersteine; see also List of Stolpersteine in Hiddensee
- Hilchenbach: 12 Stolpersteine as of May 2013
- Hildburghausen
- Hilden: 42 Stolpersteine; first memorials placed on 24 November 2004
- Hildesheim
- Hochheim am Main
- Hofheim am Taunus
- Homberg (Efze)
- Höxter
- Hoya: 18 Stolpersteine; first 3 memorials placed in 2007
- Huenfeld
- Ilmenau
- Ingelheim
- Ingolstadt: 11 Stolpersteine, placed 21 March 2012
- Irsee: 3 Stolpersteine
- Iserlohn
- Itzehoe
- Jena
- Joachimsthal, Brandenburg: 2 Stolpersteine as of July 2007
- Kalkar
- Kall: 23 Stolpersteine, all placed on 31 August 2012
- Kamen
- Kappeln
- Karlsruhe: over 140 Stolpersteine; first memorials placed on 18 March 2005 (Map of Karlsruhe showing Stolperstein locations)
- Karlstadt
- Katzwinkel: 1 Stolperstein
- Kehl: 22 Stolpersteine
- Kempten: 22 Stolpersteine, as of early 2012; see also List of Stolpersteine in Kempten
- Kenzingen
- Kiel: 144 Stolpersteine; see also List of Stolpersteine in Kiel
- Kippenheim: 16 Stolpersteine; see also Stolpersteine in Kiel
- Kirchheim unter Teck
- Kitzingen
- Kleinblittersdorf
- Klingenmünster
- Koblenz: 87 Stolpersteine, as of 9 July 2012
- Köln
- Königswinter (Oberdollendorf)
- Köthen (Anhalt) 17 Stolpersteine at 7 addresses, see also List of Stolpersteine in Köthen (Anhalt)
- Konstanz: 138 Stolpersteine, as of September 2013; see also List of Stolpersteine in Konstanz
- Krefeld see also Liste der Stolpersteine in Krefeld
- Kreuztal, including suburb Littfeld: 12 Stolpersteine, as of May 2013
- Kronberg im Taunus
- Kronshagen: 2 Stolpersteine; see also List of Stolpersteine in Kronshagen
- Künzelsau
- Kusel
- Ladenburg
- Lahnstein
- Lahr
- Lechenich (Ward of Erftstadt): 3 Stolpersteine
- Leichlingen
- Leipzig
- Lennestadt
- Leverkusen
- Limbach-Oberfrohna: 7 Stolpersteine, see also List of Stolpersteine in Limbach-Oberfrohna
- Lindenberg im Allgäu
- Lindow
- Lörrach: 15 Stolpersteine, see also Liste der Stolpersteine in Lörrach
- Lübeck: see also List of Stolpersteine in Lübeck
- Luckenwalde
- Ludwigsburg: over 12 Stolpersteine; first 12 as of 2008
- Ludwigshafen
- Lüneburg: 47 Stolpersteine
- Lünen: 4 Stolpersteine, as of September 2009
- Lutherstadt Wittenberg: 12 Stolpersteine as of the end of 2012
- Magdeburg: over 70 Stolpersteine; first 13 installed on 13 March 2007
- Mainbernheim
- Maintal
- Mainz: see also List of Stolpersteine in Mainz
- Mannheim: 44 Stolpersteine, as of May 2009
- Marbach am Neckar: 1 Stolperstein, as of November 2014
- Marburg: 26 Stolpersteine, as of September 2011
- Marktbreit
- Markkleeberg
- Meerane: 5 Stolpersteine, see also List of Stolpersteine in Meerane
- Meiningen
- Melsungen
- Meppen
- Merseburg: 7 Stolpersteine; see also List of Stolpersteine in Merseburg
- Meschede: 6 Stolpersteine installed on 31 May 2012
- Meschede, Wennemen: 5 Stolpersteine installed on 31 May 2012
- Michelstadt: 21 Stolpersteine laid on 13 March 2010; some 40 more were planned for autumn 2010 and spring 2011
- Minden
- Mönchengladbach
- Mühlacker
- Mühlhausen
- Müllheim
- Mülheim an der Ruhr
- Munich: 24 Stolpersteine, as of May 2013 – all on private land as the city legislated against the laying of these stones in 2004. After reconsideration, the ban was confirmed in 2015.
- Münster
- Nabburg
- Naumburg
- Nettetal-Breyell: 6 Stolpersteine, laid 11 November 2010. 22 Stolpersteine, laid 10 December 2013
- Nettetal-Kaldenkirchen: 6 Stolpersteine, laid 6 February 2012. 9 Stolpersteine, laid 10 July 2013 5 Stolpersteine, laid 17 February 2016.
- Netphen: 6 Stolpersteine, as of May 2013
- Neu-Isenburg
- Neumünster
- Neuruppin: 16 Stolpersteine; there were about 1,000 local Aktion T4 victims
- Neuss
- Neustadt an der Weinstraße
- Neuwied
- Norden
- Nordhausen
- Nordhorn
- Nördlingen
- Nuremberg
- Ober-Ramstadt: 19 Stolpersteine
- Oberhausen
- Ochtrup
- Oederan: 4 Stolpersteine, see also List of Stolpersteine in Oederan
- Offenbach am Main: 68 Stolpersteine
- Offenburg
- Oranienburg: 24 Stolpersteine, as of June 2008; first memorials laid in 2005
- Osnabrück
- Osterath: 14 Stolpersteine; see also List of Stolpersteine in Osterath
- Ostheim vor der Rhön
- Papenburg
- Pasewalk
- Pattensen
- Peine
- Perleberg: 4 Stolpersteine laid 11 June 2009; see also List of Stolpersteine in Perleberg
- Petershagen (Eggersdorf)
- Pforzheim: 26 additional Stolpersteine scheduled to be laid on 22 May 2025
- Pfullendorf
- Plauen
- Potsdam: 13 Stolpersteine, first memorials laid in 2008; more to be laid on July 2, 2010
- Prenzlau: 18 Stolpersteine
- Quakenbrück
- Querfurt: 3 Stolpersteine placed October 2011; see also List of Stolpersteine in Querfurt
- Quickborn: 7 Stolpersteine as of 2012
- Radebeul: 5 Stolpersteine; see also List of Stolpersteine in Radebeul
- Rathenow: 4 Stolpersteine
- Ratingen
- Ravensburg: 17 Stolpersteine; see also List of Stolpersteine in Ravensburg
- Regensburg
- Reinbek
- Remscheid
- Rendsburg
- Rödelsee
- Ronneburg, Thuringia: 3 Stolpersteine; see also List of Stolpersteine in Ronneburg
- Rostock
- Rotenburg an der Fulda
- Rudolstadt
- Saarbrücken: 32 Stolpersteine; see also List of Stolpersteine in Saarbrücken
- Salzkotten
- Sankt Wendel: 20 Stolpersteine
- Sassnitz
- Schierling
- Schleswig
- Schlüchtern: 18 Stolpersteine as of 2021
- Schöneiche
- Schorndorf
- Schriesheim: 21 Stolpersteine; see also List of Stolpersteine in Schriesheim
- Schwabach
- Schwäbisch Gmünd
- Schwäbisch Hall
- Schwelm: 6 Stolpersteine; see also List of Stolpersteine in Schwelm
- Schwerin
- Schwerte
- Segnitz
- Selm: more than 9 Stolpersteine, as of September 2007
- Senftenberg: 20 Stolpersteine, as of November 2011
- Siegen: 83 Stolpersteine, as of May 2013
- Singen: 73 Stolpersteine; see also Stolpersteine in Singen
- Soest: 35 Stolpersteine in 21 places
- Sollingen
- Sömmerda
- Stegen
- Stendal
- Steinfurt
- Stockach: see also List of Stolpersteine in Stockach
- Stralsund
- Stuttgart: over 500 Stolpersteine in the city and outlying suburbs
- Sulingen
- Süßen
- Teupitz
- Telgte
- Themar, 36 Stolpersteine as of August 2018
- Treuenbrietzen
- Trier
- Troisdorf
- Tuttlingen: 5 Stolpersteine; see also Stolpersteine in Tuttlingen
- Überlingen
- Ueckermünde: 6 Stolpersteine; see also List of Stolpersteine in Ueckermünde
- Unna: 100 Stolpersteine, as of June 2012
- Usingen
- Vechta
- Verden an der Aller: see also Liste der Stolpersteine in Verden
- Viersen: 18 Stolpersteine
- Viersen-Dülken: 10 Stolpersteine laid in January 2009
- Viersen-Willich-Schiefbahn: 7 Stolpersteine laid February 6, 2012
- Vilshofen an der Donau
- Vlotho
- Waiblingen
- Waibstadt: 7 Stolpersteine placed April 2012
- Walldorf
- Weeze: 6 Stolpersteine
- Weimar
- Weimar (Lahn)
- Weingarten, see: Stolpersteine in Weingarten
- Weinheim
- Werne
- Wertheim
- Weisenheim am Berg
- Weißenfels
- Wernigerode
- Wetzlar
- Wiesbaden: 214 Stolpersteine as of 2009
- Wilhelmshaven, see: Stolpersteine in Wilhelmshaven
- Wiltingen
- Wissen
- Witten: 108 Stolpersteine; see also List of Stolpersteine in Witten
- Wittenberge: 25 Stolpersteine; see also List of Stolpersteine in Wittenberge
- Worms
- Wuppertal
- Würselen
- Würzburg: 269 Stolpersteine, as of May 2010
- Xanten
- Zehdenick
- Zella-Mehlis
- Zittau
- Zons
- Zossen
- Zwickau: 32 Stolpersteine, see also List of Stolpersteine in Zwickau
- Zwingenberg
- Zwönitz: 1 Stolperstein

== Greece ==
- Thessaloniki: 5 Stolpersteine at the harbour installed October 2016; about 160 in front of the school at Vasilissis Olgas
- Veria: 6 Stolpersteine in June 2019

== Hungary ==
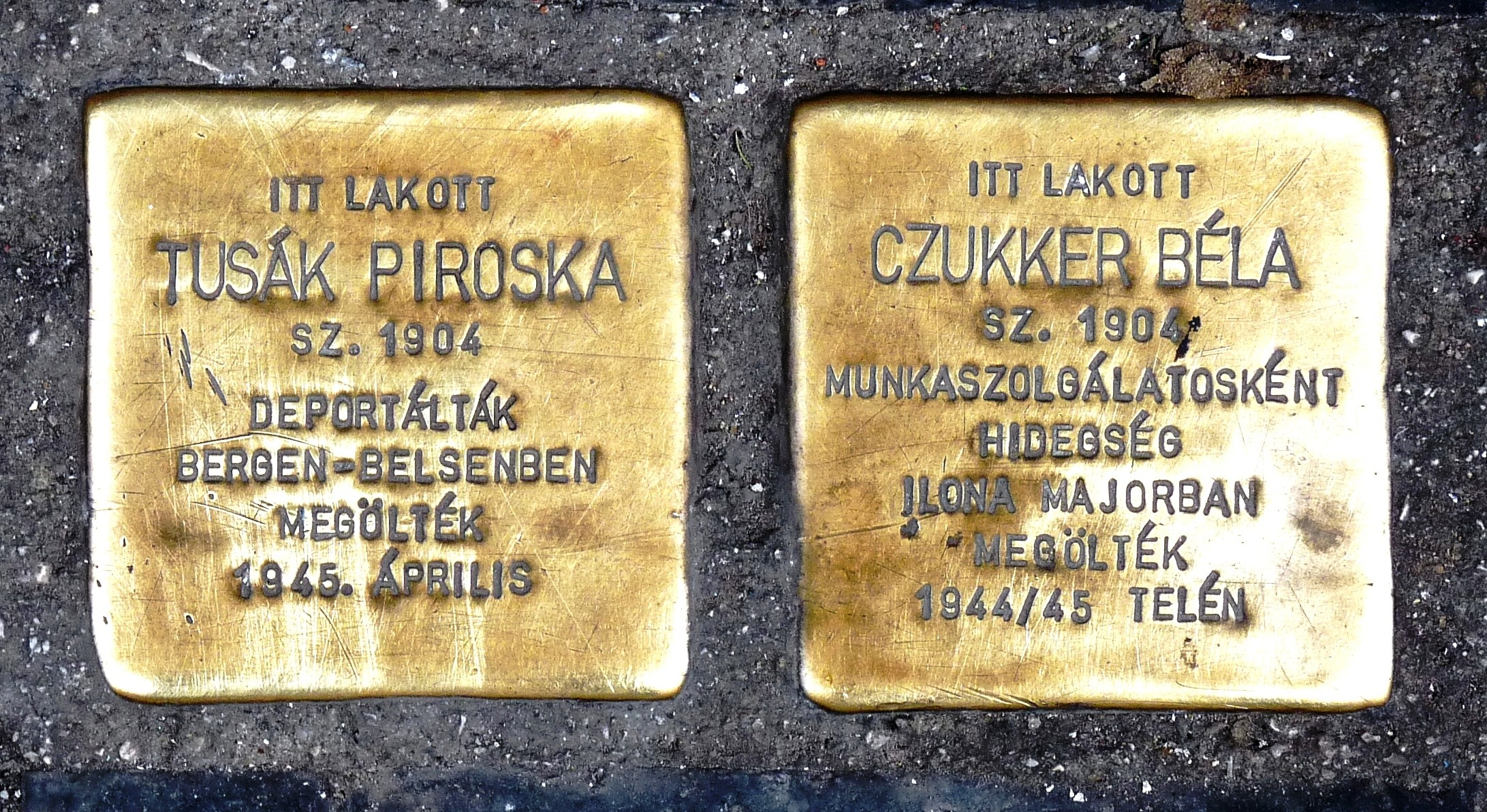
Stolpersteine in Budapest

- Balatonfüred
- Budapest: first 3 Stolpersteine installed in April 2007
- Esztergom
- Kiskunhalas
- Kistelek
- Kisvarda
- Makó
- Mátészalka
- Nagykanizsa
- Nagykőrös
- Pécs
- Szeged
- Szombathely
- Újfehértó
- Zalaegerszeg

== Ireland ==
- Dublin

== Italy ==
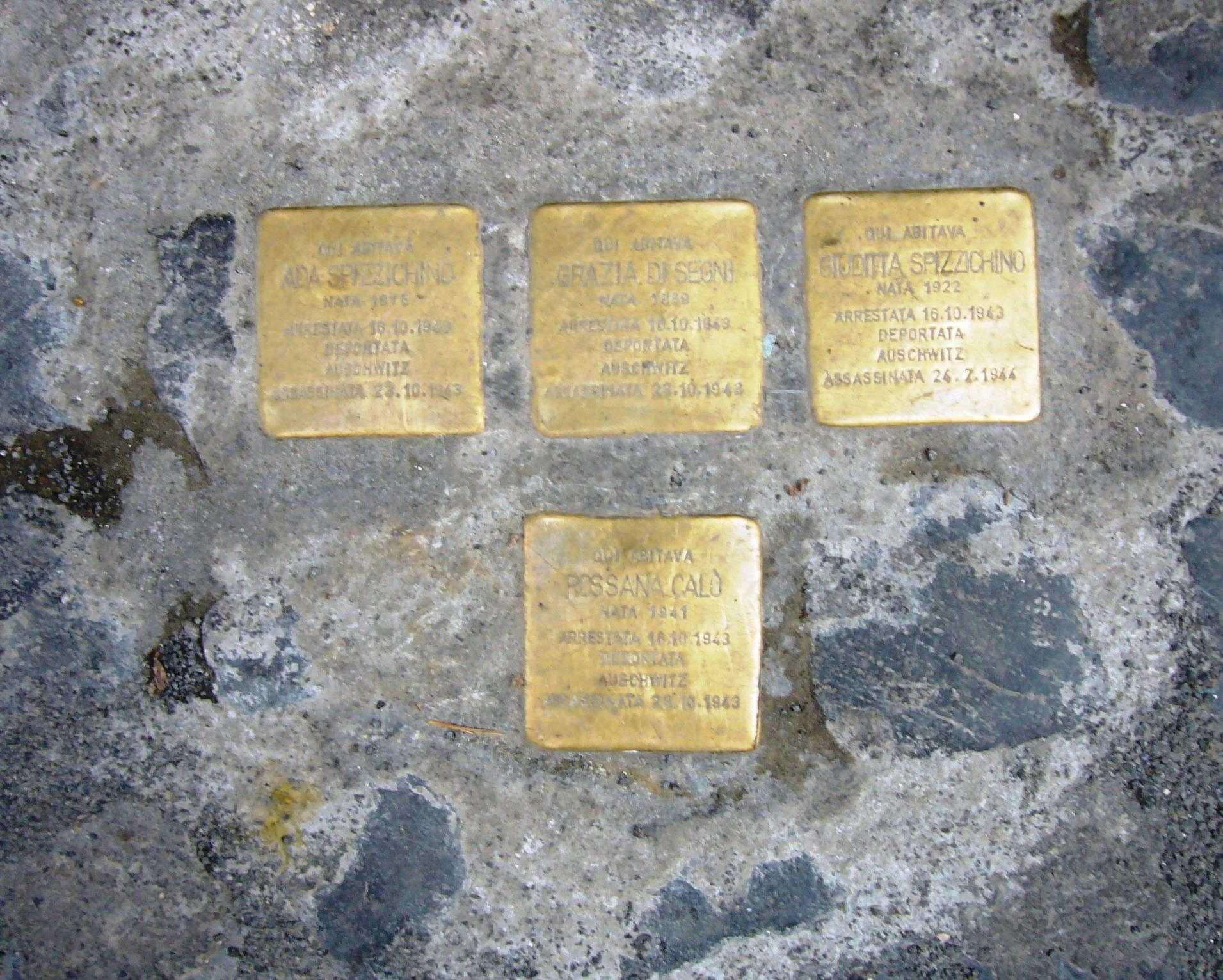
Stolpersteine in Rome

- Adro
- Ancona
- L'Aquila: 1 Stolperstein
- Auer: 2 Stolpersteine, laid in 2022
- Bergamo
- Bolzano: 15 Stolpersteine, laid in January 2015
- Belgioioso
- Brescia
- Calvagese della Riviera: 1 Stolperstein
- Collebeato: 1 Stolperstein
- Chieti
- Cuneo
- Doberdò del Lago
- Genoa: 3 Stolpersteine
- Faenza
- Finale Ligure: 4 Stolpersteine, as of January 2019
- Florence: 24 Stolpersteine, as of January 2020
- Forlì
- Gorizia
- Grosseto
- Lanciano: 4 Stolpersteine
- Lecco: 2 Stolpersteine
- Lecce: 3 Stolpersteine, as of January 2020
- Livorno: 18 Stolpersteine, as of January 2021
- Mantua
- Meran
- Milan: 90 Stolpersteine, as of January 2020
- Muggiò
- Naples: 9 Stolpersteine, as of January 2020
- Ostuni
- Padua
- Parma
- Pavia
- Pescara
- Pisa: 4 Stolpersteine, as of January 2017
- Prato
- Premolo
- Ravenna
- Rome: 249 Stolpersteine
- Ronchi dei Legionari
- Salò
- Sant'Angelo Lodigiano
- Sarezzo
- Schio
- Siena
- Teramo
- Turin: 85 Stolpersteine
- Trieste
- Venice: 185 Stolpersteine, as of January 2024
- Vicenza
- Vigevano
- Viterbo

== Latvia ==
- Riga, 4 Stolpersteine, installed 2018

== Lithuania ==
- Kaunas, 9 Stolpersteine, installed 2016
- Panevėžys, 4 Stolpersteine, installed 2016
- Šiauliai, 2 Stolpersteine, installed 2016
- Vilnius, 8 Stolpersteine, installed 2016

== Luxembourg ==
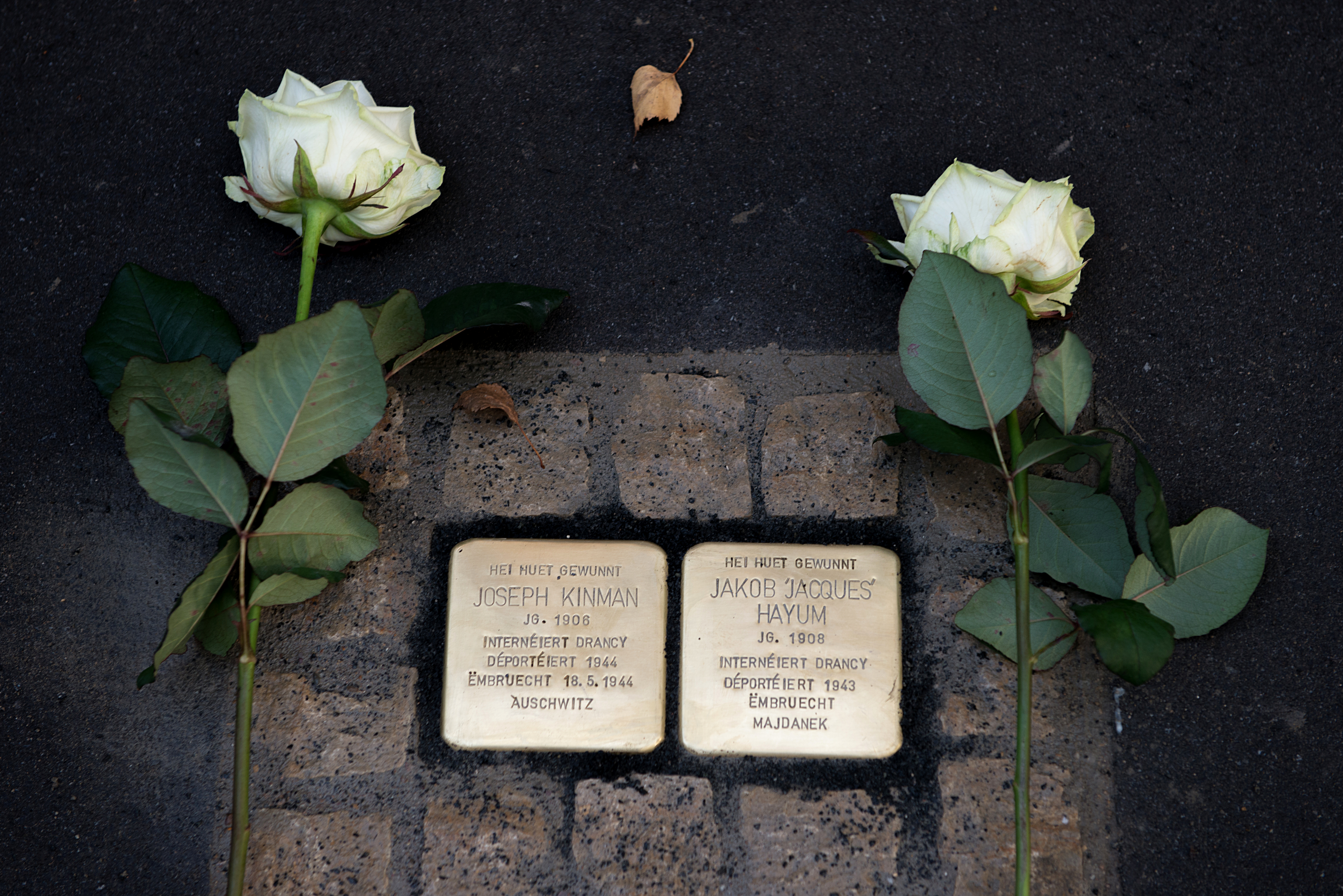
Stolpersteine in Mondorf-les-Bains

- Belvaux: 1 Stolperstein, installed in November 2015
- Differdange: 38 Stolpersteine, installed in October 2014 (15) and November 2015 (23)
- Esch-sur-Alzette: 14 Stolpersteine, installed on 22 October 2013
- Ettelbrück: 1 Stolperschwelle, installed in January 2013
- Mondorf-les-Bains: 11 Stolpersteine, installed November 2015, two of them for murdered anti-fascist resistants
- Remich: 17 Stolpersteine, installed in June 2016

== The Netherlands ==
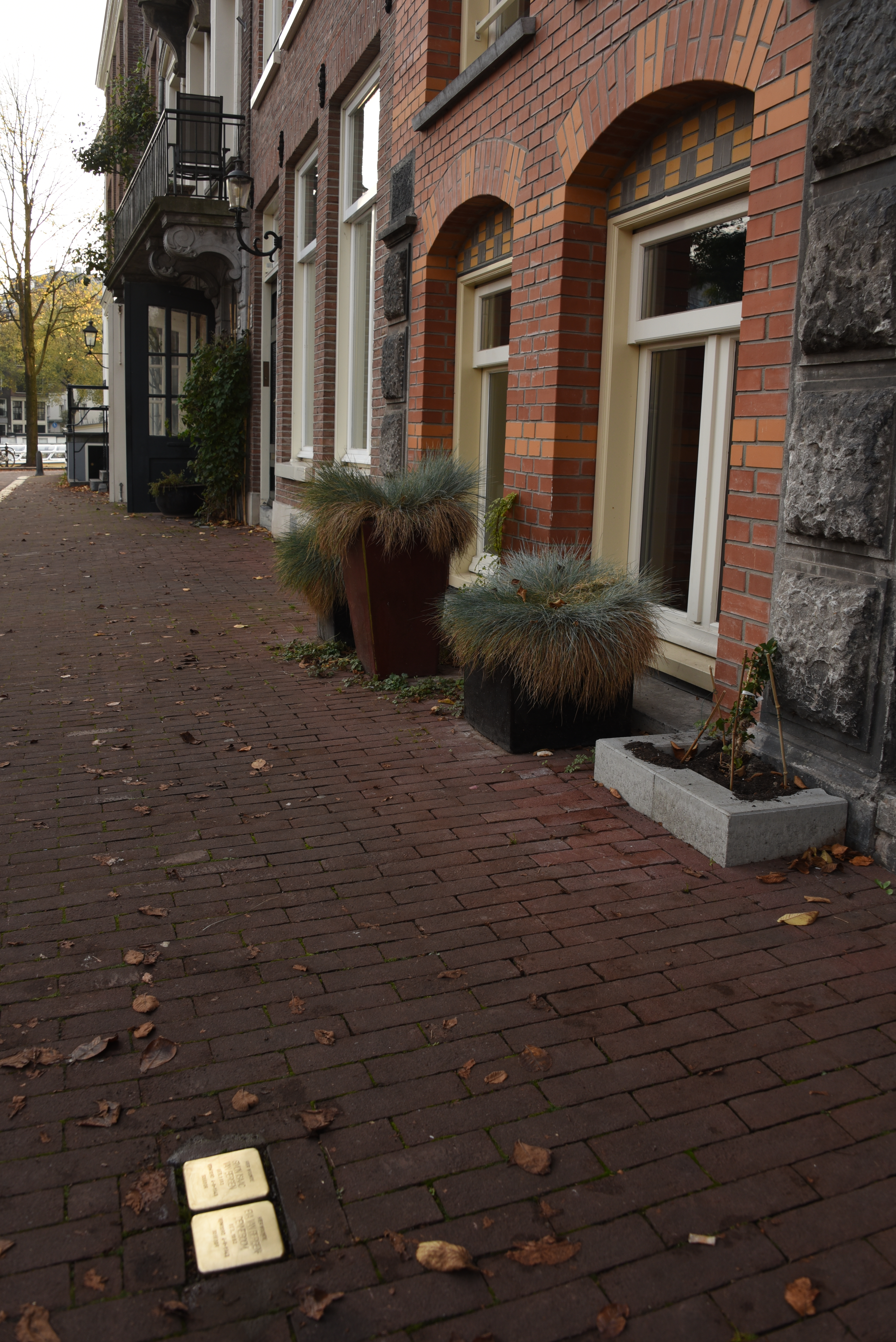
Stolpersteine in Amsterdam

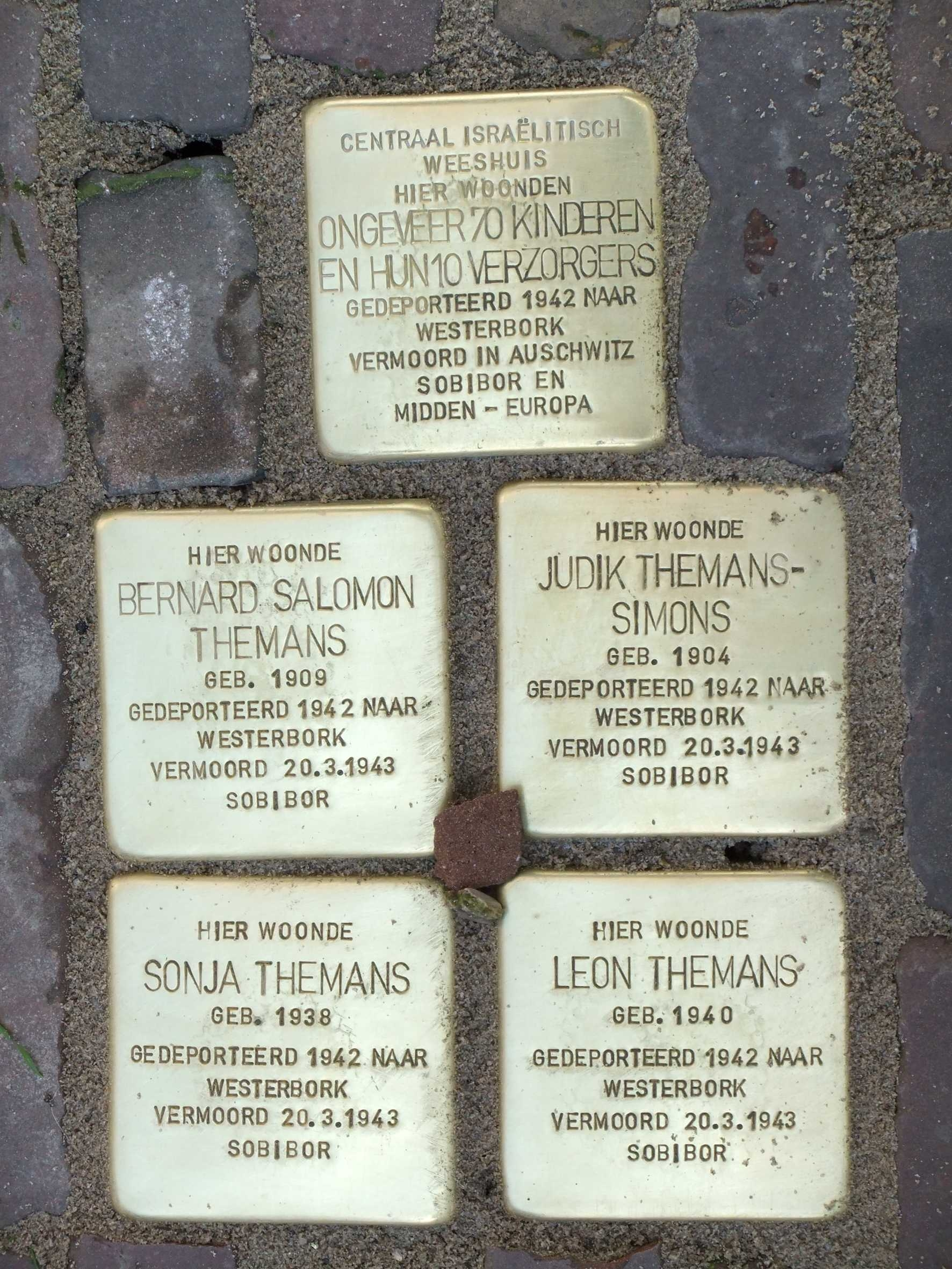
Stolpersteine in Utrecht

Over 100,000 Jews and over 200 Romani from the Netherlands were killed by the Nazis.

- Almelo
- Amersfoort
- Amsterdam
- Assen
- Bedum
- Beesd
- Bennekom
- Berkelland (Borculo)
- Bernisse
- Blaricum
- Borne (Overijssel)
- Breda
- Brielle
- Burgh
- Bussum
- Culemborg
- De Wolden
- Dedemsvaart
- Den Haag
- Deventer
- Dirksland
- Doesburg
- Domburg
- Dongen
- Dordrecht
- Drunen
- Eethen
- Echt-Susteren
- Eindhoven
- Elst
- Emmen
- Enschede
- Etten-Leur
- Geertruidenberg
- Geffen
- Goirle
- Gorinchem
- Gouda
- Grave
- Groningen
- Grootegast
- Haaksbergen
- Haarlem
- The Hague
- Halderberge
- Hardenberg
- Haren, Groningen
- Harlingen
- Hattem
- 's-Heerenberg
- Heerlen: 25 Stolpersteine installed August 2012
- Heeze-Leende
- Hellendoorn
- Hellevoetsluis
- 's-Hertogenbosch
- Herwijnen
- Hilversum
- Hof van Twente
- Hoogezand-Sappemeer
- Kampen (Overijssel)
- Kerkrade
- Leiden
- Lochem
- Losser
- Maarssen
- Maastricht
- Meppel
- Middelburg
- Middelharnis
- Moergestel
- Monster
- Naaldwijk
- Neder-Betuwe (Ochten)
- Neerijnen (Ophemert)
- Nieuwkuijk
- Nijkerk
- Nijmegen
- Nunspeet
- Ochten
- Oisterwijk
- Oldambt
- Ommen
- Oost Gelre (Groenlo)
- Oosterhout
- Ophemert
- Oss
- Oude-Tonge
- Ouddorp
- Pekela
- Renkum
- Rijssen-Holten
- De Ronde Venen
- Roosendaal
- Rossum (Gelderland)
- Rotterdam
- Schagen
- Sint-Michielsgestel
- Slochteren
- Soest
- Spijkenisse
- Stadskanaal
- Súdwest-Fryslân (Sneek)
- Tiel
- Tilburg
- Tynaarlo
- Urk
- Utrecht
- Vaals
- Valkenburg aan de Geul
- Veere
- Veghel
- Venlo: first Stolperstein installed in June 2012
- Vianen (Utrecht)
- Vlijmen
- Vlissingen
- Weesp
- Werkendam
- Westvoorne (Oostvoorne)
- Wierden
- Winterswijk
- Woudrichem
- Zaanstad (Zaandam)
- Zaltbommel
- Zevenbergen
- Zierikzee
- Zuidlaren
- Zutphen
- Zwolle

== Norway ==
773 Jews were taken in Norway and sent to Germany. 38 of them survived. As of April 2020, there are 606 Stolpersteine in Norway. Cities, amongst others, where Stolpersteine have been placed:

- Bergen: 10 Stolpersteine were laid in June 2014.
- Elverum: 7 Stolpersteine were laid in August 2013.
- Harstad: 3 Stolpersteine were laid in June 2014.
- Haugesund: 2 Stolpersteine were laid on the 75 year anniversary of Kristallnacht, 9 November 2013, in memory of Moritz Rabinowitz and Georg Rechenberg.
- Hurum: 6 Stolpersteine on laid in June 2014.
- Hønefoss: 8 Stolpersteine laid in June 2014.
- Larvik: 9 Stolpersteine laid in September 2012.
- Mosjøen: 3 Stolpersteine were laid in August 2013.
- Narvik: 9 Stolpersteine were laid in June 2014.
- Oslo: 101 Stolpersteine. The first ones were laid in August 2010.
- Son: 1 Stolperstein.
- Skien: 2 Stolpersteine were laid in June 2014.
- Stavanger: 14 Stolpersteine.
- Tromsø: 14 Stolpersteine laid in June 2014.
- Trondheim: 15 Stolpersteine, the first laid in September 2012.
- Tønsberg: 17 Stolpersteine were laid in June 2014.
- Kristiansund: 19 Stolpersteine were laid in June 2016.

== Moldova ==
- Chișinău: 2 Stolpersteine

== Poland ==
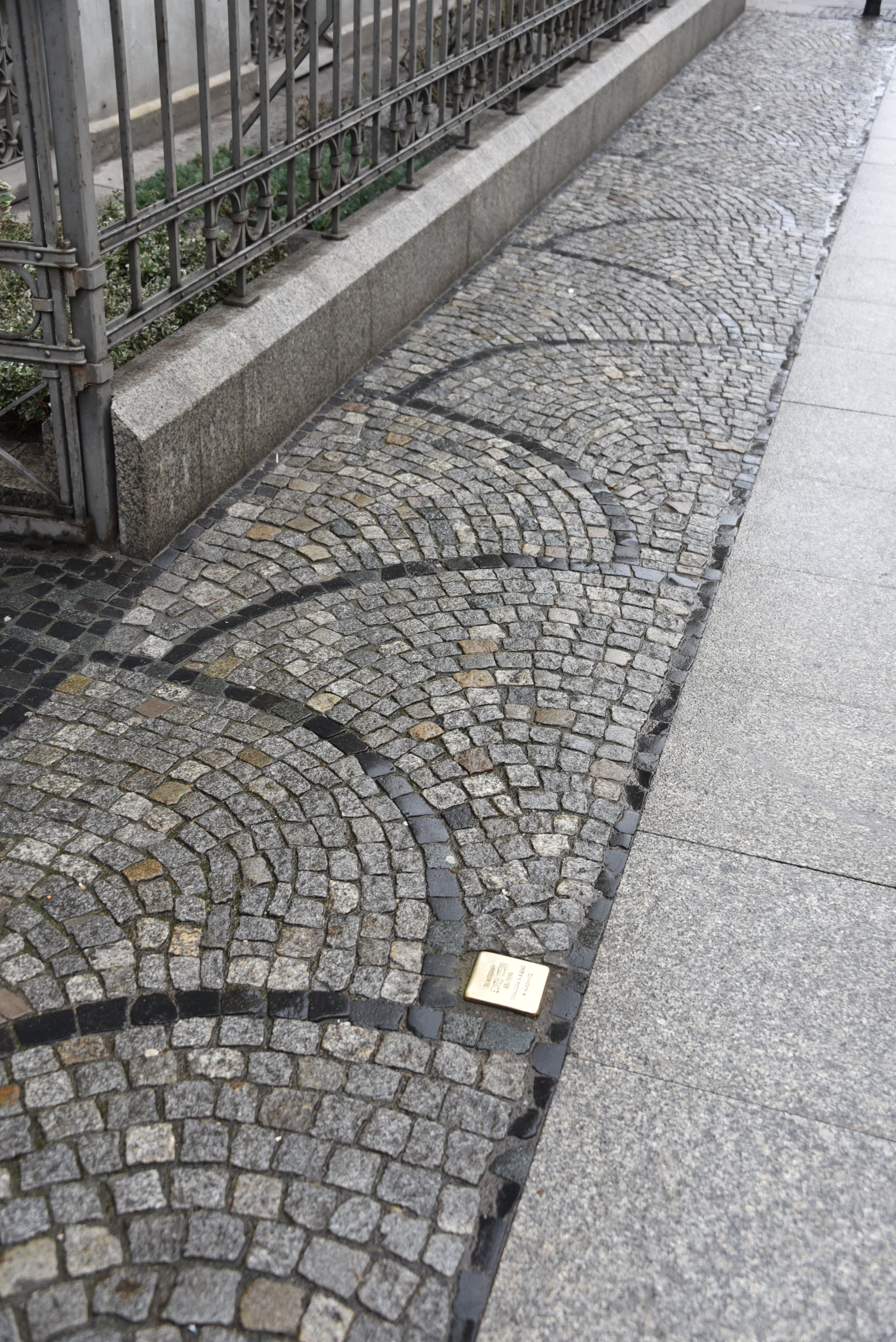
Stolperstein for Edith Stein in Wrocław

- Biała Podlaska: 3 Stolpersteine
- Białystok: 18 Stolpersteine
- Bytom
- Łomża: 2 Stolpersteine
- Mińsk Mazowiecki: 1 Stolperstein
- Raczki: 5 Stolpersteine
- Słubice
- Wrocław

== Romania ==
- Porț, 6 Stolperstein, laid in July 2014
- Timișoara, 1 Stolperstein, laid in May 2014

== Russia ==
- Kromy, Oryol Oblast
- Oryol: Stolpersteine were laid in July 2013.

== Serbia ==
- Belgrade, collocated on in July 2022
- Novi Bečej
- Zrenjanin, collocated in August 2021

== Slovakia ==
44 Stolpersteine were installed in Slovakia between 2012 and 2014 with the help of local organisation Antikomplex.sk.

- Banská Bystrica
- Bratislava
- Nitra
- Brezno
- Častá
- Halič
- Komárno
- Lučenec
- Prešov
- Prievidza
- Ratková

== Slovenia ==
- Maribor, 12 Stolpersteine
- Ljubljana, 48 Stolpersteine
- Murska Sobota, 11 Stolpersteine
- Lendava, 22 Stolpersteine
- Šalovci, 4 Stolpersteine

== Spain ==
- Barcelona
- Gijón
- Madrid
- Manresa
- Navàs
- Ontinyent
- Sabadell
- Soria
- Terrassa

== Sweden ==
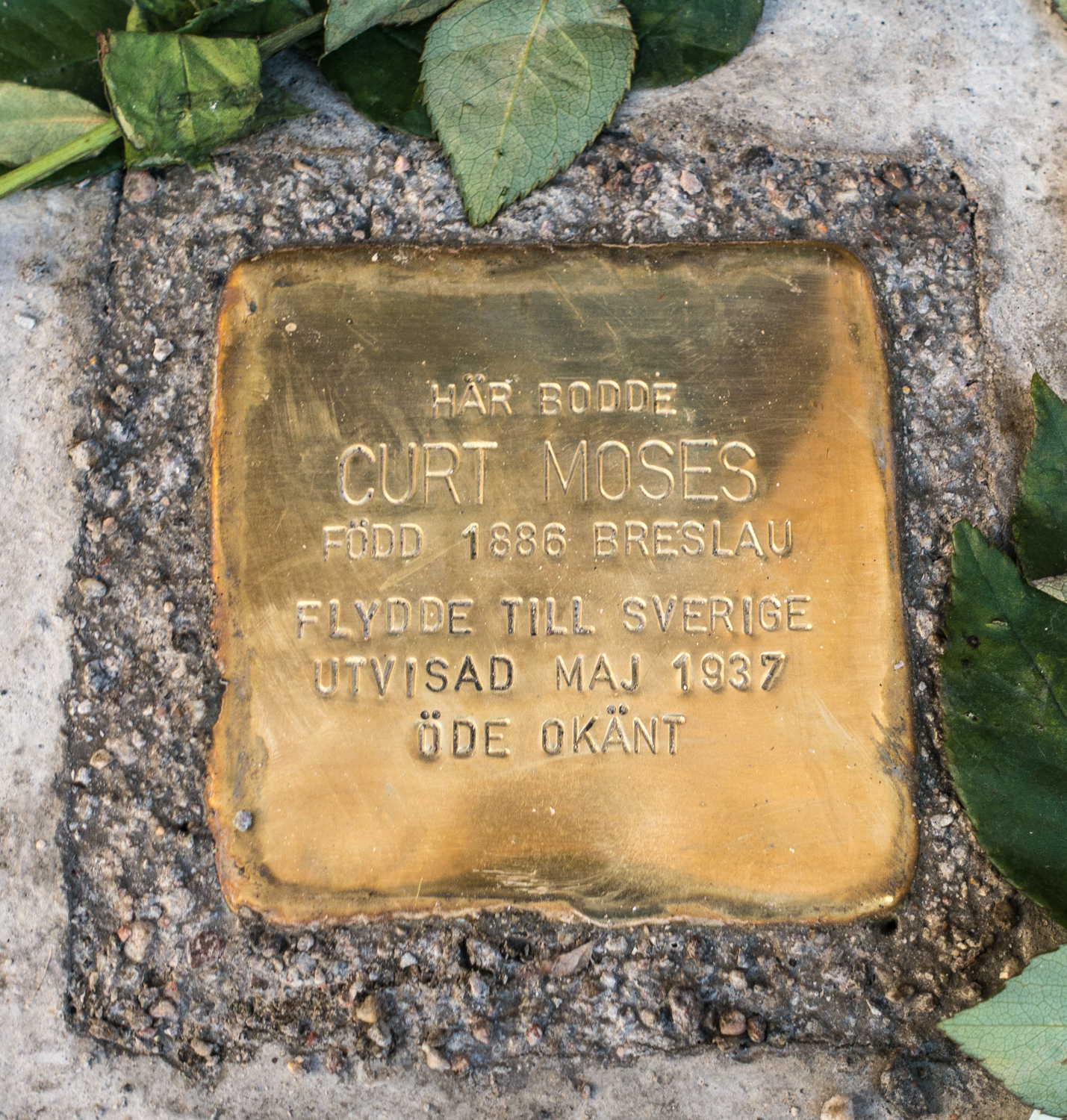
Stolperstein in Stockholm

- Stockholm, 3 Stolpersteine
- Malmö, 3 Stolpersteine

== Switzerland ==
- Kreuzlingen: Stolpersteine were laid in September 2013.

== Ukraine ==
- Pereiaslav: 4 Stolpersteine were laid in July 2009, the first ones installed in the country.
- Rivne: 5 Stolpersteine.
- Kyiv: Stolpersteine are being installed on the initiative of the German embassy in Ukraine; the work is realized by the Ukrainian Centre on Holocaust Studies in cooperation with the "Space of Tolerance" educational centre and the Kyiv City State Administration; 80 stones are planned to be installed. In October 2026, German family minister Karin Prien visited Kyiv and installed a Stolperstein for the historian Ilya Galant, who was killed at Babyn Yar.

== United Kingdom ==
- London: the first Stolperstein was laid in Golden Square, Soho in May 2022 to honour Ada van Dantzig.
- Edinburgh: At St Stephen's Church in Stockbridge, dedicated to the memory of Jane Haining.

There are currently no Stolpersteine in Northern Ireland or Wales.

== Imitations ==
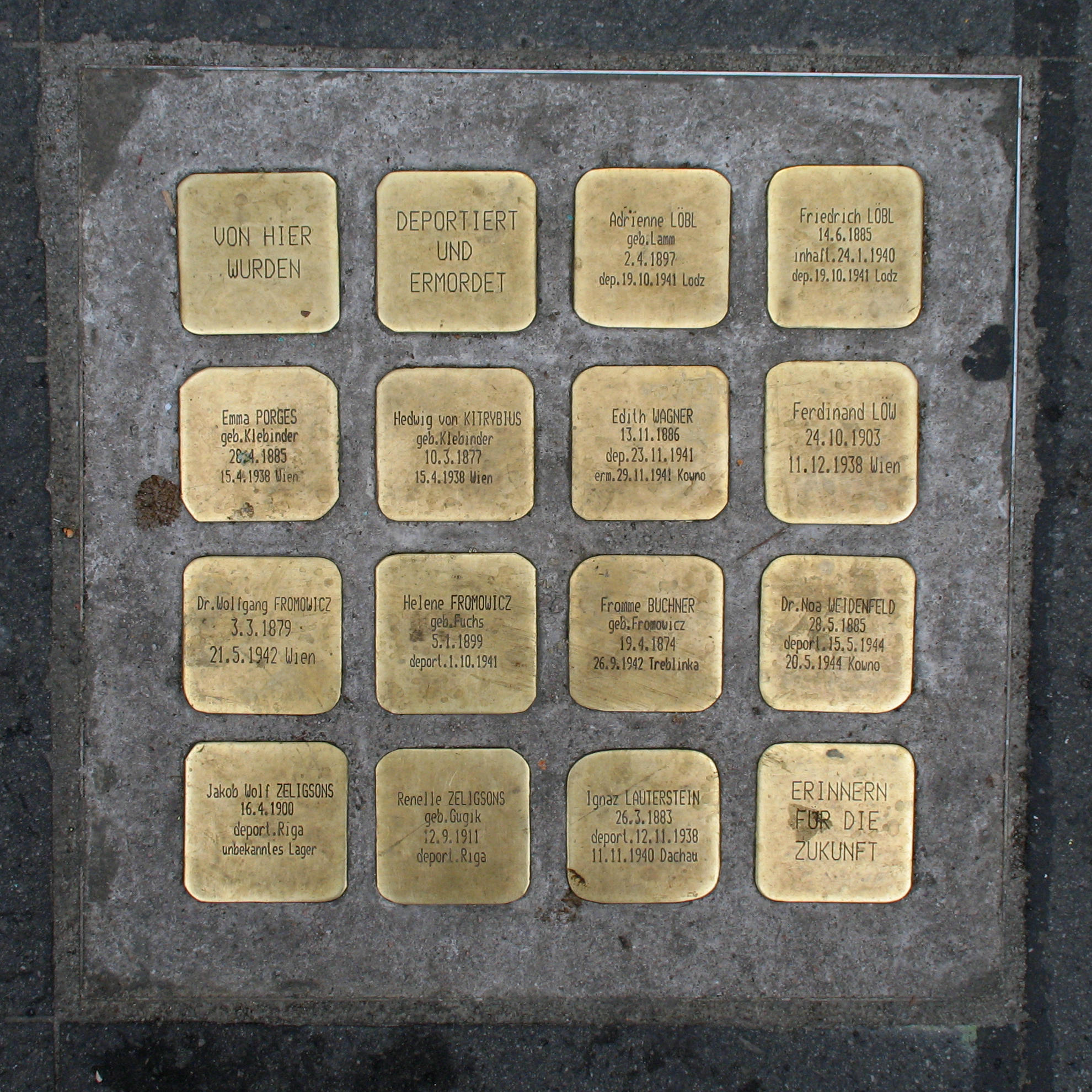
Imitation Stolperstein memorial to 13 people arrested from one address in Vienna

In several cities there are imitations of Stolpersteine, although the concept of Gunter Demnig is protected by copyright and registered as a trademark all over Europe.

- Austria: in Vienna there are more than 1,000 memorial plaques dedicated to the victims of the Nazi regime.
- Belgium: imitations are collocated in Mechelen in Flanders.
- Czech Republic: imitations can be found in Benešov, Brno, Liberec and Židlochovice, although the majority of the Brno memorial plaques are original Stolpersteine by Demnig.
- Netherlands: imitations can be found in Amersfoort, Bellingwedde, Veendam and Vught. They are called "Herdenkingstenen" and are made of black marmor.

== See also ==
- Gunter Demnig – the German artist who conceived the Stolperstein Project ("Projekt Stolpersteine") and has installed the most memorial plaques
