= Andrée Grandjean =

Lawyer and Belgium resistance member (1910–1999)

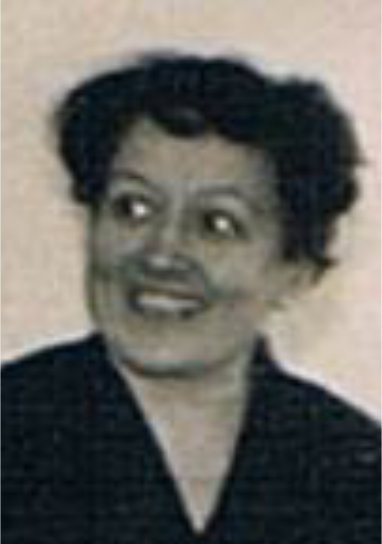
- Born: 29 June 1910; Schaerbeek
- Died: 29 November 1999 (aged 89)
- Other name: Françoise Bontemps
- Occupations: Lawyer, member of the Belgian Resistance during the Second World War.

Andrée Grandjean (French pronunciation: [ɑ̃dʁe ɡʁɑ̃ʒɑ̃]; pseudonym Françoise Bontemps) (29 June 1910 – 29 November 1999) was a Belgian lawyer and a member of the Belgian Resistance during the Second World War. She was a leader in the Front de l'indépendance, a co-organiser of the Faux Soir newspaper act of resistance and a communist activist.

== Early life and education ==
Andrée Elvire Jeanne Grandjean was born on 29 June 1910 in Schaerbeek, into a liberal family. Her mother, Berthe Marie Constance Springael, born in Ghent, was a teacher and active feminist and her father, Arthur Marie Grandjean, was a senior civil servant with the Belgian National Railway Company (SNCB).

Grandjean studied law at the Université libre de Bruxelles, where she graduated in 1933 and joined l'Ordre des avocats (the Belgian Bar Association) on 21 December 1936.

== Career ==
She then joined the office of minister Eugène Soudan, a member of the Parti ouvrier belge (Belgian Labour Party). There Grandjean met the communist lawyer Robert Lejour, who was in charge of Secours rouge international, and she became involved in the organisation. In 1937/8, she accompanied Antonina Grégoire, her close friend from university, to Berlin on a mission for Secours rouge international. They hoped to make a case for leniency for Olga Benário Prestes, a German-Brazilian communist militant and partner of the Brazilian communist leader, Luis Carlos Prestes, who was then incarcerated as a political prisoner in the Moabit prison with her child Anita Leocádia Prestes. They tried in vain to meet Heinrich Himmler to present their case and Prestes was later parted from her child and executed. They also visited other political prisoners, including Liselotte Herrmann, a German anti-Nazi activist sentenced to death.

== Personal life ==
Grandjean married a Polish man named Kowalski, but the couple separated in 1940. She later married Max Cosyns (1906–1998), a nuclear physicist and speleologist.

== Resistance during the Second World War ==
With the invasion of Belgium in 1940, Grandjean fled to France with several of Eugène Soudan's relatives. She later returned to Belgium and separated from her first husband during this time and he remained in France.

Grandjean then began to attend meetings with lawyers and judges who gathered around lawyer and resistance leader Jean Fonteyne. This network would be of great help to her during her resistance work.

From October 1941, Grandjean was a member of the editorial board of the underground magazine Justice Libre.

Her house in Walloon Brabant served as a clandestine meeting place for the Resistance couple Antonina Grégoire and her lawyer husband Jean Bastien.

In 1942, Grandjean escaped from German police officers who had come to arrest her at her home in rue Coghen in Uccle. She had compromising papers hidden in her country house destroyed by the lawyer general Adrien van den Branden de Reeth. Until this attempted arrest, she had been distributing the clandestine newspaper Justice libre au Palais. In June 1942, she was asked to find a new printer for the newspaper and went into hiding for a few months in Antwerp. As she no longer had any financial resources, she returned to her home, broke the police seal and recovered the savings she had hidden there.

On her return to Brussels, she remained in hiding, but joined the Communist Party of Belgium. She was still responsible for printing the Justice libre paper, which at this point was printed on a roneo mimeograph duplicating machine.

In July 1943, the German police intensified their hunt for Communists, and many arrests were made. Andrée Grandjean joined the Walloon Brabant regional leadership of the Front de l'Indépendance, along with Paul Libois, René Noël and Adrien van den Branden de Reeth, and used the pseudonym Françoise Bontemps. In charge of organisation, she was particularly involved with intellectuals, the Palais and civil servants, and provided assistance to individuals avoiding being drafted into the military. She also edited the underground newspapers Front, Libération, L'Élastique and L'Enseignement libre.

== Le Faux Soir ==
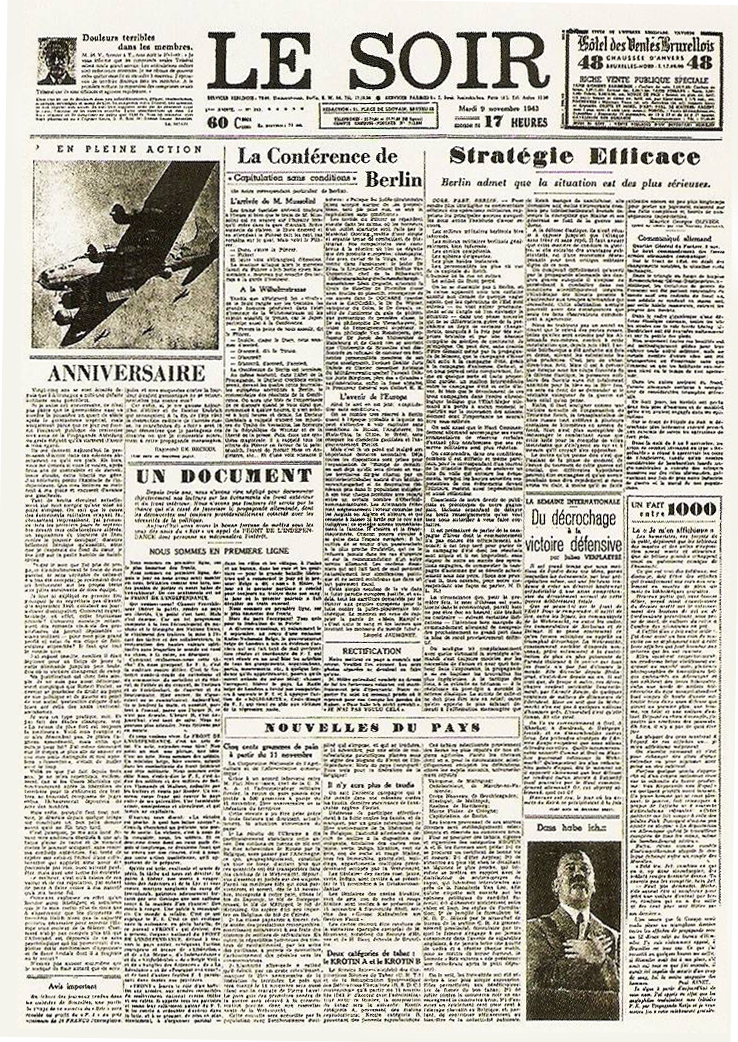
Le Faux Soir 9 November 1943

Marc Aubrion had the idea for the Front de l'Indépendance to produce a newspaper spoof that mocked the major daily French language paper Le Soir. Le Soir continued to be published during the occupation but under Nazi censorship, so earning the nickname Le Soir volé (stolen). The editors of the Faux Soir were Fernand Demany, former editor of Le Soir and national secretary of the Front de l'Indépendance, Adrien van den Branden de Reeth and Pierre Ansiaux, a liberal lawyer. Andrée Grandjean obtained 50,000 Belgian francs to cover the printing costs from businessman Alfred Fourcroy, who was also in charge of an escape network for Allied pilots.

The newspapers were distributed on 9 November 1943 across a series of busy newsagents. The pastiche embodied zwanze (self-deprecating humour associated with Brussels) and was very successful, being easily mistaken for the original. The hoax drew a lot of amusement in Belgium, some articles were translated by the English press and it inspired similar action in France. However, the backlash was severe and several people involved in the project were arrested: Ferdinand Wellens, the printer, Jean Plas, who made the fake strips, and Théo Mullier, the employee of Le Soir who provided the imprint for the title, did not survive their deportation.

== Post war ==
After the war, because of ill health, Grandjean didn't immediately resume her work as a lawyer. However, she did plead certain cases. She obtained a death sentence for the person who had denounced Jean Hansen, a student member of the Resistance who had been shot by the occupying forces, from the Liège Conseil de guerre. She resumed her practice at the end of the 1940s, working on the Marcinelle mining disaster trial.

For two years she acted as Secretary to the Commission d’enquête des secrétaires généraux (Commission of Inquiry of the General Secretaries). At the same time, she took on various responsibilities within the Belgian Communist Party. Elected to the Brussels Federal Committee, she was responsible for intellectuals in the political party. In 1946, Grandjean became involved in Renaissance judiciaire, the successor publication to Justice libre. She continued this activity within the Association des juristes démocrates. She was president of the feminist association ASBL Foyer de la Femme - Vrouwen Haard Avondsterre, founded by her mother, Berthe Grandjean, in Ghent.

In 1951, when the Front de l'indépendance was in turmoil, she agreed to join the National Secretariat as part of the compromise team elected at the Xth Congress of the organisation.

== Life in the Basque Country ==
In 1970, she retired to Licq-Athérey, a small village commune in Basque Country, with her second husband Max Cosyns who owned a farm there and had spent a lot of time there since 1954.

== Later years ==
In her old age, she returned to Belgium with her husband. Max Cosyns died on 30 March 1998 and Andrée Grandjean on 29 November 1999. On 25 September 2025, a street in Ixelles was named in her honour.

The Centre des archives communistes de Belgique holds biographical documents relating to Andrée Grandjean in the Jean Fonteyne collection.

== Awards ==
- Chevalier de l'ordre de la Couronne
- Croix de Guerre 1940-1945 avec palmes
- 1971: Capitaine de la Résistance par les Milices patriotiques.

She also received several other awards in Belgium and England.
