= Faux Soir =

1943 spoof issue of Le Soir

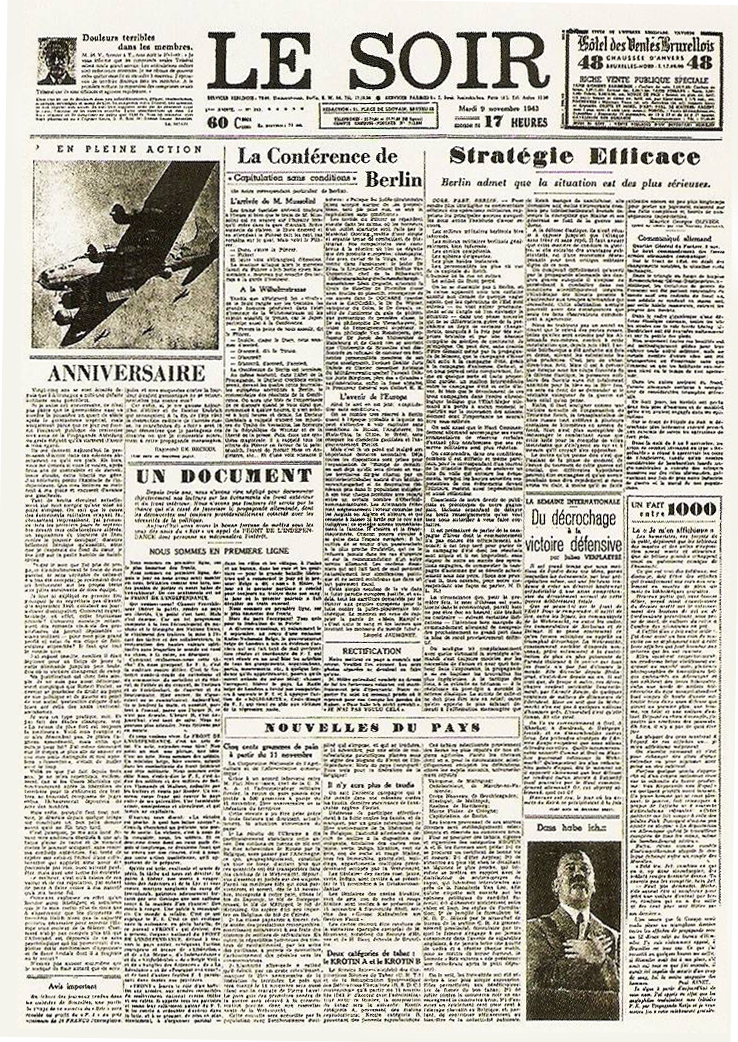
- Front page of the Faux Soir
- Owner: Front de l'Indépendance
- Founders: Marc Aubrion; René Noël
- Publisher: Ferdinand Wellens
- Founded: 9 November 1943 (only one issue)
- Political alignment: Satirical; Pro-allied
- Language: French
- Circulation: 50,000 copies

The "Faux Soir" (French pronunciation: [fo swaʁ], lit. 'Fake Le Soir') was a spoof issue of the newspaper Le Soir published in German-occupied Belgium on 9 November 1943. It was produced by the Front de l'Indépendance, a faction in the Belgian Resistance, in a satirical style that ridiculed the propaganda put out through German-controlled media like Le Soir. Though it resulted in significant repression, the Faux Soir's embodiment of zwanze, the characteristic folk humour of Brussels, made it an enduring symbol of the Resistance. The incident was the centerpiece for the 1954 film, Un Soir de Joie. In September 2025 Belgian filmmaker Michaël R Roskam began filming Le Faux Soir , a major historical film devoted to this moment in the national resistance, starring Arieh Worthalter in the main role .

== Background ==
The Belgian newspaper Le Soir had ceased to appear on 18 May 1940, a few days after the German invasion of Belgium. It was relaunched by collaborationist journalists such as Horace Van Offel and Raymond De Becker with the acceptance of the German occupier.

The most famous author to publish in Le Soir during this time was doubtlessly Hergé with The Adventures of Tintin comic The Shooting Star (French: L'étoile mystérieuse), featuring his famous character Tintin.

The paper's propagandist transformation led to its nickname "the stolen Le Soir" (French: Soir volé). Nonetheless it maintained a comfortable circulation of 300,000 (compared with just over 90,000 as of 2009 for the modern Soir).

The Front de l'Indépendance (FI) was a Belgian resistance movement founded in March 1941 by Dr. Albert Marteaux (a communist), Father André Roland, a Roman Catholic priest, and Fernand Demany, with the aim of uniting Belgian resistance fighters of various opinions and stances.

By the end of the war the FI national committee would include representation from a large number of resistance organisations such as the Armée belge des partisans (PA), the Milices Patriotiques (MP), Independent Wallonia (French: Wallonie indépendante), the National Rally of Youth (French: Rassemblement national de la jeunesse) and the country's main parties and trade unions.

Through these various organisations, the FI ran sabotage operations, escape routes, a false document service, and circulated 250 different underground publications.

== The Faux Soir project ==
The idea for Faux Soir came to Marc Aubrion on 19 October 1943 while he was editing an article planned for 11 November. The following day he shared his idea with René Noël, head of the press department of the FI in Brabant and Hainaut. The idea was to publish and distribute a fake issue of Le Soir on 11 November, which would be the 25th anniversary of the German defeat in World War I.

Noël was enthusiastic about the idea, and along with Aubrion, he quickly put in place the steps which would allow such a significant operation to be carried out within 21 days. The publication date was fixed for November 9. The 10th was a Wednesday, the day when Le Soir would be published on four pages. The difficulty of printing a single page seemed enough, and the release of Faux Soir was put forward by a day.

Problems abounded. Firstly, Aubrion and Noël rapidly realised that the project would go well beyond their initial estimate of a few hundred copies. They decided to limit the circulation to 100 copies per newsagent or kiosk, adding a banner to each pack of newspapers which explained that the small number of copies was due to a breakdown of Le Soir's machinery. Nonetheless even this limited distribution demanded a print run of 50,000 copies, assuming 500 kiosks to give Brussels reasonable coverage.

Added to the difficulty of printing the fake newspaper, which in particular presupposed obtaining almost non-existent large-format paper and using printing machinery which was all under surveillance, the paper would have to be distributed under the very nose of the occupier as well as short-circuiting the normal distribution channels of the real Le Soir.

Noël set out to find financial support. He quickly obtained it thanks to Andrée Grandjean ("Françoise"), a lawyer at the Court of Appeal and a key figure in publishing the clandestine newspaper Justice libre au Palais. She enlisted the help of businessman Alfred Fourcroy, who was also in charge of an escape network for allied pilots. 50,000 Belgian francs were advanced to cover printing costs.

== The operation ==
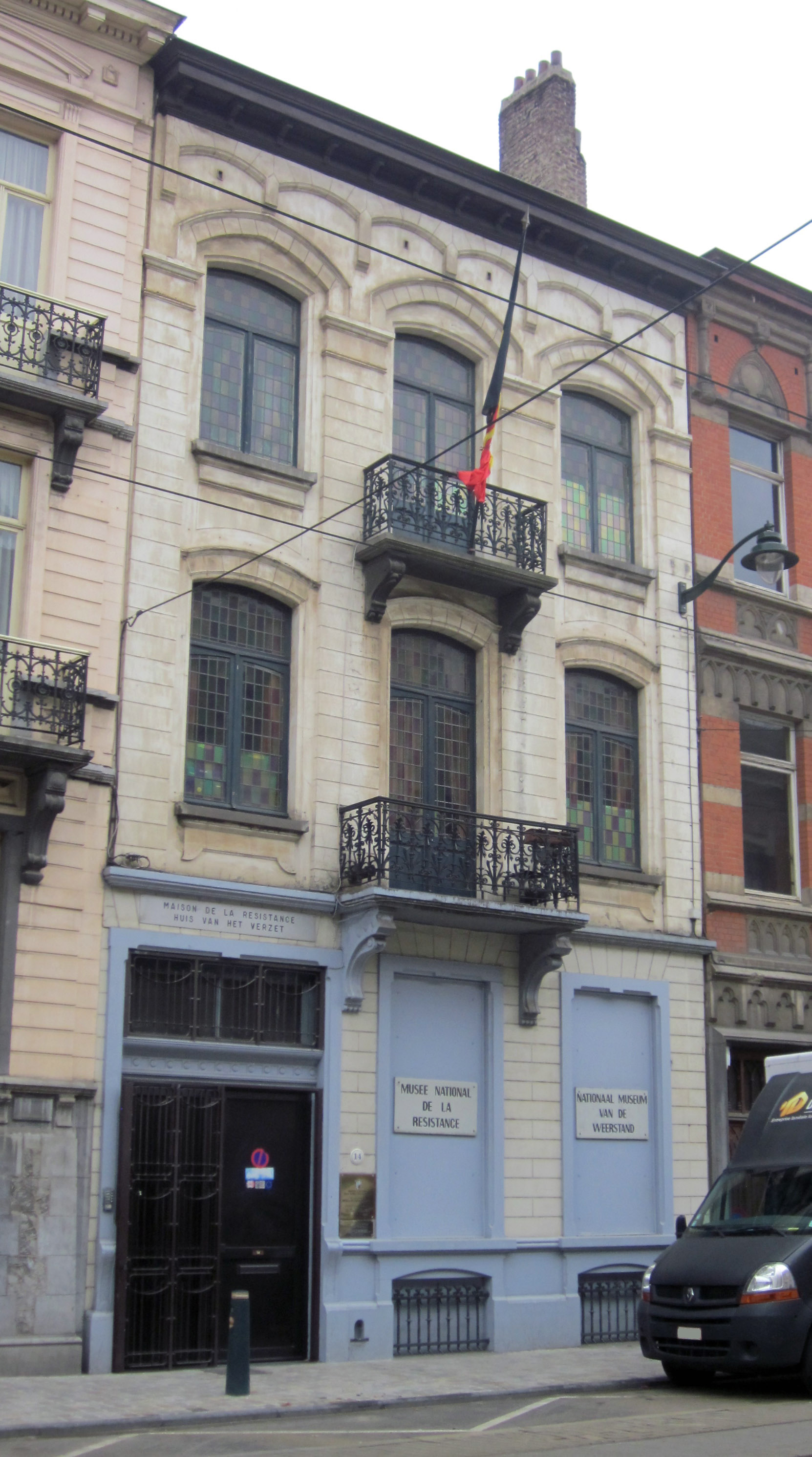
The building in Anderlecht, Brussels in which the photographs for the Faux Soir were prepared. It now houses the National Museum of the Resistance.

Although the initial idea was to make Faux Soir a counter-propaganda pamphlet, it rapidly evolved into a parody. Faux Soir was to become a full expression of Brussels' zwanze humour, aiming to amuse Brussels, Belgium, and all European resistance sympathisers. While the articles were being written and edited, the practical problems were surmounted at a speed which can only be explained by the level of enthusiasm created by the project.

Through Théo Mullier, a member of the FI who worked for Le Soir, the resistance gained access to a printing template with the paper's title letterhead, and to a list of bookstores directly served by the newspaper with the time of day and size of each delivery.

Pierre Ballancourt, a linotypist who published newspapers and tracts for the FI, put Aubrion in contact with his former employer, Ferdinand Wellens, a printer who would put his presses at the FI's disposal. As luck had it, Wellens was also a resistance sympathiser who already published for the FI. Wellens provided the use not only of the necessary paper, his workshops and linotypists, but also his presses, all for the price of one franc per copy. At this point the 5,000 copies were no longer a dream; it was decided to print 50,000, of which 5,000 would be distributed using standard routes. The others would be sold underground for 10 francs each with proceeds going towards financing the FI.

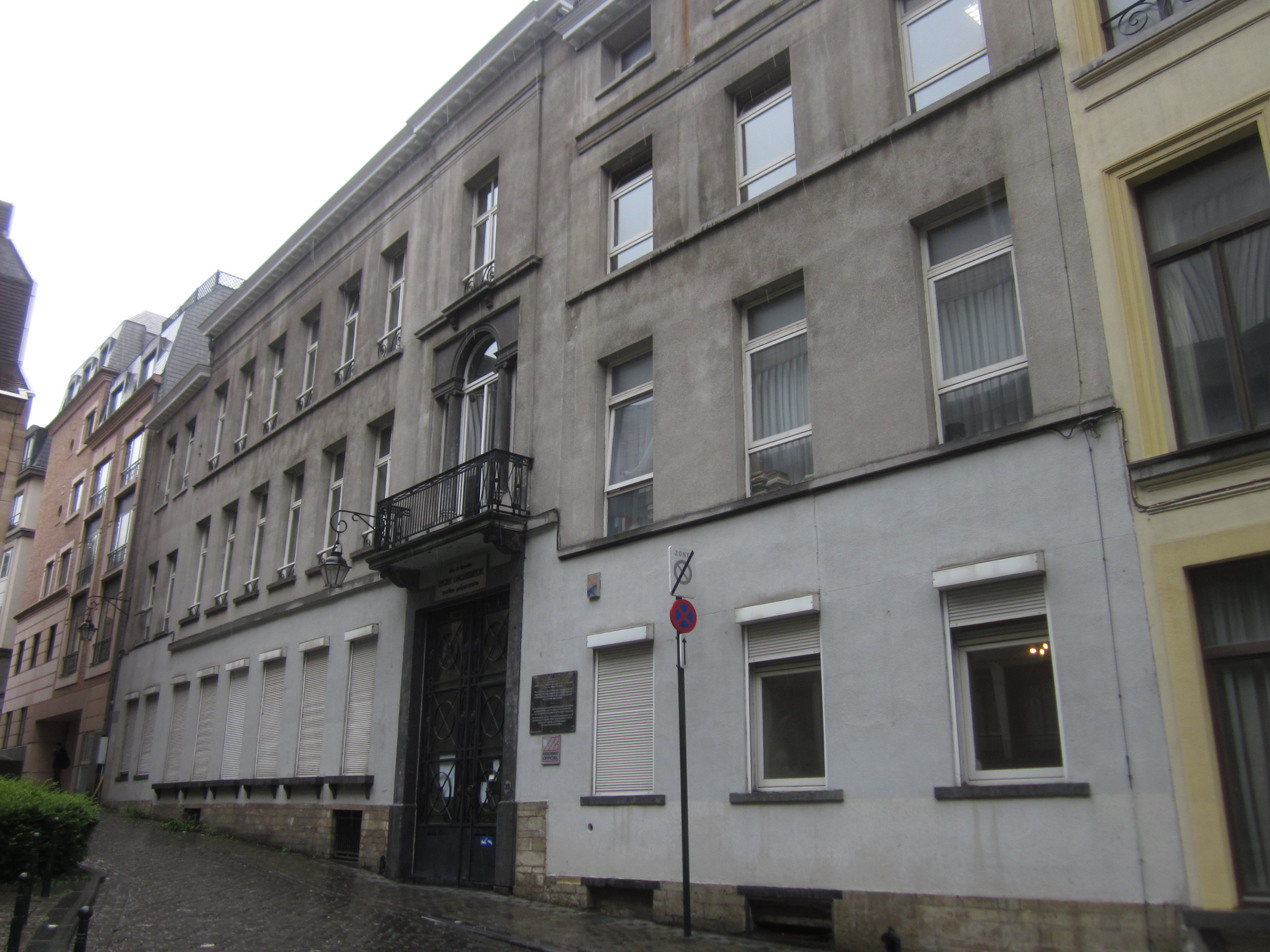
Ferdinand Wellens' print works at the rue de Ruysbroeck in central Brussels where the Faux Soir was produced on the night of 6/7 November

The most tricky part was to ensure the circulation. One of the reasons that Le Soir was chosen was that the paper was distributed in the afternoon at about 4 pm. Often, employees and workmen would have left work and be lining up outside the kiosks at the moment when the Le Soir was delivered; this situation was ideal for making quick sales of Faux Soir. The FI's knowledge of distribution times permitted it to drop the 100 copies at about the right time. To allow all the copies to be sold, various plans were made for delaying the distribution of the real Le Soir. The British were asked to fly over Brussels on the afternoon of the 9th, which would trigger an air raid warning and delay the printing of Le Soir. This would have the additional effect of emphasising the support that the FI received from the British. However, the British did not reply to the request. This led to a plan for sabotaging Le Soir's delivery vans.

By 27 October, the ingredients of the false publication had been assembled: the title flan, the articles, the photos, even the cartoon, announcements and the obituaries, which were all written by enthusiastic participants. On the weekend of 30 October to 1 November, the paper was put together in Wellens' workshop. Wellens' linotypist, Julien Oorlinckx, worked throughout the weekend. The following week, the van sabotages were organised: at 3:30pm, a few young partisans would throw incendiary devices into the vans parked in front of the Le Soir buildings. Théo Mullier would arrange to confuse the firefighting, and these measures together would delay the distribution of Le Soir enough for the operation. On 6 and 7 November the paper was printed by Wellens' machinery. The copies were carefully cropped to remove indentations which could act as a fingerprint to trace the copies back to their machine of origin. The printing went on through the night of Sunday, and finished at about 3 am on Monday 8 November.

== The final straight, and the circulation ==
On 8 November, the 5,000 copies set for direct distribution were issued at three distribution centres in Brussels based at cafés. Tens of volunteers left at set times to deliver their 100 copies to kiosks. However the news was not good. London had not responded to the request for overflight, and no-one had managed to contact the partisans who were to organize sabotage of the vans. A second sabotage was improvised, involving some youths who were participating in the distribution.

On 9 November at about 3:30pm, some youths tried to set fire to the vans. However a passer-by gave the alert, and the sabotage was foiled. At 4pm, the distribution of Faux Soir began. The bundles of 100 papers, tied with a banner explaining the absence of the usual number of copies, were dropped in the kiosks where the people of Brussels were awaiting their newspaper. The issues sold quickly without event. The customers went away, some of them starting to read their papers and stopping suddenly; glancing quickly around them, they folded their papers and retreated, astonished and eager to read the rest. In certain trams, to the great joy but also concern of the passengers, bemused readers loudly declaimed extracts from the paper. Everyone rushed to acquire a copy, as the deliveries of the real Le Soir arrived at the kiosk to the complete disbelief of the salesmen. Certain outlets were spooked, and stopped selling Faux Soir. Others offered their buyers a choice between the real and the fake one.

== Aftermath ==
The following day, the 10 November, the British Royal Air Force, a day late, performed the raid requested by Brussels. In the days which followed, the Faux Soir gave great joy throughout Belgium. The 45,000 copies printed by the FI "for sale" sold quickly. Some copies went for as much as 1,500 or 2,500 francs. 10,000 copies were distributed throughout Europe thanks to Dr. Marteau, the delegate of the FI in London. The paper was reproduced in facsimile and had a comical effect throughout Europe.

The reaction of the Germans and the collaborators was quite the opposite. The inquiry was charged to the Gestapo and ultimately identified the press machinery from which Faux Soir had originated. Wellens, Mullier, Oorlinckx and the machine operator Henri Vandevelde were all arrested. Wellens and Mullier never returned from the camp where they were taken. Somewhat later on, Aubrion was arrested; he was given a death sentence which was commuted to 15 years in prison. In all about 15 people were arrested and sentenced to penalties ranging from four months (for distribution) to five years.

== Commemoration ==
The Belgian postal service issued a commemorative stamp for the 50th anniversary of the Faux Soir in 1993.

== Content of Faux Soir ==
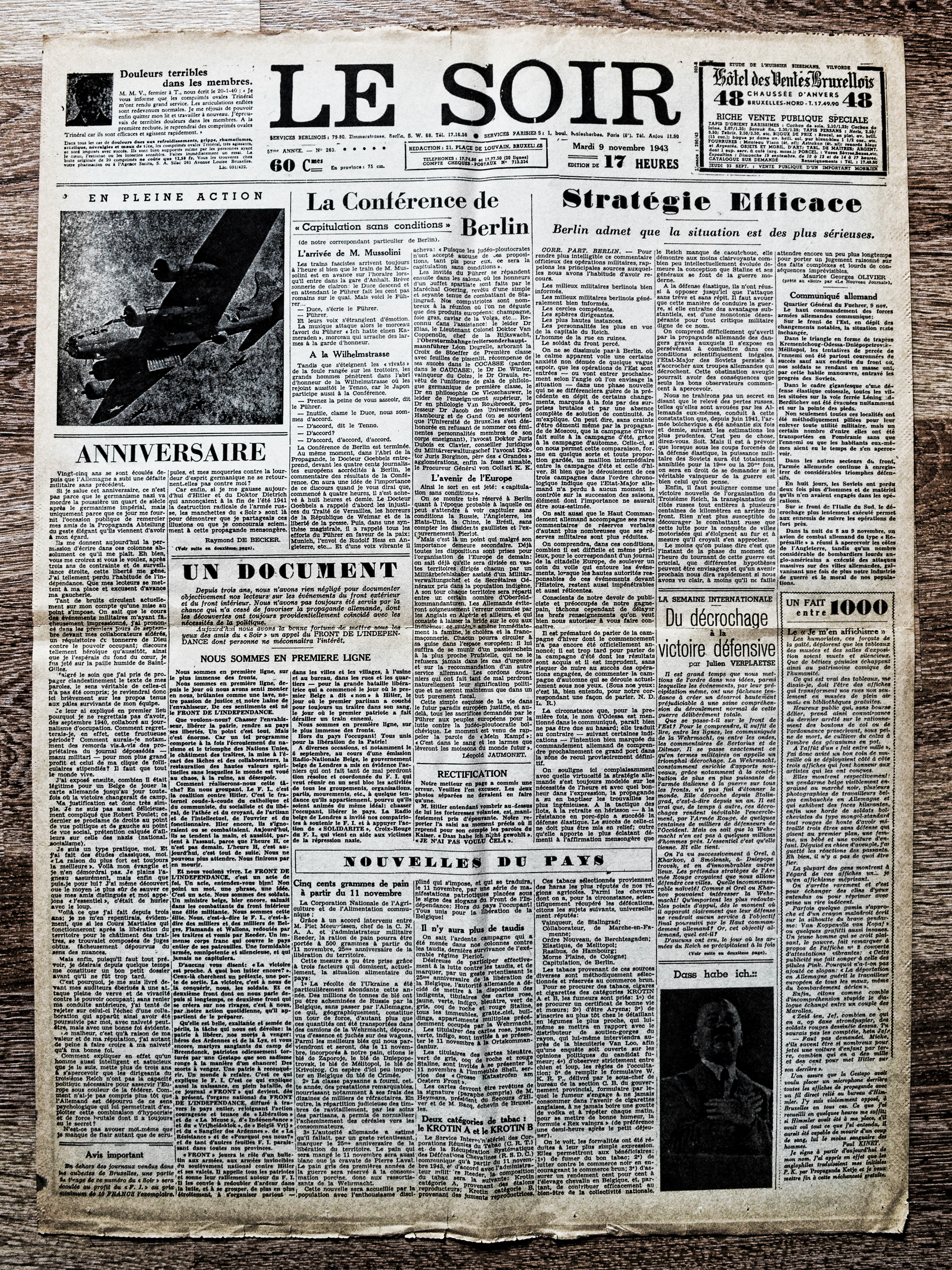
Front page French-speaking Belgian newspaper "Faux Soir" November 9, 1943

The reader's first surprise was on page one, which displayed two photos, while Soir volé usually had no more than one. The first photo, in the top left, showed bombers with the title of "in the middle of action". A quick inspection revealed the unbelievable: the rosettes of the bombers were stars (they were American B-17 "Flying Fortresses"). In the bottom right, a second photo showed Adolf Hitler with his arms on his waist, and his eyes raised to the heavens, saying "Das habe ich...". The mystery of the two photos was clarified in a note which explained:

Our typesetter has made an error. The two separate photos should have been just one. M. Hitler, hearing flying fortresses zooming above him, had clearly taken fright. Our reporter captured him in the exact moment where he had borrowed the Kaiser's words "Das habe ich nicht gewohlt" (I didn't want that).

Moreover the titles of the first pages, as in the rest of the paper, seemed bland enough, for example "Effective Strategy", where the author strove to imitate the convoluted prose of Maurice-George Olivier, a collaborationist journalist who was a mouthpiece of propaganda communications for the people:

It is no secret in Berlin, where an apparent calm veils a certain anxiety not bereft of a vague hope that operations in the East have entered – or are about to enter depending on the angle from which one views the situation – a new phase which is hardly different from the present phase, except with certain changes. ... One could say, without fear of being contradicted even by Moscow's propaganda, that, thanks to the autumn campaign, the winter campaign followed the summer campaign. ... So the course of these three campaigns in order shows that the German general staff have not lost at any time control over the sequence of the seasons, an element whose importance should not be underestimated. It is also known that the German High Command accompanies its rare comments with verbal reserves, which become more numerous as its military reserves become more reduced.

He goes on to satirize enemy propaganda, poking fun in passing at the military concepts of hedgehog defense and elastic defense:

The tactics of flows, hedgehog-retreat and porcupine resistance have been succeeded by elastic defense. The success of this should not be put into relief; beyond the fact that it brings the most striking rebuttal to the misrepresentation that the Reich lacks rubber, it also demonstrates in the least penetrating manner how little intellectually evolved is the idea that Stalin and his generals have of modern warfare. Up till now, they have not been able to oppose elastic defense, except through attack without truce or respite. It should be stated that this manner of conducting warfare, notwithstanding its substantial advantages, is desperately monotonous for any military critic worthy of the name. It is hard to understand ... the general staff of the Soviets persists in hanging forward to the German troops who pick back. This blind obstinacy could have consequences, as good observers alone are beginning to perceive.

Another first-page article was the "German communiqué":

On the Eastern Front, despite notable changes, the situation remains unchanged. In trapezium-shaped Krementchoug-Odessa-Dnipropetrovsk-Mélitopol triangle, the enemy's attempts at penetration have been crowned with success everywhere, except in the places on the front where our soldiers have impeded the Soviet advance by the clever manoeuvre of surrendering en masse. In the structure of a colossal elastic defense, all towns have been evacuated by night and on tip-toe.

In other sectors of the front, the German army continues to record considerable defensive victories. In eight hours, the Soviets have lost twice as much men and material as they had engaged in their operations.

During the night of 8 and 9 November, a German "reprisal"-type combat aircraft managed to catch sight of the English coast as a considerable number of Anglo-American heavy bombers executed massive attacks on German towns, galvanising at once both our war industry and the morale of our population.

Finally, under the title "International week" and the subtitle "From picking back to defensive victory", Faux Soir drove the point home by asserting that:

What German high command is interested in is neither the Kremlin, nor the Bolshevik izbas nor the inaccessible centre of Piccadilly Circus ... the Wehrmacht has brought home, over the course of the last twelve months, the most striking defensive victory ever recorded in history.

From the classified section, to the obituaries and the advertisements, each paragraph was a farce aimed at one or another collaborationist, or hinting at the government in exile or the country's liberation.
