= Michel Moors =

WWII member of the Belgian Resistance

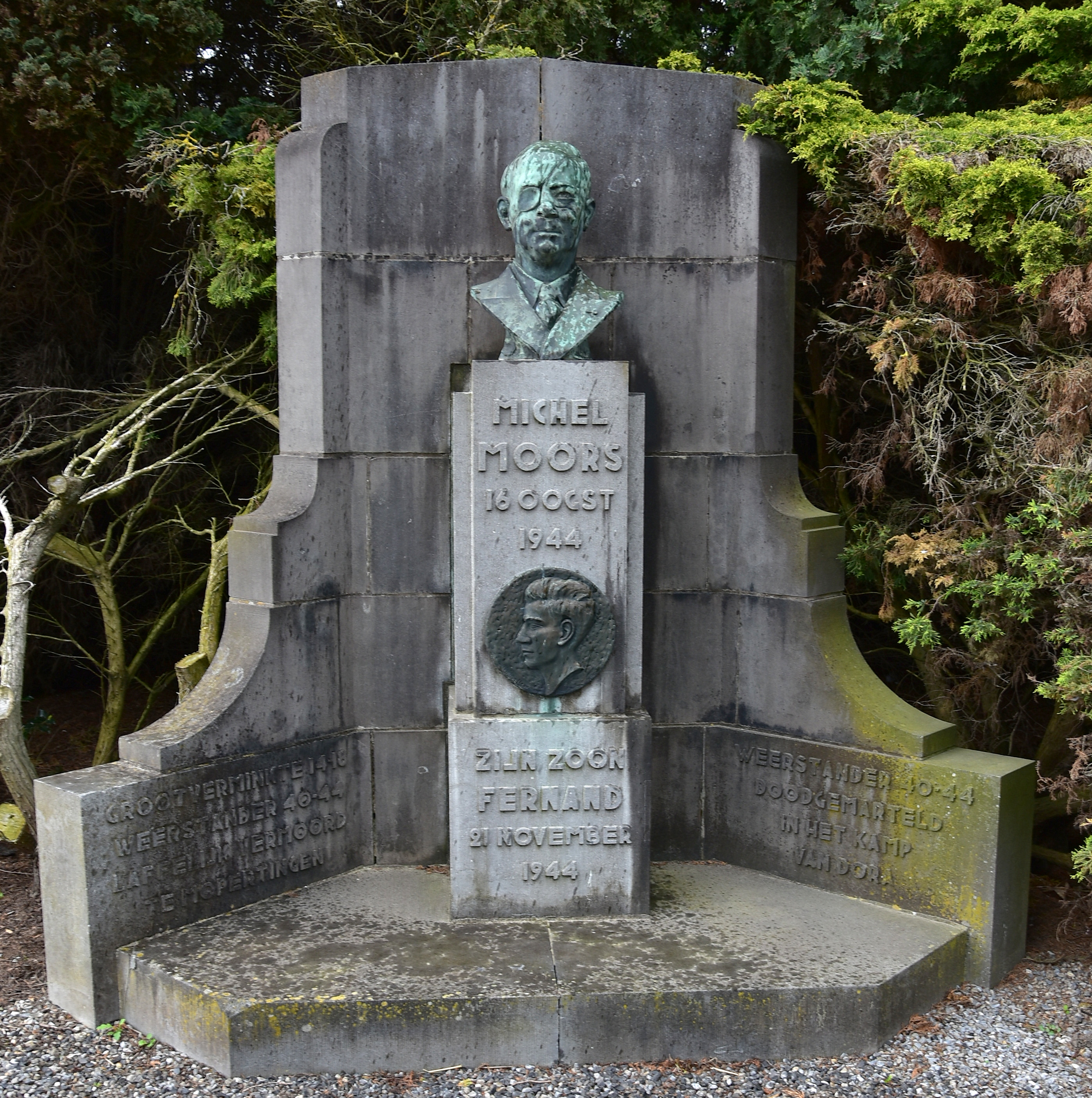
Memorial in Mopertingen for Michel Moors and his son Fernand

Michel Moors (October 28, 1894 – August 16, 1944) was a member of the Belgian Resistance in WWII. He was killed by collaborators, and his son Fernand Moors died in the Dora-Nordhausen concentration camp. A monument to them both stands on Maastrichterstraat, 3740 Mopertingen in Limburg, Belgium.

== See also ==
- National Museum of the Resistance in Anderlecht, Belgium
- Belgium in World War II
- Free Belgian Forces
- Österreichische Freiheitsfront
