= Fernande Volral =

Belgian resistance fighter in World War II

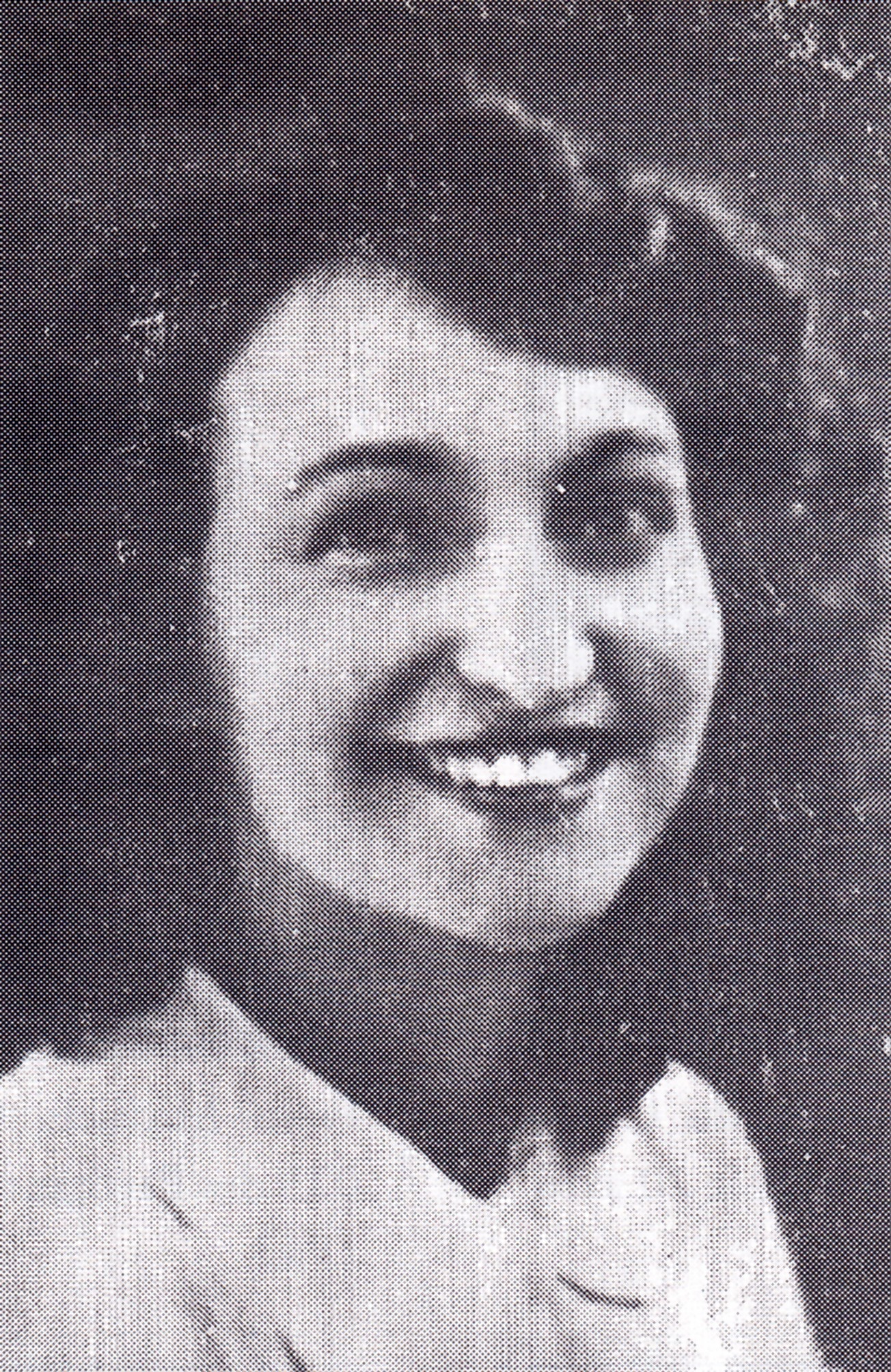
- Born: 7 October 1920; Champigneulles, France
- Died: 7 August 1944 (aged 23); Wolfenbüttel, Germany

Fernande Volral (7 October 1920 – 7 August 1944) was a Belgian resistance fighter during World War II who was murdered in a German prison.

== Biography ==
Fernande Volral was born in Champigneulles, France, near Nancy, in October 1920. During the 1930s her family moved to Charleroi, in Belgium. When she became an adult, she moved to Jette, launching a career in fashion.

In 1941 she met Raoul Baligand, the leader of the Partisans Armés, and joined the Belgian underground resistance. She originally served as a liaison agent, before joining the 10 de la rue de la Perle de Molenbeek-Saint-Jean group. The group was affiliated with the Front de l'Indépendance, which mainly consisted of Italian anti-fascists who had fought in the International Brigades during the Spanish Civil War.

In late 1942 she led a number of successful sabotage missions with the group.

On 23 February 1943 she was betrayed to the fascist authorities. When German police came to arrest her at her home, she fought back, wounding one before being subdued.

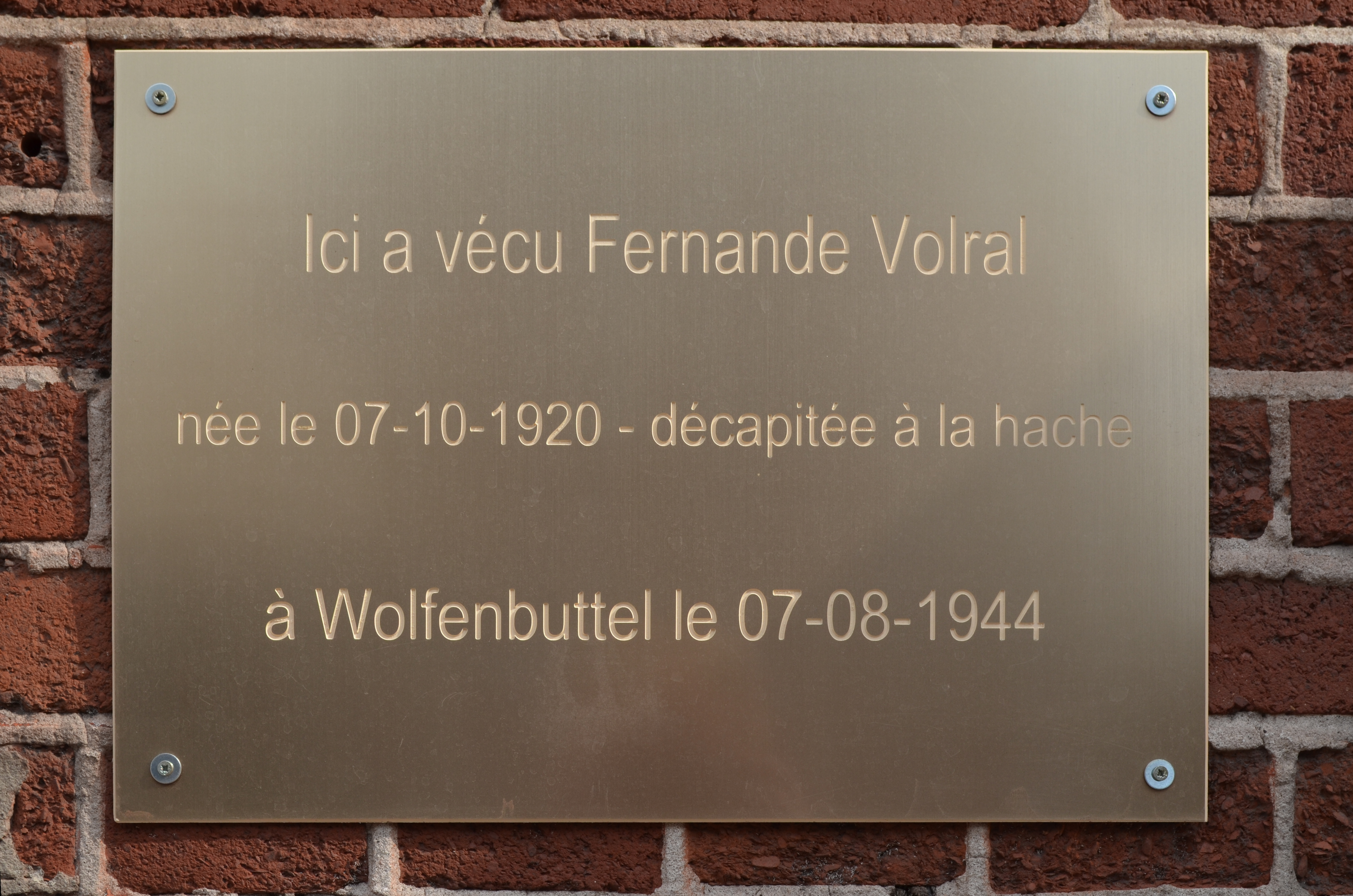
Plaque on the Avenue des Alliés in Charleroi.

She was imprisoned in Saint-Gilles Prison until being deported to Germany to be held in a prison in Leer and to be tried by the People's Court. Her trial was held on the same day as that of Marguerite Bervoets, and both women were issued with the same sentence: death. She was then transferred to Wolfenbüttel, where she was executed by beheading in early August 1944.

== Legacy ==
- In 1955 the town of Jette named a road after her
- A commemorative plaque about her was placed on the Avenue des Alliés in Charleroi in 2003
- A road in Charleroi was named after her in August 2020
