= National Museum of the Resistance =

Military museum in Brussels, Belgium

- Musée national de la Résistance (French); Nationaal Museum van de Weerstand (Dutch)
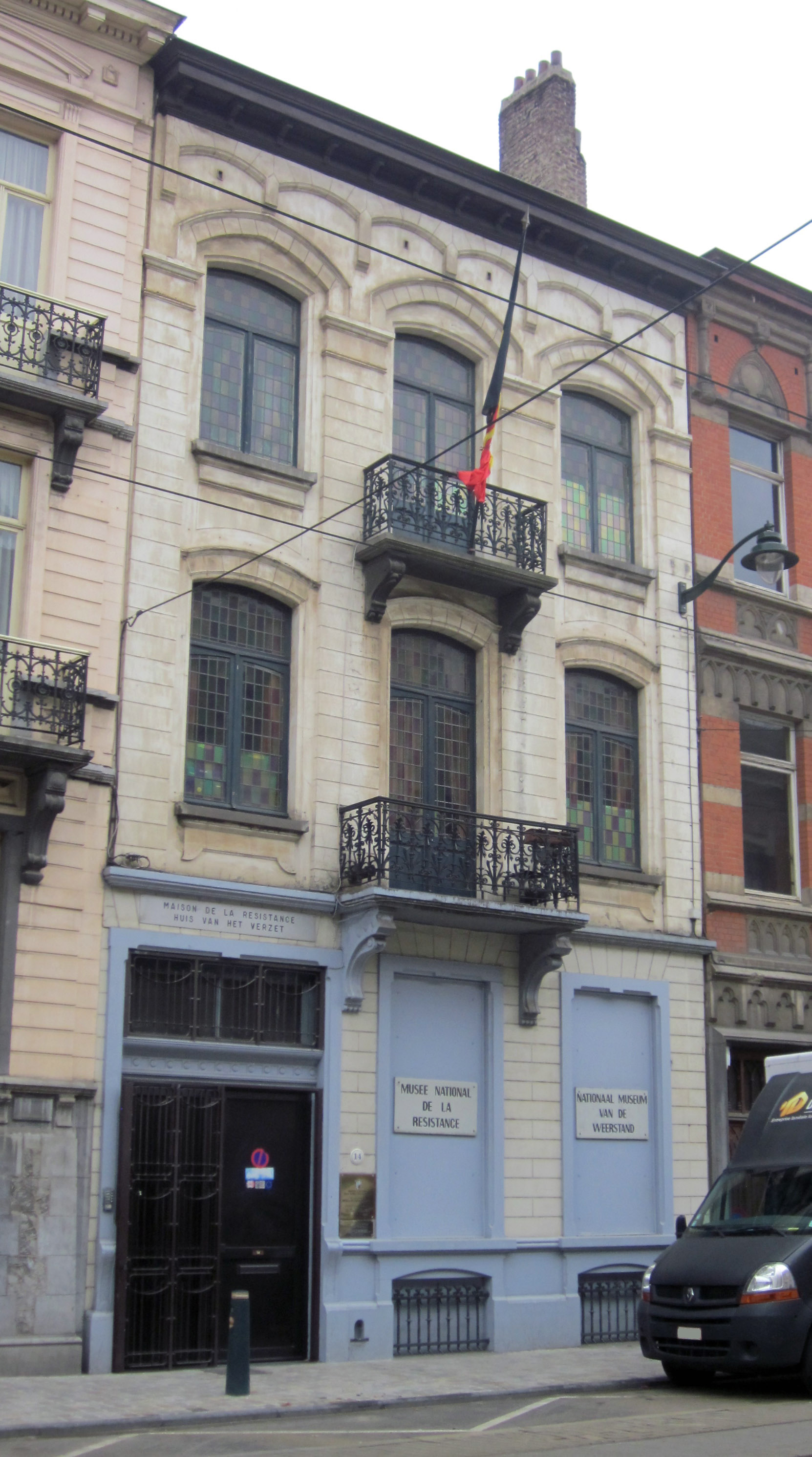
- Exterior of the museum
- Interactive fullscreen map
- Established: 6 June 1972; 54 years ago
- Location: Rue Van Lint / Van Lintstraat 14B, 1070 Anderlecht, Brussels-Capital Region, Belgium
- Coordinates: 50°50′22″N 4°19′41″E
- Type: Military museum
- Public transit access: 2 6 Clemenceau
- Website: www.museumresistance.be/en

The National Museum of the Resistance (French: Musée national de la Résistance; Dutch: Nationaal Museum van de Weerstand) is a museum in Anderlecht, a municipality of Brussels, Belgium, tracing the history of the Belgian Resistance and German occupation of Belgium during World War II. It was founded in 1972 by former members of the Independent Front (FI/OF), a faction in the Belgian Resistance.

The museum is located at 14b, rue Van Lint/Van Lintstraat in the Cureghem/Kuregem district of Anderlecht, next to the Municipal Hall, in the building where the photographs for the Faux Soir newspaper was produced during the occupation.

== History ==
=== Origins ===
The museum was created by former members of the Independent Front (FI/OF), a left-wing faction of the Belgian Resistance in German-occupied Belgium during the Second World War. This organisation had been founded in March 1941 by Dr Albert Marteaux of the Communist Party of Belgium, Father André Roland, and Fernand Demany, another communist, with the aim to unite Belgian Resistance groups of all opinions and political leanings, although the only political party formally affiliated was the Communist Party. The FI/OF operated significant propaganda, social, and paramilitary networks in addition to its military and sabotage activities, and it operated in competition with the larger pro-government Secret Army.

After the liberation of Belgium, the FI/OF was marginalised for opposing the government-ordered disarmament of Resistance members in November 1944 and by the context of the Cold War. In 1946, former FI/OF members founded the "House of the Resistance" to preserve the FI/OF's heritage and pass on the memory and ideals of the Belgian Resistance. By the early 1970s, the FI/OF remained active through its social network for former Resistance members and their families, political lobbying with the International Federation of Resistance Fighters (FIR), and numerous regional branches. Its former underground newspaper, Front, continued publication as a weekly and later as a quarterly magazine.

=== Current museum ===
The National Museum of the Resistance was inaugurated on 6 June 1972. Its location, at 14b, rue Van Lint/Van Lintstraat, was not chosen by chance. Firstly, it is situated in the heart of the working-class and former Jewish quarter of Cureghem/Kuregem, next to Anderlecht's Municipal Hall and close to the National Memorial to the Jewish Martyrs of Belgium, inaugurated two years earlier to commemorate the victims of the Holocaust in Belgium. Secondly, it had recently been donated to the House of the Resistance to house the national office of the FI/OF, previously located on the Rue du Taciturne/Willem de Zwijgerstraat. Thirdly, comprising both a street-front town house and a semi-industrial photoengraving workshop at the rear, it offered the necessary space for the project. Finally, it held historical significance, as its former owner, Pierre Lauwers, had been involved in producing the photographs for the Faux Soir clandestine newspaper of 9 November 1943, one of the major and emblematic acts of the Belgian Resistance.

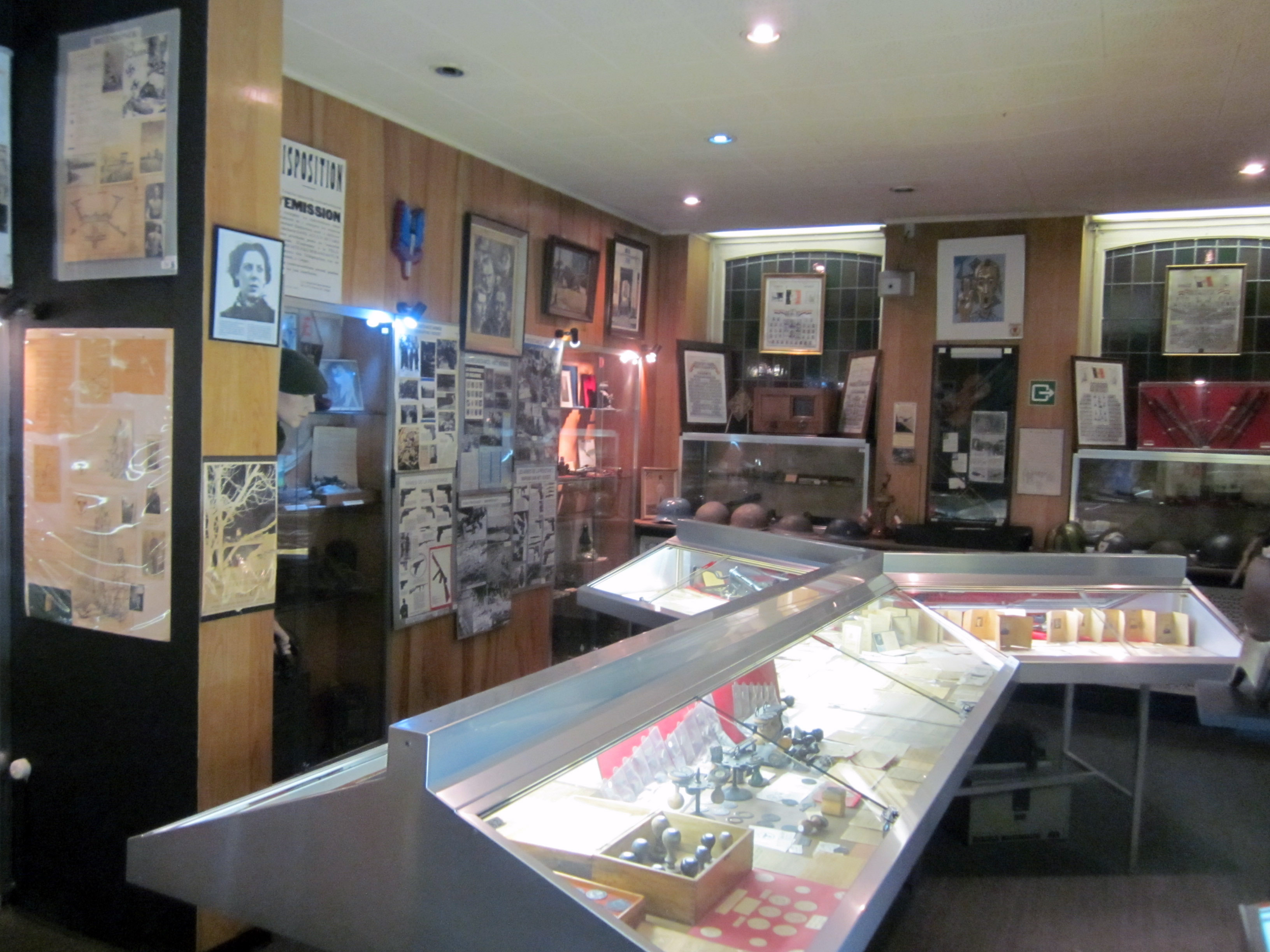
The interior of the museum in 2013, shortly before its major renovation

The museum faced challenges due to the FI/OF's political positions, its limited ecumenical approach, its nonprofit structure, and the gradual death of its founding members. To address this, several attempts were made to forge closer ties with the Royal Museum of the Armed Forces and Military History. A plan to transfer the collections, archives, and library to the Cinquantenaire/Jubelpark site itself, in 1985, ultimately failed. Nevertheless, the museum actively participated in major exhibitions dedicated to the Resistance, notably I was 20 in 1945, organised to commemorate the 50th anniversary of the end of World War II.

From 1959, the museum developed close ties with Soviet cultural and diplomatic institutions, assisting the Soviet embassy in identifying Russian participants in resistance activities on Belgian soil and locating their possible graves, then starting in 1968, cataloguing Belgians who had helped Soviet citizens during the war. This collaboration culminated in 1987 with the creation of a "section dedicated to the heroic struggle of the Soviet people against the Nazis". This space, officially named the "Hall of the Great Patriotic War", was donated by the Soviet Minister of Culture and installed by the embassy in a previously unoccupied area on the museum's first floor. It featured photographs, artefacts, and panels, highlighting Soviet Resistance and wartime losses.

In the early 2000s, to mark the 60th anniversary of the liberation, two research programmes were launched in partnership with the Study and Documentation Centre for War and Contemporary Society (CegeSoma) and the Institut d'histoire ouvrière, économique et sociale (IHOES). The first focused on the FI/OF's history, and the second on the museum's modernisation. Two small halls, dedicated respectively to women in the Resistance and the Spanish Civil War, were added on that occasion. A new planned transfer of the collection to the Cinquantenaire Museum, in 2003, also collapsed, though parts of the archive were deposited at Kazerne Dossin in Mechelen and CegeSoma, whilst the remainder, including the recognition dossiers, remained at the museum. The death of the FI/OF's national secretary, Michel Vanderborght, in 2010, marked the end of the era of direct witnesses.

== Future ==
In 2018, major renovation work began as part of the "House of Resistances" project. The updated museum aims to preserve its original mission whilst broadening the historical theme to include contemporary issues, as well as promoting civic engagement. The building is being fully redesigned by the FP architectural firm to create a modern and welcoming space for the public. Alongside the permanent WWII exhibition, an interactive space, called "Factory of Resistance", will offer a cross-cutting and philosophical approach to the subject. Ongoing donations and testimonies continue to enrich the collection, providing a representative view of all Resistance groups and networks in Belgium. The museum was scheduled to reopen in 2023, before being postponed to 2023, and finally 2025.

== Presentation ==
The museum seeks to raise awareness of the role of the Belgian Resistance during both world wars and preserves documents and artefacts relating to the period. It especially touches on the German occupation during World War II, the Holocaust in Belgium and deportations of prisoners of war during that conflict.

A direct emanation of the Belgian Resistance movements grouped in the Resistance Action Committee (CAR-ARW), the museum houses objects and documents from Resistance members, including militaria, printing equipment, radio devices, underground press, pamphlets, newspapers, posters, false papers and stamps, uniforms, flags, and relics from the camps, illustrating their clandestine activities, commitment, and the repression they faced.

In addition to Belgian war history, a room in the museum is also reserved for testimonies of wars suffered by other European countries, such as the Spanish Civil War (1936–1939), the interwar period (1918–1939), as well as the former Soviet Union in World War II (1941–1945). The museum is not only a place for historical heritage about war, but also serves as a place to commemorate wars and to spread a message of peace.

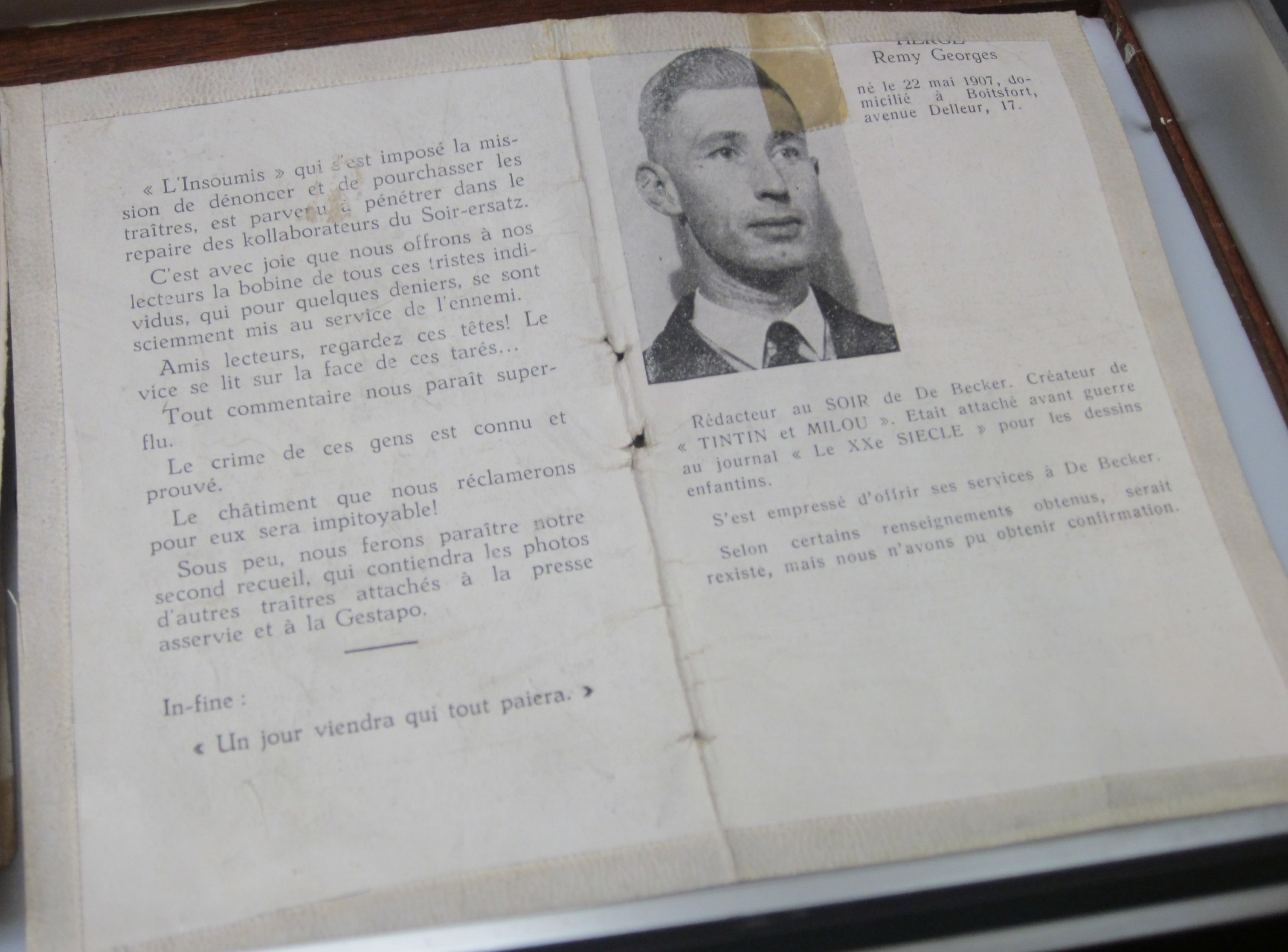
Section from the book Galerie de Traitres. The page open deals with Georges Remy [sic] (actually Georges Remi, aka Hergé), condemned as a collaborator.

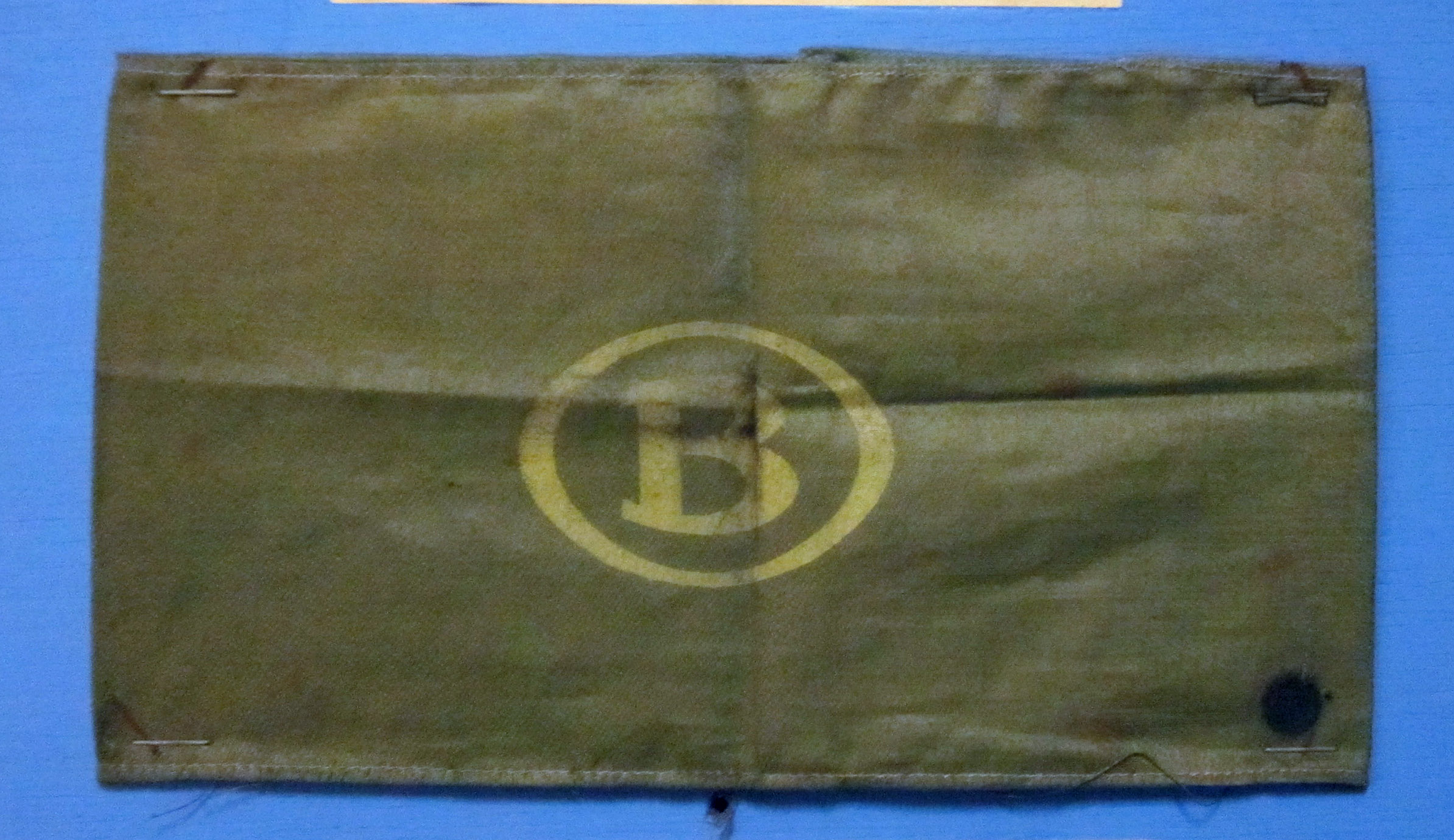
World War II armband worn by resistance members within the National Railway Company of Belgium (NMBS/SNCB)

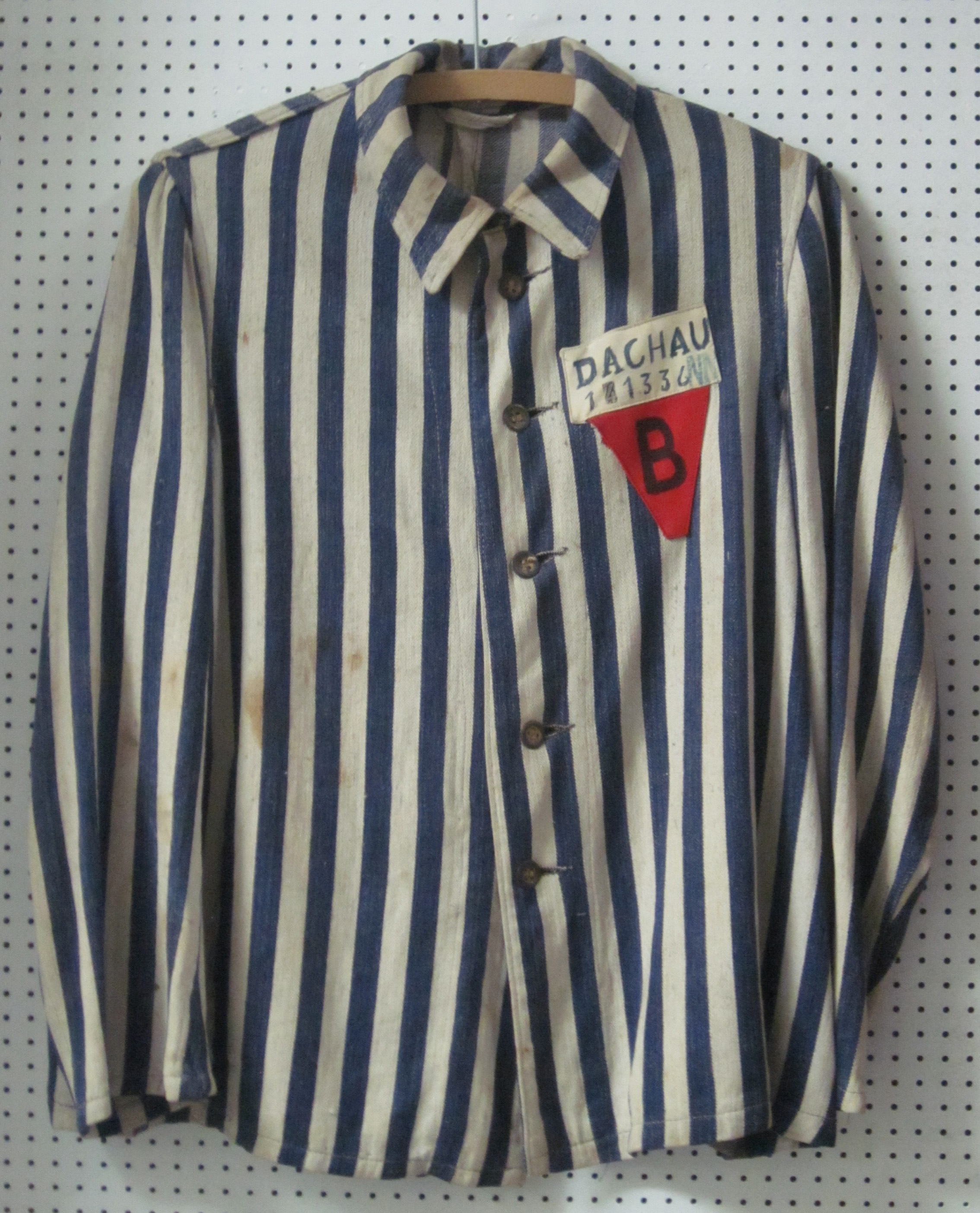
Striped uniform of a Belgian political prisoner (denoted by the "B" in a red inverted triangle) in Dachau concentration camp

== See also ==
- List of museums in Brussels
- History of Brussels
- Culture of Belgium
