= Stolpersteine in Charleroi =

Memorial installation in Belgium

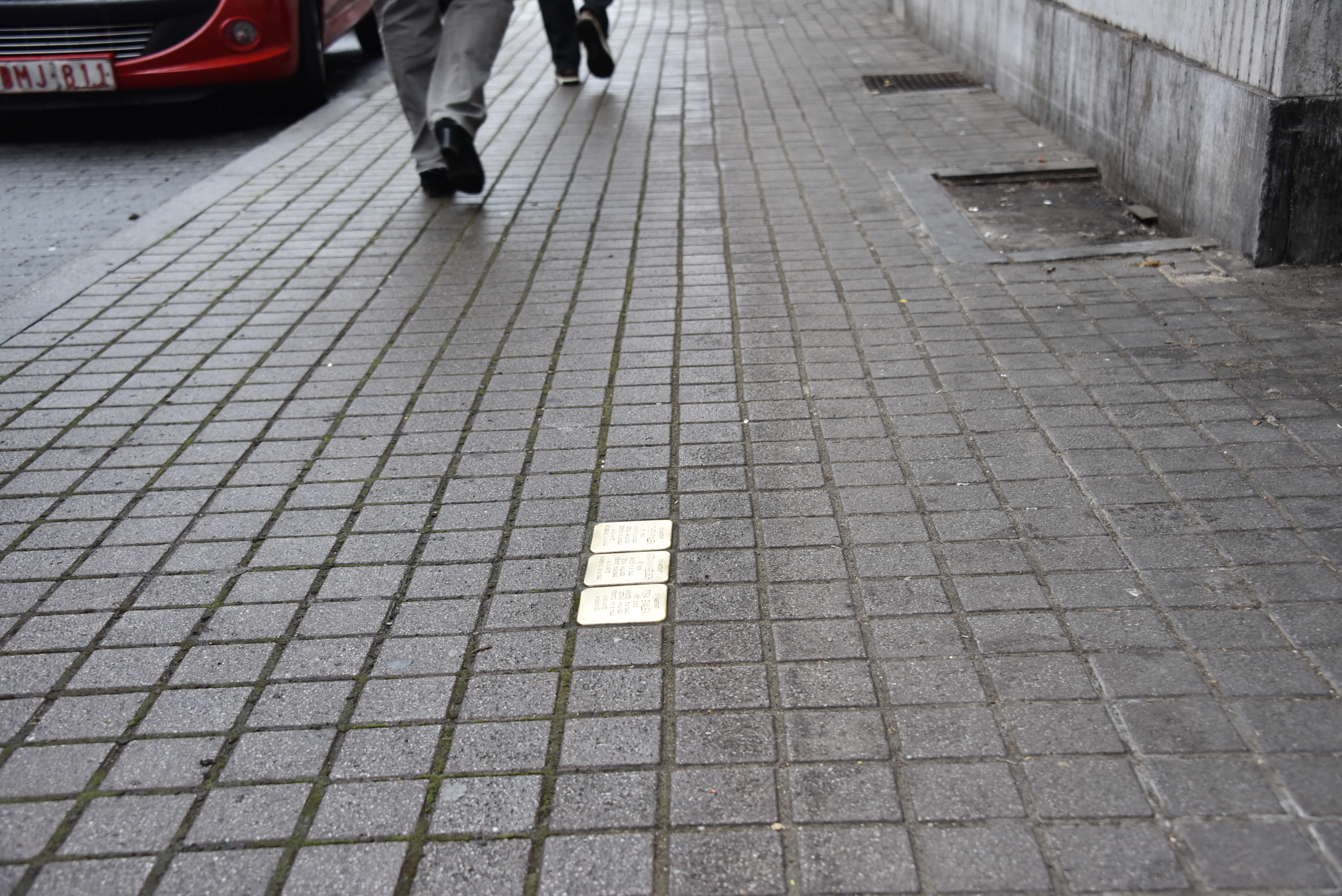
Stolpersteine in Rue de la Régence, 60 for Abraham Keusch, Nuchem and Rosa Bialek

This article describes all Stolpersteine that have been placed in Charleroi, Belgium. Stolpersteine is the German word for stumbling blocks placed all over Europe by German artist Gunter Demnig. They remember the fates of people who were murdered, deported, exiled or driven to suicide by the Nazis.

Generally, the stumbling blocks are placed in front of the building where the victims had their last self-chosen residence. In Wallonia, Stolpersteine are generally called pavés de mémoire (memorial cobblestones). In Dutch they are called Struikelstenen.

== Jewish community of Charleroi ==
Until the end of the 19th century, Charleroi had very few people of the Jewish faith. The Jewish community of Charleroi only developed in the aftermath of World War I. This community consisted mainly of poor families from Eastern Europe, who arrived in great despair and were desperately looking for work and survival. Charleroi was one of four Belgian cities that hosted sizeable groups of Jews, the others being Antwerp in Flanders, Liège in Wallonia and the capital Brussels. While the mines and industries were mainly looking for blue collar workers, the Jews tried to establish themselves mainly as craftsmen or with small businesses. Step by step, the Rue Chavannes became the focal point of a small Jewish Quarter, with small shops in Rue Neuve, Rue de la Régence and Boulevard Bertrand, with grocers, butchers, restaurant owners, hairdressers or shoemakers. In 1928, the existence of the Community Israelite of Charleroi was recognised through a Royal Decree.

However, in the 1930s the severe economic crisis endangered the Jewish community, and was followed by the rise of extremism. In 1933, Hitler captured power in Germany. In 1936, in Belgium, 21 right-wing members of parliament were elected. As World War II began in late 1939, Belgium was invaded on 10 May 1940. The country was forced to capitulate on the 28th of the same month. Thereafter Jews were confronted with several restrictions. On 29 August 1941, Jews were confined to four cities: Antwerp, Brussels, Liege, and Charleroi. In September 1942. Charleroi became victim of a raid and a convoy left for deportation. In summer 1942, Mechelen transit camp was set up and the Holocaust in Belgium started to take place with deportations from Mechelen to Auschwitz concentration camp. Altogether, 26 trains departed from Mechelen, bringing around 25,000 Jews and 350 Roma to extermination camps in the East, mostly to Auschwitz. Parallel to the deportations, opposition among the general population against the treatment of Jews in Belgium grew. Although the people did not have reliable information about the Holocaust, they sensed that something terrible was happening and started to hide Jewish men, women and children. By the end of the occupation, more than 40 percent of all Jews in Belgium were in hiding; many of them were helped by Gentiles, particularly Catholic priests and nuns, others by the organised resistance. The Comité de Défense des Juifs (CDJ, Jewish Defence Committee) provided food and refuge to Jews in hiding. In turn, many Jews joined the armed resistance. In April 1943, members of the CDJ attacked the 20th convoy to Auschwitz and rescued some of those being deported. Nevertheless, more than 24,000 Jews were killed before the camps were evacuated and/or liberated by the Allies, i.e. more than a third of all Jews living in Belgium in 1939.

In the aftermath of Nazi occupation and WWII, the Jewish community of Charleroi was severely weakened. Many were murdered, while some escaped and went into exile. Though most of those who had left Belgium never returned, a small Jewish community still exists today in Charleroi. In 1963, a new synagogue was inaugurated in Rue Pige-au-Croly, the only one in the province of Hainaut. The building also houses the Museum of the Memory of the Righteous among the Nations. The community is also involved in GRAIR, a group that furthers interreligious dialogue.

== List of Stolpersteine ==
Stone	Inscription	Location	Life and death
	HERE LIVED; NUCHEM BIALEK; BORN 1898; ARRESTED 1.8.1942; DETAINED IN MALINES; DEPORTED 11.8.1942; AUSCHWITZ; MURDERED 4.9.1942	Rue de la Régence, 60; 50°24′49″N 4°26′48″E	Nuchem Bialek was born on 8 March 1898 in Częstochowa, Poland. His parents were Idel Bialek and Sura née Lieberman. He married Dresel. The couple had at least two children: Rosa, born in 1920, and Léon. Rosa married Abraham Keusch. He and his stepson were arrested on 1 August 1942, his daughter six days later. They were all detained at Malines and deported to Auschwitz concentration camp on 11 August 1942. There, Nuchem Bialek was murdered by the Nazi regime on 4 September 1942. His daughter and his stepson were also killed. The fate of his wife is unknown. His son survived the Shoah. The Stolperstein for Nuchem Bialek was created and collocated upon the request of Léon Bialek.
	HERE LIVED; ROSA BIALEK; BORN 1920; ARRESTED 7.8.1942; DETAINED IN MALINES; DEPORTED 11.8.1942; AUSCHWITZ; MURDERED	Rue de la Régence, 60; 50°24′49″N 4°26′48″E	Rosa Bialek was born in 1920 in Łódź, Poland. She was the daughter of Dresel and Nuchem Bialek. During the Nazi regime she lived and worked as a tailor in Charleroi, Belgium. She was married to Abraham Keusch. She was arrested on 7 August 1942, detained at Malines and then — together with her husband and her father — deported to Auschwitz concentration camp on 11 August 1942. There she was murdered by the Nazi regime. Her father and husband were murdered in Auschwitz. The Stolperstein for Rosa Bialek was created and collocated upon the request of her younger brother Léon Bialek, who had survived the Shoah.
	HERE LIVED; FRYMETA GINSBERG; BORN 1912; DETAINED 1943 MALINES; DEPORTED 1944; AUSCHWITZ; MURDERED	Rue de l'Energie, 64; 50°23′28″N 4°27′00″E	There are two narratives of life and death of Frymeta Ginsberg: According to the Stolperstein, she was born in 1912, detained at Malines in 1943, deported to Auschwitz concentration camp in 1944 and murdered there by the Nazi regime. According to Yad Vashem, Frizmeta Wislitski née Ginsberg was born on 1 May 1899 in Łódź. In Hebrew her first name is פריזמטה, an automatic translation procures the name Frumet. She was married to Michel Wislitski. The couple had a son, Maurice, who survived the Holocaust. ″Prior to WWII she lived in Belgium. During the war she was in Charleroi, Belgium.″ She was killed in Auschwitz on 31 October 1942. The higher credibility goes to Yad Vashem as the report about her death was filed by her son, Maurice. He mentions a transport to Auschwitz from 31 October to 9 November 1942. Nevertheless, there are also mistakes in his version and in the version of Yad Vashem. It is correct, that on 31 October 1942 two transports left the Mechelen transit camp, generally called Malines. According to Danuta Czech, transports XVI and XVII consisted of 1696 persons. 777 were registered as inmates and 919 were immediately murdered in the gas chambers. However, Czech and several other sources claim that both transports had already arrived on 3 November 1942. Therefore, Frizmeta and Michel Wislitski were either killed on this day or later. Neither survived the Shoah.
	HERE LIVED; FELDON IZRAEL; BORN 1889; ARRESTED 1.8.1942; DETAINED MALINES; DEPORTED 11.8.1942; AUSCHWITZ; MURDERED	Rue Chavannes, 38; 50°24′52″N 4°26′44″E	Feldon Izrael was born in 1889. He was arrested on 1 August 1942, detained at Malines and deported to Auschwitz concentration camp on 11 August 1942. There he was murdered by the Nazi regime. The Stolperstein for Feldon Izrael was created and collocated upon the request of Léon Bialek.
	HERE LIVED; ABRAHAM KEUSCH; BORN 1919; ARRESTED 1.8.1942; DETAINED MALINES; DEPORTED 11.8.1942; AUSCHWITZ; MURDERED 28.8.1942	Rue de la Régence, 60; 50°24′49″N 4°26′48″E	Abraham Keusch was born in 1919 in Sniatyn, Poland. His parents were Mendel Keusch and Perel née Zilber. He was married to Rosa Bialek. During the Nazi regime he lived and worked in Charleroi, Belgium. He was arrested on 1 August 1942, detained at Malines and deported to Auschwitz concentration camp on 11 August 1942. There he was murdered on 20 or 28 August 1942 by the Nazi regime. The Stolperstein for Abraham Keusch was created and collocated upon the request of Léon Bialek, the younger brother of Keusch's wife, who had survived the Shoah.
	HERE LIVED; ABRAHAM KIBEL; BORN 1900; ARRESTED 7.8.1941; DETAINED CITADELLE HUY; BREENDONCK; DEPORTED 15.1.1943; AUSCHWITZ; MURDERED	Rue Marie Danse, 39; 50°25′10″N 4°27′05″E	Abraham Kibel, also Abram, was born on 14 January 1900 in Poland. He was the son of David Kibel and Celda née Celnik. He married Gitla née Berenholc, also called Jenny. The couple had at least one daughter, Mariette. There is a little discrepancy about his profession: According to the Yad Vashem report about his death, he worked as a street vendor (marchand ambulant). According to the Yad Vashem report about his wife and daughter the ″family's firm″ had employees. He was arrested on 7 August 1941, detained at Citadelle Huy Breendonck, deported to Auschwitz concentration camp on 15 January 1943 and murdered there. Kibel's wife Gitla, and daughter Mariette, miraculously survived World War II with the help of two Belgian citizens Renée Bouffioux and Albert Halloy, hiding them, as well an aunt and a cousin of Mariette in the village of Aiseau, about 15 Kilometers east of Charleroi. Both saviors were declared Righteous Among the Nations on 27 June 1995. In 1999, Mariette reported the death of her father Abram Kibel to Yad Vashem and thereby unveiled the address of her work place in Brussels.
	HERE LIVED; JOSEK MACHNOWSKI; BORN 1904; ARRESTED 11.1.1943; DETAINED MALINES; DEPORTED 15.1.1943; AUSCHWITZ; MURDERED	Rue de la Régence, 65; 50°24′50″N 4°26′49″E	Josek Machnowski was born in 1904 in Pomiechówek, Poland. He was the son of Wolf Machnowski and Sura née Slucka. He correct first name was Joseph. He was a colporteur and he married Bina Gutmer (8 April 1901 – 20 December 1968). The couple had at least one son, Maximilien, who survived the Shoah. in 1943, Josek Machnowski was deported to Auschwitz concentration camp. There he was murdered by the Nazi regime. His death was reported to Yad Vashem by his son in 2007. In the paper Maximilien Machnowski added his current address in Brussels.
	HERE LIVED; OSCAR PETIT; BORN 1905; RESISTANCE FIGHTER; FRONT INDEPENDANCE; ARRESTED 28.3.1944; DEPORTED; ELLRICH; MURDERED 14.3.1945	Rue de la Régence, 37	Oscar Petit was born on March 23, 1905 in Marcinelle, Belgium. He was a pastry chef in Charleroi. When war broke out, he, along with his wife Eglantine Petit-Pierre, joined the Milices Patriotiques. On March 28, 1944, he and Eglantine were denounced by a Frenchman they had taken in, then he was deported Ellrich-Juliushüte, one of the most brutal subcamps of the Buchenwald concentration camp system, and murdered by the Nazi regime.
	HERE LIVED; EGLANTINE; PETIT-PIERRE; BORN 1907; RESISTANCE FIGHTER; FRONT INDEPENDANCE; ARRESTED 28.3.1944; DEPORTED; RAVENSBRÜCK; MURDERED 28.3.1945	Rue de la Régence, 37	Eglantine Petit-Pierre was born on April 21, 1907 in Braine-l'Alleud, Belgium. She was a pastry chef in Charleroi. When war broke out, she, along with her husband Oscar Petit, joined the Milices Patriotiques. On March 28, 1944, she and Oscar were denounced by a Frenchman they had taken in, then she was deported Ravensbrück and murdered by the Nazi regime.
	HERE LIVED; HERSZEK ROJTMAN; BORN 1907; ARRESTED 9/1942; DETAINED IN CHARLEROI JAIL; MALINES; DEPORTED 15.1.1943; AUSCHWITZ; MURDERED	Boulevard Paul Janson, 6; 50°24′54″N 4°26′44″E	Herszek Rojtman was born on 22 May 1907 in Stoczek, in Poland. His parents were Lajb Rojtman and Fajdla née Gutrejman. He became a tailor, married Rywka née Szmulewícz and established himself in Charleroi. He was arrested by German forces in September 1942. He was first detained at the prison of Charleroi, then in the Mechelen transit camp (also called Malines), thereafter deported to Auschwitz concentration camp and murdered by the Nazi regime in January or July 1943.
	HERE LIVED; MICHEL WISLITSKI; BORN 1898; FORCED LABORER; DETAINED IN FRANCE; DEPORTED 1942; AUSCHWITZ; MURDERED	Rue de l'Energie, 64; 50°23′28″N 4°27′00″E	Michel Wislitski was born in March 1898 in Warsaw, Poland. His parents were Herszel and Roza Wislitski. He was married to Frizmeta or Frymeta née Ginzberg. The couple had at least one son, Maurice, who survived the Shoah. According to the Stolperstein he was detained in France and deported to Auschwitz concentration camp in 1942. There he and his wife were murdered by the Nazi regime. The death of Michel Wislitski and his wife was reported to Yad Vashem by their son Maurice in 1984. In the paper he added his current address in Charleroi. In October 2014, when he took part at the collocation of the Stolpersteine, according to a local newspaper Maurice Wislitski lived in Israel. He also spoke about his father during the ceremony.

== Dates of collocations ==
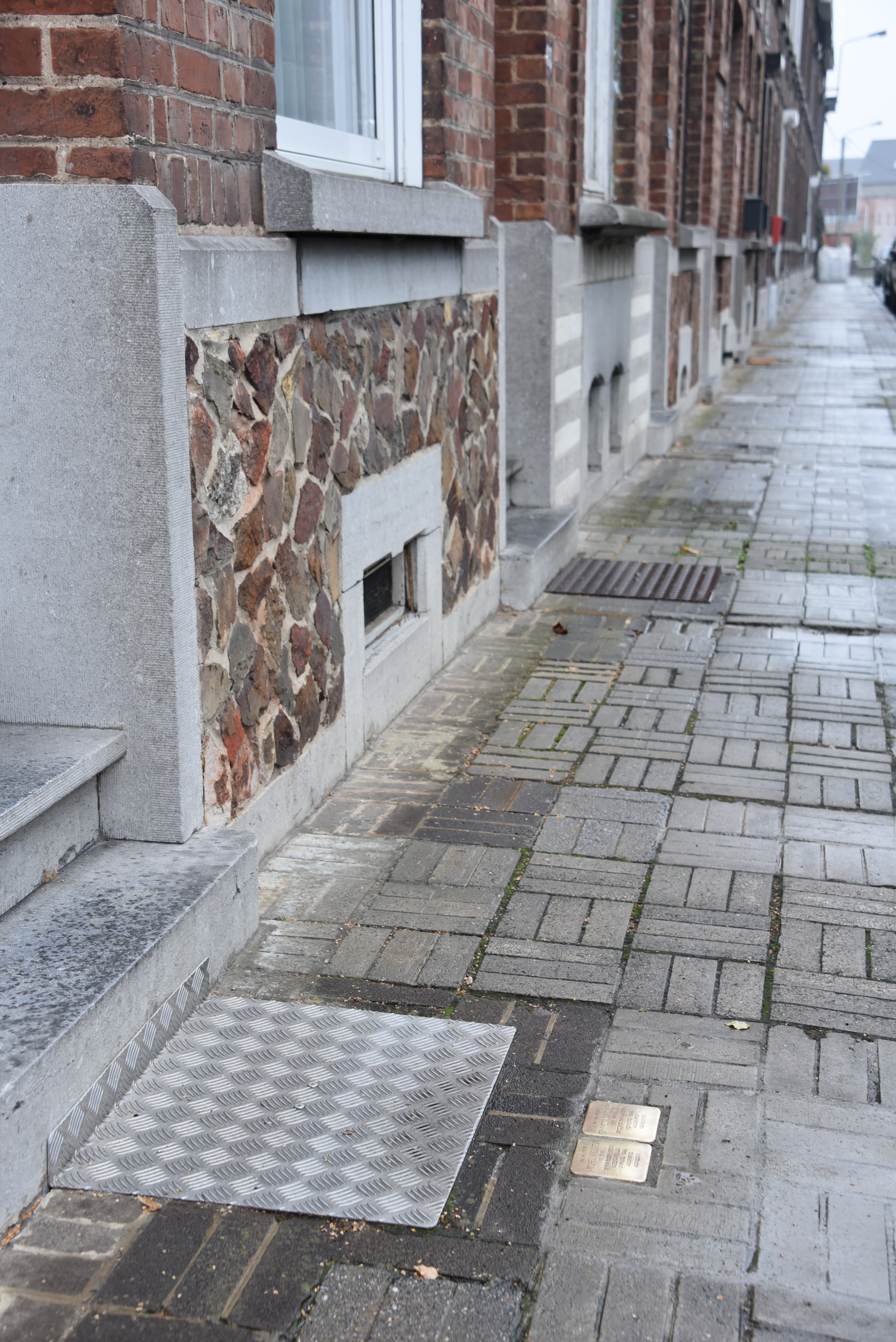
Stolpersteine for Frymeta Ginsberg and Michel Wislitski in Rue de l'Energie, 64 à Marcinelle

The Stolpersteine of Charleroi were collocated by the artist himself on the following dates:

- 23 June 2012: Abraham Kibel, Herszek Rojtman
- 23 October 2013: Nuchem Bialek, Rosa Bialek, Feldon Izrael, Abraham Keusch
- 29 October 2014: Frymeta Ginsberg, Michel Wislitski
- 15 February 2015: Josek Machnowski
- 10 February 2018: Oscar Petit, Eglantine Petit-Pierre

The initiative for the Stolpersteine came from the Association pour la Mémoire de la Shoah (Association for Remembering the Shoah, AMS), situated in Brussels.

== See also ==
- List of cities by country that have stolpersteine
- Stolpersteine in Belgium
