= Jean Elleinstein =

French politician and historian (1927–2002)

- Born: Jean Léon David Elleinstein; 6 August 1927; 12th arrondissement of Paris, French Third Republic
- Died: 16 January 2002 (aged 74); Pernay, Indre-et-Loire, French Fifth Republic
- Occupation: Historian
- Era: 20th century
- Organization: UJRF
- Political party: PCF
- Resistance
- Allegiance: KPB-PCB
- Branch: Milices Patriotiques
- Service years: 1944–45
- Conflicts: Liberation of France

Jean Elleinstein (6 August 1927 – 16 January 2002) was a French historian specialising in communism.

== Biography ==
Son of a small industrialist, Jean Elleinstein had to cross the demarcation line in 1941 and live illegally until 1944 when he joined the Milices Patriotiques (Patriotic Militia) in Megève. He joined the French Communist Party at the Liberation at the age of seventeen. He soon became a Party member, first as a journalist with the communist press agency, then at the PCF press office, before being assigned to the Mouvement Jeunes Communistes de France and the World Federation of Democratic Youth.

His activities against the Indochina war, caused him to spend a few weeks in prison in 1949, then sixteen months in hiding in 1952–53. He then resumed his studies, became a professor in 1954, passed the CAPES (diploma in teaching – secondary schools) in history in 1958, his diploma in teaching higher education in 1960 and was appointed lecturer. At the same time, he was responsible for the founding of the Union of Communist Students.

The 20th Congress of the Communist Party of the Soviet Union in 1956 and, in 1960–1961, the "Servin-Casanova affair" – named after two high-ranking Communist leaders sanctioned for their Khrushchevian theses – shook his convictions. A little marginal in the party, but strongly supported by Roland Leroy, Elleinstein used a freedom of tone that brought him closer to the Italian or Spanish communists. Appointed deputy director of the Center for Marxist Studies and Research, between 1972 and 1975 he published a 4-volume history of the Soviet Union (Histoire de l'URSS) in which he diverted substantially from the orthodox version that had been expressed since 1945 by Jean Bruhat. In line with the policy of openness of the time of the Union of the Left and Eurocommunism, his history was authorised by the PCF. Further exploiting his freedom to speake, in 1975 Elleinstein published History of the Stalinist phenomenon in which he analyzes Stalinism as the unfortunate product of historical circumstances.

The 22nd French Communist Party Congress in 1976 was marked by an attempted break with the Soviet system spearheaded by Jean Kanapa. Ellerstein became the non-official spokesman for a communism now redefined to be democratic and revised, with his book, Le PC, (the French Communist Party), and his Open Letter to the French people about a reformed republic based on the Programme commun, (Note: In French: Lettre ouverte aux Français sur la République du Programme commun.)

Following the failure of the Union of the Left in 1977 and the rapprochement of PCF leader Georges Marchais with Brezhnev, and especially in view of Ellerstein's regular contributions to Le Figaro Magazine, by the second half of 1980, the conventional wisdom among upper echelons of the PCF was "that he had ejected himself from the party" and that there was therefore no need to eject him formally.

== Bibliography ==
- The Revolution of Revolutions , Paris, Social Publishing, 1967.
- "History of the USSR", in 4 volumes: "The conquest of power, 1917–1921" (Paris, Social Publishing, Our time collection, 1972, 215 p.); Socialism in one country (Paris, Social Editions, 1973, 313 p.); "USSR at War, 1939–1946" (Paris, Social Editions, 1974, 236 p.); "The contemporary USSR" (Paris, Social Editions, 1975, 323 p.).
- "History of the Stalinist phenomenon", Paris, Grasset, 1975, 248 p.
- The PC , Paris, Grasset, 1976, 210 p.
- Letter open to the French on the Republic of the Common Program , Paris, Albin Michel, 1977, 215 p.
- A certain idea of communism , Paris, Julliard, 1979.
- Unexpected dialogue , with Thierry Maulnier, Flammarion, 1979.
- "History of Communism (1917–1945)", Paris, Janninck Edition, 1980, 158 p.
- They deceive you, Comrades , Paris, Pierre Belfond, 1981, 214 p. ISBN 2-7144-1376-5
- Marx, his life, his work , Paris, Fayard, 1981, 735 p.
- Jacques Grandjonc: "Jean Elleinstein: Marx, his life, his work, Fayard, Paris 1981" ("Cahiers d'Etudes Allemiques", University of Provence, Aix Center, 1982, 1 -15) German ( Wie eine Biographie von Marx nicht zu schreiben ist ) ( Beiträge zur Marx-Engels-Forschung 15 , Berlin 1984, p. 104-114)
- 'Stalin' ', Paris, Fayard, 1984, 575 p.
- "World History of Socialism", Armand Colin, 1984.
- Goliath against Goliath 1941–1949; the childhood of the Great , Paris, Fayard, 1986.
- The cold peace; history of US-USSR relations since 1950 , Paris, London, 1988.
- From one Russia to another, life and death of the USSR , Éditions Sociales, 1992, 763 p.

== Related article ==
- Kremlinology
