= Ellenstein =

Ellenstein is a surname. Notable people with the surname include:

- Meyer C. Ellenstein (1886–1967), Mayor of Newark, New Jersey from 1933 to 1941
- Rachel Ellenstein, a fictional character from the universe of Highlander movies
- Robert Ellenstein (1923–2010), American actor
- Sylvain Ellenstein, a fictional character

== See also ==
- Ellen Margrethe Stein (1893–1979), a Danish actress
- Elleinstein, a surname
