= Todor Angelov =

Belgian resistance member

Todor Angelov Dzekov
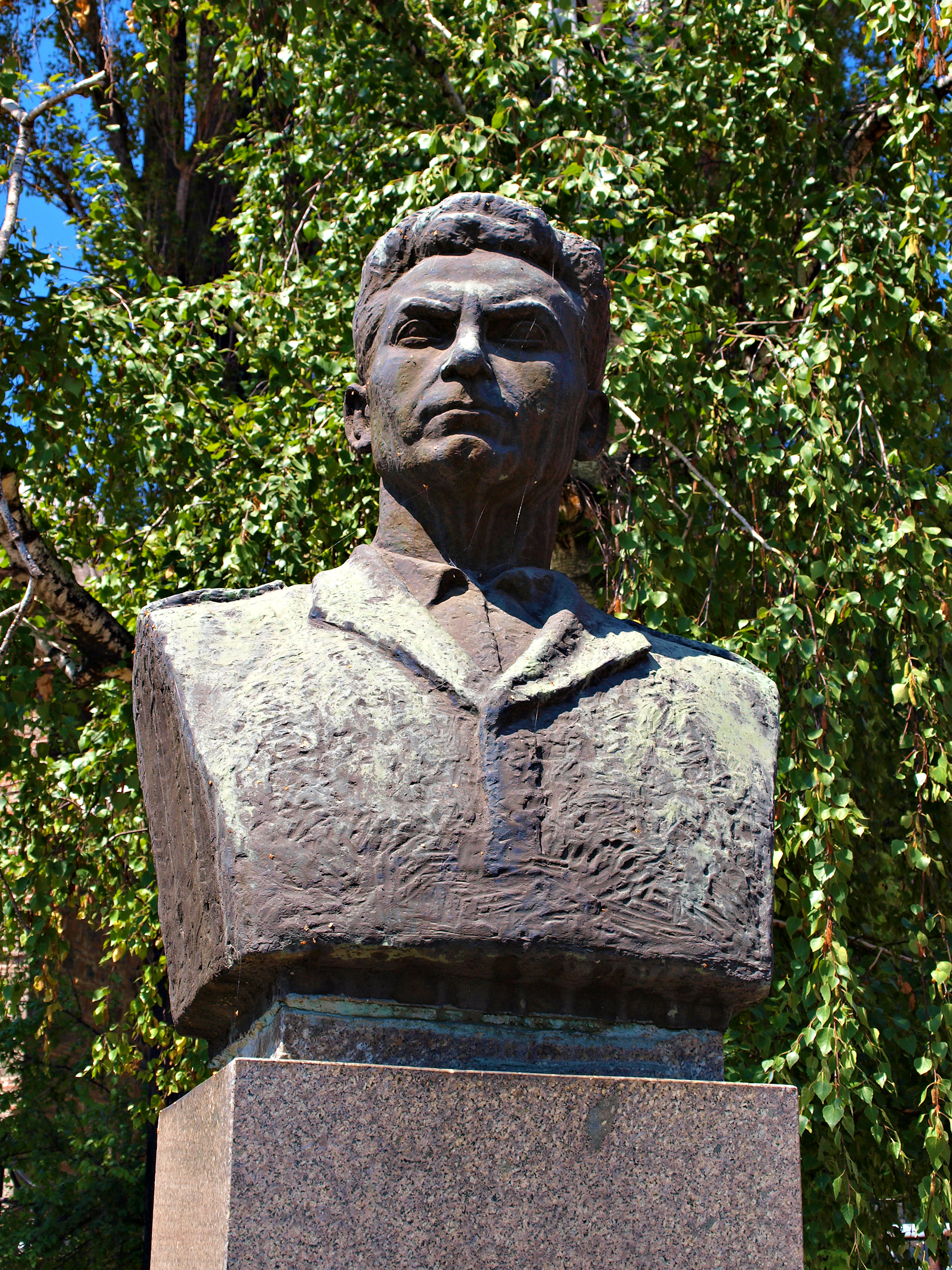
- Posthumous monument at Kyustendil, Bulgaria
- Born: Todor Angelov Dzekov; January 12, 1900; Kyustendil, Bulgaria
- Died: November 30, 1943 (aged 43); Fort Breendonk, Belgium
- Cause of death: Execution
- Known for: Member of the Belgian Resistance
- Spouse: Aleksandra Sharlandzhieva
- Awards: Order of Leopold

Todor Angelov Dzekov (Bulgarian: Тодор Ангелов Дзеков, rendered in French as Théodore Angheloff; 12 January 1900 – 30 November 1943) was a Bulgarian communist activist who lived in exile in Belgium for much of his adult life. He served in the Bulgarian Dimitrov Battalion during the Spanish Civil War. During the German occupation of Belgium, was a leader within the Partisans Armés as part of the Belgian Resistance. He was captured in January 1943 and executed in November 1943.

In Belgium, Angelov was an active supporter of the Communist Party of Belgium. In 1942, he organized a resistance group, the "Corps Mobile de Bruxelles", under the auspices of the "Partisans Armés" and associated with the "Front de l'Indépendance", the major Belgian underground movement.
