= Irma Schwager =

Austrian-Jewish politician (1920–2015)

- Born: Irma Wieselberg; 31 May 1920; Vienna, Austria
- Died: 22 June 2015 (aged 95); Vienna, Austria
- Occupations: Resistance fighter, politician and philanthropist

Irma Schwager (31 May 1920 - 22 June 2015) was an Austrian-Jewish anti-fascist resistance fighter and politician.

== Biography ==
Schwager was born on 31 May 1920 in Vienna, Austria. Schwager was forced to flee Austria in 1938 to Belgium and again to France in May 1940. After arriving in France, she was sent to Gurs internment camp before joining the French resistance. She was stationed in Paris and convinced German soldiers to turn against the Nazis before traveling to Belgium after the Liberation of Paris in 1944, to help found the Österreichische Freiheitsfront (Austrian Freedom Front). In early 1945, Schwager returned to Austria with her husband Zalel Schwager (1908-1984), a fighter of Spanish Civil War, and their daughter born during the war. She found that her parents and two brothers had been murdered in the Holocaust.

She joined the Communist Party of Austria (KPÖ) after the Second World War and became a politician. She became a member of the central committee in 1953, was a member of the political office of the KPÖ between 1980 and 1990, and was elected honorary chairman of the party in 2011. Schwager advocated pacifism and protested the use of nuclear power. She was nominated for a Nobel Peace Prize in 2005.

In January 2015, Schwager made a speech in Vienna to commemorate the 70th anniversary of the liberation of Auschwitz concentration camp.

Schwager died on 22 June 2015.
