= Antonina Grégoire =

Belgian business engineer, feminist and communist

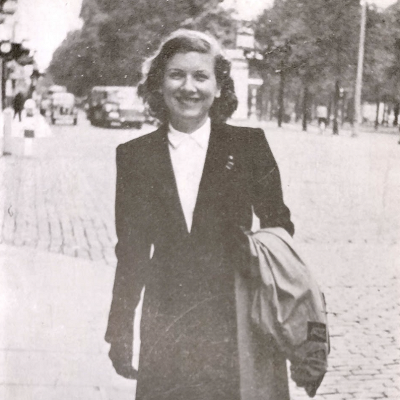
- Born: Antoinette Grégoire; January 23, 1914; Brussels
- Died: July 21, 1952 (aged 38); Ixelles
- Occupations: business engineer, feminist, communist, resistance fighter

Antonina Grégoire (23 January 1914 – 21 July 1952) was a Belgian business engineer, feminist and communist. She joined the Belgian Partisans Armés resistance during the Second World War, and ran an intelligence gathering section, then post war became involved in politics before being expelled from the Communist Party because of her "bourgeois origins".

== Early life and education ==
Antoinette Grégoire (known as Antonina) was born in Brussels on 23 January 1914 into a well-to-do family.

Grégoire was one of the first women to study business engineering (les études d'ingénieur commercial) at the Université libre de Bruxelles (ULB) where, in addition to her studies, she was heavily involved in student life. She was president of the General Assembly of Women Students in 1935 and vice-president of the Cercle du Libre-Examen, whose mission is to promote the values of free examination, advocating the rejection of authority in matters of knowledge and freedom of judgment. In this capacity, she led the General Assembly of Students to take a stand against measures which limited the work of married women, inspired by feminist teacher and biologist Germaine Hannevart. She was also a member of the student marxist group.

It was at ULB that she met and formed a lasting friendship with lawyer and later Resistance member, Andrée Grandjean. Grégoire graduated as a business engineer in 1935.

== Spanish Civil War and political activity ==
During the Spanish Civil War (1936-1939) Grégoire took a stand in favour of the Republicans and joined the Comité mondial des femmes contre la guerre et le fascisme (Women’s World Committee Against War and Fascism), one of around 2000 Belgian members. She became a member of the Parti communiste belge (Belgian Communist Party) and married the communist lawyer Jean Bastien (1901-1944) on his return from Spain in 1937.

She was active in International Red Aid, for which she carried out several missions. In 1938, with her friend Andrée Grandjean, she visited political prisoners incarcerated in the Moabit prison in Berlin, including Liselotte Herrmann, a German anti-Nazi activist sentenced to death. They tried in vain to meet Heinrich Himmler.

Grégoire joined the Belgian Banking Commission in 1938.

== Resistance work in Second World War ==
When her husband Jean Bastien was arrested at the end of 1940, Grégoire went into hiding. After his release, the couple met in Andrée Grandjean's home in the country.

Under the code name Béatrice, Grégoire was a national deputy from October 1942 to October 1943, then responsible until 1944 for the intelligence service within the 'Armée belge des partisans, in charge of gathering intelligence to support resistance actions carried out by the Partisans against military, economic or human targets.

After being betrayed in Verviers, Jean Bastien was arrested in Brussels on 19 January 1943. He was tortured during interrogation in the Nazi prison camp in Breendonk and then deported to Sachsenhausen concentration camp where he died on 29 November 1944.

== Post war ==
After the liberation, Antonina Grégoire became involved in politics within the Communist Party. She was elected to the Provincial Council of Brabant and became the head of the national party's technical commissions. However, in 1951, she was expelled from the Communist Party because of her bourgeois origins.

She married engineer and fellow Resistance member Jaques Wurth as her second husband. Antonina Grégoire died of cancer in Ixelles on 21 July 1952.
