= Ledeberg =

Sub-municipality of the city of Ghent, Belgium

- Sub-municipality of Ghent
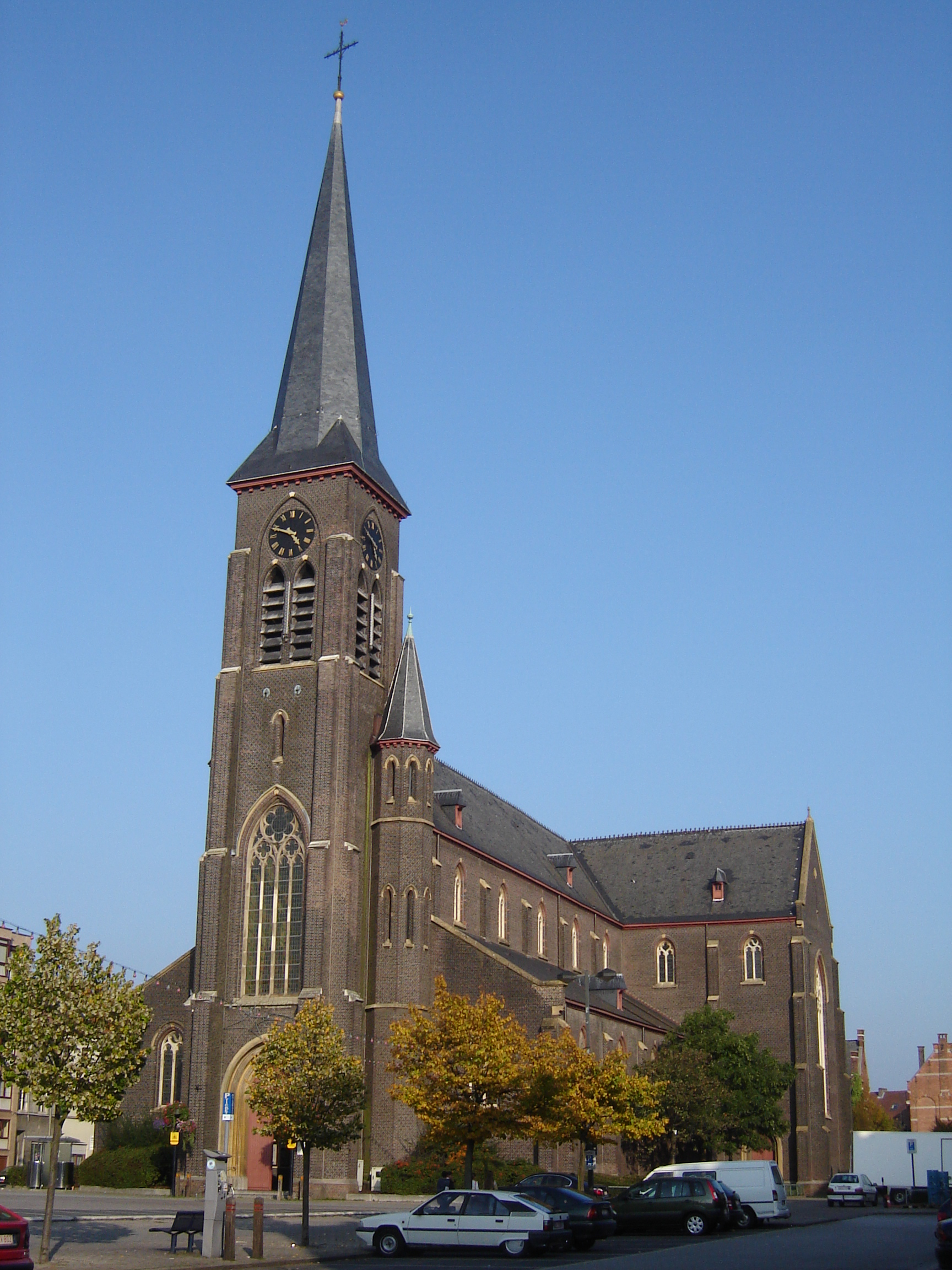
- Church of Saint Livinus

- Coat of arms

- Location of Ledeberg in Ghent
- Interactive map of Ledeberg
- Location within Belgium Location within East Flanders
- Coordinates: 51°02′15″N 3°44′33″E
- Country: Belgium
- Community: Flemish Community
- Region: Flemish Region
- Province: East Flanders
- Arrondissement: Ghent
- Municipality: Ghent

Area
  - Total: 1.09 km^{2} (0.42 sq mi)

Population (2020-01-01)
  - Total: 16,530
  - Density: 15,200/km^{2} (39,300/sq mi)
- Postal codes: 9050
- Area codes: 09

Ledeberg (Dutch pronunciation: [ˈleːdəˌbɛr(ə)x]) is a sub-municipality of the city of Ghent located in the province of East Flanders, Flemish Region, Belgium. It was a separate municipality until 1977. On 1 January 1977, it was merged into Ghent.

== Notable people ==
- Jean Fonteyne (1899–1974) lawyer, resistant, politician and filmmaker
