= Van Acker I Government =

Belgian national government

The Van Acker I Government was the government coalition in the Kingdom of Belgium from 1945-1946, after the fall of Hubert Pierlot's 6th coalition government in the aftermath of the Second World War. The government, with Achille Van Acker of the Belgian Socialist Party as Prime Minister, served for four months; from the restoration of democracy until June 15, 1945. Van Acker would form another coalition, which would serve for six months until the 1946 Belgian general election.

== Context ==
In the immediate aftermath of World War II, reconstruction was a priority for societies that had been occupied, including Belgium. This proved to be a complicated task. The Government of Hubert Pierlot, which had been in exile in the United Kingdom during the war, returned to the country following the Liberation of Belgium in 1944. Pierlot, exhausted from the years in London, wanted to resign, but stayed in power until the situation in the country normalized further. On February 7, following a request for a cabinet reshuffle, Pierlot announced the resignation of his government without a parliamentary vote. Achille van Acker, a relatively unknown politician at the time, took the place of Pierlot as head of government. He was joined by Paul-Henri Spaak, one of the few exiles from London who maintained their ministerial position in van Acker's government because he was one of the few who did not oppose the participation of the Belgian Communist Party in the Parliament.

== Chronology ==
On February 8, 1945 Prince Charles, Regent of Belgium invited socialist Achille Van Acker to form a new government.

The first Van Acker government served rom February 12 to June 15, 1945 a short four month period.

== Resignation of Pierlot government ==
The Van Acker government succeeded the Hubert Pierlot government, which had governed the country prior to World War II.

Brussels was liberated in September 1944. Pierlot, exhausted from exile in London, did not want to return to his previous position at the time. However, he quickly understood that he would have to stay in his role until the situation on the ground in Belgium had normalized.

The country was entirely liberated in February 1945. On February 7, after having received a proposition to reshuffle his cabinet which he had previously refused, Pierlot announced the resignation of his government without waiting for a parliamentary vote.

Achille van Acker, a bourgeois librarian and relatively unknown politician took the place of Pierlot as head of government. He was joined by Paul-Henri Spaak, one of the few exiles from London who kept their ministerial post, largely because he was not opposed to the participation of the communists.

== Composition ==
Van Acker's coalition was a national unity government, necessary in fragile times like the aftermath of World War II. It was composed of 18 ministers. Van Acher was both Prime Minister and Minister of Mining.

Paul-Henri Spaak became Minister of Foreign Affairs and International Trade. The Belgian Communist Party received two cabinet positions, Minister of Health and Minister of Food (an important ministry, given postwar food shortages).

Minister	Name	Party
Prime Minister and Minister of Mining	Achille Van Acker	PSB-BSP
Minister of Foreign Affairs and International Trade	Paul-Henri Spaak	PSB-BSP
Minister of Communications	Ernest Rongvaux	PSB-BSP
Minister of Public Works	Herman Vos	PSB-BSP
Minister without Portfolio	Paul Kronacker	PL-LP
Minister of Information	Edmond Ronse	Union catholique
Minister of Justice	Charles du Bus de Warnaffe	Union catholique
Minister of the Interior	Adolphe Van Glabbeke	PL-LP
Minister of Public Instruction	Auguste Buisseret	PL-LP
Minister of Agriculture	Louis Delvaux	Union catholique
Minister of Finance	Gaston Eyskens	Union catholique
Minister of Labour and Social Services	Léon-Éli Troclet	PSB-BSP
Minister of Economic Affairs	Albert De Smaele	Technocrat
Minister of National Defense	Léon Mundeleer	PL-LP
Minister of Health	Albert Marteaux	PCB-KPB
Minister of Colonies	Edgard De Bruyne	Union catholique
Minister of Food	Edgard Lalmand	PCB-KPB
Minister for Victims of War	Henri Pauwels	Technocrat

== Program ==
The government began with a speech to open the Parliamentary session, delivered in the Chambers on February 14, 1945. This speech distinguished the points the government considered important in times of war and the policy objectives it wished to pursue in the legislature.

Van Acker began his speech by affirming his resolve that the government would respond to the country's will and make the most of the war effort.

The Prime Minister announced during his speech that the coal industry in Belgium would be one of his top priorities, telling the chamber "Coal to Belgium is just as important as bread".

The government also pledged to make advances in the social security system in Belgium. In the next two months, he worked to give the Kingdom a law that legalized joint committees between workers and professional organizations to ensure equality.

On the question of unemployment, the government instituted a system of "preparatory employment registration of all citizens between 16 and 45 years old" in order to achieve their assigned goals. On this issue, the government aimed for civil mobilization for specific categories of workers whose professional activities were most important for their plans. The first priority was the war effort, then the harmonious return of economic life (including the good functioning of the government and the survival of the population).

The government wanted to bring particular attention to middle class merchants. Their plight was of particular concern for the government. The government's speech aimed to support and encourage growth in the middle class, with a view at organizing them better.

Policies were put into place to consolidate the financial sector. Regarding post-war food shortages, the government planned to work with their allies to increase food supplies, but asked the public to have goodwill toward one another and try to share equally.

On justice, the government wanted to try those who conspired with the Nazi regime, but also release those who had been put into custody by the regime.

Regarding the military, the government aimed to intensify the Belgian effort against the Nazis while also reorganizing a post-war army to be more effective.

The government pledged to create a "Council of the Resistance".

Finally, in terms of foreign policy, the Van Acker government hoped to unite with allies in peace and that ties with the united Allied nations would be strengthened. It also pledged to claim reparations against Germany for damages incurred during the war.

== Dissolution and the Royal Question ==
On May 7, 1945, a message announced the liberation of the Royal Family. They had left Austria and were waiting in Switzerland until they could return to Belgium. This news was not celebrated by many politicians and a segment of the general public. This marked the beginning of a crisis in Belgian politics known as the Royal Question.

In the last months of the war, the challenges were rising: the country had fewer people and economic and social recovery were necessities.

As May 22 got closer, the Socialist Party caucus adopted a motion in favor of the abdication of the King. On May 28, in a meeting between the Socialists, Communists, and left-leaning Liberals, Max Buset of the Socialists said that the abdication of the King was the only indispensable condition for justice. Then, during the National Congress of the Socialist Party on June 9 and 10, Paul-Henri Spaak reported on the progress of the government and insisted that an urgent solution be found.

After these meetings and the continued debate over the role of the King, Van Acker went to visit the monarch on June 14 and 15. The King shared his intention to return with Van Acker and tasked him with forming a new ministry. During this period, it seemed as if things were working out. The two men discussed a scenario in which he could come back.. The scenario was supposed to go as follows:

On Monday June 18, the King would return, Van Acker and his cabinet would submit their resignation to the King. On the 19th Van Acker would announce the King's return over the radio and that he would receive senior Belgian and foreign dignitaries. Finally, the King would deliver a speech (pre-written and approved by Van Acker) to Parliament.

However, the King's return did not go as planned. The Prime Minister returned to Brussels on June 15 as planned. the next day, he called a meeting of cabinet in which he explained the plan. However two days later on June 17, unable to reach agreement among cabinet members, Van Acker submitted the government's resignation to the "Regent". Because the King was not currently installed, there was no one to accept the terms of resignation, parliament was suspended. Therefore, until the King's return, the government was unable to address the people's problems.

Prime Minister van Acker summoned the King to convince him to approve a new government before his return. Van Acker tried to give the job to Attorney General Ganshof van der Meersch, who refused. As the situation worsened, Paul-Henri Spaak feared that the King would follow an abstentionist policy and allow time to run until future elections. It is in this heavy climate that Van Acker met with the King for the third time at the beginning of July to offer him two possible solutions. The first would be outright abdication. The second would involve the King participating in a parliamentary debate around two questions: his attitude during his interview with Hitler at Berchtesgaden and his actions and attitude during his exile.

As Spaak feared, the King wrote saying that he would not re-enter the country until a "popular consultation of the subject". By his words, the King did not return to Belgium, but also did not abdicate. While the Regent was obliged to keep the resignation of the government, this was no longer possible under the circumstances.

On July 17, 1945 Van Acker gathered members of parliament to the Chamber and read the letter the King sent to the Regent. At the end of the letter, the King mentioned that it was not for the King to determine his rule by his will alone. It was decided to interpret this line as a way to invoke Article 82 of the Constitution, suggesting that the King was unable to reign and that his reign had ended. The draft legislation passed the Senate the next day and was published on July 19, 1945. However, the law had a thundering effect on the Catholic Party, which called for the immediate resignation of the Government, which led to the first Van Acker government.

== Bibliography ==
- Dumoulin, M., « préface » Davignon, E., Spaak, Bruxelles, Racine, 1999
- Duvieusart, J., La Question Royale. Crise et dénouement : juin, juillet, août 1950, 3e éd., Bruxelles, Crisp, 1975
- Stengers, J., Léopold III et le gouvernement : Les deux politiques belges de 1940, 2e éd., Bruxelles, Racine, 2002
- van Den Dungen, P., Hubert Pierlot. La Loi, le Roi, la Liberté, Bruxelles, Le Cri, 2010
- Vanwleknhuyzen, J., Quand les chemins se séparent. Aux sources de la Question royale, 2e éd., Bruxelles, Racine, 2001
