= Philippe Servaty =

Belgian journalist

Philippe Servaty is a Belgian journalist who formerly worked for Brussels-based newspaper Le Soir.

Servaty traveled to Morocco, especially to the city of Agadir, several times between 2001 and 2005, where he engaged in sexual activities with poor young girls, photographing some of them naked and/or engaged in sexual acts. At least one of the women filed a complaint to the police in Morocco, after a CD-ROM of the pictures began circulating in marketplaces in Agadir. The police arrested her, as well as many of the other women pictured, as posing for pornographic photos is a crime in Morocco. Moroccan authorities asked Belgium to press charges against Servaty. Belgium declined, as the photos are not illegal under Belgian law. Moroccan authorities have stated that he will be arrested if he returns to Morocco; he had previously been arrested there for possession of pornography. Due to the scandal, Servaty resigned from Le Soir.

Families of the photographed women have placed a bounty on his head, and both he and his wife received death threats. Servaty was forced into hiding in fear for his life. Servaty said in an interview that he was a sex addict and apologized for his actions.

In February 2013, the Criminal Court of Brussels sentenced Servaty to 18 months for "debauchery or prostitution of a minor", "degrading treatment" and "exhibition and distribution of pornographic images".
