= Österreichische Freiheitsfront =

Anti-fascist organization

The Österreichische Freiheitsfront (English: Austrian Freedom Front) was an anti-fascist organization created by Austrian and German communist refugees in Brussels and Paris during the Second World War occupation of Belgium and France by Nazi Germany. It took an active part in the Belgian and French Resistance.

== History ==
Allied to the Front de l'Indépendance, a resistance network with a strong communist component, the main mission of the Österreichische Freiheitsfront was publishing and spreading leaflets in German. Among these was the periodical Die Wahrheit (The Truth), which contained messages from the British and Free Polish radios, inciting the German soldiers to desert.

A member of the organization, Régine Krochmal, explained that the approaching technique was to ask a soldier for a time in German, then begin to chat with him. If he was found open to criticism of the Nazi régime, an appointment was fixed in order to give him leaflets to spread. Such an act could lead to the death penalty for those caught.

According to another survivor, Jakob Zanger, the weekly circulation of Die Wahrheit, Österreichische Freiheitsfront, and from 1943 Freies Österreich surpassed 12,000, of which 9,000 were distributed outside Brussels. Copies were left in airports, movie theaters and other places frequented by German soldiers, to ensure a maximal circulation. The newspaper of the Austrian Communist Party, Rote Fahne (Red Flag), was clandestinely printed in Belgium on cigarette paper and transported to Austria.

Among the members of the Österreichische Freiheitsfront was Jean Améry (pseudonym of Hans Mayer, 1912–1978), an Austrian Catholic writer of Jewish origin. He was arrested in 1943 and deported to Auschwitz-Monowitz.

Toward the end of 1943 or beginning of 1944, a company of Austrian partisans was created, under the aegis of which Erich Ungar, a teacher and physical chemist, made bombs and explosives. Arms and munitions were obtained by attacking German soldiers, since, according to Zanger, the British only armed "white" partisans, who in practice hardly fought at all, and not "red" (communist) partisans.

In 1944, the Österreichische Freiheitsfront counted 750 members, and the president of the executive committee was Karl Przibram (b. 21 December 1878, Vienna, d. 10 August 1973, Vienna), who had arrived in Belgium with his wife at the beginning of 1939 with the intention of emigrating to England but was prevented by the German invasion of 1940. After the liberation, Przibram's prestige was so great that he performed the duties of chargé d'affaires for Austrian citizens in anticipation of reestablishment of consular and diplomatic authorities.

Irma Schwager, an Austrian antifascist militant from France, writes that she returned to Belgium after the liberation of Paris to help the Austrian antifascist raise the Österreichische Freiheitsfront, whose leadership derived from diverse affiliations: social democrats, communists, monarchists and apoliticals.

After the liberation of Belgium, some of the Austrian resistance fighters joined their comrades who had fought in France and who had fled to Switzerland to form a battalion of Austrian partisans in Yugoslavia under the leadership of Max Bair. Four other battalions of partisans were subsequently formed, recruited from among prisoners of war and the Strafdivision 999 under the leadership of Fürnberg and Honner.

== See also ==
- Francs-tireurs et partisans – main-d'œuvre immigrée (FTP-MOI)
- Todor Angelov
