= Le Soir =

French-language Belgian daily newspaper

- Type: Daily newspaper
- Format: Berliner
- Owner: Rossel & Cie. S.A
- Publisher: Rossel
- Editor: Béatrice Delvaux
- Founded: 1887; 139 years ago
- Political alignment: Progressive, social democratic
- Language: French
- Headquarters: Rue Royale / Koningsstraat 100, 1000 City of Brussels, Brussels-Capital Region, Belgium
- ISSN: 1375-5668
- Website: www.lesoir.be

Le Soir (French pronunciation: [lə swaʁ], lit. 'The Evening') is a French-language Belgian daily newspaper. Founded in 1887 by Émile Rossel, it was intended as a politically independent source of news. Together with La Libre Belgique, it is one of the most popular Francophone newspapers in both Brussels and Wallonia, and since 2005 has been published in Berliner format. It is owned by Rossel & Cie, which also owns several Belgian news outlets, as well as the French paper La Voix du Nord.

== History and profile ==
Le Soir was founded as a free advertising newspaper in 1887. Later it became a paying paper.

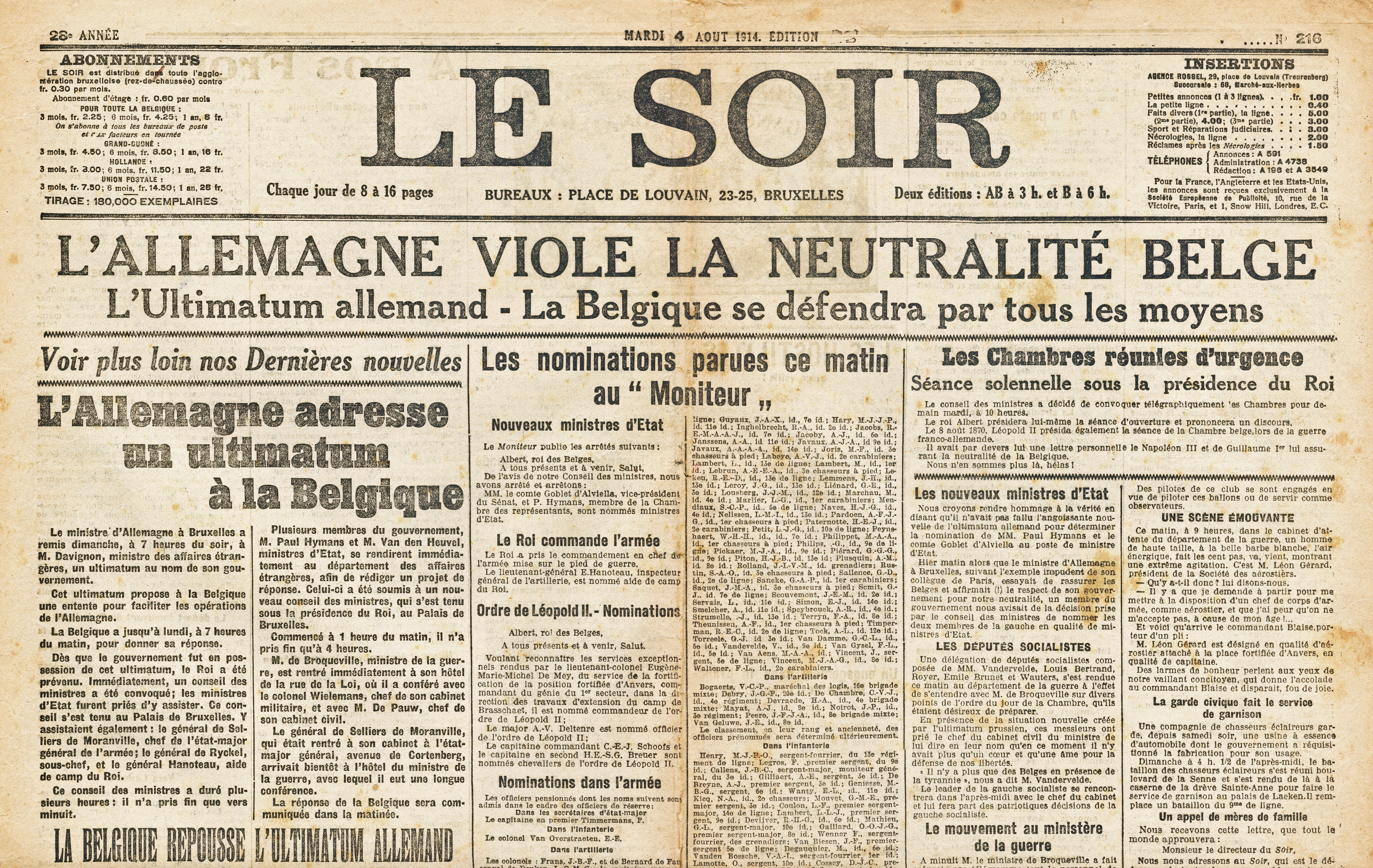
"Germany Violates Belgian Neutrality": Headline in Le Soir, 4 August 1914

When Belgium was occupied during the Second World War, Le Soir continued to be published under German censorship, unlike many Belgian newspapers which went underground. The paper, which became known as "Le Soir Volé" (or "Stolen Le Soir"), was parodied by the resistance group, the Front de l'Indépendance which in 1943 published a satirical pro-Allied edition of the paper, dubbed the "Faux Soir" (or "Fake Soir"), which was mixed with official copies of the paper and distributed to news kiosks in Brussels. The "Stolen Le Soir" was notable for including Hergé's The Adventures of Tintin cartoons in serialized form during the war.

The renewed production of the "Free Le Soir", under Lucien Fuss, restarted on 6 September 1944, just days after the Allied Liberation of Brussels. The publisher of the paper is Rossel company.

== Circulation ==
In the period of 1995–96 Le Soir had a circulation of 182,798 copies. Its 2002 circulation was 130,495 copies with a market share of 20.3%. The circulation of the paper was 104,000 copies in 2003 and 101,000 copies in 2004.

== Editorial stance ==
Compared to its centrist to centre-right competitor, La Libre Belgique, Le Soir is seen as social democratic and progressive with politically federalist leanings.

Reaffirmed on the occasion of the release of the new format on 15 November 2005, Le Soir describes its editorial stance as "a progressive and independent daily newspaper." It describes its aims to be a "counterweight" and "always alert, in line with society".

It describes its role as:

An evening paper to fight for the rights of man and women, to respect human dignity, freedom of expression, tolerance, multiculturalism, difference

— Béatrice Delvaux, editor-in-chief, 2005.

== Google controversy ==
The newspaper gained some notoriety on the internet after it successfully sued the search engine Google for copyright infringement. The case was built on the fact that Google made parts of the newspaper's website available through its search engine and its Google News service, even after the articles in question had been removed from the newspaper's website. A Belgian judge ruled that this did not conform to Belgian regulations and ordered Google to remove all "copyright violations" from its websites. Google responded by removing all links to the newspaper not only from its news service but also from its search index.

== Charlie Hebdo bomb threat ==
In response to the terrorist attack on Charlie Hebdo in which 12 people died on 7 January 2015, some international organizations such as Reporters Without Borders and the Index on Censorship called for controversial Charlie Hebdo cartoons to be re-published in solidarity with the French satirical magazine and in defense of free speech. The Hamburger Morgenpost included Charlie Hebdo cartoons on its front cover on 8 January and was subsequently firebombed.

Le Soir faced bomb threats for republishing Charlie Hebdo cartoons, including many satirising religion.

== See also ==
- Philippe Servaty
- Faux Soir
