= Raoul Baligand =

Belgian politician (1913–1981)

Member of the Chamber of Representatives
- In office March 8, 1946 – June 26, 1949

Member of the Municipal Council of Gilly
- In office 1946–1952

Personal details
- Born: January 4, 1913 Roux, Belgium
- Died: December 28, 1981 (aged 68) Brussels, Belgium
- Party: Communist Party of Belgium
- Spouse: Berthe Verkerk
- Education: Université du Travail Paul Pastur
- Awards: Commander of the Order of the Crown; Order of the British Empire
- Military Service
- Allegiance: Belgium; Second Spanish Republic
- Branch: Belgian Army; Spanish Republican Army
- Service years: 1940 & 1934-1935; 1936-1938
- Units: XII International Brigade; André Marty Battalion
- Conflicts: World War Two; Battle of Belgium; Spanish Civil War; Aragon Offensive; Battle of Caspe
- Awards: Silver Star (1946)

Raoul Baligand (4 January 1913 – 28 December 1981) was a Belgian politician and member of the Belgian Resistance during the Second World War.

== Life ==
Baligand was born in Roux on January 4, 1913. His father was a miner.

At age thirteen, Baligand enrolled in education to become an electrician. Following the completion of his education, he obtained a job at Ateliers de Constructions Electriques de Charleroi. A series of labour strikes in 1932 influenced Baligand to become a communist. Between September 1934 and April 1935, he completed his compulsory military service, serving as a military engineer.

Following the outbreak of the Spanish Civil War, Baligand travelled to Spain and enlisted in the International Brigades in October 1936. He was assigned to the Franco-Belgian André Marty Battalion. In June 1937, he was wounded in action near Huesca. He was wounded a second time in Caspe. By the end of his service in Spain, he held the rank of captain. Baligand returned to Belgium from Spain on November 28, 1938.

Baligand was mobilized by the Belgian Army when Belgium was invaded by Nazi Germany in May 1940.

On August 4, 1940, Baligand married Berthe Verkerk, a communist activist from Antwerp. Both Baligand and Verkerk were active members of the underground press, writing for the publications Clarté and Partisan.

In June 1941 Baligand began to conduct armed resistance operations alongside several Belgian veterans of the Spanish Civil War. He coordinated many sabotage missions, including the theft of hundreds of kilograms of explosives from the Bois du Cazier mine.

By the end of the Second World War, Baligand was the commander of all Partisans Armés operations in western Wallonia.

From 1943 to 1951 he would serve on the Central Committee of the Communist Party of Belgium.

In February 1946, having left the army, he stood for election and was elected to the Chamber of Representatives for the district of Charleroi. He would remain in this role until 1949.

In October 1946, he was elected to the municipal council of Gilly, a post he would hold until 1952.

Baligand was also a highly active member of several veterans organizations. He once again served on the Central Committee of the Communist Party of Belgium from 1960 until his death. He died on December 28, 1981, in Brussels.

== Awards ==
- Commander of the Order of the Crown
- Silver Star (1946)
- Order of the British Empire (1946)
