= List of French Communist Party congresses =

List of congresses held by the French Communist Party.

| Date | Congress | Place |
| 25–30 December 1920 | Congrès de Tours | Tours |
| 25–30 December 1921 | 1st Congress | Marseille |
| 15–20 October 1922 | 2nd Congress | Paris |
| 20–24 January 1924 | 3rd Congress | Lyon |
| 17–21 January 1925 | 4th Congress | Clichy |
| 20–26 June 1926 | 5th Congress | Lille |
| 31 March - 7 April 1929 | 6th Congress | Saint-Denis |
| 11–19 March 1932 | 7th Congress | Paris |
| 22–25 January 1936 | 8th Congress | Villeurbanne |
| 25–29 December 1937 | 9th Congress | Arles |
| 26–30 June 1945 | 10th Congress | Paris |
| 25–28 June 1947 | 11th Congress | Strasbourg |
| 2–6 April 1950 | 12th Congress | Gennevilliers |
| 3–6 June 1954 | 13th Congress | Ivry-sur-Seine |
| 18–21 July 1956 | 14th Congress | Le Havre |
| 25–30 May 1959 | 15th Congress | Ivry-sur-Seine |
| 11–14 May 1961 | 16th Congress | Saint-Denis |
| 14–17 May 1964 | 17th Congress | Paris |
| 4–8 May 1967 | 18th Congress | Levallois-Perret |
| 4–8 February 1970 | 19th Congress | Nanterre |
| 13–17 December 1972 | 20th Congress | Saint-Ouen |
| 24–27 October 1974 | 21st Congress | Vitry-sur-Seine |
| 4–8 February 1976 | 22nd Congress | L'Île-Saint-Denis |
| 9–13 May 1979 | 23rd Congress | Saint-Ouen |
| 3–7 February 1982 | 24th Congress | Saint-Ouen |
| 6–10 February 1985 | 25th Congress | Saint-Ouen |
| 2–6 December 1987 | 26th Congress | Saint-Ouen |
| 18–22 December 1990 | 27th Congress | Saint-Ouen |
| 25–29 January 1994 | 28th Congress | Saint-Ouen |
| 25–22 December 1996 | 29th Congress | La Défense |
| 23–26 March 2000 | 30th Congress | Martigues |
| 26–28 October 2001 | 31st Congress | La Défense |
| 3–6 April 2003 | 32nd Congress | Saint-Denis |
| 23–26 March 2006 | 33rd Congress | Le Bourget |
| 11–14 December 2008 | 34th Congress | La Défense |
| 18–20 June 2010 | 35th Congress | La Défense |
| 7–10 February 2013 | 36th Congress | Aubervilliers |
| 2-5 June 2016 | 37th Congress | Aubervilliers |
| 23–26 March 2018 | 38th Congress | Ivry-sur-Seine |
| 7–8 April 2023 | 39th Congress | Marseille |
