= Jean Fonteyne =

Belgian lawyer, resistant, politician, and filmmaker

Jean Fonteyne (1899–1974) was a Belgian lawyer, resistant, politician and filmmaker born in May 1899 in Ledeberg (near Ghent in East Flanders) and died on 22 June 1974.

== Biography ==
In 1933, he shot the film Journée Tayenne - 9 juillet 1933 with the photographer Albert Van Ommeslaghe (1890–1976). Between 1933 and 1936, he produced Autour du Borinage based on the filming of the film Misère au Borinage by Joris Ivens and Henri Storck. His filmed documents are of exceptional social contribution and artistic richness in the early days of the 7th Art.

He was a member of the Resistance during both world wars.

A member of the Communist Party of Belgium, he was a senator between 1946 and 1949.

Married to Andrée De Lannay, they had four children.

Jean Fonteyne is also known for a conference at the Belgian-Bulgarian Friendships on June 26, 1951, entitled “The Country of Dimitrov”.

Lawyer Jean Fonteyne, a former intern at the firm of Maître Paul-Émile Janson, is known for having created the Belgian legal journal "Revue générale des assurances et des responsabilités" which is now a reference in the field.

His commitment as a lawyer made him an active privileged witness to progressive causes before and after the war. In particular, he participated in the defense of French communist deputies whose party was banned in the 1930s, of the widow of Julien Lahaut in the context of the assassination of the Seresian deputy in the 1950s, as well as of the renowned obstetrician Willy Peers imprisoned in the early 1970s for having performed voluntary terminations of pregnancy.

He wrote several works such as "Le procès des 44" (the case of the deputies of the banned PCF), "Buchenwald" (testimony of his experience in a Nazi concentration camp), "Le combat de Hertz Jospa" (collective monograph on a comrade in arms), etc. His parliamentary interventions published in small booklets are a moving testimony to the progressive struggles of the immediate post-war period in Belgium.

Secretary of the Vigilance Committee of Anti-Fascist Intellectuals in the 1930s, Jean Fonteyne played an important role in the preparatory and contemporary advances in organized Belgian and French anti-Nazi resistance.

A man of great culture and profound modesty, throughout his communist commitment, open and convinced, he never ceased to privilege above all women and men, human relations of resistance and friendship, culture, pluralism and progress, outside of any sectarian or orthodox desire. This humanist uprightness earned him to be excluded from the Communist Party of Belgium from which he was violently excluded in 1965 for having refused to ostracize former comrades of deportation.
