= Albert Marteaux =

Belgian physician and politician (1886–1949)

Minister of Health
- In office 31 March 1946 – 20 March 1947
- Preceded by: Jean Van Beneden
- Succeeded by: Alfons Verbist

Personal details
- Born: 26 January 1886 Marollen, Brussels, Belgium
- Died: 19 June 1949 (aged 63) Brussels, Belgium
- Party: Communist Party of Belgium
- Other political affiliations: Belgian Labor Party
- Education: Université libre de Bruxelles
- Profession: Physician

Albert Marteaux (26 January 1886 – 19 May 1949) was a Belgian physician, politician and a leader of the Belgian resistance during the Second World War.

== Biography ==
Marteaux was born in to a large working-class family. He studied medicine in the Free University of Brussels.

Initially he became politically active for the socialist Belgian Labour Party (BWP) and was elected councilor of Brussels for this party in 1921. In addition, he was a member of the Chamber of Representatives for the Brussels district from 1926 to 1929 and from 1936 until his death in 1949. In 1939 he switched to the communist Communist Party of Belgium (KPB) following the policy of the Belgian government (of which the BWP was a part at the time) towards the Spanish Civil War.

After the German occupation lf Belgian during World War II, Marteaux co-founded the Front de l'indépendance, which was active in the Resistance.

After the liberation, Marteaux became Minister of Health for a short time in 1944 in the short -lived Pierlot VI Government. He held this ministerial post from January 1945 to February 1946 and again from March 1946 to March 1947 in the governments of Van Acker I, II, III and Huysmans.

From 1947 to 1948, Marteaux was vice-president of the Chamber of Representatives.
