= Partisans Armés =

Belgian resistance movement during WW2

Armed Partisans Partisan armés
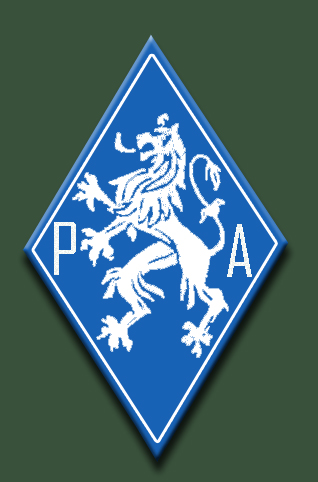
- Insignia of the PA
- Leader: Raoul Baligand
- Dates active: 1940 – September 1944
- Size: 13,246 members (total)
- Part of: Communist Party of Belgium
- Wars: the Second World War

The Armed Partisans (French: Partisans armés, or PA) was a faction of the resistance in German-occupied Belgium in World War II. The group was affiliated to the Belgian Communist Party. In 1941, many of its members left to join the Front de l'Independance while the rest of the group was undermined in 1943 when almost all the leadership of the group and the Communist Party were arrested by German forces. It was renamed the Belgian Army of Partisans (Armée belge des partisans) after the Liberation of Belgium in September 1944.

13,246 people are recognized as having been members of the PA at some point during the war. The group suffered heavy casualties and 1,200 were killed and a further 3,000 were arrested and sent to prison camps.

== Notable members ==
- Todor Angelov
- Arnaud Fraiteur
- Antonina Grégoire
- Jacques Grippa
- Fernande Volral
