= Front de l'Indépendance =

Belgian resistance organisation during World War II

Independent Front Front de l'Indépendance (French) Onafhankelijkheidsfront (Dutch)
- Insignia of the FI
- Leaders: Albert Marteaux; André Roland; Fernand Demany
- Dates active: March 1941 – September 1944
- Ideology: Broadly Socialist-Communist
- Wars: the Second World War

The Independent Front (French: Front de l'Indépendance, pronounced [fʁɔ̃ də lɛ̃depɑ̃dɑ̃s], FI; Dutch: Onafhankelijkheidsfront, pronounced [ˌɔn.ɑfˈɦɑŋkələkɦɛitsˌfrɔnt], OF) was a left-wing faction of the Belgian Resistance in German-occupied Belgium in World War II. It was founded in March 1941 by Dr Albert Marteaux of the Communist Party of Belgium, Father André Roland, and Fernand Demany, another communist. The aim of the organisation was to unite Belgian resistance groups of all opinions and political leanings; nonetheless the only political party that was affiliated as such was the Communist Party. The FI operated a significant propaganda, social and paramilitary organization, in addition to its military and sabotage functions and operated in competition with the larger pro-government Secret Army.

== History ==
=== Activities ===
The FI established sabotage operations, escape routes and a false document service, and distributed 250 different underground publications. This essential part of the war, in the area of information, found a culmination of sorts in the publication by the Front on 9 November 1943 of Faux Soir, a spoof version of the Le Soir newspaper circulated under the noses of the occupation authorities.

The FI was highly active in preventing large numbers of Belgian men being forced to leave the country to work as forced labour in Germany. These 40,000 of these so-called "Réfractaires" were hidden by the FI's "Organisation Socrates".

In February 1943, the FI sent the sociologist Victor Martin on a spying mission in Germany to search for reliable information about what happened to the Jews deported to Germany. He came back in May with the first reliable report on their fate, as well as with detailed information on the functioning of the Auschwitz concentration camp.

=== Affiliated groups ===
From the start, the Front de l'Indépendance was intended to act as a united front to which other resistance groups could affiliate. By the end of the war, it had formed alliances with representatives of a large number of institutions, including:

- Partisans Armés (PA, Armed Partisans),
- Milices Patriotiques (MP, Patriotic Militia),
- Solidarité (Solidarity, founded in 1942 as the social service of the F.I. to help victims of the Nazi repression and their families, those who refused to go in Germany under the Service du travail obligatoire, foreign illegals etc.; the Belgian section of the Secours Rouge continued within this clandestine organization),
- Comités de lutte syndicale (Committee for the Trade Union Fight)
- Wallonie Libre (Free Wallonia),
- Comité de Défense des Juifs (CDJ, Committee for Jewish Defence)
- LOMO (Dutch: Leraren Officieel Middelbaar Onderwijs, Middle school teachers of the public network in Flanders), whose leader Aloïs Gerlo (1915–1998) was an activist of the Communist Party between 1940 and 1956
- Front, the underground newspaper
- Österreichische Freiheitsfront (Austrian Freedom Front), an antifascist organisation created in Brussels by communist emigrės from Austria and Germany.
