= Milices Patriotiques =

Communist Belgian resistance group in the Second World War

Patriotic Militia Milices Patriotiques (MP-PM)
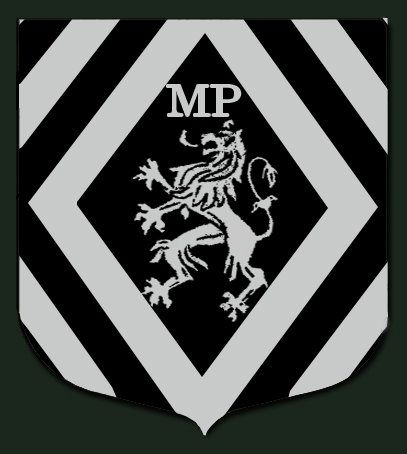
- Ideology: Communist
- Size: 22,006 members (total)
- Part of: Belgian Communist Party
- Wars: the Belgian Resistance (World War II)

The Patriotic Militia (French: Milices patriotiques, Dutch: Patriotische Militie) was a communist group in the Belgian resistance during the Second World War, affiliated to the Communist Party of Belgium. The Milices were intended to be a mass movement, working alongside the much smaller Partisans Armés (PA) group.

== History ==
22,006 people are recognized to have been part of the Milices during the war.
