= Stolperstein =

Brass plate memorial for victims of Nazism

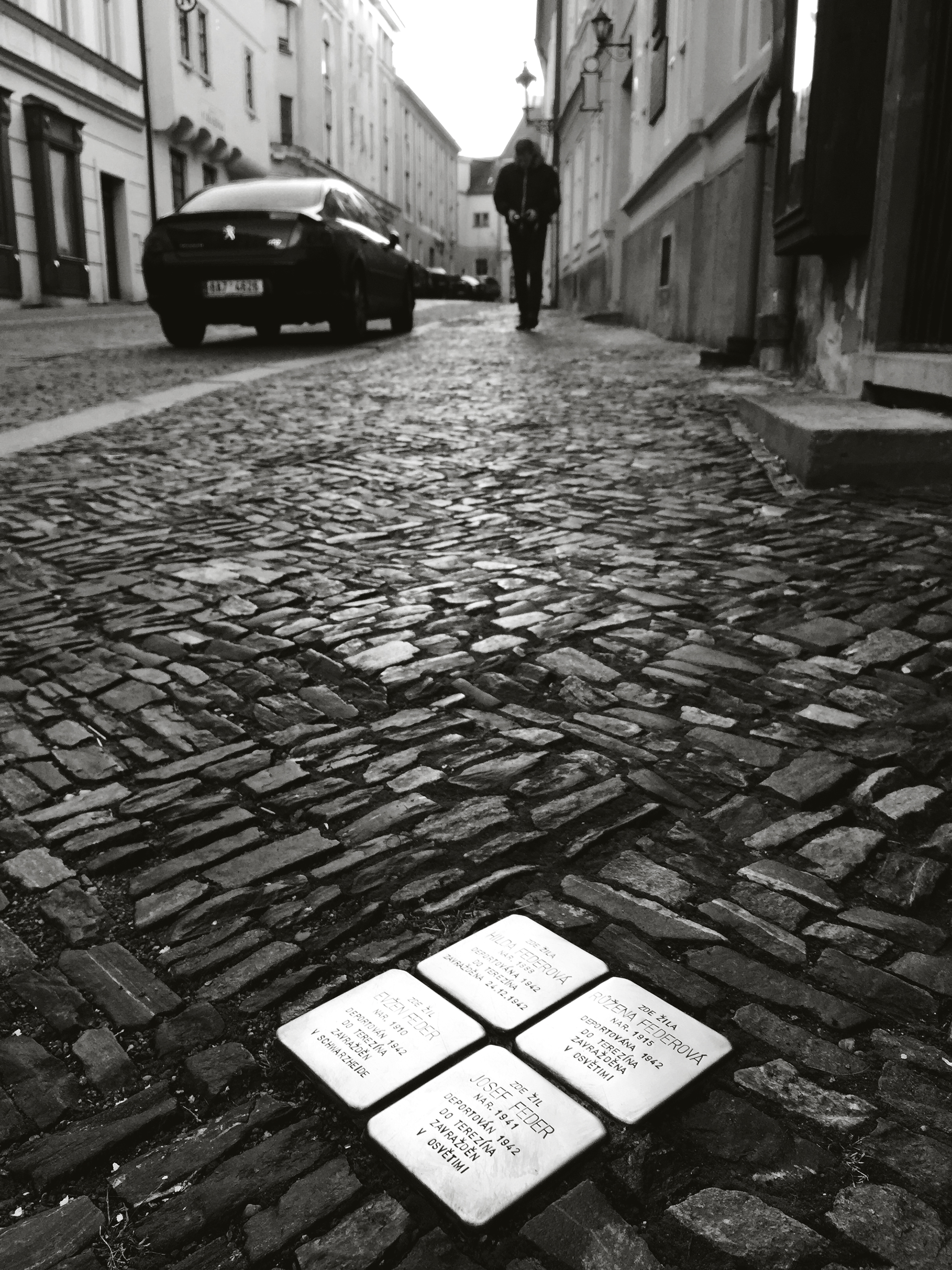
Stolpersteine for the Feder family in Kolín, Czech Republic

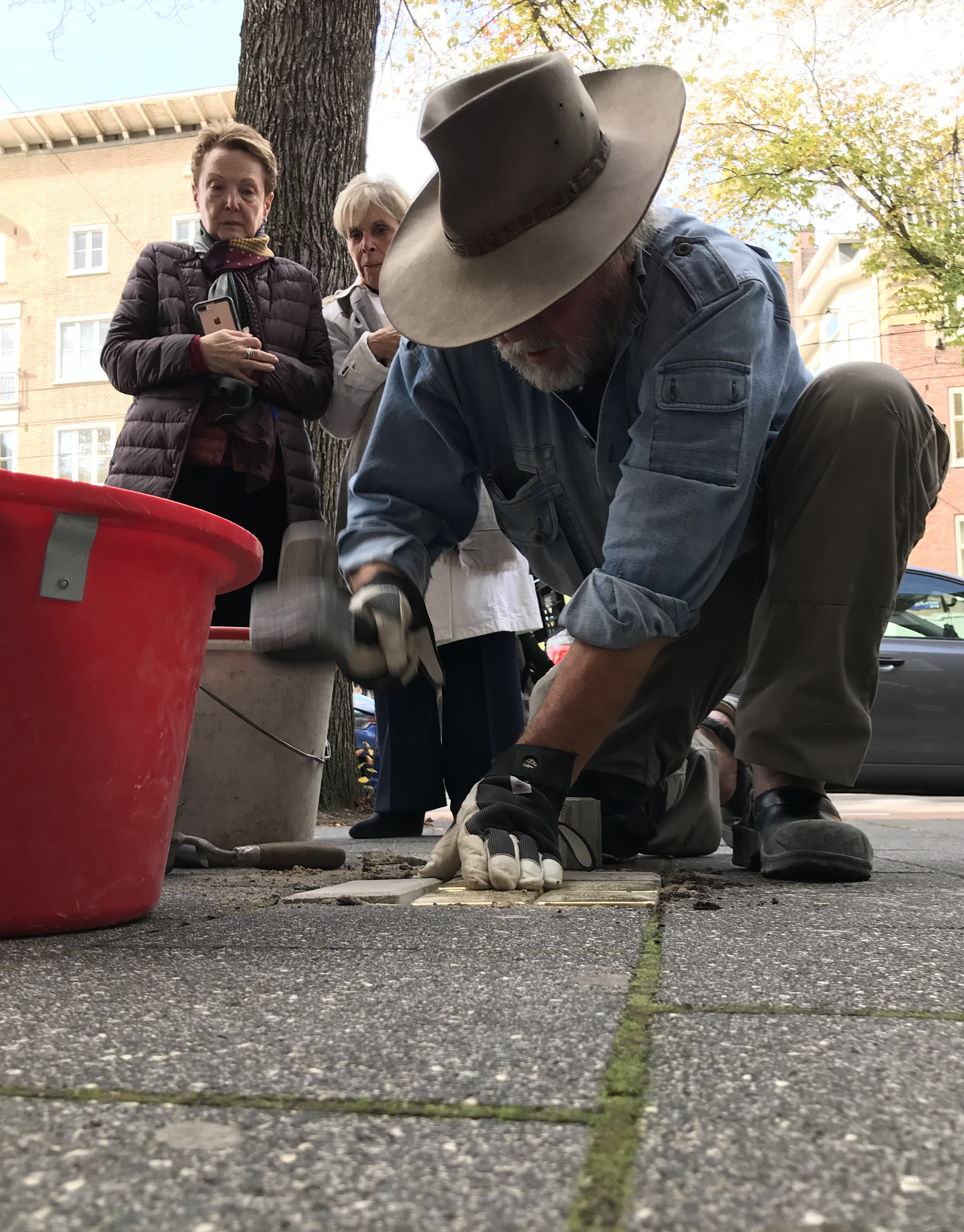
Stolperstein installation in Amsterdam Beethovenstraat 55 on 3 October 2018

A Stolperstein (pronounced [ˈʃtɔlpɐˌʃtaɪn]; plural Stolpersteine; in English 'stumbling block') is a ten-centimetre (four-inch) concrete cube bearing a brass plate inscribed with the name and life dates of victims of Nazi extermination or persecution. The Stolpersteine project, initiated by the German artist Gunter Demnig in 1992, aims to commemorate persons at the last place that they chose freely to reside, work or study (with exceptions possible on a case-by-case basis) before they fell victim to Nazi terror, forced euthanasia, eugenics, or deportation to a concentration or extermination camp, or escaped persecution by emigration or suicide. By June 2023, 100,000 Stolpersteine had been laid, making the Stolpersteine project the world's largest decentralized memorial.

The majority of Stolpersteine commemorate Jewish victims of the Holocaust. Others have been placed for Sinti and Romani people, Poles, homosexuals, the physically or mentally disabled, Jehovah's Witnesses, black people, members of the Communist Party, the Social Democratic Party, and the anti-Nazi Resistance, the Christian opposition (both Protestants and Catholics), and Freemasons, Spanish Republicans along with International Brigades soldiers in the Spanish Civil War, military deserters, conscientious objectors, escape helpers, capitulators, "habitual criminals", looters, and others charged with treason, military disobedience, or undermining the Nazi military, as well as Allied soldiers.

== Origin of the name ==
The name of the Stolpersteine project invokes multiple allusions. In Nazi Germany, an antisemitic saying, when accidentally stumbling over a protruding stone, was: "a Jew must be buried here". In a metaphorical sense, the German term Stolperstein can mean 'potential problem'. The term 'to stumble across something', in German and English, can also mean 'to find out (by chance)'. Thus, the term provocatively invokes an antisemitic remark of the past, but at the same time intends to provoke thoughts about a serious issue. Stolpersteine are not placed prominently, but are rather discovered by chance, only recognizable when passing by at close distance. In contrast to central memorial places, which according to Demnig can be easily avoided or bypassed, Stolpersteine represent a much deeper intrusion of memory into everyday life.

Stolpersteine are placed right into the pavement. When Jewish cemeteries were destroyed throughout Nazi Germany, the gravestones were often repurposed as sidewalk paving stones. The desecration of the memory of the dead was implicitly intended, as people had to walk on the gravestones and tread on the inscriptions. The Stolpersteine provocatively hint at this act of desecration, as they lack any kind of defense against new acts of shame. While the art project thus intends to keep alive the memory, implying that improper acts could easily happen again, the intentional lack of defense against potential desecration also created criticism and concern. Some German cities like Munich still do not accept the setting of Stolpersteine, and look for alternative ways of commemoration instead.

== Description ==
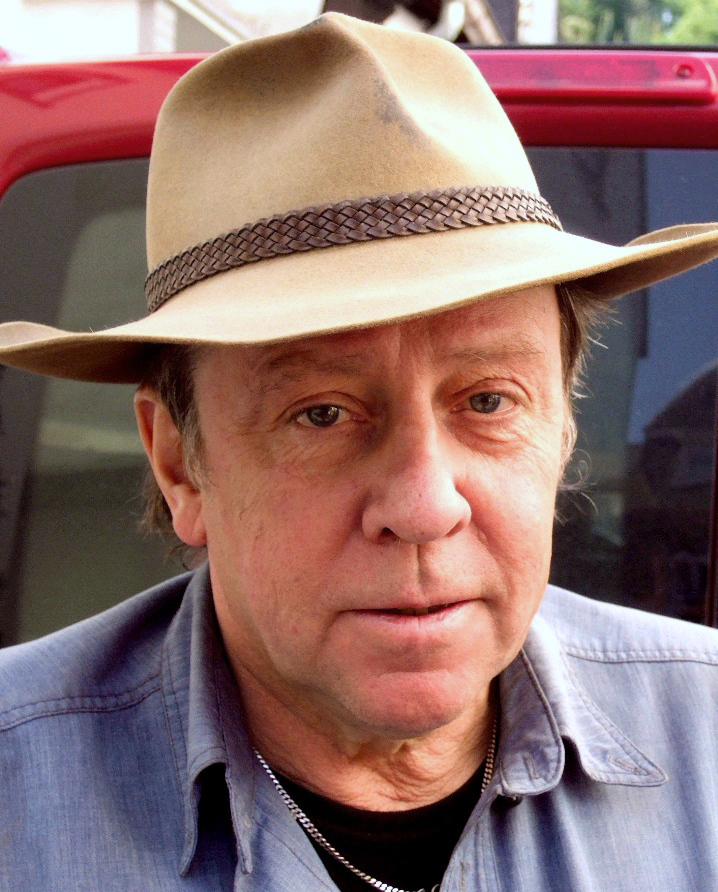
Gunter Demnig in 2007

Research about future Stolperstein locations is usually done by local school children and their teachers, victims' relatives, or local history organizations. The database of Yad Vashem in Jerusalem and the online database of the Mapping the Lives publication of the 1939 Germany Minority Census are used to search for names and residential addresses of Nazi victims.

When research on a particular person is completed, Demnig sets out to manufacture an individual Stolperstein. The person's name and dates of birth, deportation and death, if known, are engraved into the brass plate. The words Hier wohnte ('here lived') are written on most of the plates, emphasizing that the victims of persecution did not live and work at any anonymous place, but "right here". The Stolperstein is then inserted at flush level into the roadway or sidewalk, at the individual's last known place of freely chosen residence or work, with the intention to "trip up the passer-by" and draw attention to the memorial.

The costs of Stolpersteine are covered by individual donations, local public fund raising, contemporary witnesses, school classes, or community funds. From the beginning of the project until 2012, one Stolperstein cost €95, equivalent to €108 in 2021. In 2012, the price increased to €120, equivalent to €147 in 2021. Each individual Stolperstein is still manufactured by hand, so that only about 440 of them can be produced per month. Today, it may take up to several months from the application for a new Stolperstein until it is finally installed.

Starting in 2005, Michael Friedrichs-Friedländer has partnered with Gunter Demnig to install about 63,000 Stolpersteine in 20 different languages. Friedrichs-Friedländer explained to a reporter that he has not changed the engraving process and all engraving continues to be completed by hand; this is purposeful, to prevent the process from becoming anonymous.

=== First Stolperstein ===
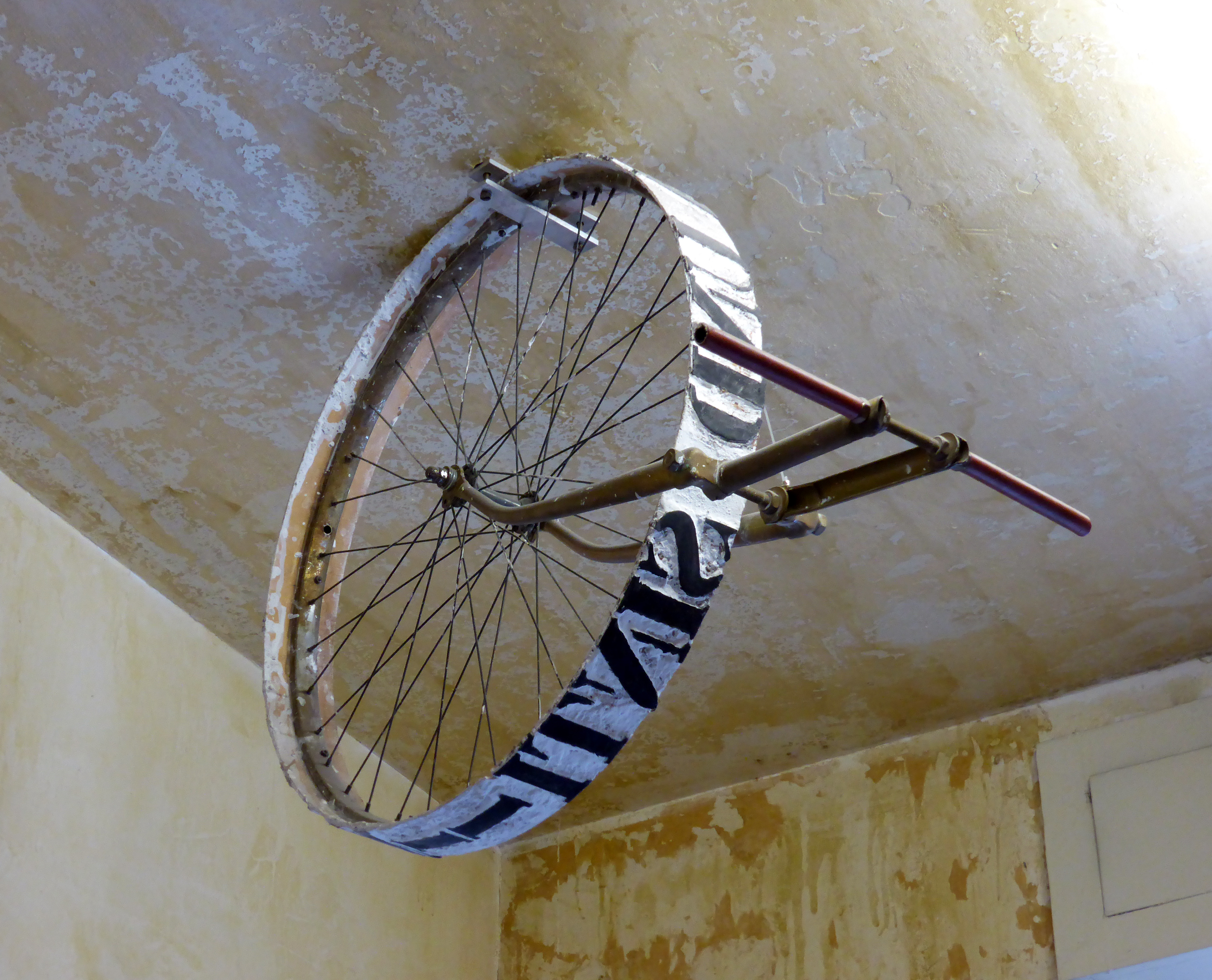
"Trace writing device", 1990: Rolling pavement-printing machine producing "Eine Spur durchs Vergessen" ('a trace against forgetting')

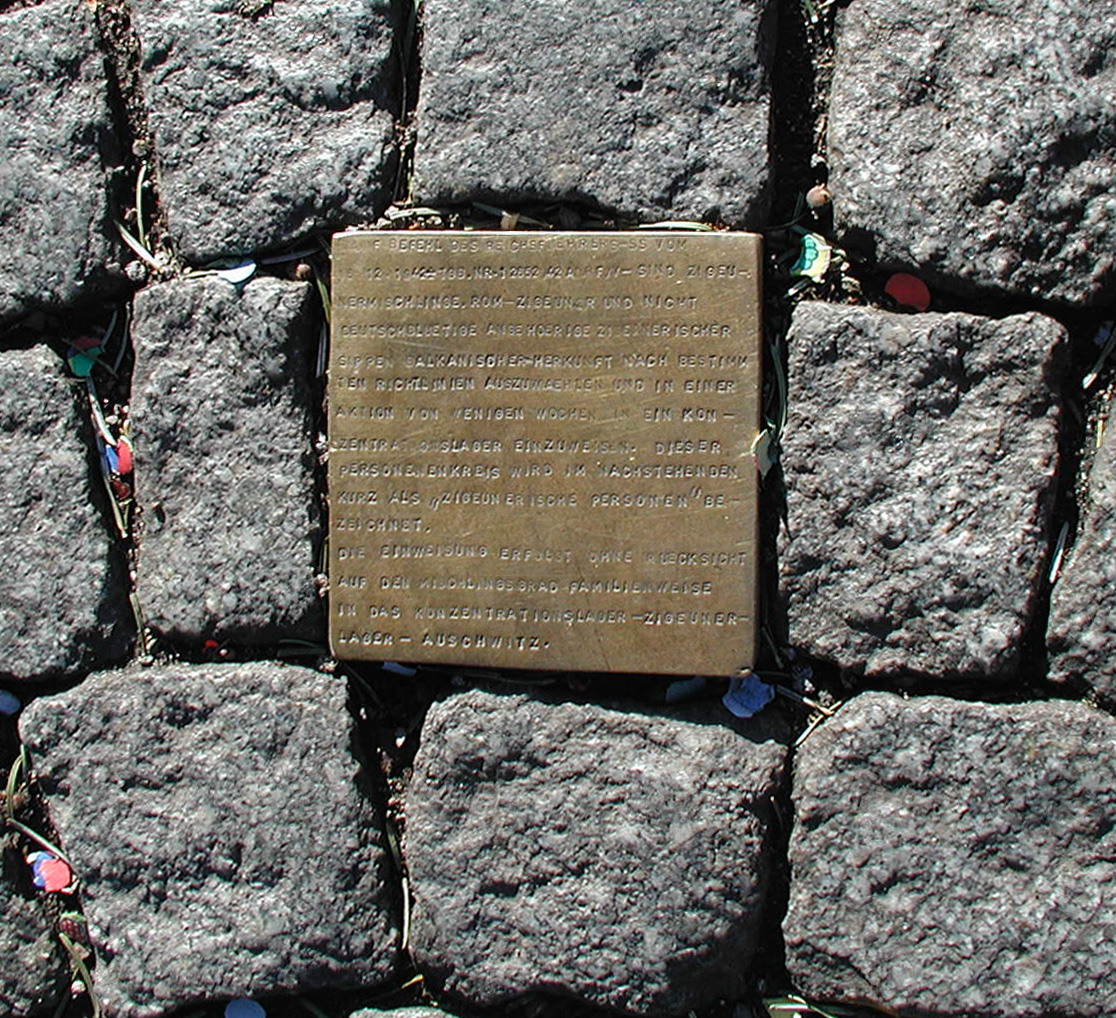
The very first Stolperstein, set on 16 December 1992 in front of Cologne City Hall, with Heinrich Himmler's order for the initiation of deportations

On 16 December 1992, 50 years had passed since Heinrich Himmler had signed the so-called Auschwitz-Erlass ('Auschwitz decree'), ordering the deportation of Sinti and Roma to extermination camps. This order marks the beginning of the mass deportation of Jews from Germany. To commemorate this date, Gunter Demnig traced the "road to deportation" by pulling a self-built, rolling pavement-printing machine through the inner city to the train station, where the deportees had boarded the trains to the extermination camps. Afterward, he installed the first Stolperstein in front of Cologne's historic City Hall. On its brass plate were engraved the first lines of the Auschwitz decree. (Note: The text reproduces the original wording: "Auf Befehl des Reichsführers SS vom 16.12.42 – Tgb. Nr. I 2652/42 Ad./RF/V. – sind Zigeunermischlinge, Rom-Zigeuner und nicht deutschblütige Angehörige zigeunerischer Sippen balkanischer Herkunft nach bestimmten Richtlinien auszuwählen und in einer Aktion von wenigen Wochen in ein Konzentrationslager einzuweisen. Dieser Personenkreis wird im nachstehenden kurz als 'zigeunerische Personen' bezeichnet. Die Einweisung erfolgt ohne Rücksicht auf den Mischlingsgrad familienweise in das Konzentrationslager (Zigeunerlager) Auschwitz." (transl. By decree of the Reichsführer SS as of 16.12.42 – Tgb. Nr. I 2652/42 Ad./RF/V. – Gypsy mixed-breeds, Roma Gypsies, and non-German-blooded members of Gypsy clans of Balkan origin are to be selected according to specific guidelines and, in an operation lasting a few weeks, interned in a concentration camp. This group of individuals is referred to hereafter, for the sake of brevity, as "Gypsy persons." They are to be interned—by family unit, regardless of their degree of mixed ancestry—in the Auschwitz concentration camp (Gypsy camp).)) Demnig also intended to contribute to the debate, ongoing at that time, about granting the right of residence in Germany to Roma people who had fled from former Yugoslavia.

Gradually, the idea arose of expanding the commemoration project to include all victims of Nazi persecution, as well as always doing so at the last places of residence which they were free to choose. A Stolperstein would symbolically bring back the victims to their neighbourhoods, to the places where they rightfully belonged, even many years after they had been deported. Gunter Demnig published further details of his project in 1993, and outlined his artistic concept in a contribution to the project Größenwahn – Kunstprojekte für Europa ('Megalomania: Art Projects for Europe'). In 1994, he exhibited 250 Stolpersteine for murdered Sinti and Roma at St Anthony's Church in Cologne, encouraged by Kurt Pick, the parish priest. This church, located prominently in Cologne city centre, was already serving as an important commemorative institution, and has been part of the Cross of Nails community since 2016. In January 1995, these Stolpersteine were brought to different locations in the city of Cologne, and laid into the pavements.

Another 55 Stolpersteine were set up in the Kreuzberg neighbourhood of Berlin in 1996, during the "Artists Research Auschwitz" project. In 1997, the first two Stolpersteine were laid in St. Georgen, Austria, commemorating Jehovah's Witnesses Matthias and Johann Nobis. This had been suggested by Andreas Maislinger, founder of Arts Initiative KNIE and the Austrian Holocaust Memorial Service. Friedrich Amerhauser was the first mayor who granted permission to install Stolpersteine within his city. Four years later, Demnig received permission to install 600 more Stolpersteine in Cologne.

=== Growth ===
Countries where Stolpersteine have been installed

By October 2007, Gunter Demnig had laid more than 13,000 Stolpersteine in more than 280 cities. He expanded his project beyond the borders of Germany to Austria, Italy, the Netherlands and Hungary. Some Stolpersteine were scheduled to be laid in Poland on 1 September 2006, but permission was withdrawn, and the project was cancelled.

On 24 July 2009, the 20,000th Stolperstein was unveiled in the Rotherbaum district of Hamburg, Germany. Gunter Demnig, representatives of the Hamburg government and its Jewish community, and descendants of the victims attended. By May 2010, more than 22,000 Stolpersteine had been set in 530 European cities and towns, in eight countries which had formerly been under Nazi control or occupied by Nazi Germany.

By July 2010 the number of Stolpersteine had risen to more than 25,000, in 569 cities and smaller towns. By June 2011 Demnig had installed 30,000 Stolpersteine.

In 2013 Gunter Demnig stated on his website:

There are already over 32,000 Stolpersteine in over 700 locations. Many cities and villages across Europe, not only in Germany, have expressed an interest in the project. Stones have already been laid in many places in Austria, Hungary, the Netherlands, Belgium, in the Czech Republic, in Poland (seven in Wrocław, one in Słubice), in Ukraine (Pereiaslav), in Italy (Rome) and Norway (Oslo).

During a talk at TEDxKoeln on 14 May 2013, Gunter Demnig announced the installation of the 40,000th Stolperstein, which had taken place in Drieborg, Oldambt, Netherlands, on 3 July 2013. It was one of the first 10 Stolpersteine in memory of Dutch communists who were executed by the German occupation forces after their betrayal by countrymen for hiding Jews and Roma.

On 11 January 2015, the 50,000th Stolperstein was installed in Torino, Italy, for Eleonora Levi.

On 23 October 2018, the 70,000th Stolperstein was installed in Frankfurt, Germany, for Willy Zimmerer, a victim of Nazi euthanasia who was murdered at Hadamar on 18 December 1944, when he was 43 years old.

On 29 December 2019, the 75,000th Stolperstein was installed in Memmingen for Martha and Benno Rosenbaum.

On 26 May 2023, the 100,000th Stolperstein was installed in Nuremberg for Johann Wild, a firefighter.

== Locations ==
Video of the replacement of the first Stolperstein placed in front of Cologne City Hall in 1992, which had been stolen in 2010 (March 2013)

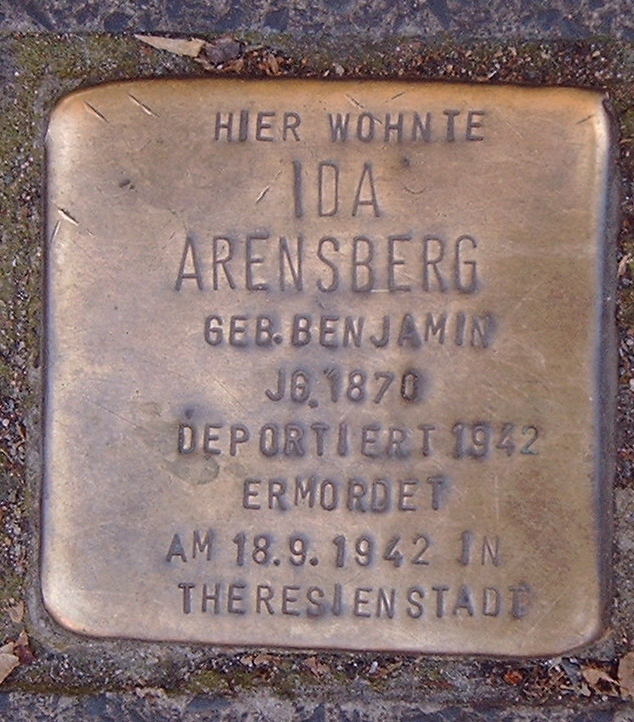
Stolperstein in Bonn with inscription transl. "Here lived Ida Arensberg née Benjamin, born 1870, deported 1942, murdered in Theresienstadt on 18 September 1942"

Stolpersteine are always installed at the last place that the person chose freely to reside, work or study, with exceptions possible on a case-by-case basis. The most important source for potential locations is the so-called Judenkartei ('Jews register'), which was set up at the 1939 census of Germany as of 17 May 1939. In cases where the actual houses were destroyed during World War II or during later restructuring of the cities, some Stolpersteine have been installed at the former site of the house.

By the end of 2016, Gunter Demnig and his co-workers had installed about 60,000 stones in more than 1,200 towns and cities throughout Europe:

- Germany (since 1992)
- Austria (since 1997)
- The Netherlands and Hungary (since 2007)
- Poland and Czech Republic (since 2008)
- Belgium and Ukraine (since 2009)
- Italy (since 2010)
- Norway (since 2011)
- Slovakia and Slovenia (since 2012)
- France, Croatia, Luxemburg, Russia and Switzerland (since 2013)
- Romania (since 2014)
- Greece and Spain (since 2015)
- Belarus (since 2014)
- Lithuania (since 2016)
- Finland (since 2018)
- Moldova (since 2018)
- Denmark and Sweden (since 2019)
- Serbia (since 2021)
- Bosnia and Herzegovina (since 2024)
- Jersey and Guernsey in the Channel Islands (since 2024)

=== Netherlands ===
Since 2007, Demnig has frequently been invited to place Stolpersteine in the Netherlands. The first city to do so was Borne. As of 2016, 82 Stolpersteine have been installed there. By January 2016, in total, more than 2,750 Stolpersteine have been laid in 110 Dutch cities and townships, including Amsterdam, The Hague and Rotterdam, but particularly in smaller cities like Hilversum (92 Stolpersteine), Gouda (183), Eindhoven (244), Oss and Oudewater (263 each). In March 2016 Demnig was in the Netherlands again, placing stones in Hilversum, Monnickendam, and Gouda, and Amsterdam. In the latter city he placed 74 stones; 250 had already been placed, and there were requests for 150 more.

=== Czech Republic ===
In the Czech Republic, the work on Stolpersteine started on 8 October 2008 in Prague and was initiated by the Czech Union of Jewish Students. Today, Stolpersteine are found across almost the entire country. As of January 2016 the exact number of Stolpersteine has not yet been established, but the main work was done in the larger cities, including Prague, Brno, Olomouc and Ostrava. There are also Stolpersteine in the small cities of Tišnov (15) and Lomnice u Tišnova (nine). One of them commemorates Hana Brady, who was murdered at the age of 13. Since 2010, a Stolperstein in Třeboň also commemorates her father.

=== Italy ===
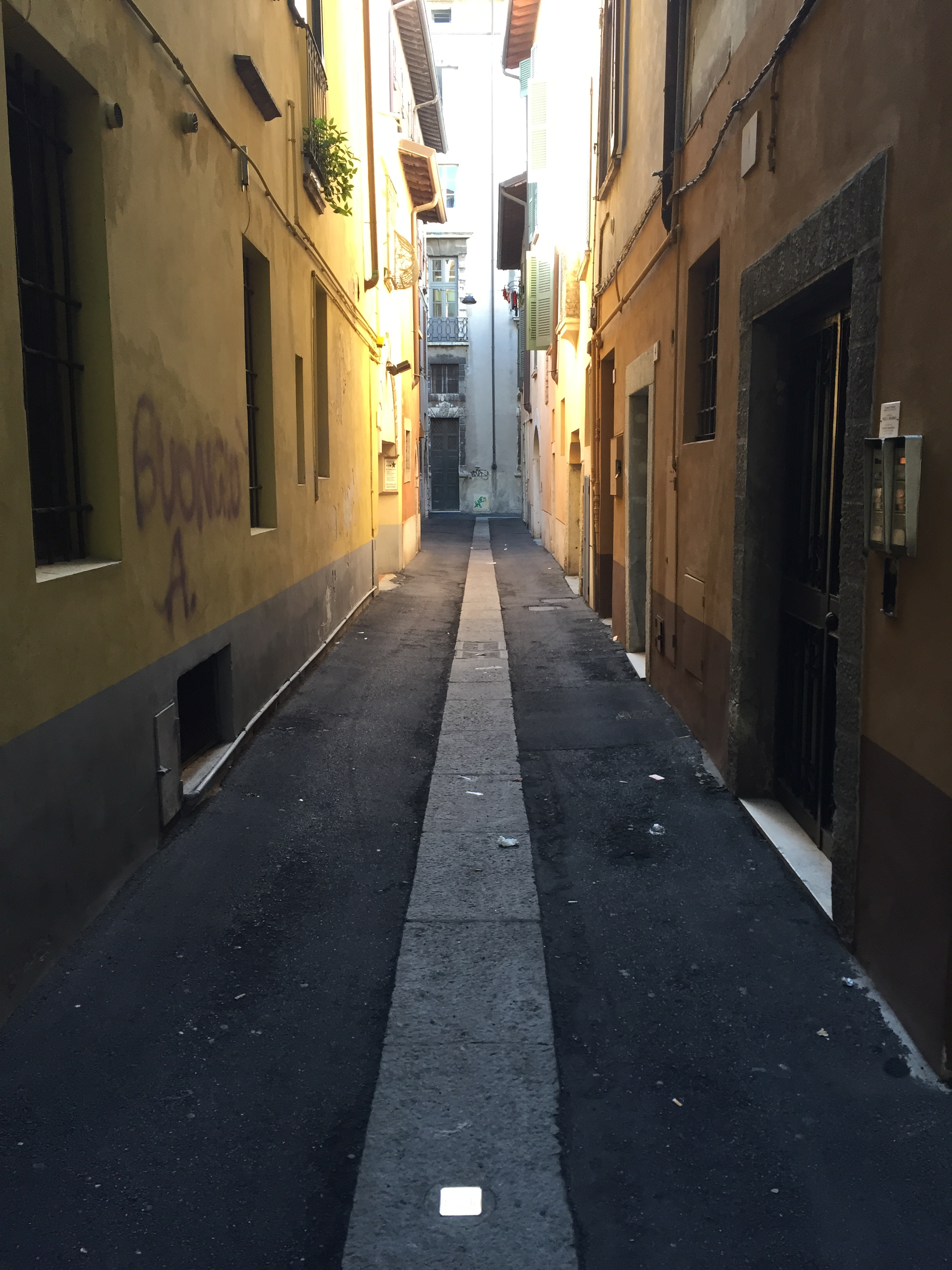
Stolperstein in Brescia for Ubaldo Migliorati, murdered in Buchenwald concentration camp

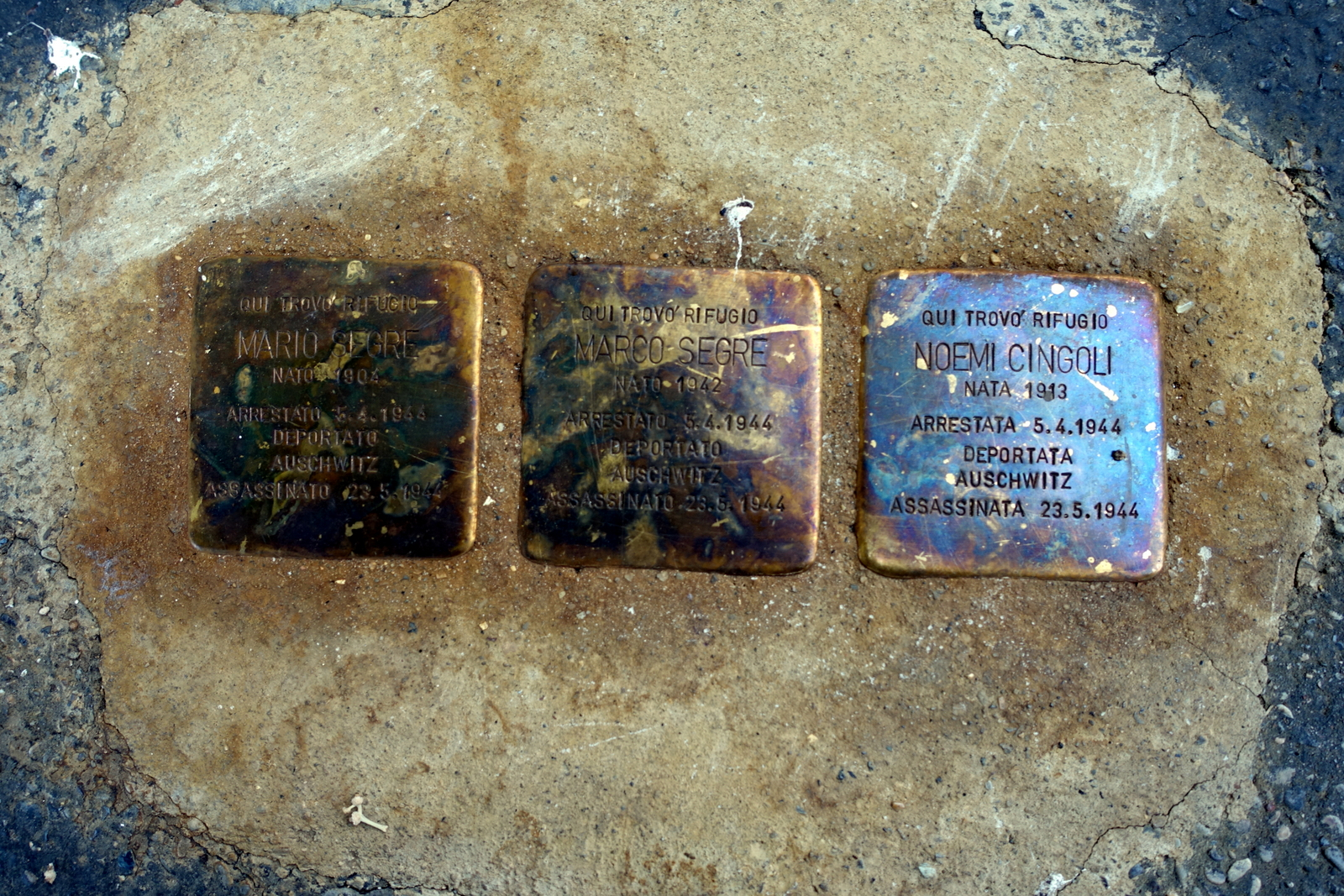
Pietre d'inciampo remembering Mario Segre, Noemi Cingoli and their infant son, outside the Swedish Institute in Rome. They were harbored there from 1943 until they were captured outside the institute on 5 April 1944. The blocks read Qui trovò rifugio, 'here found refuge'. They were murdered in Auschwitz on 23 April 1944.

Work in Italy began in Rome on 28 January 2010; there are now 207 Stolpersteine (in Italian called pietre d'inciampo) there. In 2012, work continued in the regions of Liguria, Trentino-Alto Adige/Südtirol and Lombardy. Veneto and Tuscany joined in 2014, Emilia-Romagna in 2015, Apulia, Abruzzo and Friuli-Venezia Giulia in 2016, Marche in 2017. In Italy, marked differences are observed, as compared to other countries: many Stolpersteine are dedicated not only to Jewish people and members of the political resistance, but also to soldiers of the Italian army who were disarmed, deported to Germany, and made to work as forced laborers there. They were given special status, so that they were not protected as prisoners of war under the Geneva Conventions after Italy left the coalition of the Axis powers after 8 September 1943.

=== France ===
In France where 75,000 Jews were deported to the concentration camps, initial efforts to install Stolpersteine were rejected. Notably, after a year-long campaign in 2011 led by a schoolgirl, Sarah Kate Francis, in the coastal town of La Baule-Escoublac (where 32 Jewish residents, including eight children, were deported), the councillor in charge of relations with patriotic organisations, Xavier de Zuchowicz, refused to allow a request for Stolpersteine to be installed, claiming that to do so might infringe the French constitutional principles of secularism (laïcité) and freedom of opinion (liberté d'opinion) and that they would therefore need to consult the Conseil d'État, France's constitutional court. In fact, Stolpersteine contain no reference to the religion of the victim who is commemorated, and 'freedom of opinion/expression' has never been invoked in either French or European jurisprudence to justify the refusal to commemorate individual victims of war crimes. The Mayor of La Baule has consistently refused to elaborate on his reasoning, and there is no record of the municipal council of La Baule having sought a declaration from the Conseil d'Etat in respect of these objections.

The first Stolpersteine were installed in France in 2015 in L'Aiguillon-sur-Mer in the Vendée.

=== Other countries ===
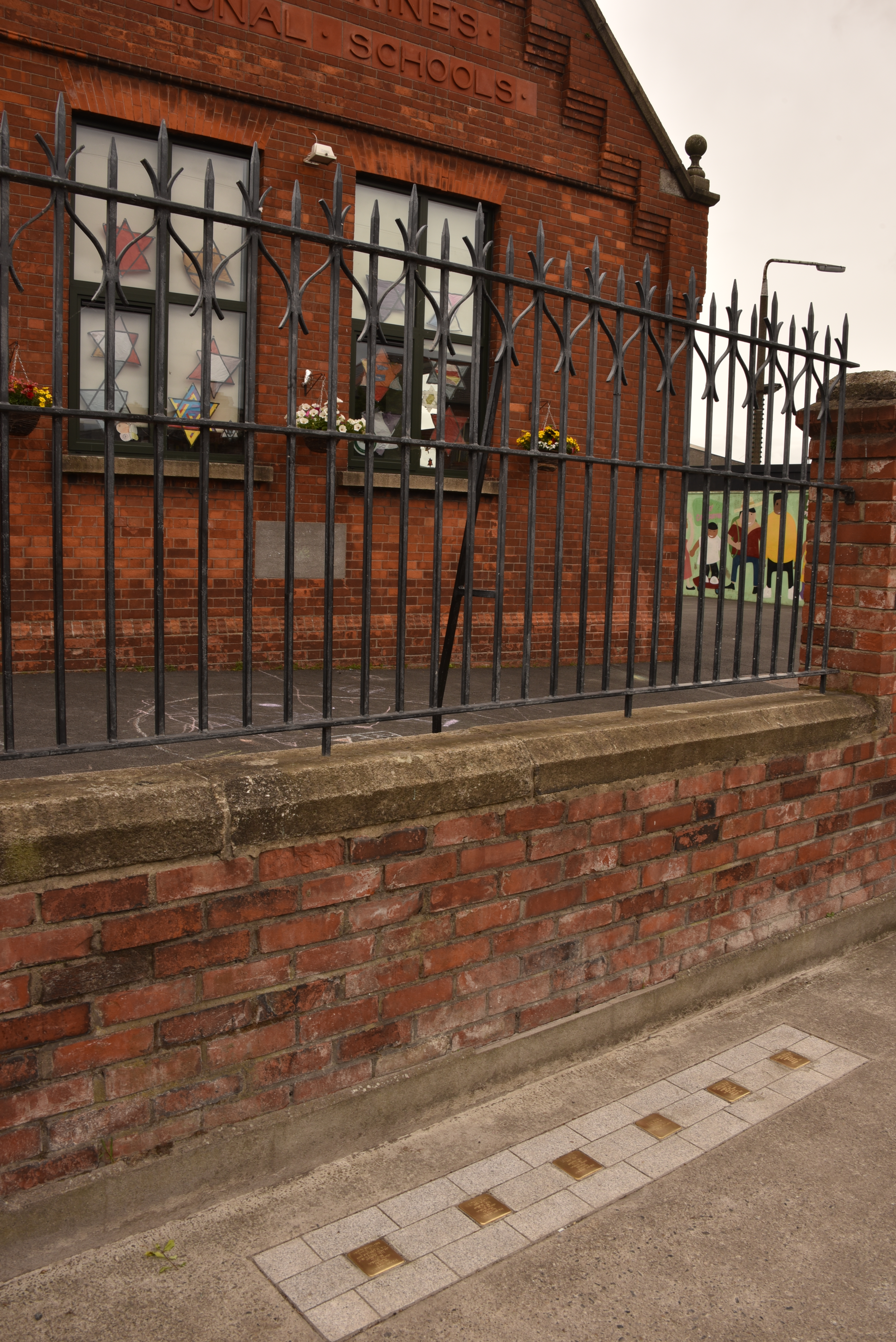
The six Stolpersteine in Dublin

Stolpersteine have also been installed in Spain, Sweden, Switzerland and the United Kingdom, though these countries were never occupied. In Spain, a large number of Republicans who fled to France after Francisco Franco's victory were caught by the Nazis after they had invaded France, and were either handed over to the Vichy regime, or deported to Mauthausen-Gusen concentration camp. About 7,000 Spanish people were held prisoner there, and were subjected to forced labour; more than half of them were murdered. The survivors were denationalized by the Franco regime, and became stateless persons, who were denied any form of recognition as victims, and deprived of any reparation. In Sweden, since 2019, the few Stolpersteine remember Jewish refugees who escaped there only to be captured by German spies and taken to the camps.

In Helsinki, Finland, there are seven Stolpersteine to honour Austrian Jewish refugees who had arrived in the country but who were given over to the Gestapo in November 1942. They were taken to Auschwitz and only one of the eight people survived.

In Dublin, Ireland, six Stolpersteine (unveiled in 2022) commemorate six Irish Jews who were murdered in the Holocaust: Ettie Steinberg, her Belgian-born husband Wojtech Gluck and their son Leon Gluck, who were all murdered at Auschwitz in 1942; Isaac Shishi, killed at Viekšniai, Lithuania in 1941; and siblings Ephraim and Jeanne (Lena) Saks, murdered at Auschwitz in 1944. Shishi and the Sakses were all born in Dublin but moved to continental Europe before war broke out.

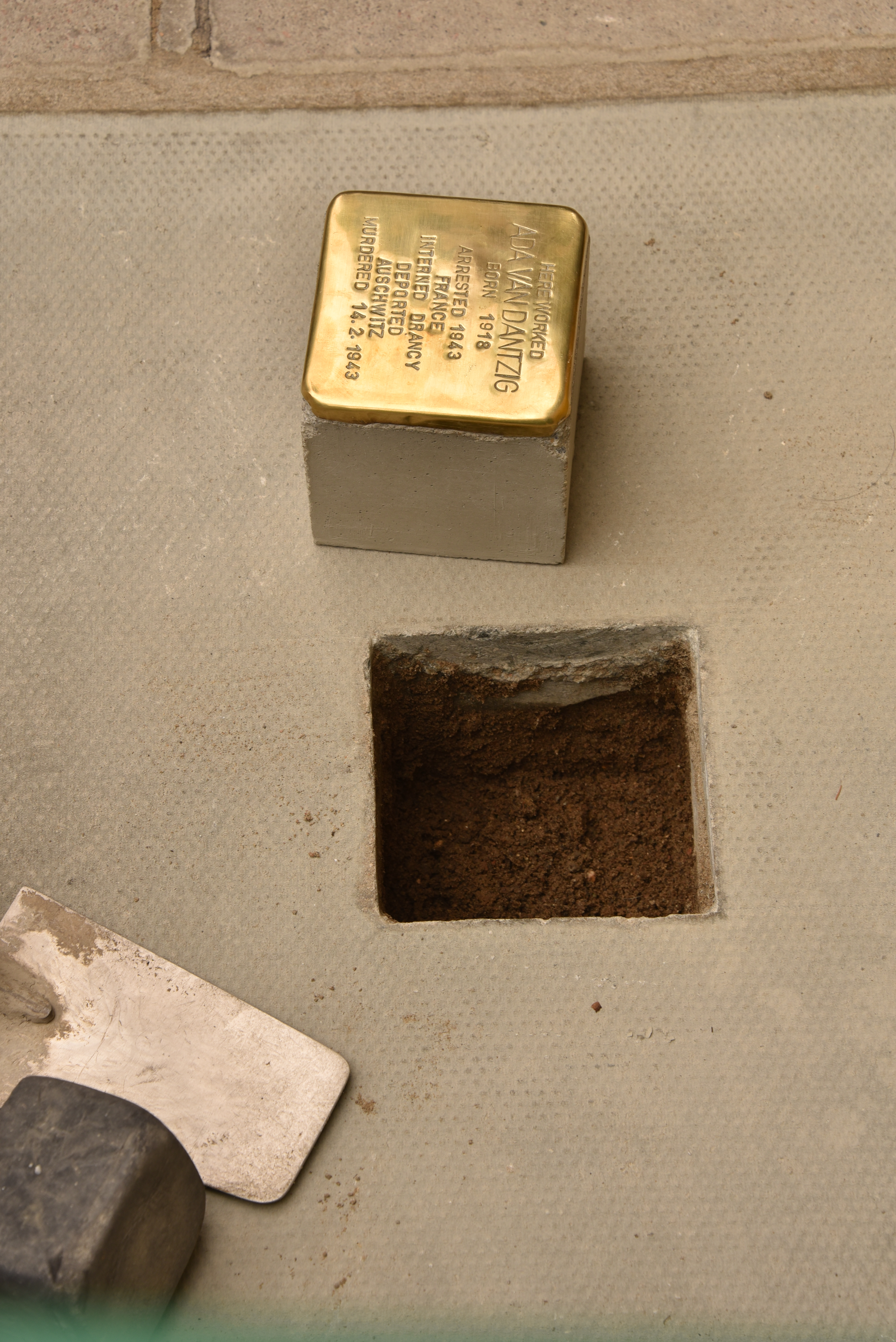
Stolperstein for Ada van Dantzig in Golden Square, Soho, London, prior to installation. Van Dantzig was arrested in France and murdered at Auschwitz on 14 February 1943.

In November 2022 the first Stolperstein in the UK was installed in Golden Square, Soho, London, commemorating Ada von Dantzig, who was murdered at Auschwitz in 1943 after she returned to the Netherlands, to rescue her family, who also became victims.

Even in countries where no Stolpersteine are installed, such as the US, the decentralized monument of the Stolpersteine has attracted media attention.

== Other forms ==
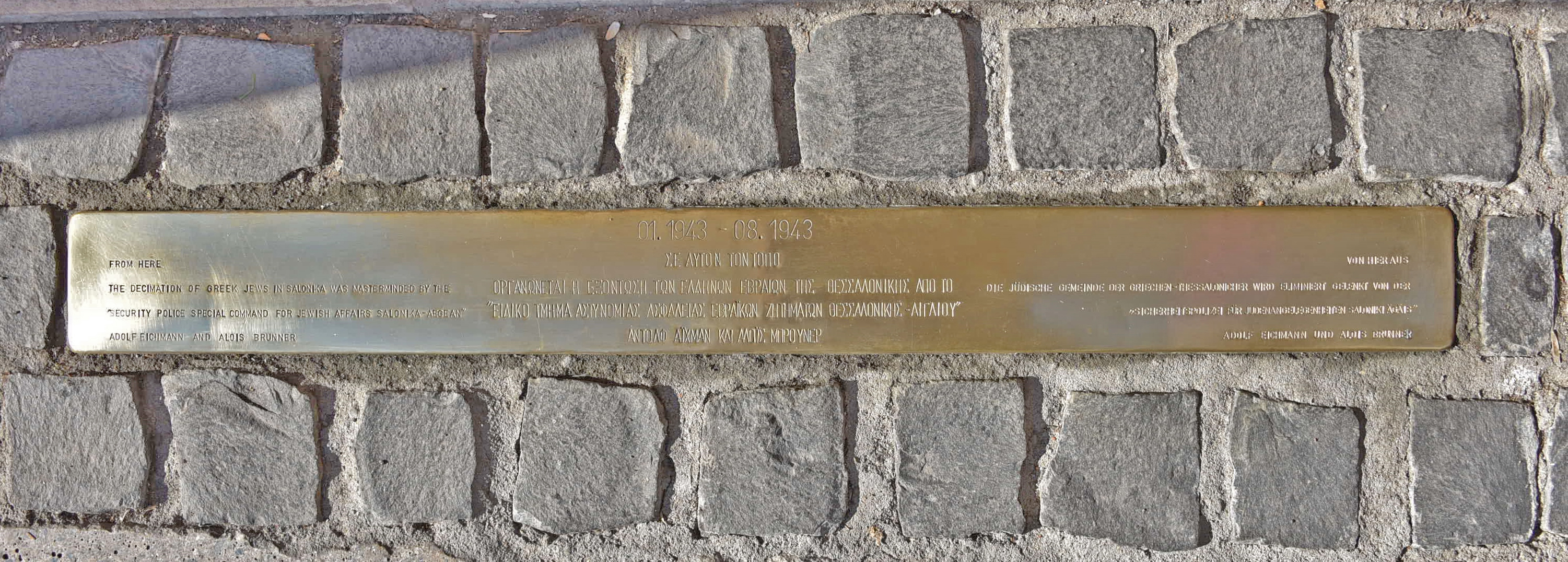
Stolperschwelle in Thessaloniki, with text in three languages

In special cases, Demnig also installs his so-called Stolperschwellen ('stumbling thresholds'), measuring 100 by 10 centimetres (39 by 4 in), which serve to commemorate entire groups of victims, where "hundreds or perhaps even thousands of Stolpersteine would need to be installed, but where space is insufficient or the sheer number would be overwhelming". Stolperschwellen are installed at Stralsund main station. From there, 1,160 mentally ill persons were deported in December 1939, victims of the forced euthanasia program Action T4, and murdered in Wielka Piaśnica.

Other Stolperschwellen commemorate female forced labourers from Geißlingen, who were imprisoned in the Natzweiler-Struthof concentration camp, the victims of the Holocaust in Luxemburg in Ettelbrück, forced laborers in Glinde and Völklingen, victims of forced euthanasia in Merseburg, and the first deportees, Roma and Sinti from Cologne. Further Stolperschwellen exist in Bad Buchau, Berlin-Friedenau, Nassau, Stralsund, and Weingarten. A Stolperschwelle was set up in Thessaloniki in front of the house in which Alois Brunner and Adolf Eichmann had planned the deportation and annihilation of 96.5% of the Jewish population of the town.

== Public discussion ==
=== Opposition ===
The city of Villingen-Schwenningen heatedly debated the idea of allowing Stolpersteine in 2004, but voted against them. There is a memorial at the railway station and there are plans for a second memorial.

Unlike many other German cities, in 2004 the city council of Munich rejected the installation of Stolpersteine on public property, following objections raised by Munich's Jewish community (and particularly its chairwoman, Charlotte Knobloch, then also President of the Central Council of Jews in Germany, and herself a former victim of Nazi persecution). She objected to the idea that the names of murdered Jews be inserted in the pavement, where people might accidentally step on them. The vice president of the Central Council, Salomon Korn, however, warmly welcomed the idea at the same time. Christian Ude, then mayor of Munich, warned against an "inflation of monuments". Demnig also took part in the discussion, stating that "he intends to create a memorial at the very place where the deportation started: at the homes where people had lived last". The rejection was reconsidered and upheld in 2015; other forms of commemoration, like plaques on the walls of individual houses, and a central memorial displaying the names of the people deported from Munich, will be set up. The city's rejection of participation in the project only affects public property, however. As of 2020 around a hundred Stolpersteine have been installed on private property.

In other cities, permission for the project was preceded by long and sometimes emotional discussions. In Krefeld, the vice-chairman of the Jewish community, Michael Gilad, said that Demnig's memorials reminded him of how the Nazis had used Jewish gravestones as slabs for sidewalks. A compromise was reached that a Stolperstein could be installed if a prospective site was approved by both the house's owner and (if applicable) the victim's relatives. The city of Pulheim denied permission to install a Stolperstein for 12-year-old Ilse Moses, who was deported from Pulheim and murdered by the Nazi regime. The majority in the city council, CDU and FDP, opposed the project and prevented it. Starting in 2009, 23 Stolpersteine for the Belgian city of Antwerp have been produced; however, owing to local resistance to the project, they have been unable to be installed. They have been stored in Brussels, where they are regularly exhibited.

The Polish Institute of National Remembrance (IPN) has expressed reservations about the project, noting that the form of the memorial, particularly its location on regular sidewalks, which are regularly stomped over by passersby, is not respectful. Another criticism from IPN has concerned inadequate level of detail provided on Stolpersteine, such as lack of context clarifying that most of the perpetrators of the Holocaust were Germans and not Poles. IPN officials have repeatedly suggested that instead of Stolpersteine, the more respectful, informative and traditional form of remembrance that the IPN is willing to support instead takes the form of larger memorial plaques on the walls of nearby buildings.

On 25 September 2026, the German town of Heidenau banned future Stolpersteine, after a motion submitted by the CDU with support from the AfD was passed.

=== Support ===
The majority of German cities welcome the installation of Stolpersteine. In Frankfurt am Main, which had a long tradition of Jewish life before the Holocaust, the 1000th Stolperstein was set in May 2015, and newspapers publish progress reports and invitations for citizens to sponsor further memorial stones. In Frankfurt, the victim's descendants are not allowed to sponsor Stolpersteine; these have to be paid for by the current inhabitants of the house, ensuring that they will respect the monument.

=== Reactions of passers-by ===
People's attention is drawn towards the Stolpersteine by reports in newspapers and their personal experience. Their thoughts are directed towards the victims. Cambridge historian Joseph Pearson argues that,

it is not what is written [on the Stolpersteine] which intrigues, because the inscription is insufficient to conjure a person. It is the emptiness, void, lack of information, the maw of the forgotten, which gives the monuments their power and lifts them from the banality of a statistic.

== Development of a commemorative tradition ==
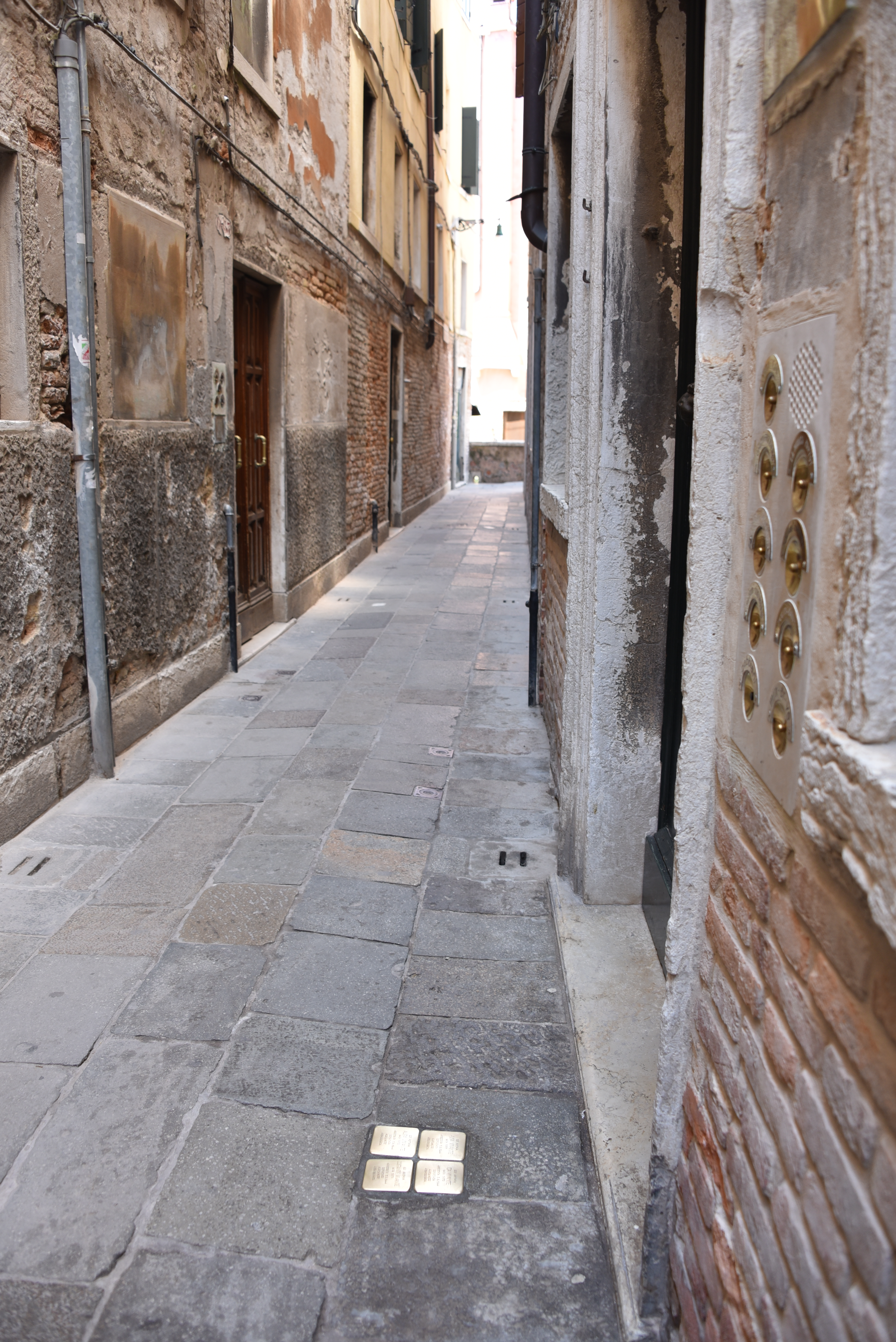
Stolpersteine in Venice

Often the installation of a new Stolperstein is announced in local newspapers or on the cities' official websites and is accompanied by a remembrance gathering. Citizens, school children and relatives of the persons who are commemorated on the plates are invited to take part. Often the citizens state that they are motivated by the idea that "they were our neighbours", and that they wish to remember the victims' names, or, symbolically, allow the deported to return to the place where they rightfully belong. If the person remembered on the plate was Jewish, their descendants are invited to attend the installation of the stone, and pray Kaddish, if they wish to do so.

Stolpersteine are installed in places where they are exposed to all kinds of climatic conditions, dust and dirt. As the brass material of the plates is subject to superficial corrosion, it will become dull over time if it is not cleaned from time to time. Demnig recommends regular cleaning of the plates. Many regional initiatives have set up schedules for cleaning and acts of remembrance, when Stolpersteine are adorned with flowers or candles. Often remembrance days are chosen for these activities:

- 27 January, International Holocaust Remembrance Day.
- Yom HaShoah, 27 Nisan (April–May)
- 12 June, birthday of Anne Frank
- 9 November, the German Kristallnacht Remembrance Day

== Documentary film ==
A documentary, Stolperstein, was made by Dörte Franke in 2008.

== Gallery ==
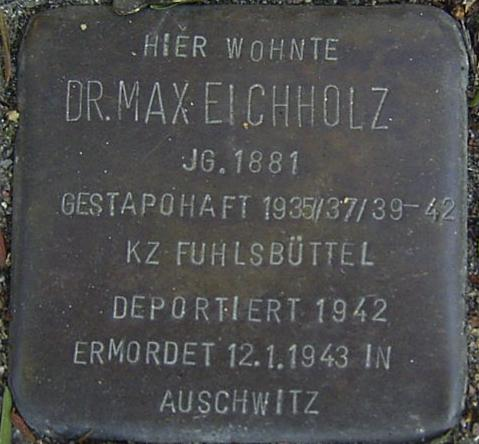
Stolperstein for politician Max Eichholz in Hamburg

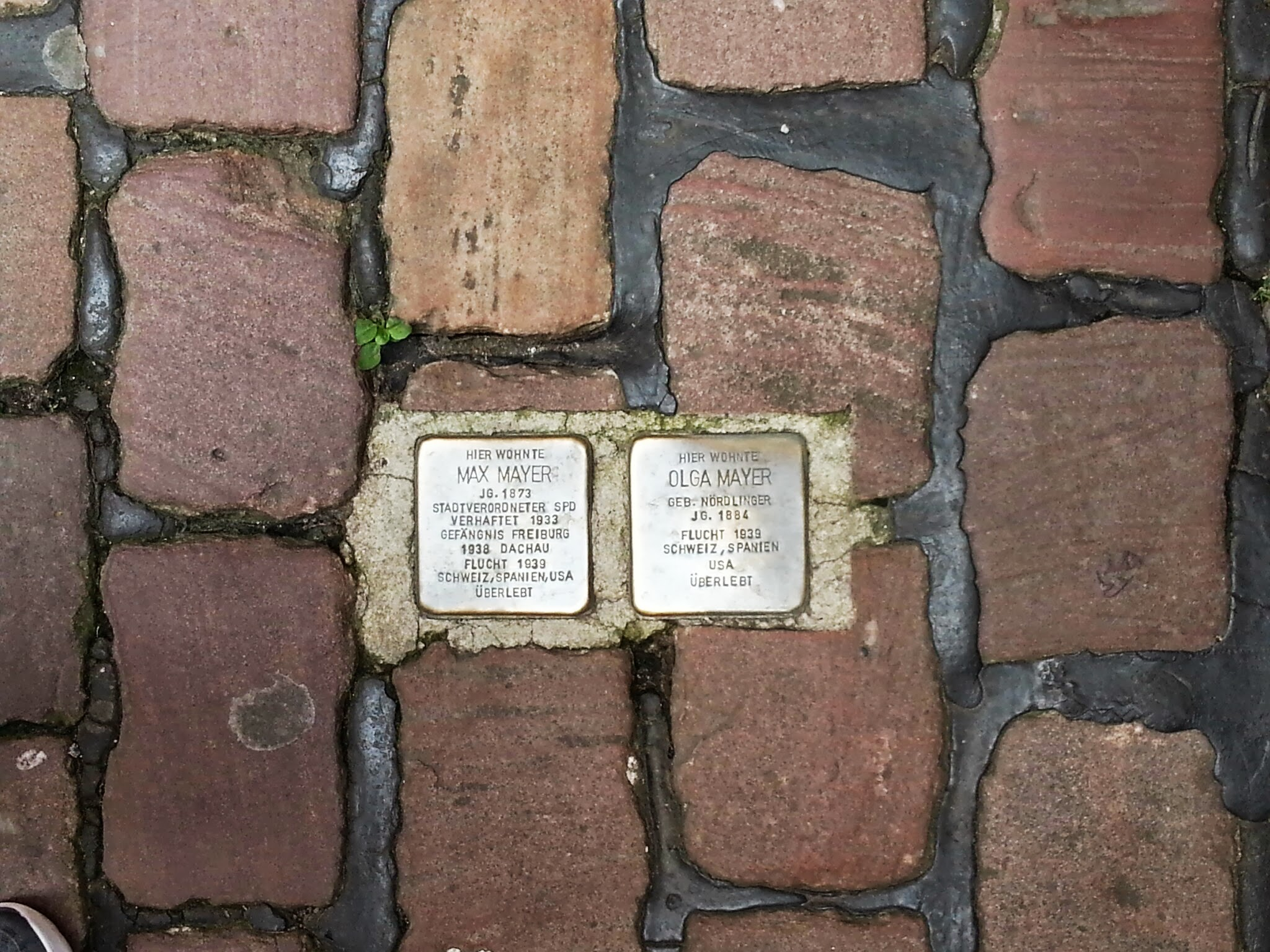
Stolpersteine for Max and Olga Mayer in Heidelberg

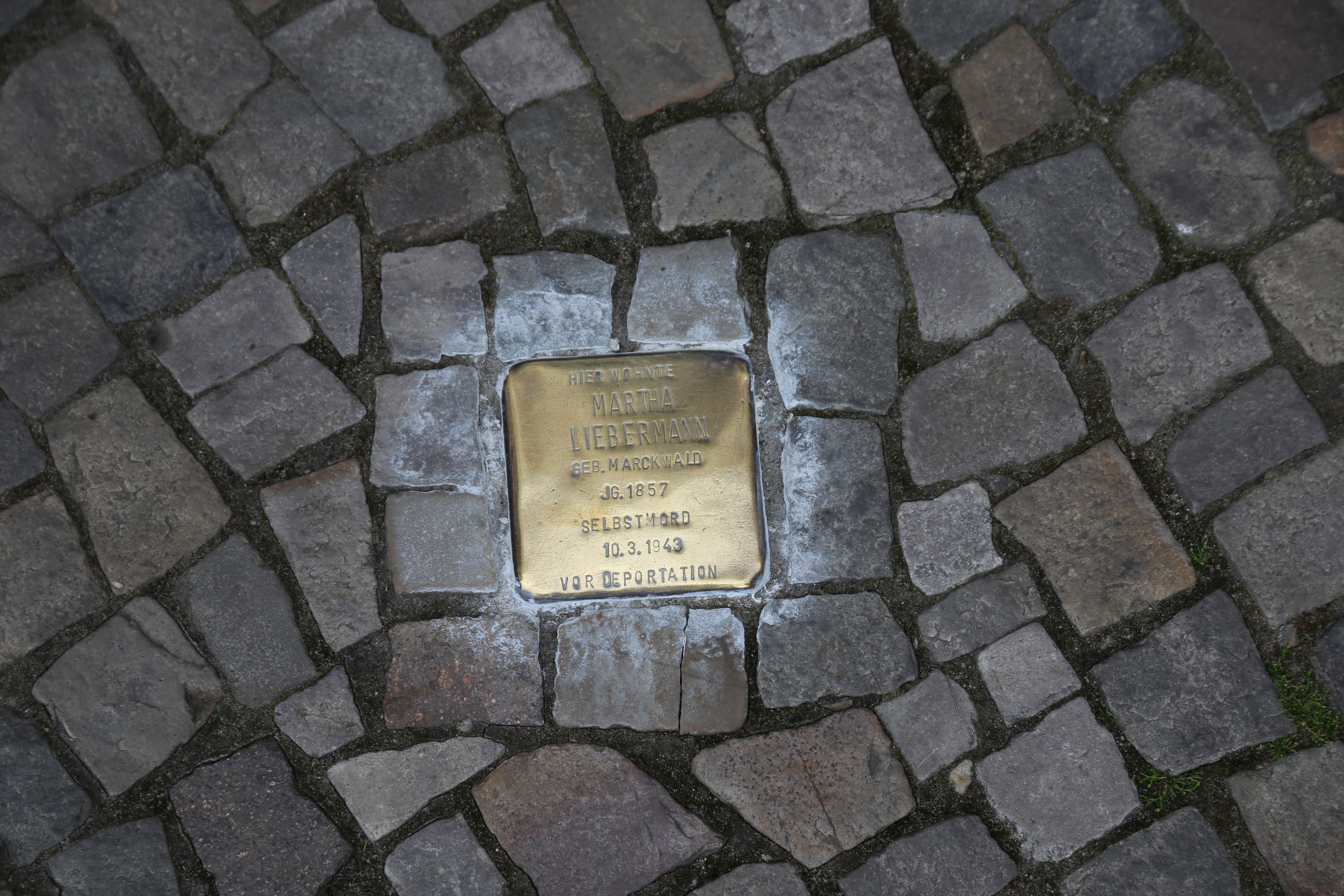
Stolperstein for Martha Liebermann, widow of artist Max Liebermann, Pariser Platz, Berlin

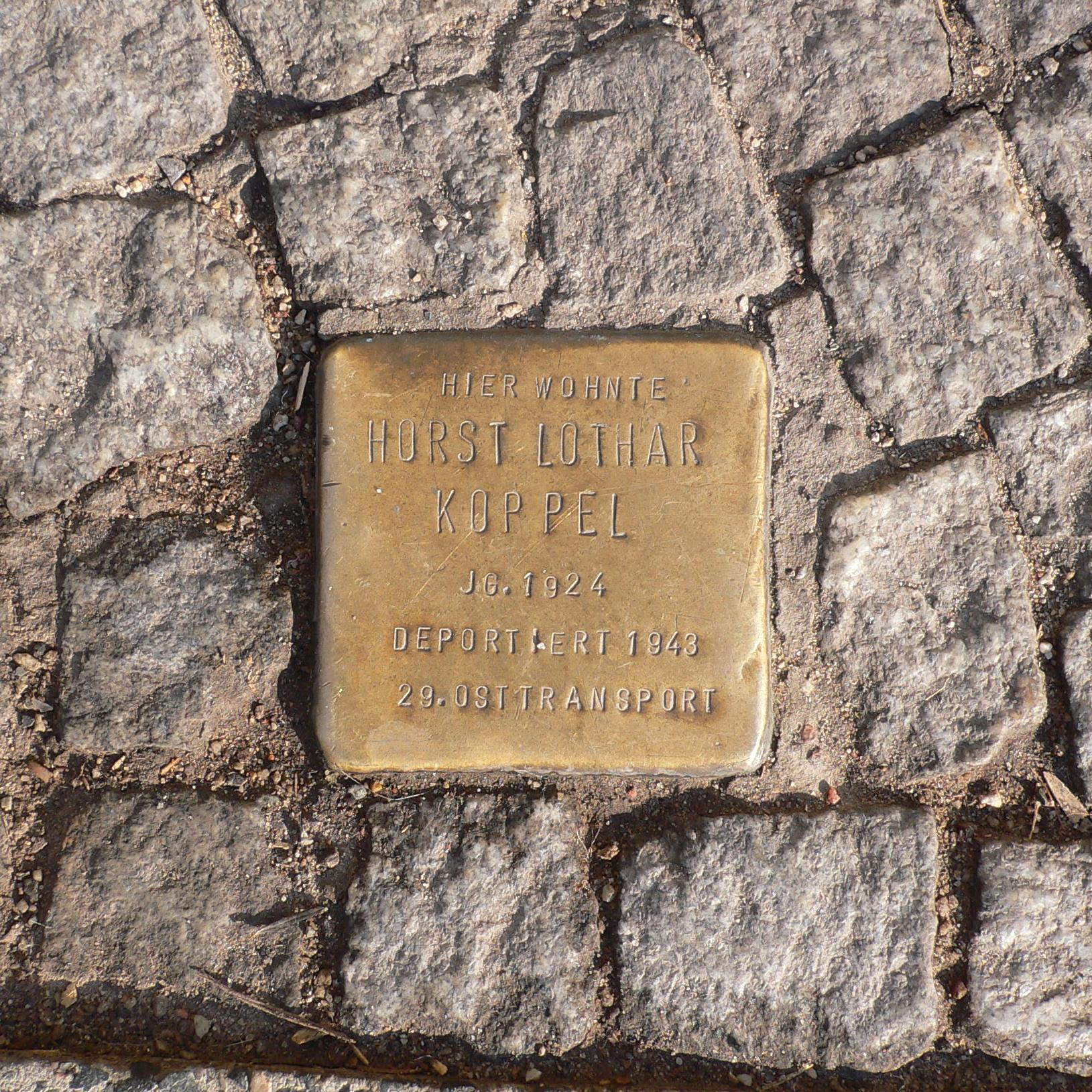
Stolperstein for Horst Lothar Koppel in Berlin

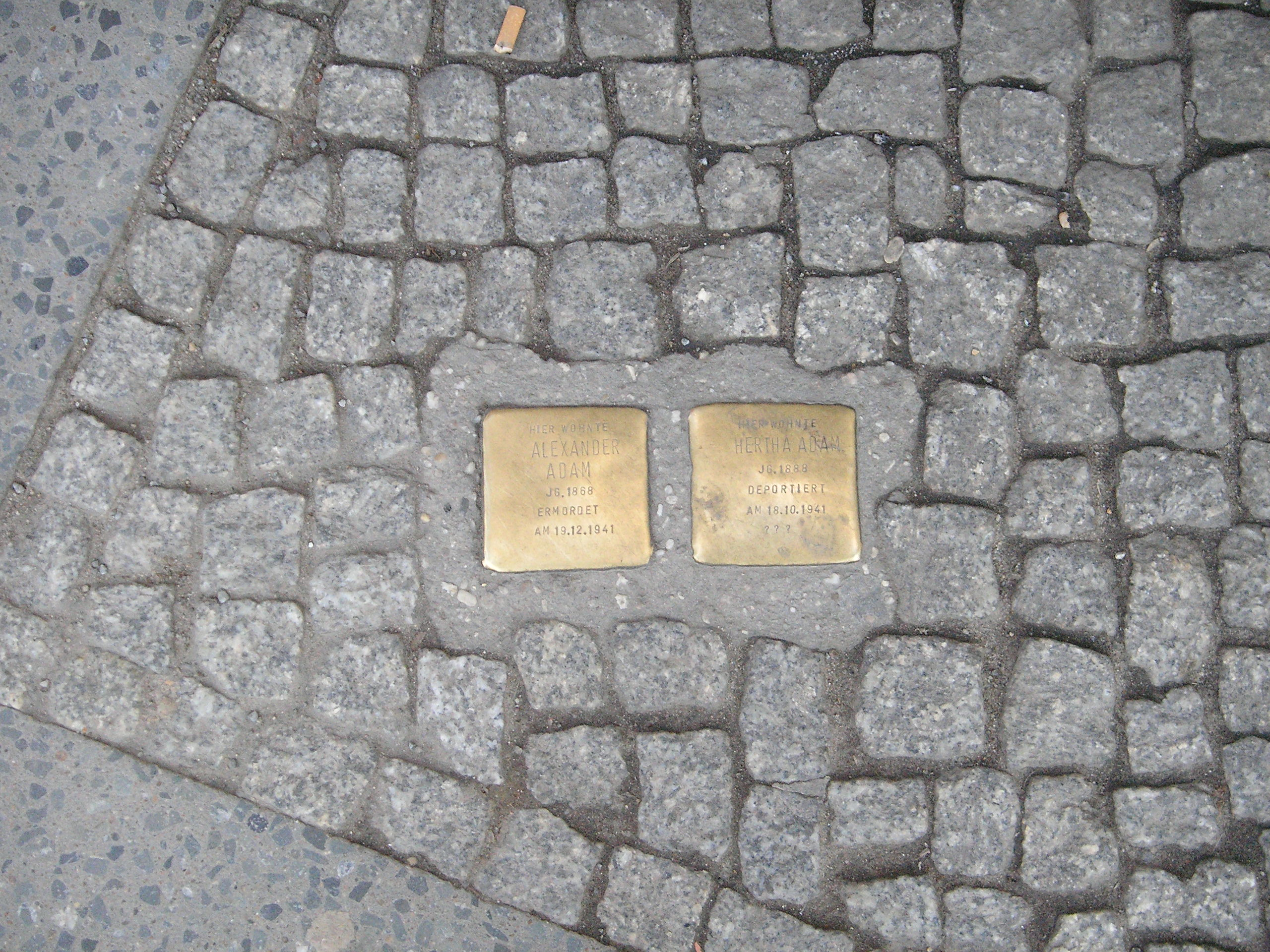
Stolpersteine for Hertha and Alexander Adam, Berlin-Friedrichshain

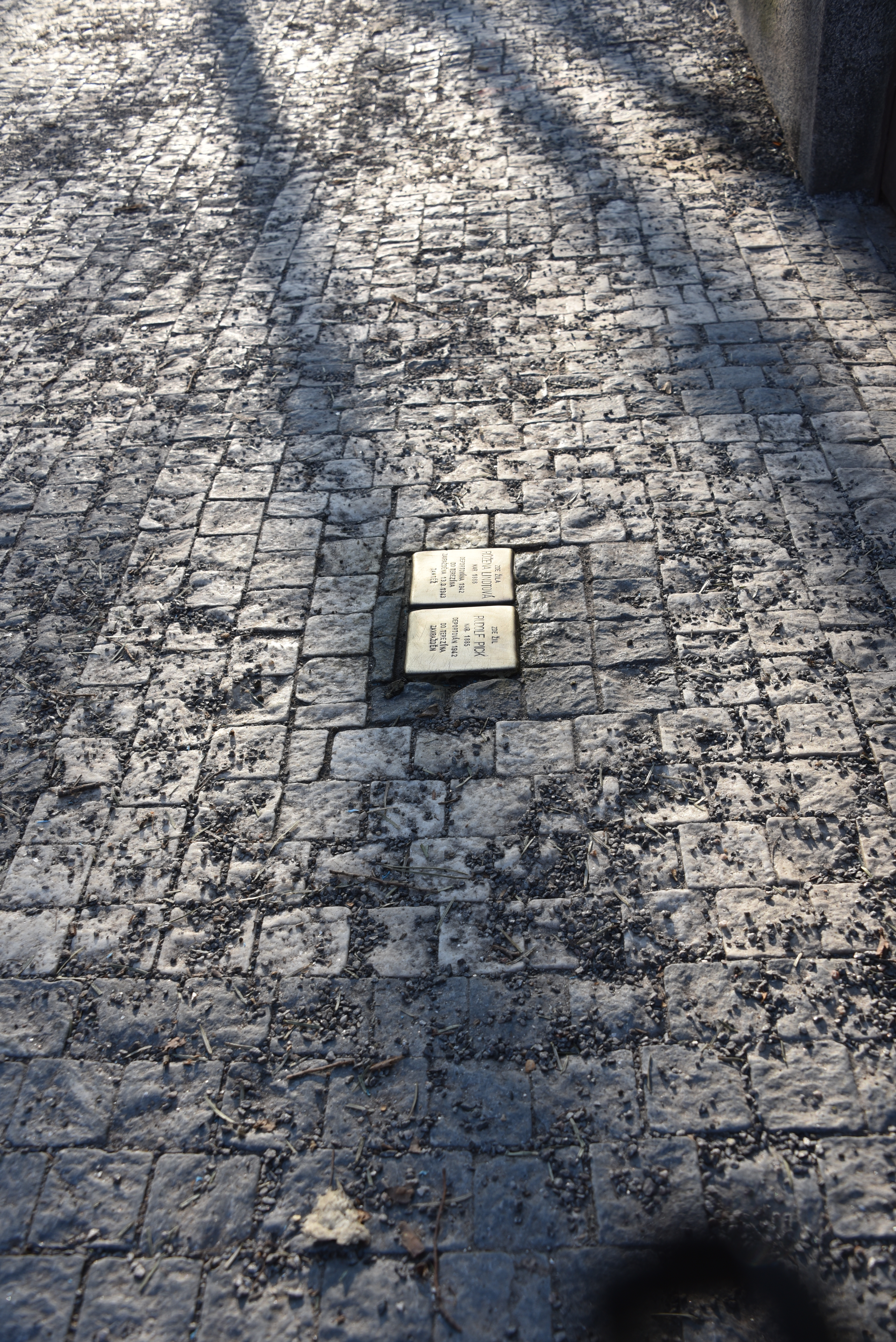
Stolpersteine for Růžena Lindtová and Rudolf Pick in Prague

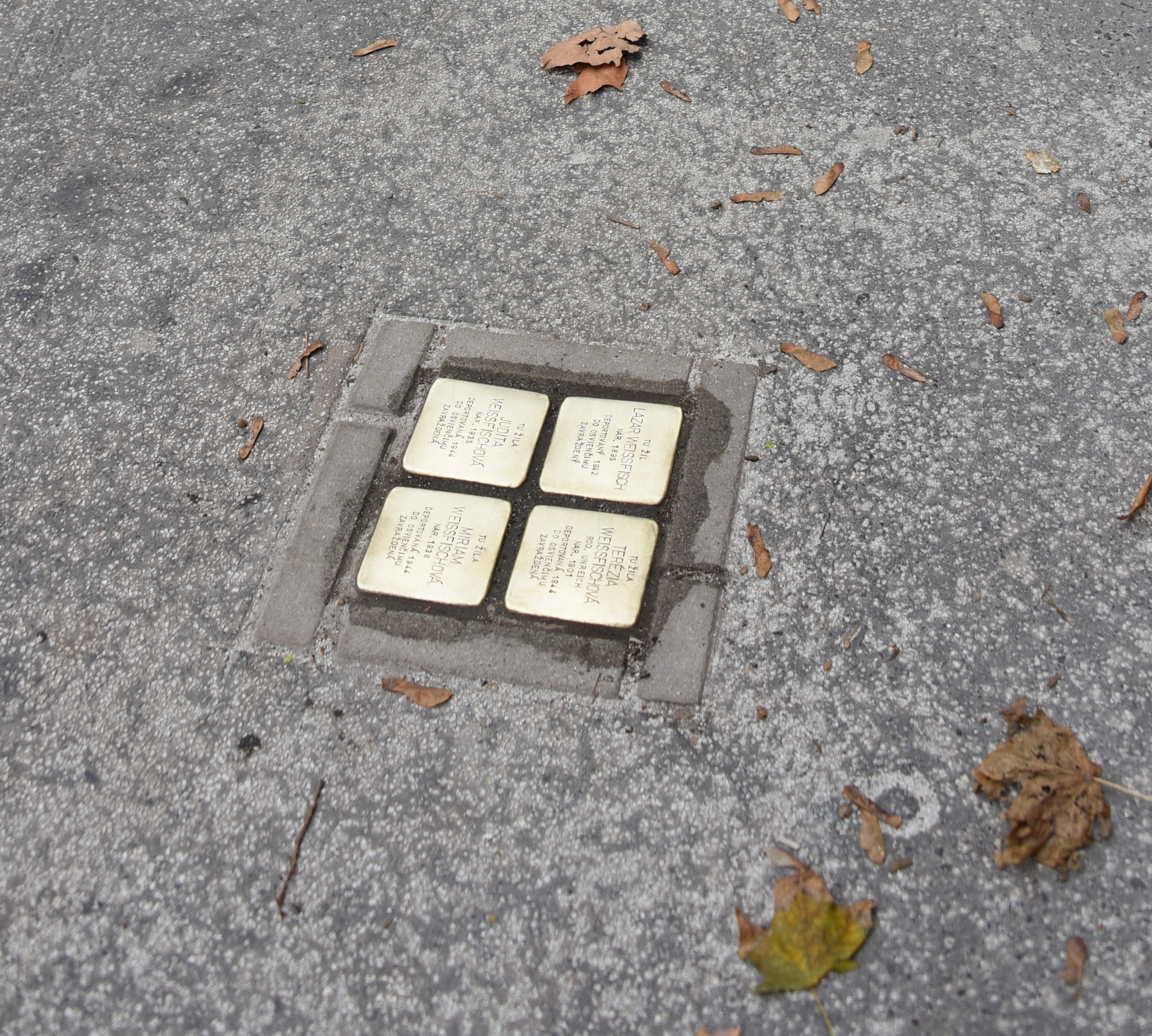
Stolpersteine for the Weissfisch family in Bratislava

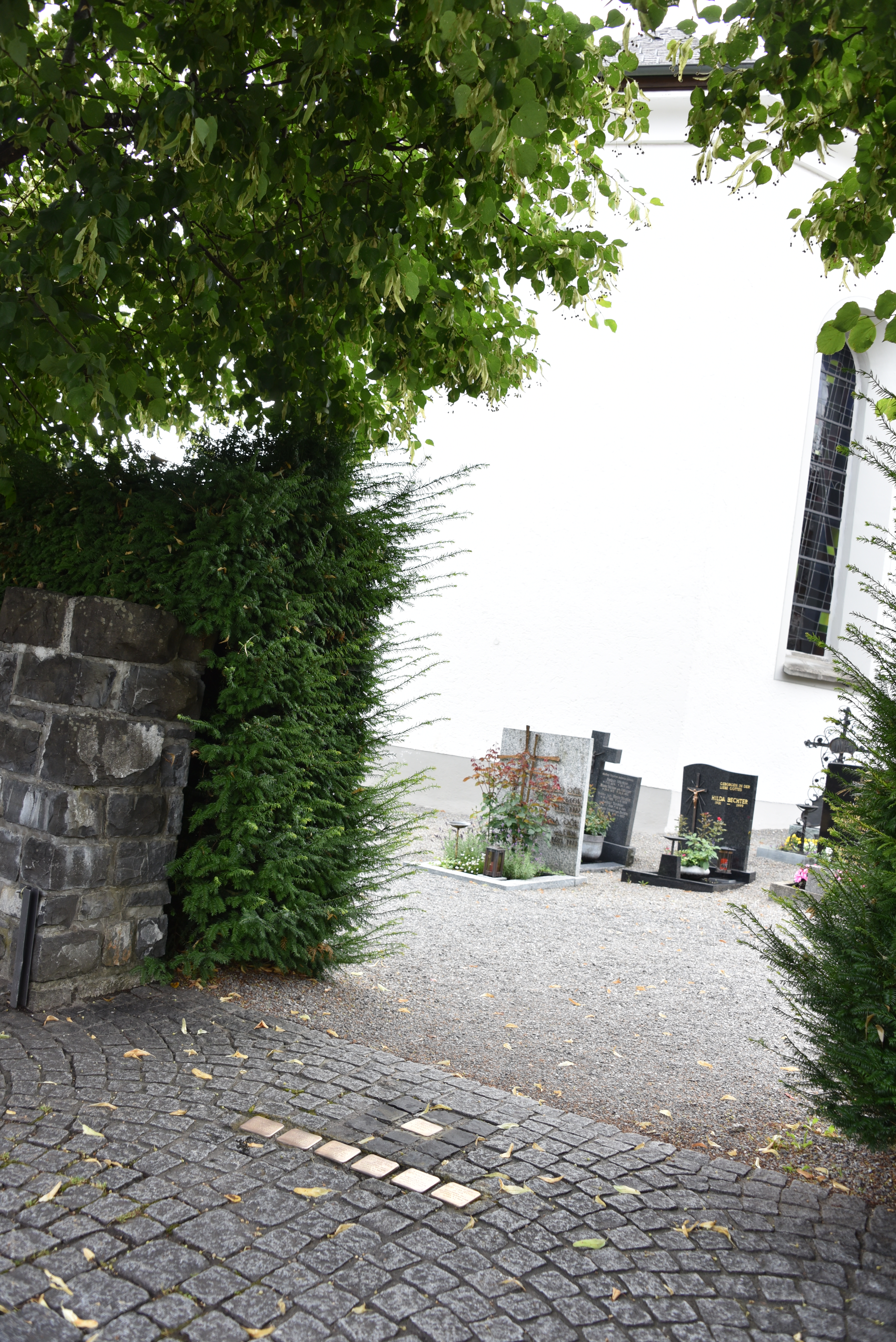
Stolpersteine for people with disabilities in Vorarlberg

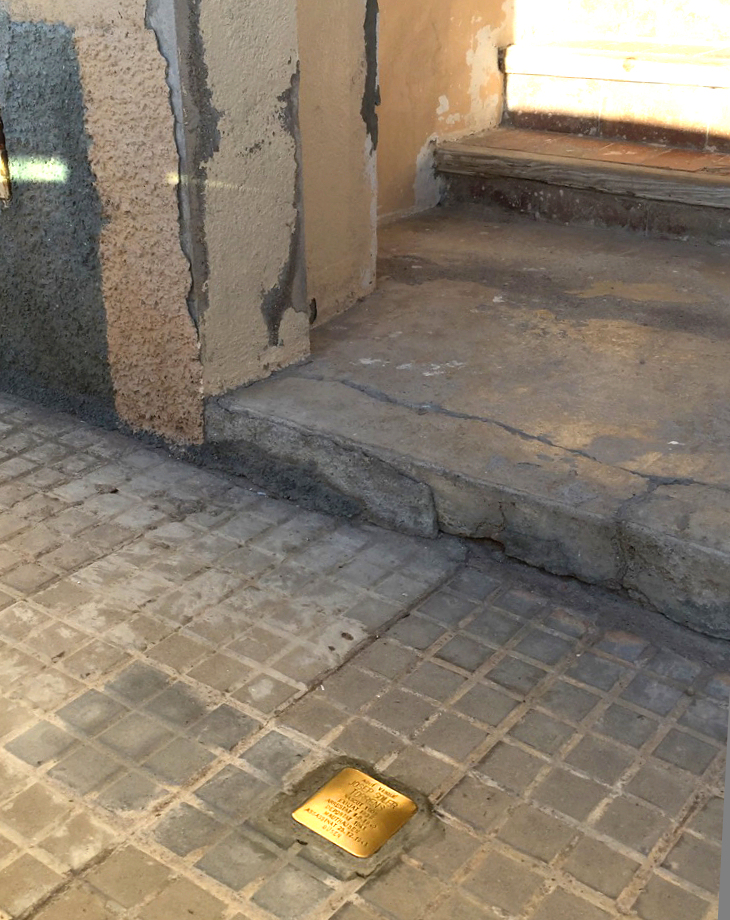
Stolperstein for Josep Soler Torrens in Spain

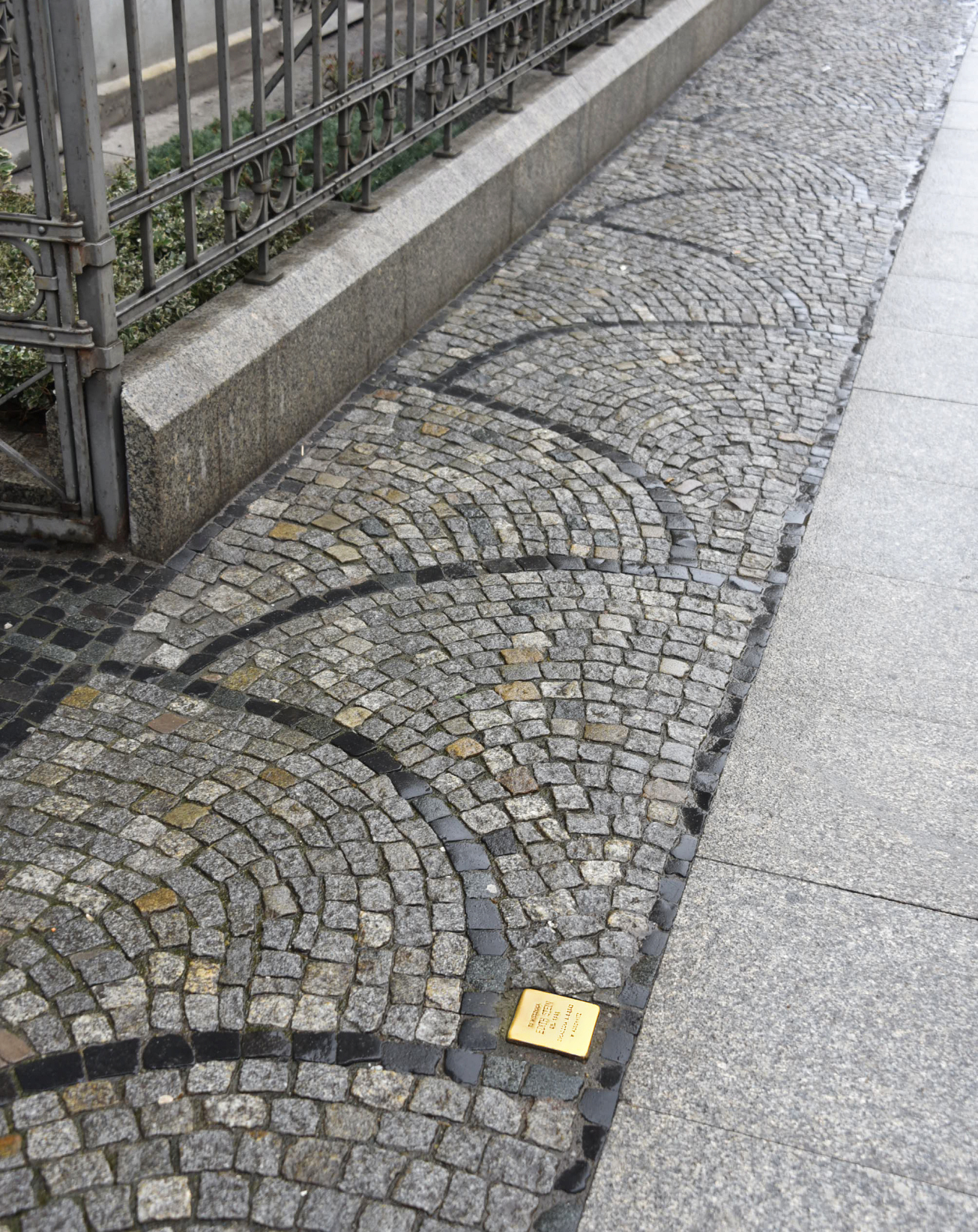
Stolperstein for Edith Stein in Wrocław

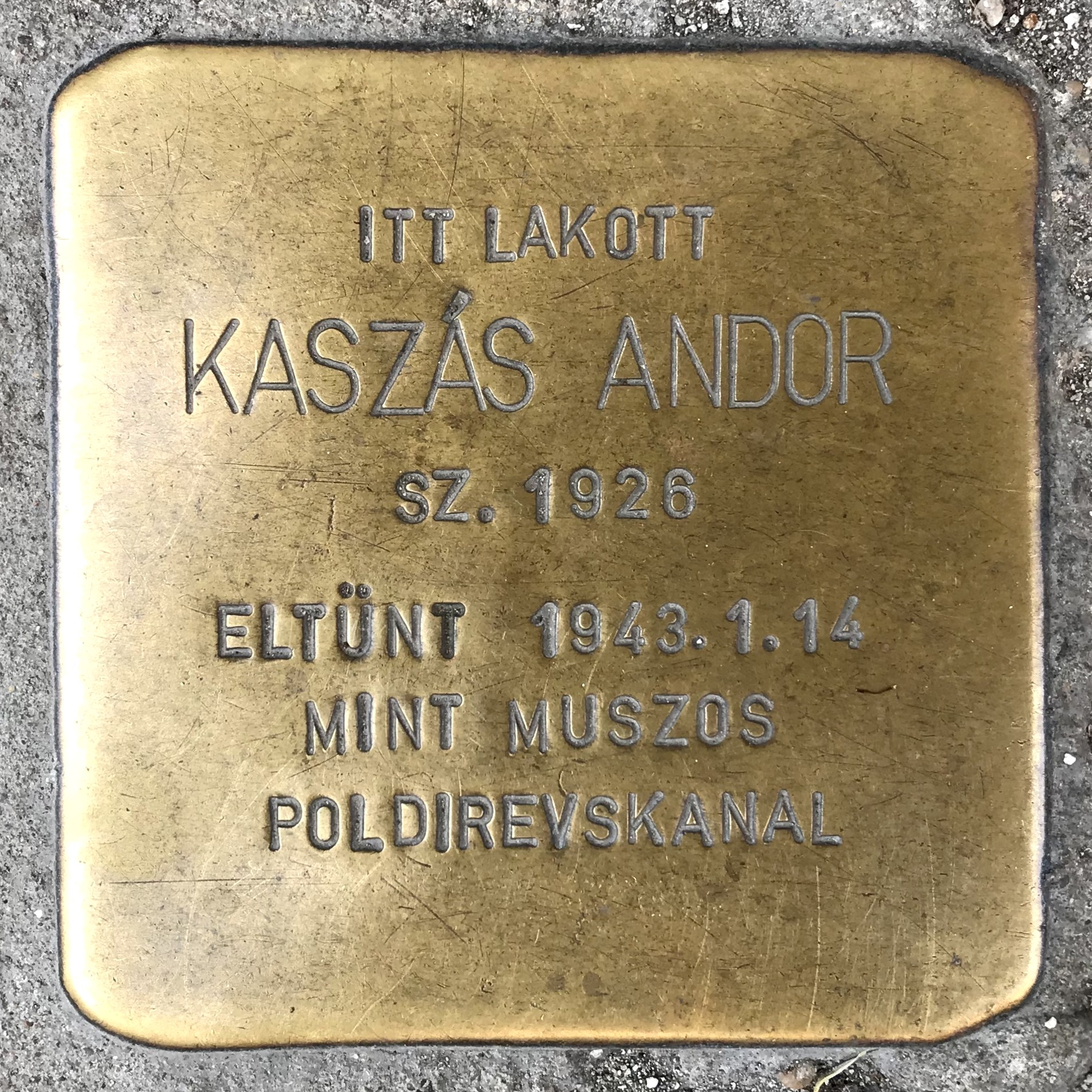
Stolperstein for Kaszás Andor in Budapest

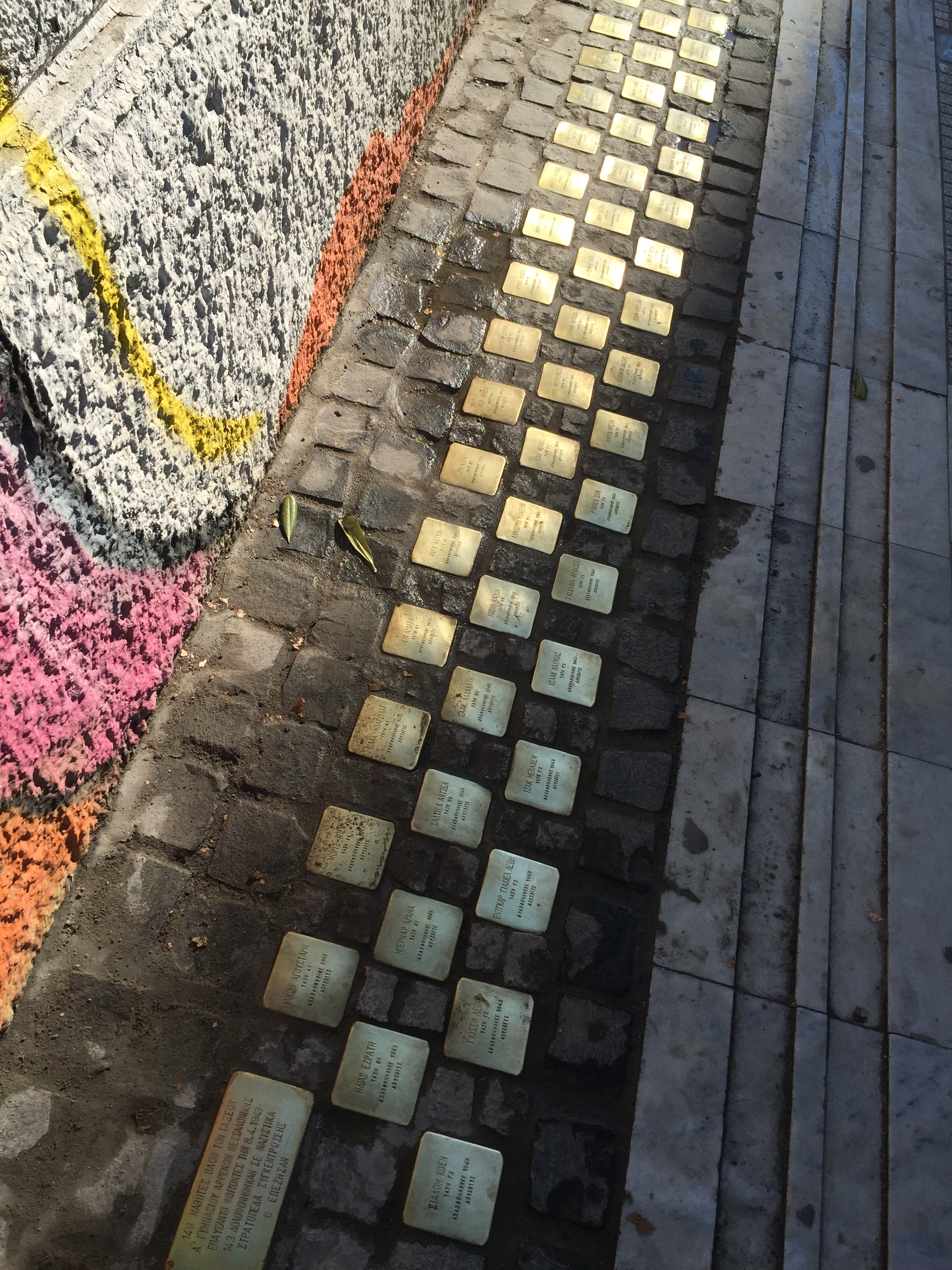
Stolpersteine for murdered schoolboys in Thessaloniki

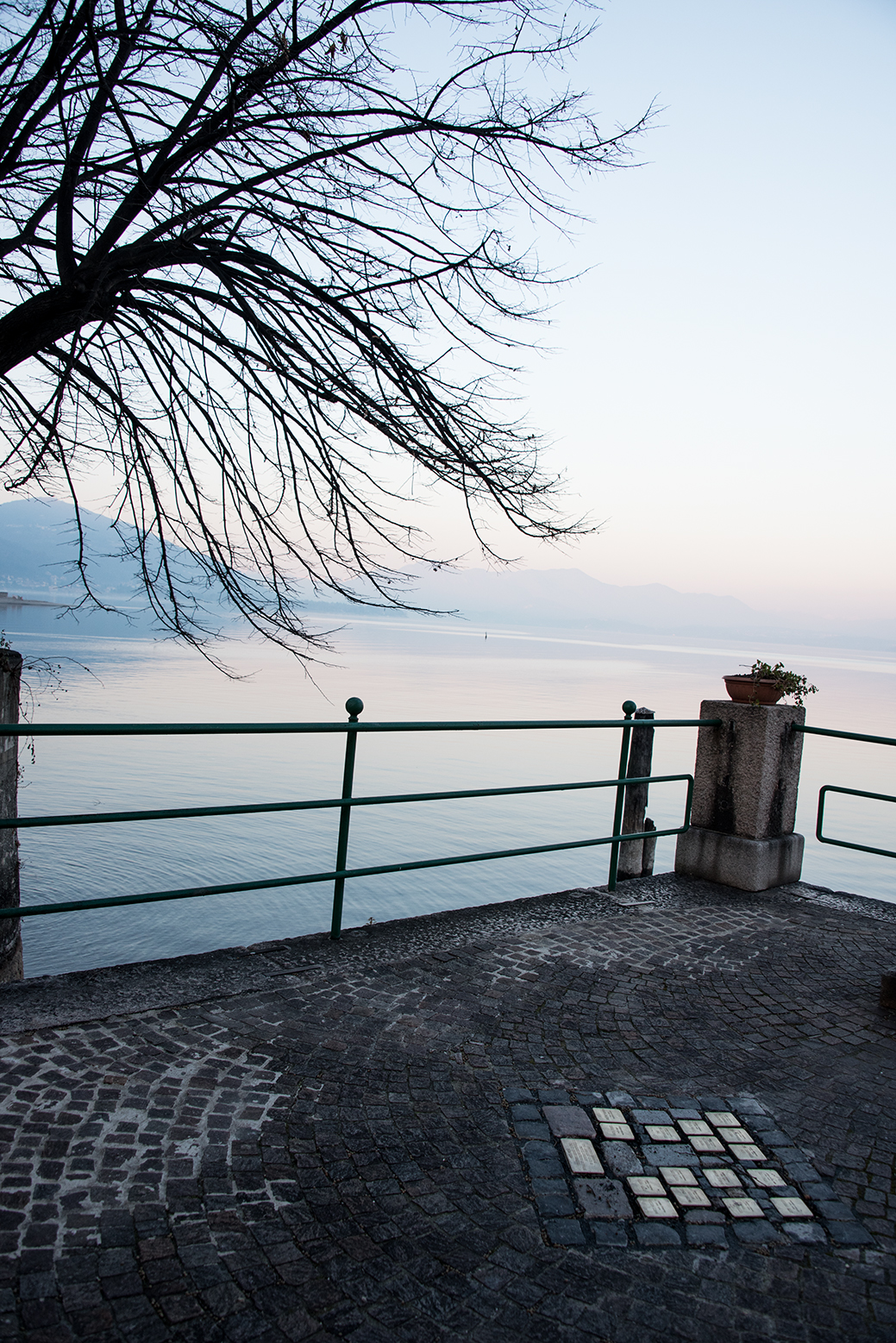
Stolpersteine for the victims of the massacre of Meina

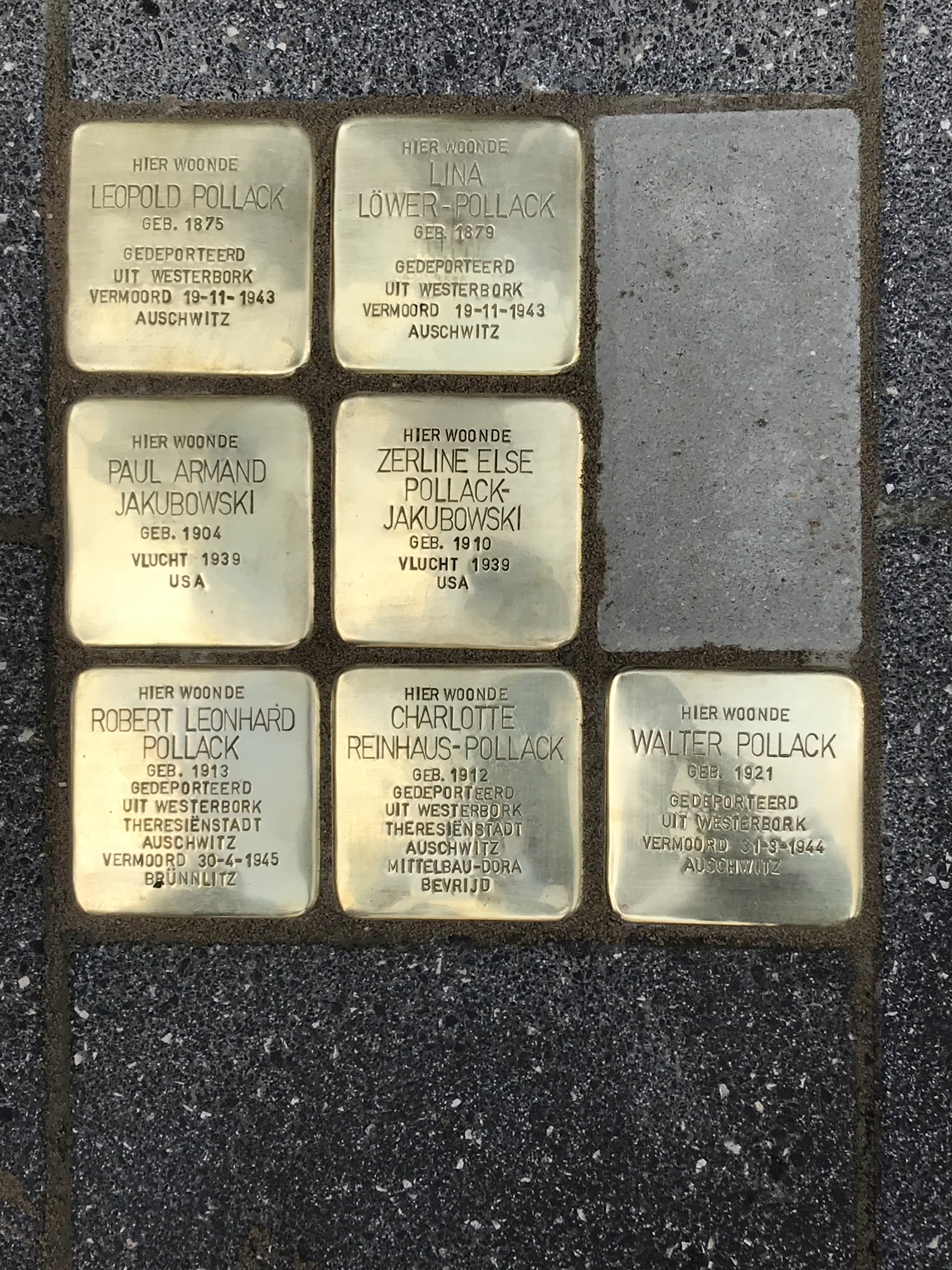
Stolpersteine for the Pollack family in Amsterdam

Stolpersteine for Leon Finci in Sarajevo

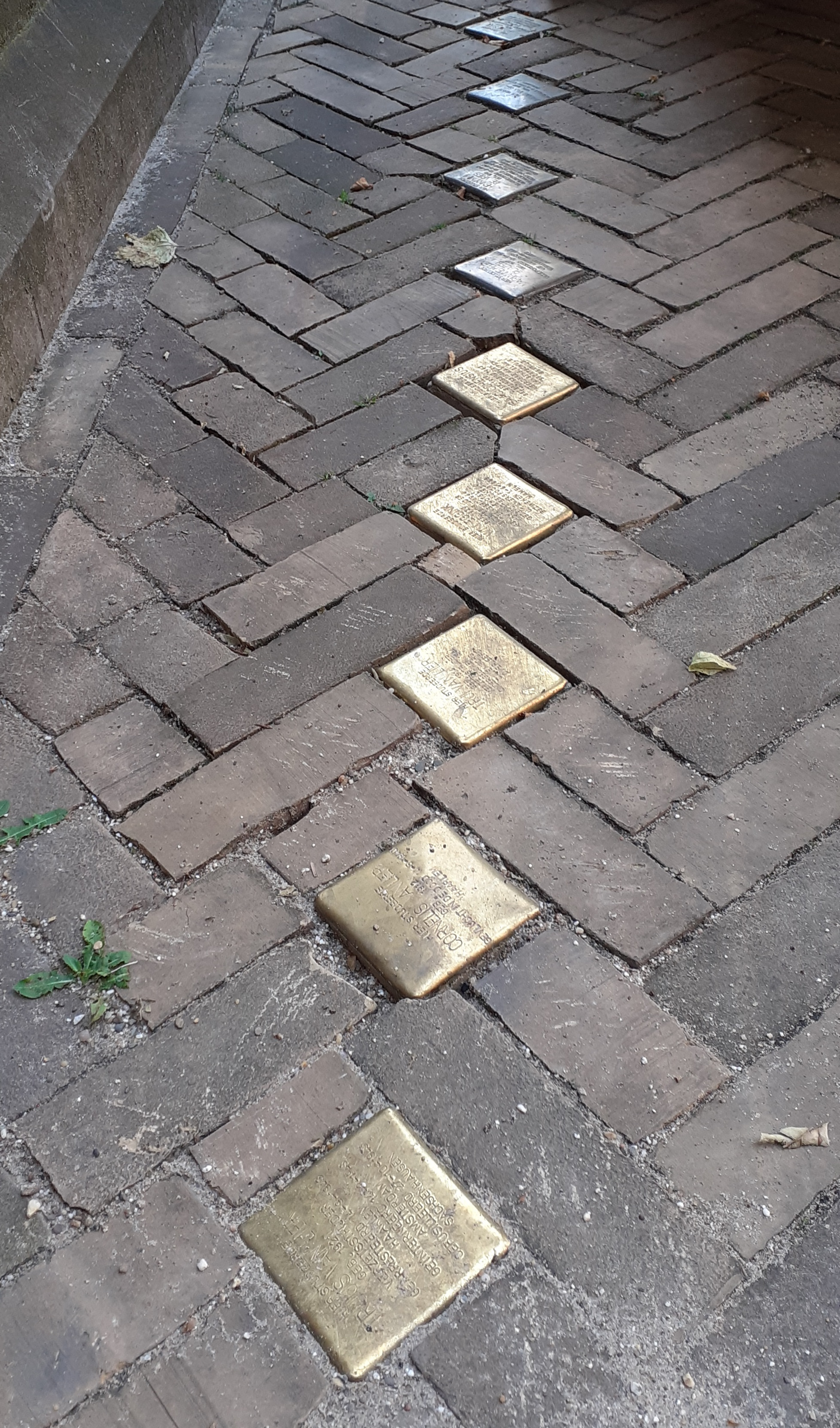
Stolpersteine in the Domplein, Utrecht

== Stolpersteine in different countries ==
- Austria: Stolpersteine in the district of Braunau am Inn
- Belgium: Stolpersteine in Charleroi
- Czech Republic: Prague: Josefov, Malá Strana, Vršovice and Modřany – Královéhradecký kraj
- Germany: Lake Constance district, Weingarten
- Lithuania: Stumbling Stones in Lithuania
- Norway: Snublesteiner i Norge

== See also ==
- List of places with stolpersteine
- Shoes on the Danube Bank
- Culture of Remembrance
- Vergangenheitsbewältigung ('Coming to terms with the past')
- Last Address

== Sources ==
- Berry, Adam (27 August 2026). "German town bans Holocaust memorial stones". The Telegraph. "More than 120,000 of them have been installed across 31 countries, mostly in Germany."
