= Spoerer =

Spoerer is a surname. Notable people with the surname include:

- Alberto Spoerer (1926–2015), Chilean surgeon and politician
- Manuel José Ossandón (born 1962), Chilean politician
- Patricia Spoerer (born 1972), Chilean politician
- Raúl Spoerer Carmona (1908–1985), Chilean naval engineer, businessman, and politician

== See also ==
- Sporer, another surname
