= Stolpersteine in Liguria =

Brass plate memorials in Liguria, Italy

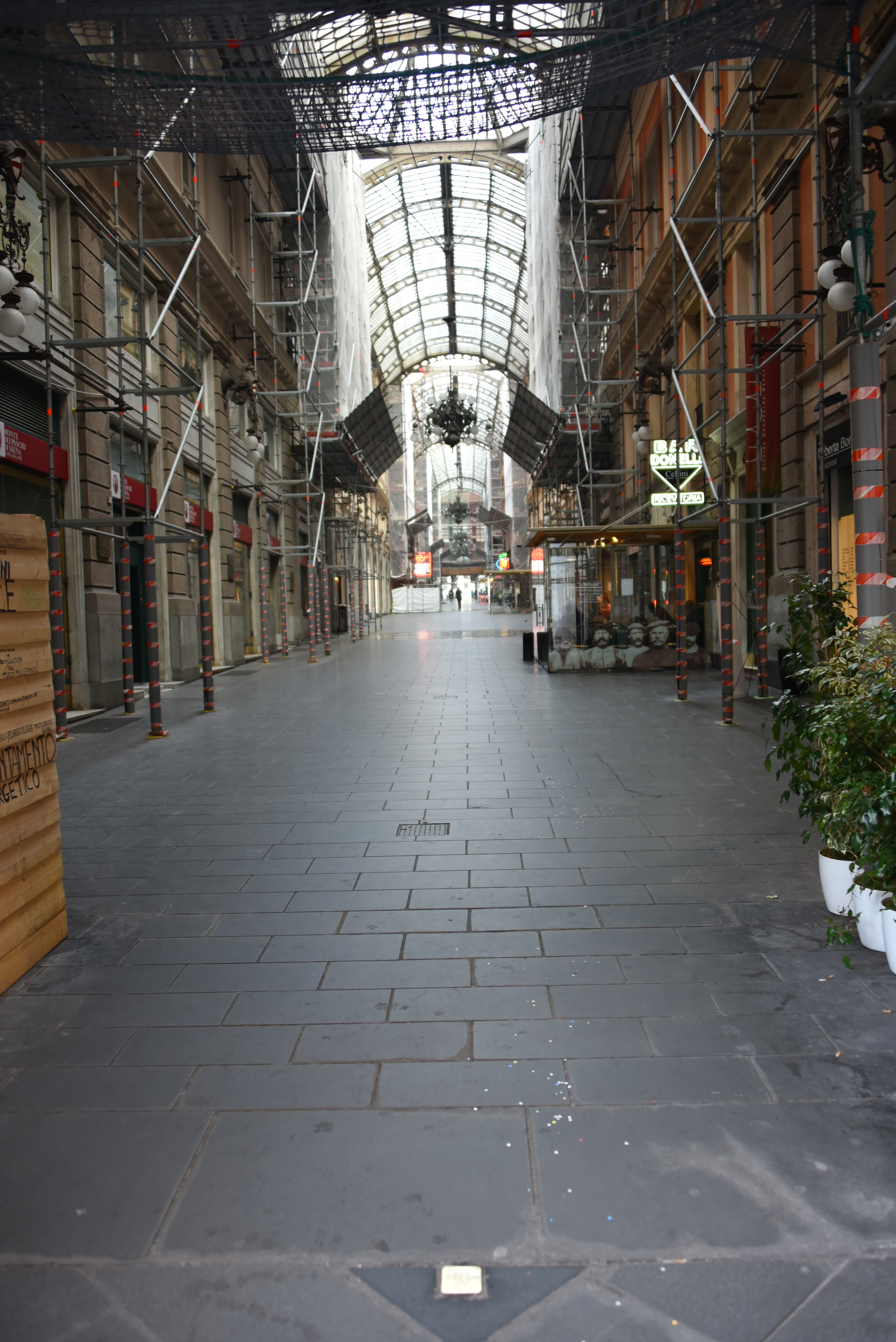
Stolperstein at the Galleria Mazzini

Stolpersteine is the German name for small, cobblestone-sized memorials installed all over Europe by German artist Gunter Demnig. They remember the fate of the victims of Nazi Germany being murdered, deported, exiled or driven to suicide. The first Stolperstein in Genoa, the capital of the Italian region of Liguria, was installed in January 2012.

Generally, the stumbling blocks are posed in front of the building where the victims had their last self chosen residence. The Stolperstein for Riccardo Reuven Pacifici was installed at the site of his arrest. The name of the Stolpersteine in Italian is pietre d'inciampo.

== Background ==
The short period of Nazi Germany ruling Italy from September 1943 to April 1945 left major traces of blood and sorrow. The major victims groups in Liguria were resistance fighters, people of Jewish origin and military personnel that did not adhere to the German controlled Italian Social Republic.

== Finale Ligure ==
Stone	Inscription	Location	Life and death
	HERE LIVED; ANTONIO ARNALDI; BORN 1925; ARRESTED 1.3.1944; DEPORTED; MAUTHAUSEN; LIBERATED	Via Cristoforo Colombo, 9	Antonio Arnaldi
	HERE LIVED; GIOVANNI FRATTINI; BORN 1917; ARRESTED 1.3.1944; DEPORTED; MAUTHAUSEN; LIBERATED	Via Tommaso Pertica, 16	Giovanni Frattini
	HERE LIVED; ITALO FRATTINI; BORN 1914; ARRESTED 1.3.1944; DEPORTED; MAUTHAUSEN; MURDERED 30.7.1944	Via Tommaso Pertica, 16	Italo Frattini
	HERE LIVED; GOFFREDO; SCACCIOTTI; BORN 1894; ARRESTED 1.3.1944; DEPORTED; MAUTHAUSEN; MURDERED 4.12.1944	Vico Serra, 2	Goffredo Scacciotti

== Genoa ==
The Jews of Genoa lived, like all Jews of Italy, with limitations of their freedom and suffered periodic expulsions. The "ghetto" was moved to piazza dei Tessitori in 1674. In the 17th century it was planned to move it again, but an expulsion decree prevented the project. However, in recent history Italian Jews did not have to fear for their lives — except during the short and deadly period in which Nazi German occupied large parts of Italy.

The synagogue of Genoa was built in 1935 by architect Francesco Morandi. It is located in via Bertora, a few steps from via Assarotti. It was there that the Germans convened a meeting in November 1943. The intention of the Nazis was to arrest all Jews of Genoa in a single stroke. Fifty Jews appeared, among them were also chief rabbi Riccardo Pacifici, his wife and their children of 2 and 4 years. All detainees were deported to Auschwitz concentration camp on 3 November 1943 where they were all murdered.

Stone	Inscription	Location	Life and death
	HERE LIVED; ERCOLE DE ANGELIS; BORN 1882; CAPTURED 2.10.1944; DEPORTED; FLOSSENBURG; MURDERED 18.4.1945	Via Carlo Barabino 26	Ercole De Angelis was born on 6 February 1882 in Casale Monferrato. His parents were Giuseppe De Angelis and Eleonora Segré. He was married to Fortunata Foà. Because of his Jewish origin, he was arrested in Genova on 2 October 1944, transported to the Bolzano Transit Camp, and deported from there to the Flossenbürg concentration camp in December 1944. Ercole De Angelis was murdered by the Nazi regime on 18 April 1945, a few days before the collapse of the regime.
	GIORGIO LABÓ; BORN 1895; FALLEN FOR LIBERTY; SHOT IN ROME; BY THE NAZIS; 7 MARCH 1944; GOLD MEDAL OF; MILITARY VALOR	Via Roma 1; 44°24′31″N 8°56′06″E	Giorgio Labò, born on 29 May 1919 in Modena, was a young architect, art critic and resistance fighter. He was the only son of Enrica Morpurgo and Mario Labó (1884-1961). His father was a well known architect and historian of architecture. After 9 September 1943, he joined the Gruppi di Azione Partigiana (G.A.P.) in Rome and carried the nom de guerre "Lamberto". He was arrested by the German SS on 1 February 1944, and bestialized in the Via Tasso prison. Nevertheless, he refused to reveal the names of his fellow fighters. On 7 March 1944, Giorgio Labò was executed in Forte Bravetta, without trial, without verdict. The Stolperstein is located in front of Via Roma 1, where his family lived during the time of his assassination — in the immediate vicinity of Riccardo Pacifici's Stolperstein. Posthumously he received the Gold Medal of Military Valor. A square in Genoa was named after him. Two books, one by Camillo Sbarbaro (1969), the other one by Pietro Boragina (2011), describe his life. A foundation in Genoa, the Fondazione Mario e Giorgio Labò, bears the names of father and son.
	HERE WAS ARRESTED; 3.11.1943; REUVEN; RICCARDO PACIFICI; CHIEF RABBI; OF GENOA; BORN 1904; MURDERED 11.12.1943; AUSCHWITZ	Galleria Mazzini; 44°24′30″N 8°56′06″E	Riccardo Reuven Pacifici was born on 18 February 1904 in Florence. He came from a Sephardic family, his parents were Gilda Borghi and Mario Mordechai Pacifici. After graduating from high school, he graduated at the University of Florence in 1926 summa cum laude. In 1927, he began studying at the Collegio Rabbinico di Firenze. He concluded his studies with the title of a Chachàm ha shalèm (Senior Rabbi). From 1928 to 1930, he was Vicerabbi of Venice, from 1930 director of the Rabbinical College of Rhodes, where he also became Chied Rabbi. In 1936, he was appointed Chief Rabbi of Genoa. Pacifici remained with his community during the difficult years of the war and the persecution of the Jews, and for several times visited the internment camp at Ferramonti di Tarsia. He gave moral support and spiritual assistance to the detainees. Reuven Riccardo Pacifici was betrayed to the German occupation authorities, arrested, and taken to Auschwitz concentration camp where he and his wife Wanda Abenaim and a number of other members of the Pacifici family were murdered by the Nazi regime. His death occurred on the 11th or 12 December 1943. A grandson of Riccardo Reuven Pacifici, Riccardo Pacifici, is the current president of the Jewish community of Rome.
		Corso Monte Grappa 37	Italo Vitale was born on 1 August 1886 in Genoa. His parents were Samuele Vitale and Enrichetta De Benedetti. He was of Jewish origin. On 10 December 1943 he was arrested in his hometown. Thereafter he was deported to Milan, where he was kept imprisoned in the San Vittore Prison. On 30 January 1944 he was deported with Convoi No. 6 to Auschwitz concentration camp where he arrived one week later. Italo Vitale was killed by the Nazi regime, he did not survive the Shoah.

== Ronco Scrivia ==
Stone	Inscription	Location	Life and death
	HERE LIVED; GIOVANNI CARMINATI; BORN 1916; ARRESTED 10.4.1944; DEPORTED; GUSEN; MURDERED 29.1.1945	Via Filippo Corridoni	Giovanni Carminati was born on 9 August 1916 in Brembilla in the province of Bergamo. He was a resistance fighter. De Angelis was arrested on 10 April 1944 and deported to Mauthausen concentration camp, where he was used for forced labor in the Gusen subcamp. He was forced to work for German arms manufacturers. Ercole De Angelis was murdered in the end of January 1945. In Isola del Cantone, a community in the neighborhood of Ronco Scrivia, can be found a commemorative plaque in his honor.

== Installation dates ==
The Stolpersteine of Genova were all installed by Gunter Demnig personally. The installations took place at the following dates:

- 29 January 2012: Galleria Mazzini
- 7 March 2013: Via Roma 1
- 14 January 2017: Via Carlo Barabino 26

== See also ==
- List of places with Stolpersteine
