= Lifnei iver =

Prohibition against misleading people by use of a "stumbling block"

In Judaism, Lifnei Iver (Hebrew: לִפְנֵי עִוֵּר, romanized: lifnê ʿiwwēr, "Before the Blind") is a Hebrew expression defining a prohibition against misleading people by use of a "stumbling block", or allowing a person to proceed unawares in unsuspecting danger or culpability. The origin comes from the commandment וְלִפְנֵ֣י עִוֵּ֔ר לֹ֥א תִתֵּ֖ן מִכְשֹׁ֑ל וְיָרֵ֥אתָ מֵּאֱלֹהֶ֖יךָ "Before the blind, do not put a stumbling block" (Leviticus 19:14).

The Hebrew term lifnei iver is one of the offenses which the Talmud argues to be punishable by excommunication in Judaism.

The stumbling block as a distinct, and negative, concept is also established in Christian theology: in the Catholic Church, it is known as creating scandal.

== Biblical context ==
The regulation appears among a brief miscellany of regulations concerning ethical behaviour, covering issues such as consideration of the deaf, an "evil tongue", not bearing grudges, the impartiality of justice, and leaving gleanings for the poor demonstrate similar concerns against exploiting individuals, but focus on different issues.

== In Jewish oral law ==
Many halakhic principles are derived from lifnei iver, the oral Torah expanding its ramifications beyond a purely literal interpretation. In classical rabbinical literature, lifnei iver is seen as a figuratively expressed prohibition against misleading people; the Sifra (a midrash from the time of the Mishnah) argues that since the recipient of advice would be metaphorically blind in regard to its accuracy, they would metaphorically stumble if the advice was damaging or otherwise bad.

The Talmud extends the principle to also prohibit the facilitation of a sinful act by another individual, where the person in question would otherwise have lacked the opportunity or means to have committed the sin; for example, the Talmud takes the regulation to prohibit the giving of a cup of wine to someone who has taken the nazirite vow (which includes a vow to not partake in wine or grape products). The Talmud expresses caution in regard to figurative interpretations of this principle, emphasising that the law only really covers those situations where the other individual could not possibly have committed the transgression without the aid of the first person violating the lifnei iver rule; this is known in the Talmud as two sides to the river (Trei Ivrah deNaharah)—if, for example, the person who took a nazirite vow had been about to take a glass of wine anyway, then handing them a glass of wine would not transgress lifnei iver. Examples of Lifnei iver: as Amnon had sought the advice of Jonadab in order to rape his half sister Tamar, Absalom had sought the advice of Ahitophel who advised Absalom to have incestuous relations with his father's concubines in order to show all Israel how odious he was to his father [2 Samuel 16:20].

Lifnei iver as a principle recurs many times in more practical applications of Jewish law. For example, the Shulchan Aruch, an authoritative codification of Jewish Law (Halacha), warns a father to not physically chastise older children, as this will only entice them to hit back, which in its view would be a capital offence.

== Academic perspectives ==
According to the editors of the 1906 Jewish Encyclopedia, the prevailing notion in ancient Middle Eastern cultures was that bodily ailments and defects, such as blindness and loss of hearing, as well as circumstantial ailments, such as poverty, were punishments for sin; the blind, together with cripples and lepers, were outcast by society and were prevented from entering towns, becoming paupers as a result. The biblical provision of laws to protect individuals afflicted in this manner would have had the effect, perhaps intended, of reducing the prejudice they suffered.

== See also ==
- Stolperstein, German expression for "stumbling block", a kind of memorial artwork by Gunter Demnig commemorating those deported and killed by the Nazis
- Stumbling block
