= Stumbling block =

In the Bible, something that leads to sin

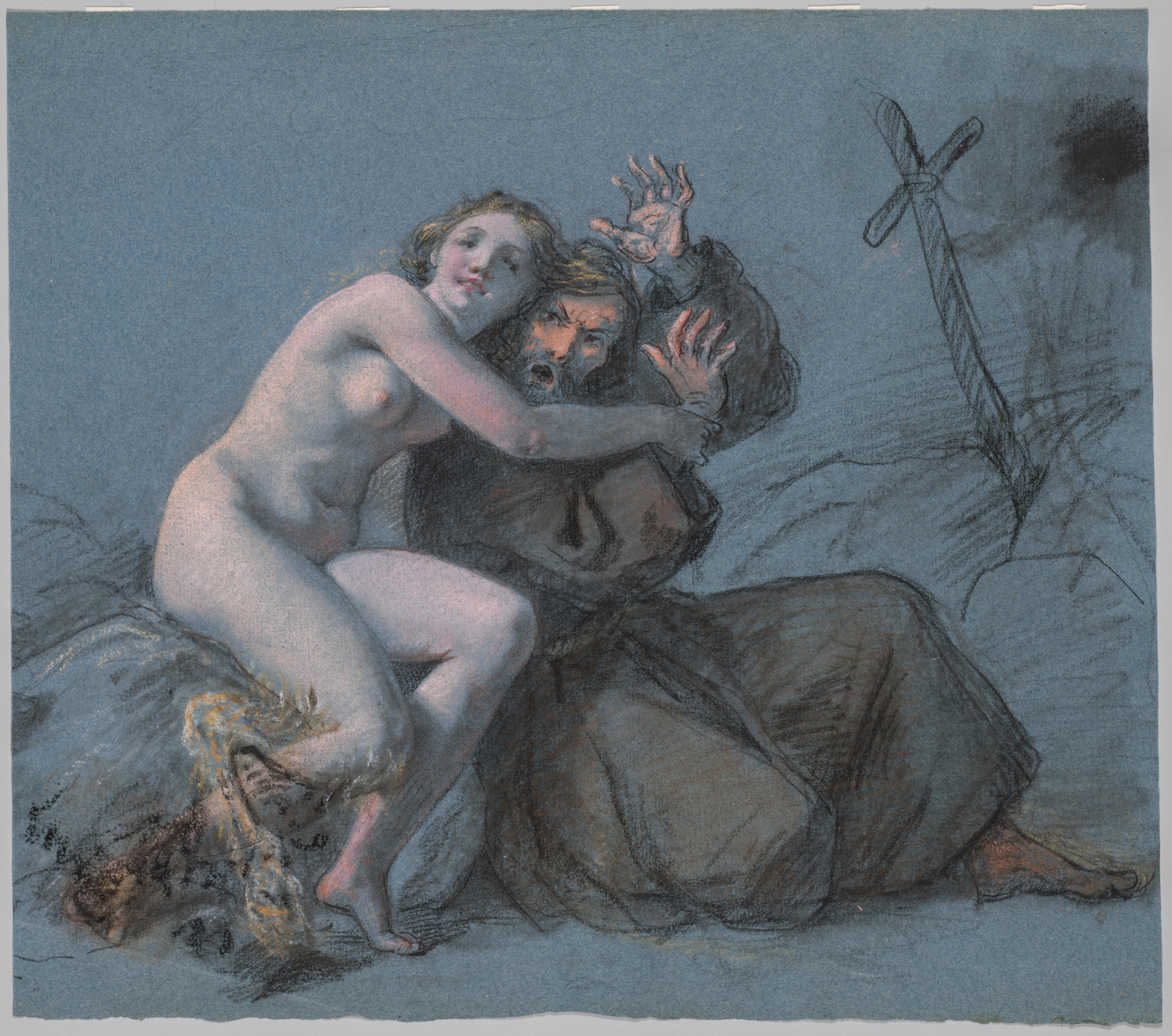
The temptation of St Anthony is an example of a biblical trap-stick

The Koine Greek word, skándalon (Strong's 4625) means either a 'trap-stick' or a 'stumbling block'. In the Bible, skándalon is used figuratively to mean either something that causes people to sin, or something that causes them to lose their faith in Jesus.

1. A trap-stick: a stick holding open a baited trap; when a creature touches it, it releases the trap door to capture the prey. This figuratively refers to a person that entices someone into wrongdoing, getting them to thereby harm or destroy themselves. For example, Peter tempting Christ to refuse the crucifixion. Causing others to sin endangers their connection to God and potentially destroys their souls. If the victim thereby falls into mortal sin, the scandalous deed is considered to be likewise mortal sin.
2. A stumbling stone or tripwire: anything that makes someone trip and fall. This figuratively means "something that causes someone to lose faith in Jesus".

== Translation ==
=== Noun ===
As a noun, skandalon means either "temptations that cause people to sin", or "stumbling blocks that cause people to lose faith".

Thus, Matthew 18:7 is translated as either, "Woe to the world for temptations to sin!" or "How terrible for the world that there are things that make people lose their faith!"

=== Verb ===
The verb skandalizō (Strongs 4624) means 'to lead into sin', or 'to cause to fall away from faith.'

Matthew 18:6 is therefore translated as either, "to cause these little ones to sin," or, "to cause one of these little ones to lose faith in me."

=== Meaning of scandal and scandalise ===
Scandal is a "word or act which occasions another's spiritual ruin". Scandalising others is achieved by either enticing them into sin, or by causing them to lose faith.

Scandalising the innocent by the powerful is a mortal sin.

== Bible use ==
=== Hebrew Bible ===
The origin of the metaphor is the prohibition of putting a stumbling block before the blind (Leviticus 19:14). Geoffrey W. Bromiley calls the image "especially appropriate to a rocky land like Palestine". In the Hebrew Bible, the term for "stumbling block" is Biblical Hebrew miḵšōl (מִכְשׁוֹל). In the Septuagint, miḵšōl is translated into Koine Greek skandalon (σκανδαλον), a word which occurs only in Hellenistic literature, in the sense "snare for an enemy; cause of moral stumbling". In the Septuagint Psalms 140:9 a stumbling block means anything that leads to sin.

=== New Testament ===
A stumbling stone makes someone trip and fall. This figuratively means 'something that causes someone to lose faith in Jesus.' According to Strong's Greek Lexicon, this meaning is applied to Jesus, whose person was so contrary to the expectations of the Jews, that they rejected him and thereby lost their salvation. In other words, Jesus is like a stumbling stone because in rejecting him, people fall very heavily.

The New Testament usages of skandalon, such as Matthew 13:41, resemble Septuagint usage. It appears 15 times in the New Testament in 12 unique verses according to Strong's Concordance. These passages are: Matthew 13:41, Matthew 16:23 , Matthew 18:7 (3 times), Luke 17:1 , Romans 9:33, Romans 11:9, Romans 14:13, Romans 16:17, 1 Corinthians 1:23, Galatians 5:11, 1 Peter 2:8, 1 John 2:10, and Revelation 2:14.

The noun skandalon has a derived verb, skandalizo (formed with the -iz suffix as English "scandalize"), meaning literally "to trip somebody up" or, idiomatically, "to cause someone to sin." This verb appears 29 times in 27 New Testament verses.

Apart from skandalon the idiom of "stumbling block" has a second synonym in the Greek term proskomma "stumbling." Both words are used together in 1 Peter 2:8; this is a "stone of stumbling" (lithos proskommatos λίθος προσκόμματος) and a "rock of offense" (petra skandalou πέτρα σκανδάλου). The antonymous adjective aproskopos (ἀπρόσκοπος), "without causing anyone to stumble," also occurs three times in the New Testament.

== Later use ==
=== Judaism ===
The Leviticus warning is developed in rabbinical Judaism as lifnei iver "before the blind".

=== Christianity ===
==== Catholic writings ====
"Scandal" is discussed by Thomas Aquinas in the Summa Theologica. In the 1992 Catechism of the Catholic Church, it is discussed under the fifth commandment (Thou shalt not kill) section "Respect for the Dignity of Persons".

Actively scandalise is performed by a person; to be passively scandalised is the reaction of a person to active scandalisation ("scandal given" or in Latin scandalum datum), or to acts which, because of the viewer's ignorance, weakness, or malice, are regarded as scandalous ("scandal received" or in Latin scandalum acceptum).

In order to qualify as scandalous, the behavior must, in itself, be evil or give the appearance of evil. To do a good act or an indifferent act, even knowing that it will inspire others to sin — as when a student studies diligently to do well, knowing it will cause envy — is not scandalous. For example, to ask someone to commit perjury is scandalous, but for a judge to require witnesses to give an oath even when he knows the witness is likely to commit perjury is not scandalous. It does not require that the other person actually commit sin; to be scandalous, it suffices that the act is of a nature to lead someone to sin. Scandal is performed with the intention of inducing someone to sin. Urging someone to commit a sin is therefore active scandal. In the case where the person urging the sin is aware of its nature and the person he is urging is ignorant, the sins committed are the fault of the person who urged them. Scandal is also performed when someone performs an evil act, or an act that appears to be evil, knowing that it will lead others into sin. (In case of an apparently evil act, a sufficient reason for the act despite the faults it will cause negates the scandal.) Scandal may also be incurred when an innocent act may be an occasion of sin to the weak, but such acts should not be foregone if the goods at stake are of importance.

==== Protestant writings ====
The term "stumbling block" is common in Protestant writings. An early use was Martin Luther's consideration that the common belief that the Mass was a sacrifice was a "stumbling block."

=== Scandalised by the State ===
One can be scandalised by the State: They are guilty of scandal who establish laws or social structures leading to the decline of morals and the corruption of religious practice, or to "social conditions that, intentionally or not, make Christian conduct and obedience to the Commandments difficult and practically impossible."

== Modern "scandal" ==
The Greek word skandalon was borrowed from Greek to Latin to French, and finally to English as "scandal". The modern English meaning of scandal is a development from the religious meaning, via the intermediate sense of "damage to reputation".

== Ways to scandalise ==
There are nine ways to entice others to sin, persuading them that their sinful conduct is not sinful: 1) by advice; 2) by command; 3) by consent; 4) by enticement; 5) by flattery; 6) by concealing; 7) by participating; 8) by remaining silent; 9) by defending the ill done.
