= Sporer =

Sporer is a surname. Notable people with the name include:

- Erich Spörer (1911–1977), German sports shooter
- Gustav Spörer (1822–1895), German astronomer
- Juraj Šporer (1795–1884), Croatian physician and writer, forerunner of the Illyrian movement
- Patritius Sporer (died 1683), German Franciscan moral theologian

== See also ==
- Spörer Minimum, hypothesized 90-year span of low solar activity, from about 1460 until 1550
- Spörer (crater), lunar impact crater north of the crater Herschel and southeast of the lava-flooded Flammarion
