= Indifferent act =

Philosophical concept

An indifferent act is any action that is neither good nor evil.

When acts are considered in general, with respect only to their object, there are acts that can be said to be neither good nor bad, but indifferent. It is a topic of much dispute whether a specific act, performed by a specific person in particular circumstances, and for a certain end, can be indifferent, provided that it is not something done out of habit rather than deliberation.

== Catholic theologians on indifferent acts ==
Can the character of indifference be predicated of the act, considered not as an abstraction of the mind, but in the concrete, as it is exercised by the individual in particular circumstances, and for a certain end?

To this question St. Bonaventure, answers in the affirmative, and with him Duns Scotus, and all the Scotist school. So also Patritius Sporer; Benjamin Elbel; Vasquez; Arriaga; and later Archbishop Walsh. Thomas Aquinas, and his commentators hold the opposite opinion. So too do Francisco Suárez; Charles René Billuart; Alphonsus Liguori; Thomas Bouquillon; Augustine Lehmkuhl; and Hieronymus Noldin.

The Thomists, no less than the Scotists, recognize as morally indifferent acts done without deliberation, such, for instance, as the stroking of one's beard or the rubbing of one's hands together, as these ordinarily take place. Admittedly indifferent, too, will those acts be in which there is but a physical deliberation, as it is called, such as is realized when, for instance, we deliberately read or write, without any thought of the moral order. The question here is of those acts only that are performed with advertence to a moral rule. Again, most of the Thomists will allow that an act would be indifferent in the case where an agent would judge it to be neither good nor bad after he had formed his conscience, according to the opinion of Scotists. Finally, no controversy is raised regarding the indifference of acts with reference to supernatural merit. The doctrine that all the works of infidels are evil has been formally condemned. Yet clearly, while the deeds of those without grace may be morally good, and thus in the supernatural order escape all demerit, they cannot, at the same time, lay claim to any merit.

Both the Thomists and Scotists will declare that, to be morally good, an act must be in conformity with the exigencies and dignity of our rational nature. But the question is, what is to be reckoned as conformable to the exigencies and dignity of our rational nature? According to the Scotists, the deliberate act of a rational being, to be morally good, must be referred to a positively good end. Hence those acts in which the agent adverts to no end, and which have for their object nothing that is either conformable to our rational nature, nor yet contrary to it, such as eating, drinking, taking recreation, and the like, cannot be accounted morally good. Since, however, these discover no deviation from the moral norm, they cannot be characterized as evil, and so therefore, it is said, must be considered as indifferent.

According to the opinion of Thomas Aquinas, a common one among theologians, it is not necessary, in order to be morally good, that an act should be referred to a positively good end. It is enough that the end is seen to be not evil, and that in the performance of the act the bounds set by right reason be not transgressed. Thus the acts of eating, drinking, taking recreation, and the like, while, in the abstract, they are neither conformable nor contrary to our rational nature, in the concrete, by reason of the circumstance of their being done in the manner and the measure prescribed by reason, become fully in accord with our rational nature, and hence morally good. It will be observed from the foregoing that the Thomists hold as morally good the acts which the Scotists maintain to be only morally indifferent.

According to a third class of theologians, a deliberate act which is not referred to a positively good end must be reputed as morally evil. Hence that which we have described as good in the doctrine of Thomas Aquinas, and as indifferent to the mind of Duns Scotus, must according to these theologians, be deemed nothing else than bad. The advocates of this opinion are one with Aquinas only in declaring that there are no indifferent deliberate acts. They differ from him radically in their rigour.

== Notes ==
Attribution
