= Patritius Sporer =

German Franciscan moral theologian

Patritius Sporer (died 29 May 1683) was a German Franciscan moral theologian.

Sporer was born and died at Passau, in the Electorate of Bavaria. In 1637 he entered the Order of Friars Minor in the convent of his native town, which then belonged to the religious Province of Strasburg. He taught theology for many years, obtained the title of Lector jubilatus, and was also the theologian of the Bishop of Passau.

== Works ==
Sporer is the author of several works:

- Amor Dei super omnia (Würzburg, 1662);
- Actionum humanarum immediata regula Conscientia moraliter explicata atque ad disputationem publicam exposita (Würzburg, 1660);
- Theologia moralis, decalogalis et sacramentalis (3 folio vols., 1681; re-edited, Salzburg, 1692; Venice, 1724, 1726, 1755, 1756).

Some editions have additional notes by Kilian Kazenberger and Ch. Mayr, two Franciscan moralists. An edition with supplements was produced by Irenäus Bierbaum (3 vols. 8vo, Paderborn, 1897–1901; 2nd ed., 1901-5).

Alphonsus Liguori often quotes him and August Lehmkuhl numbers him amongst the classical authors of moral theology.

For his moral system he follows Probabilism. In questions at issue between Thomas Aquinas and Duns Scotus he defends and follows the latter, as for instance in the question of indifferent human actions. Very often Sporer draws on his own experience as spiritual director.
