= Ferramonti di Tarsia =

Ferramonti di Tarsia (Ferramonti)
- Italian fascist concentration camp
- Location of Ferramonti in Italy
- Coordinates: 39°35′00″N 16°14′39″E
- Location: Tarsia, Italy
- Operated by: the Italian Blackshirts (MVSN), the Allied Military Government (after the liberation in 1943)
- Operational: June 1940 – September 1943
- Inmates: mainly Jews
- Website: www.museoferramonti.it / www.fondazioneferramonti.it

Ferramonti di Tarsia, also known as Ferramonti, was an Italian internment camp used to intern political dissidents and ethnic minorities. It was located in the municipality of Tarsia, near Cosenza, in Calabria. It was the largest of the fifteen internment camps established by Benito Mussolini between June and September 1940. Over 3,800 Jews were imprisoned at the camp.

== Location ==
The camp was located in Ferramonti, a rural locality 6 km in south of Tarsia, by the river Crati. The area where it was located is now next to the current exit "Tarsia Sud" of the A2 motorway.

== History ==
The construction of Ferramonti began on June 4, 1940, by the Parrini Construction company less than a week before Italy entered World War II.

The arrest of Jewish citizens began on June 15, and prisoners began arriving at the camp on June 20. Between June, 1940, and August, 1943, there were 3,823 Jewish internees at Ferramonti, of which only 141 were Italian. The majority, 3,682 people, were foreign-born. Two large contingents of Jews escaping Nazi Europe arrived from Benghazi in September 1940 and from the paddle-steamer ship Pentcho which arrived in Ferramonti via Rhodes, in February 1942 having set sail from Bratislava in May 1940.

Prisoners organized a nursery, library, school, theater and synagogue. Several couples got married at the camp and 21 children were born. Rabbi Riccardo Pacifici was the spiritual advisor to the Jewish inmates from 1942 to 1943 although he was himself eventually removed and killed in Auschwitz. For the Christian internees the spiritual advisor was Padre Callisto Lopinot. Unlike the Nazi concentration camps, the Italian camps were neither death camps nor slave labor camps. However, the detainees were kept behind barbed wire and guarded by the Italian militia, though they enjoyed a certain autonomy within these confines. In some cases, internees were invited to the local town of Tarsia where there was a need for skills that were abundant in the camp which comprised among others, doctors, carpenters, engineers, dentists, lawyers, musicians, artists. Apart from a friendly fire incident in August 1943 which killed four internees, and two deaths from an explosion outside the camp in December 1943, the only other deaths were from natural causes and most survived their imprisonment unharmed.

Six weeks after Mussolini's downfall (September, 1943), the camp was liberated by the Allies, British 8th Army, who had reached Calabria from Sicily thus making Ferramonti the first Italian camp to be liberated. Although many internees chose to remain in relative safety of the camp until its closure in December 1945, others fled north only to encounter Germans in the occupied northern Italy. Many other internees joined the Allied armed forces. Some of the 1,000 refugees who were shipped to the United States and interned at Camp Oswego, New York came from this camp. Ultimately, they were released and were permitted to stay in the United States.

== See also ==
- List of Italian concentration camps
- Campagna internment camp

== Sources ==
- Walston, James. "History and Memory of the Italian Concentration Camps", The Historical Journal, Vol. 40, No. 1 (Mar. 1997), Cambridge University Press, pp. 169–183, 15 pp.
- Rende, Mario. Ferramonti di Tarsia, 2009, Mursia Editore, Italy
