= Riccardo Pacifici =

Italian rabbi (1904–1943)

- Born: 18 February 1904; Florence, Italy
- Died: 12 December 1943 (aged 39); Auschwitz-Birkenau, German-occupied Poland
- Occupations: Rabbi, essayist, teacher
- Spouse: Wanda Abenaim
- Writing career
- Genres: religious, historical, Judaism

Riccardo Reuven Pacifici (18 February 1904 — 12 December 1943 ) was an Italian rabbi from a Jewish family of ancient Sephardic origins, with roots in the Jewish Spanish and rabbinical traditions. Together with his wife, he was murdered in Auschwitz.

== Life ==
Son of Mario Mordechai Pacifici and Gilda Borghi, Pacifici descended from an ancient Sephardic and religious Jewish family of Spanish origin and of rabbinical tradition settled in Tuscany (first in Leghorn, then in Florence) in the 16th century. After the "Liceo Classico" (Classical Studies High School) he attended the University of Florence, where he graduated summa cum laude in Classics (Lettere Classiche) in 1926, and in 1927 he was awarded by the Rabbinical College of Florence—where he had studied under important scholars such as Elia Samuele Artom, Umberto Cassuto, Shemuel Zvi Margulies—the title of Hakham ha shalem (Senior Rabbi).

Pacifici served as Vicerabbi of Venice from 1928 to 1930, director of the Rabbinical College of Rhodes from 1930, Great Rabbi of Rhodes until 1936, Chief Rabbi of the Genoa Jewish Community (Comunità Israelitica di Genova) from 1936 until deported by the Nazis in 1943.

Even during the difficult war years, Pacifici never stopped his spiritual and teaching activity. He continued his rabbinical duties between 1942 and 1943 with the Jewish refugees of the Ferramonti di Tarsia internment camp, located in Cosenza in the region of Calabria.

Unwilling to leave his Genoa Community and thus abandon his remaining members, Rav Pacifici was captured by deceit in 1943 by the Nazis and sent to Auschwitz, where he was murdered with his wife Wanda Abenaim and many other members of the Pacifici family.

The "Largo Riccardo Pacifici" square, in Genoa was named after him in 1966. He was the grandfather of the past Rome Jewish Community President Riccardo Pacifici.

== Bibliography ==
- Le iscrizioni dell'antico cimitero ebraico a Venezia (Inscriptions of the Ancient Jewish Cemetery in Venice), Tipografia Enrico Ariani, Florence, 1935;
- Il nuovo Tempio di Genova con illustrazioni e notizie storiche sulla Comunità nei secoli XVII-XVIII (The New Temple of Genoa with Illustrations and Historical Notes on the Community in the 17th and 18th Centuries), Tipografia Marsano, Genoa, 1939;
- Fatti e personaggi biblici alla luce del pensiero tradizionale ebraico. Antologia di Midrashim scelti e tradotti da Riccardo Pacifici (A Midrash Anthology, translated by Riccardo Pacifici), Grafotecnica, Genoa, 1943;
- Discorsi sulla Torà (Discourses on the Torah), Rome, 5728-1968, edited by Emanuele Pacifici it:Emanuele Pacifici (available online as a free e-book on torah.it);
- Fatti e personaggi biblici nell'interpretazione ebraica tradizionale (Biblical Facts and Figures in Traditional Jewish Interpretation), Marietti, Genoa, 1986, ed. by Emanuele Pacifici.
