= Johann Nobis =

Austrian conscientious objector

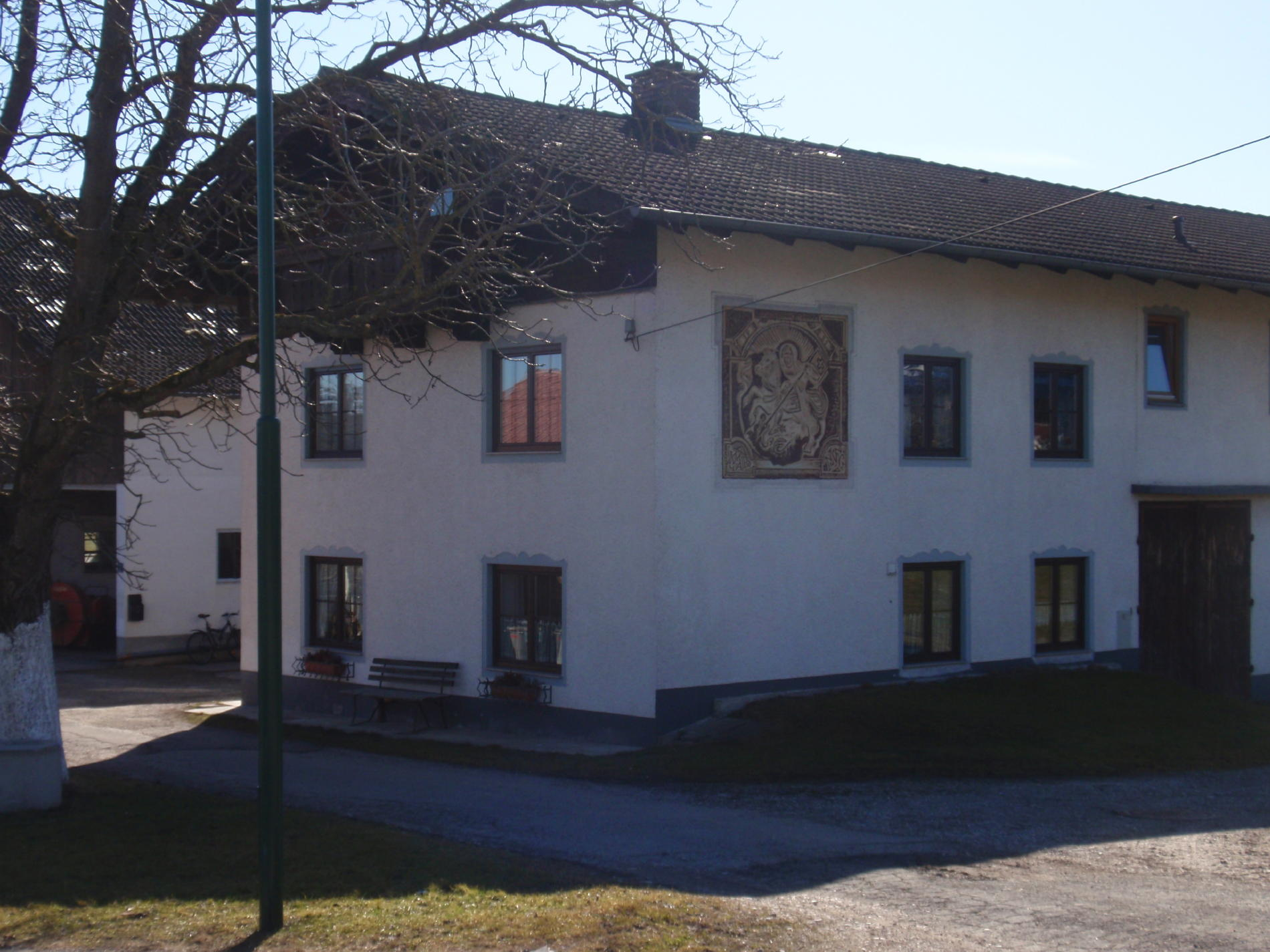
Birthplace of Johann Nobis

Johann Nobis (born 16 April 1899, St. Georgen bei Salzburg, Austria; died 6 January 1940, Plötzensee Prison, Berlin, Germany) was an Austrian conscientious objector.

== Life ==
Johann Nobis was born to a farmer in the Holzhausen municipality St. Georgen bei Salzburg. As a Jehovah's Witness, he refused to take the oath of allegiance to Adolf Hitler. He was arrested, and on 23 November 1939 was sentenced to death by a Reich's court-martial, for diminishing the state's defensive power.

He was imprisoned at Plötzensee Prison on 20 December 1939, where he was executed on 6 January 1940. On the day of his execution, five other Jehovah's Witnesses from Salzburg were also executed.

His farewell letter to his mother is archived at the DÖW, donated by Gertrud Feichtinger-Nobis.

== Stolpersteine ==
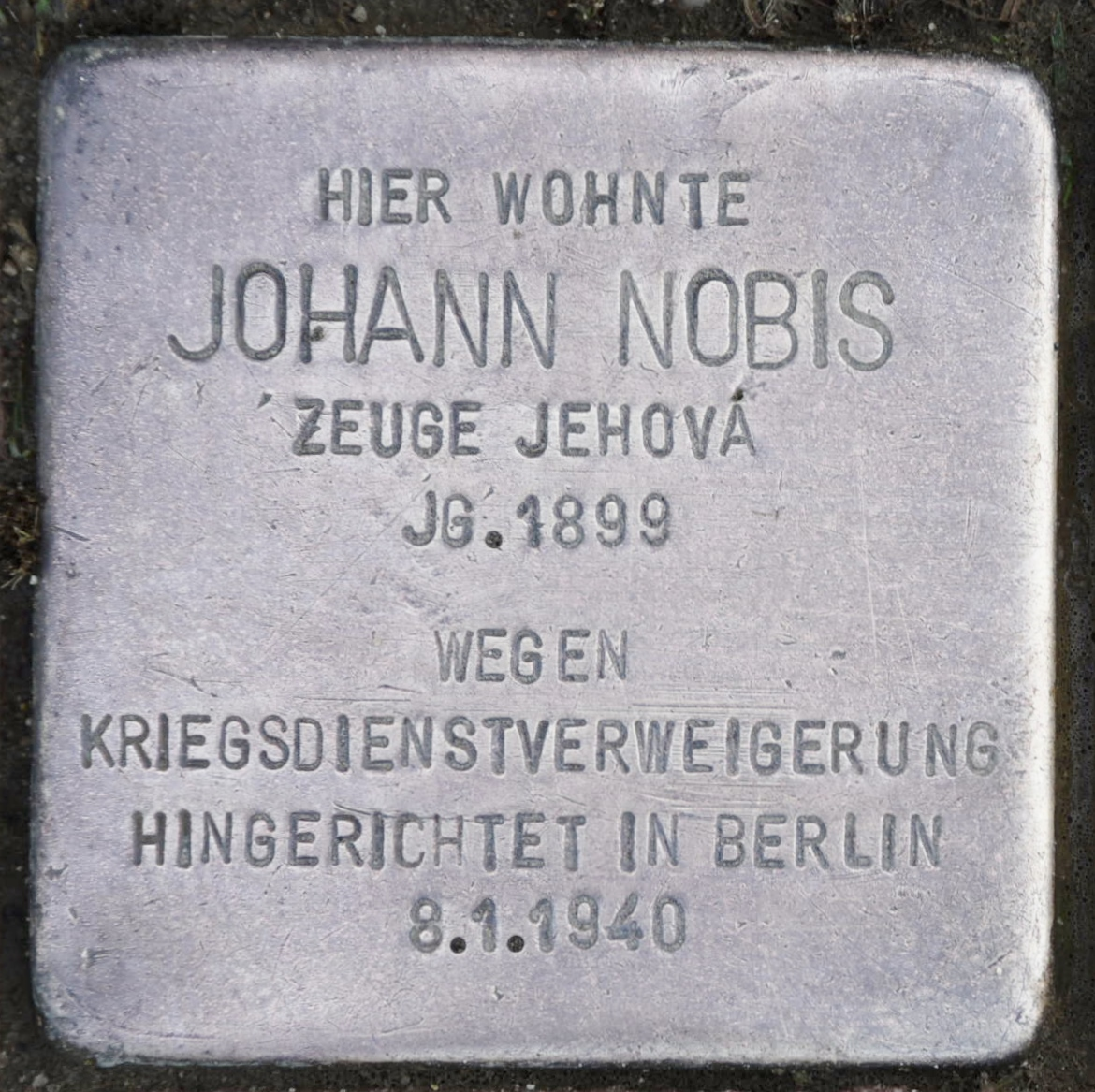
Stolperstein for Johann Nobis

On 19 July 1997 the artist Gunter Demnig installed two stolpersteine for Johann Nobis and his brother Matthias Nobis in front of their birth house in Sankt Georgen bei Salzburg, at the invitation of Andreas Maislinger. Gunter Demnig was a guest of the Arts Initiative KNIE in Oberndorf bei Salzburg. He has installed over 20,000 stolpersteine for victims of the National Socialist regime. In nearby Sankt Radegund a Stolperstein for the beatified Franz Jägerstätter was set up in 2006.
