= Knie =

Knie is a German language surname. It is a nickname for a person with a protruding knee – and may refer to:

- Roberta Knie (1938–2017), American dramatic soprano
- Rolf Knie (1949), Swiss painter and actor

== See also ==
- Circus Knie, now run by Frédy and Franco Knie
- Arts Initiative KNIE, an initiative for contemporary art in Austria
- Ernst-Reuter-Platz, new name of Am Knie in Berlin
