= Stolperstein of London =

Brass plate memorial in London

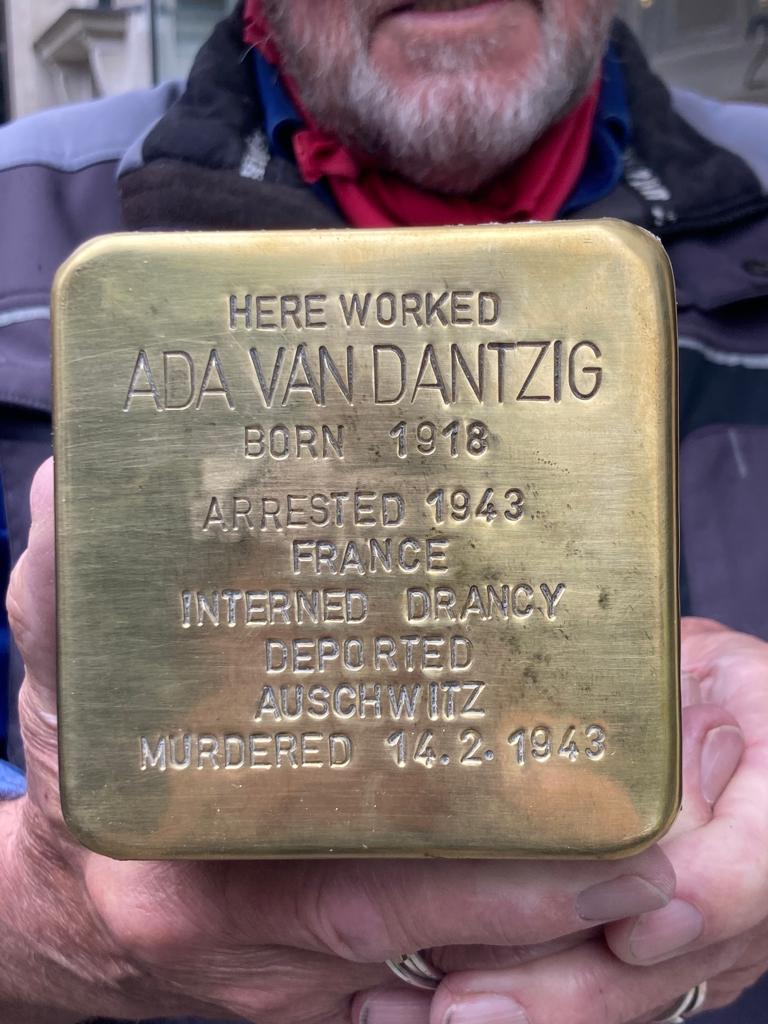
Gunter Demnig presents London's first Stolperstein

The first Stolperstein of London is dedicated to Ada van Dantzig, a Dutch restorer of paintings. Stolpersteine (German for 'stumbling blocks') are created by the German artist Gunter Demnig. They commemorate the fate of people who were murdered, deported, expelled or driven to suicide by the German Nazis. Stolpersteine can be found in thirty European countries. They are usually located in front of the victim's last self-chosen place of residence.

The first Stolperstein in London was laid by the artist himself on 30 May 2022. It was the first one in the United Kingdom.

== Stolperstein ==
Stolperstein	Inscription	Address	Name, life
	HERE WORKED; ADA VAN DANTZIG; BORN 1918; ARRESTED 1943; FRANCE; INTERNED DRANCY; DEPORTED; AUSCHWITZ; MURDERED 14 February 1943	2 & 3 Golden Square; 51.512044°N 0.136943°W	Ada van Dantzig, called Anna, was born on 3 August 1918, in Rotterdam. Her parents were the banker David van Dantzig and Wilhelmina Jacoba van Dantzig-Catz. She had three siblings: Paul Hermann (born 1921), Jenny Louise (born 1924) and Hugo Michel. Van Dantzig became a restorer of paintings. From 1934 she worked in a private studio in London. After the outbreak of World War II in 1939 van Dantzig returned to her family in Rotterdam – ignoring the advice and requests of friends and colleagues. In May 1940, the Netherlands were overrun by German troops. The family fled to France, but was betrayed there and arrested because they were Jewish. Ada van Dantzig, her sister, her brother Paul and her parents were brought to the Drancy internment camp. From there, all four family members were deported to the Auschwitz concentration camp. The deportation train no. 47 left Drancy on 11 February 1943; it arrived at the Auschwitz gas chambers on 14 February 1943. Ada van Dantzig, her mother and her sister were murdered there immediately upon arrival. Paul van Dantzig was murdered by the Nazis in March 1943, David van Dantzig in October 1943. The only survivor of the whole family was Ada's brother Hugo. He too was captured by the Nazis, but he had acquired a false identity as a South African soldier. He was interned as a prisoner of war in a German camp and was liberated by the Allied forces in 1945. He died in 2009.

== Placement ==
The Stolperstein for Ada van Dantzig was placed by the artist himself. It was financed through fundraising.
