= Stolpersteine in Prague-Vršovice and Modřany =

Memorial installations in Czech Republic

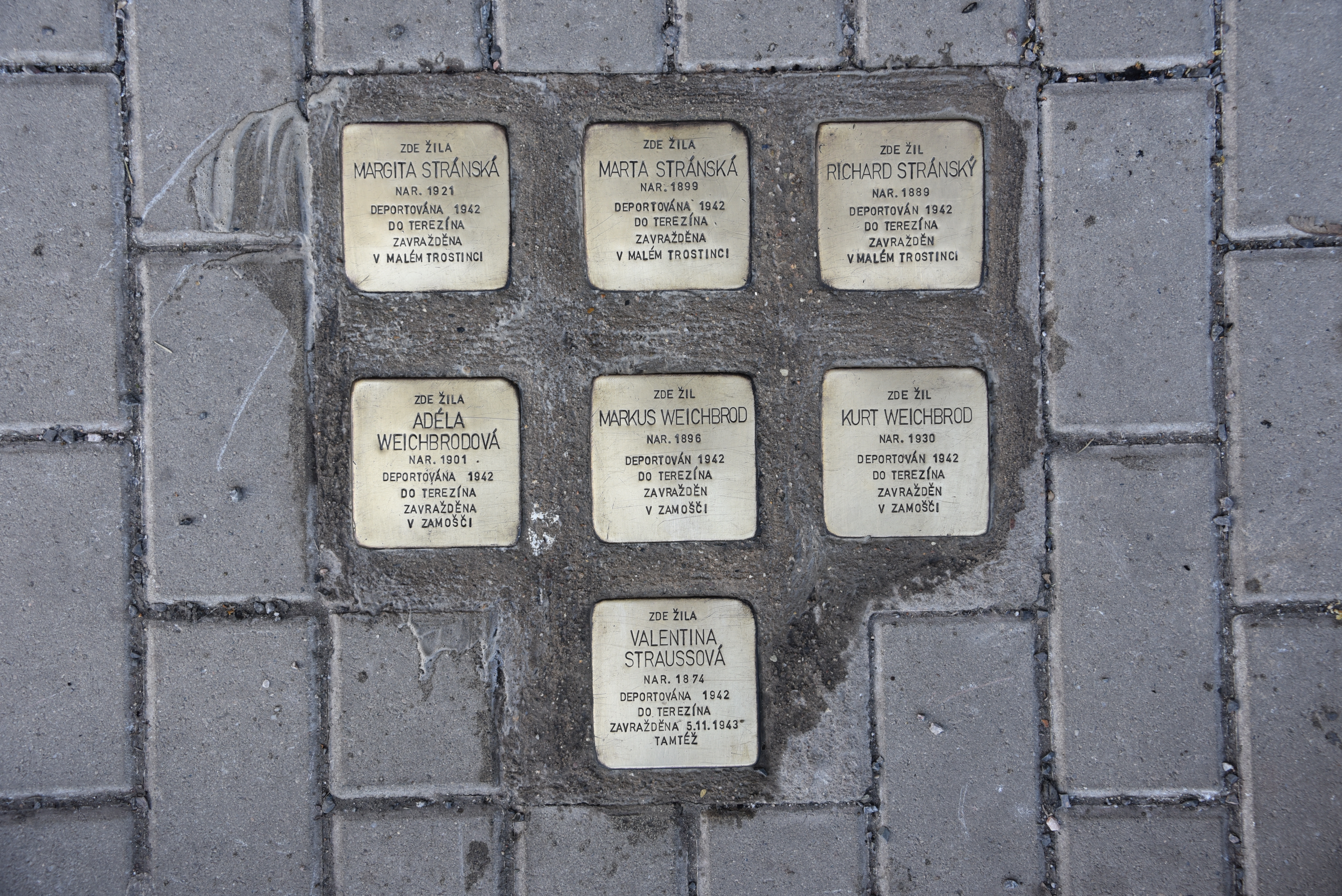
Stolpersteine for the families Stránska, Strauss and Weichbrod in front of Petrohradská 155/27, Vršovice

This article lists the Stolpersteine in the town quarters Vršovice (Praha 10) and Modřany (Praha 12). Stolpersteine is the German name for stumbling blocks collocated all over Europe by German artist Gunter Demnig. They remember the fate of the Nazi victims being murdered, deported, exiled or driven to suicide.

Generally, the stumbling blocks are posed in front of the building where the victims had their last self chosen residence. The name of the Stolpersteine in Czech is: Kameny zmizelých.

== Praha 10: Vršovice ==
Stone	Name	Location	Life and death
	Margita Stránská	Petrohradská 155/27; 50°03′59″N 14°27′07″E	Margita Stránská was born in Rumburg on 2 April 1921. Her first name was also spelled Margareta. She was the daughter of Richard Stránský and Marta née Strauss. Prior to Nazi destruction of Czechoslovakia she lived in Rumburg, later on in Mladá Vožice. On 4 September 1942 she was deported from Prague to Theresienstadt concentration camp with transport Bd, together with her mother and her father. On 8 September 1942 she was deported to Maly Trostenets extermination camp with transport Bk, train Da 226, again with her parents. All three killed were during the Shoah. Her grand mother Valentina Straussová was murdered in November 1943 in Theresienstadt. There are two reports on Margita Stránská in Yad Vashem. One is based on the Theresienstädter Gedenkbuch, the other one was filed by Herta Fridman, her aunt.
	Marta Stránská née Strauss	Petrohradská 155/27; 50°03′59″N 14°27′07″E	Marta Stránská née Strauss was born in Chřibská on 20 March 1899. She was the daughter of Gottlieb Strauss and Valentina née Weisskopf. She was a housewife and married to Richard Stránský. The couple had a daughter called Margita. Prior to Nazi destruction of Czechoslovakia she lived in Mladá Vožice. On 4 September 1942 she was deported from Prague to Theresienstadt concentration camp with transport Bd, together with her husband and her daughter. On 8 September 1942 the family was deported to Maly Trostenets extermination camp with transport Bk, train Da 226, and all three were killed there. Her mother was murdered in November 1943 in Theresienstadt. There are two reports on Marta Stránská in Yad Vashem. One is based on the Theresienstädter Gedenkbuch, the other one was filed by Yohan Hanus Grab, a family member who as a child lived in Plzeň during the Nazi occupation.
	Richard Stránský	Petrohradská 155/27; 50°03′59″N 14°27′07″E	Richard Stránský was born in Mladá Boleslav in 1889. His first name sometimes is also spelled Rickard. He became a merchant and married Marta née Straussová. The couple had a daughter called Margita. On 4 September 1942 he was deported from Prague to Theresienstadt concentration camp with transport Bd, together with his wife and his daughter. On 8 September 1942 the family was deported to Maly Trostenets extermination camp with transport Bk, train Da 226, and all three were killed during the Shoah. There are two reports on Richard Stránský in Yad Vashem. One is based on the Theresienstädter Gedenkbuch, the other one was filed by Herta Fridman, his surviving sister-in-law.
	Valentina Straussová	Petrohradská 155/27; 50°03′59″N 14°27′07″E	Valentina Straussová née Weisskopf was born in Morchenstern in 1874. She was the daughter of Yitzkhak Weisskopf and Matilda. She was a housewife and married to Gottlieb Strauss. The couple had at least three daughters, Herta, Adéla and Marta. On 16 November 1942 she was deported from Tabor to Theresienstadt concentration camp with transport Cb. She lost her life there on 5 November 1943. Her daughters Adéla and Marta, their husbands Markus and Richard as well as her grand children Kurt and Margita were also murdered by the Nazi regime. There are two reports on Valentina Straussová in Yad Vashem. One is based on the Theresienstädter Gedenkbuch, the other one was filed by her daughter Herta Fridman. Altogether, Herta Fridman submitted 39 reports on murdered family members to Yad Vashem.
	Rudolf Vogl	Slovinská 1041/6; 50°04′13″N 14°27′07″E	Rudolf Vogl was born on 1 October 1907 in Radějovice u Netonic. His parents were Emanuel Vogl and Regina née Fuchsová. He had at least two sisters, Anna and Kamila. The family moved to Prague before 1910. His younger sister was already born there. Rudolf Vogl as an employee and a worker. In 1939, his emigration to Cuba was granted but did not take place. In November 1940, he requested the permit to emigrate to Shanghai. Finally he received the permit one year later, but again could not realize his plans. On 30 January 1942 he was deported with transport V from Prague to Theresienstadt concentration camp, together with his sister Kamila. His transport number was 1000. On 13 June 1942 he was deported with transport AAi to Sobibór extermination camp, again together with his sister Kamila. His transport number was 168. Both Rudolf Vogl and his sister were murdered by the Nazi regime. His parents had already died in 1940 or earlier. His elder sister Anna Voglová was also killed during the Shoah.
	Anna Voglová	Slovinská 760/17; 50°04′13″N 14°27′31″E	Anna Voglová was born on 1 May 1899 in Radějovice u Netonic. Her parents were Emanuel Vogl and Regina née Fuchsová. She had at least two siblings, brother Rudolf and sister Kamila. The family moved to Prague before 1910. Her sister was already born there. Anna Voglová was deported with transport AAh from Prague to Ujazdow on 10 June 1942. Her transport number was 324 of 1000. Only three Jews of this transport could survive the Shoah. Anna Voglová was amongst the 997 murdered by the Nazi regime. According to a document issued for her brother Rudolf, the parents of Anna Voglová were already dead in 1940. Her brother and her sister were both deported half a year before her own deportation. None survived the Shoah.
	Kamila Voglová	Slovinská 1041/6; 50°04′13″N 14°27′07″E	Kamila Voglová was born on 3 February 1910 in Prague. Her parents were Emanuel Vogl and Regina née Fuchsová. He had at least two siblings, sister Anna and brother Rudolf. The family moved to Prague somewhere between 1907 and 1910. She worked as a lady's dressmaker. On 30 January 1942 she was deported with transport V from Prague to Theresienstadt concentration camp, together with her brother Rudolf. Her transport number was 144. On 13 June 1942 he was deported with transport AAi to Sobibór extermination camp, again together with his sister Kamila. Her transport number was 507. Both brother and sister were murdered by the Nazi regime. Her parents had already died in 1940 or earlier. Her elder sister Anna Voglová was also killed during the Shoah.
	Kurt Weichbrod	Petrohradská 155/27; 50°03′59″N 14°27′07″E	Kurt Weichbrod was born on 12 August 1930. His grand mother was Valenina Straussová, his parents were Markus Weichbrod and Adela née Straussová. On 24 April 1942 he and his parents were deported with transport Am from Prague to Theresienstadt concentration camp. His transport number was 123. Four days later, on 28 April 1942, he and his parents were deported with transport Ar to Zamošč. His transport number was 744. The eleven-year-old boy and his parents did not survive the Shoah.
	Markus Weichbrod	Petrohradská 155/27; 50°03′59″N 14°27′07″E	Markus Mechel Weichbrod was born on 24 December 1896. He married Adela née Straussová. The couple had one son, Kurt, born in 1930. On 24 April 1942 he, his wife and his son were deported with transport Am from Prague to Theresienstadt concentration camp. His transport number was 121. Four days later, on 28 April 1942, the family was deported with transport Ar to Zamošč. His transport number was 742. Markus Weichbrod, his wife and his son were murdered in the course of the Shoah.
	Adéla Weichbrodová	Petrohradská 155/27; 50°03′59″N 14°27′07″E	Adéla Weichbrodová née Straussová was born on 21 Juni 1901 in Chřibská. Her parents were Gottlieb Strauss and Valentina née Weisskopf. She married Markus Mechel Weichbrod and was a housewife. The couple had one son, Kurt, born in 1930. On 24 April 1942 she, her husband and her son were deported with transport Am from Prague to Theresienstadt concentration camp. Her transport number was 122. Four days later, on 28 April 1942, the family was deported with transport Ar to Zamošč. Her transport number was 743.Adéla Weichbrodová, her husband and her son were murdered in the course of the Shoah.

== Praha 12: Modřany ==
Stone	Name	Location	Life and death
	Valerie Freundová née Stern	Dostojevského 931/5; 49°59′51″N 14°24′41″E	Valerie Freundová née Stern was born on 13 October 1902. She was the daughter of Hugo Stern, also Jizchak or Jehuda, and Marie, also Mirjam. She married Walter Freund. The couple had at least one daughter named Zuzinka, born in 1933. Both mother and daughter were deported with transport Ck from Prague to Theresienstadt concentration camp on 22 December 1942. Her transport number was 931 of 1005. On 4 October 1944 both were deported with transport En to Auschwitz concentration camp. Her transport number was 259 of 1500. Both mother and daughter were murdered by the Nazi regime in Auschwitz. The report to Yad Vashem was submitted by her niece Dina Kühne-Stern in 1998. The niece then lived in Switzerland.
	Zuzinka Freundová	Dostojevského 931/5; 49°59′51″N 14°24′41″E	Zuzinka Freundová, also known as Zuzana, was born on 27 April 1933. She was the daughter of Walter Freund and Valerie née Stern. Together with her mother she was deported on 22 December 1942 with transport Ck to Theresienstadt concentration camp. Her transport number was 932 of 1005. On 4 October 1944 she was deported with transport En to Auschwitz concentration camp. Her transport number was 260 of 1500. The eleven-year-old girl and her mother were both murdered in Auschwitz.

== Dates of collocations ==
According to the website of Gunter Demnig the Stolpersteine of Prague were posed on 8 October 2008, 7 November 2009, 12 June 2010, 13 to 15 June 2011 and on 17 July 2013 by the artist himself. Another collocation, not credited on Demnig's website, took place on 28 October 2012.

The Czech Stolperstein project was initiated in 2008 by the Česká unie židovské mládeže (Czech Union of Jewish Youth) and was realized with the patronage of the Mayor of Prague.

== See also ==
- List of places with Stolpersteine
- Stolpersteine in the Czech Republic
