= Stolpersteine in Hradec Králové Region =

Memorial installation in Czech Republic

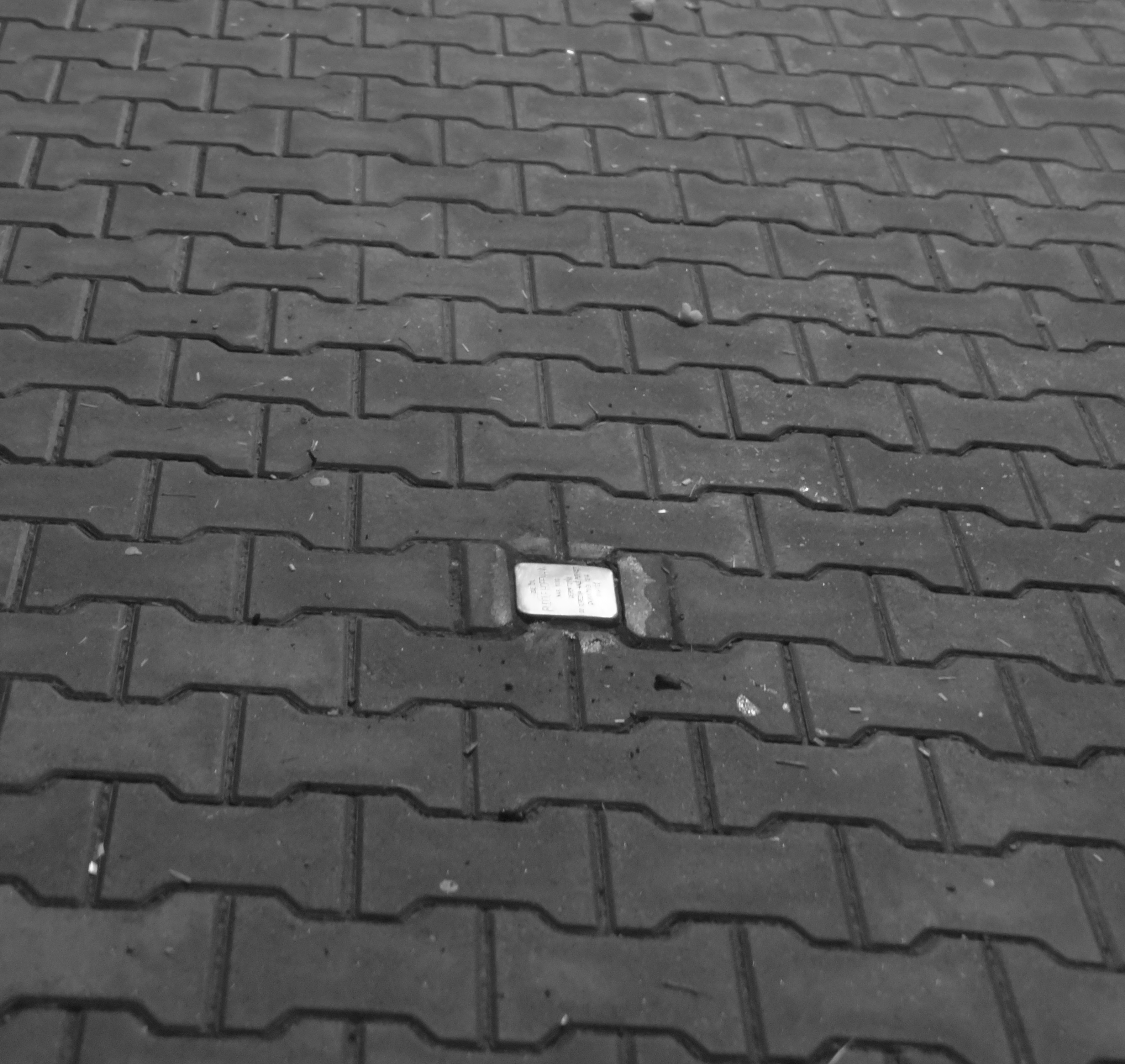
Stolperstein in Kostelec nad Orlici

This article lists the Stolpersteine in the region Královéhradecký kraj in the north-east of Bohemia. Stolpersteine is the German name for stumbling blocks collocated all over Europe by German artist Gunter Demnig. They remember the fate of the Nazi victims being murdered, deported, exiled or driven to suicide.

Generally, the stumbling blocks are posed in front of the building where the victims had their last self chosen residence. The name of the Stolpersteine in Czech is: Kameny zmizelých, stones of the disappeared.

== Kostelec nad Orlicí ==
Stone	Inscription	Location	Life and death
	HERE LIVED; RUDOLF HOFFMANN; BORN 1880; DEPORTED; TO THERESIENSTADT-SMALL FORTRESS; MURDERED 1944; IBIDEM	Komenského 465; 50°07′27″N 16°12′29″E	Rudolf Hoffmann was born on 17 February 1880 in Pardubice. He was a factory foreman and resided in Kostelec nad Orlicí 465. He was married with Marie, born on 8 April 1896. He was deported to Theresienstadt concentration camp and murdered there in 1944.

== Náchod ==
The history of the family Goldschmid in Náchod dates back to 1636, when Moses Jacob Goldschmid was born there. In 1846 Samuel Golschmid founded a textile plant. The company was thereafter led by his son Max Michael Goldschmid (1847 in Náchod — 1911 in Náchod) and subsequently by his grandson Hanuš Goldschmid (1891 in Náchod — 1966 in São Paulo, Brazil). In 1930s the factory had 150 looms and about 300 employees. Today, the building does not exist any longer. Hanuš Goldschmid had five sisters, all born in Náchod, all murdered by the Nazi regime in concentration camps.

Stone	Inscription	Location	Life and death
	HERE LIVED; LILLY HAASOVÁ; NÉE GOLDSCHMIDOVÁ; BORN 1884; DEPORTED 1942; TO THERESIENSTADT; MURDERED 8.3.1944; IN AUSCHWITZ	Masarykovo nam. 57; 50°24′57″N 16°09′45″E	Lilly Haasová née Goldschmidová was born in 1884. Her husband, Rudolf Haas, came from Mladá Boleslav but lived in Prague. After she became a widow, Lilly returned to Nachod, where she lived first with her brother Hanuš, in her parents' house, and later-on, when Jews were not allowed any longer to stay in the square, she moved to the house of the Schura family in Tyršova street with her sister Jenny. Both sisters were deported to Theresienstadt concentration camp in December 1942. The following year, in September 1943, Lilly was included in a transport to Auschwitz concentration camp, where she was placed at the so-called 'Family camp'. She was murdered in a gas chamber on 8 March 1944. Her son Max, born in 1912, was deported in 1941 from Prague to Łódź Ghetto in Poland. He survived the Shoah, was liberated in Mühldorf, but after the war ended his own life.
	HERE LIVED; LOTTE KRAUSOVÁ; NÉE GOLDSCHMIDOVÁ; BORN 1898; DEPORTED 1942; TO THERESIENSTADT; MURDERED 8.1.1945; STUTTHOF	Masarykovo nam. 57; 50°24′57″N 16°09′45″E	Lotte Krausová née Goldschmidová, also Lola, was born in 1898. She was the youngest daughter of Max Michael Goldschmid, twenty years younger than her oldest sister Jenny. He stayed in a house on the square until 1928 and then married Karl Kraus, a physician The couple had a son, Míša, born in 1930. The family was deported on 14 November 1942 from Hradec Králové to Theresienstadt concentration camp where they spent one year. In December 1943, they were transported to Auschwitz concentration camp and placed at the so-called Family camp. Her husband was killed in a gas chamber, Lotte Krausová was deported to Stutthof concentration camp near Gdansk. Debilitated by forced labour and disease she died on 8 January 1945. Her son Míša, also called Michael, survived the Shoah, returned to Náchod as an orphan, emigrated later-on and described in a diary, which he wrote after the war, his concentration camp experiences.
	HERE LIVED; JENNY SCHUROVÁ; NÉE GOLDSCHMIDOVÁ; BORN 1878; DEPORTED 1942; TO THERESIENSTADT; MURDERED 8.3.1944; IN AUSCHWITZ	Masarykovo nam. 57; 50°24′57″N 16°09′45″E	Jenny Schurová née Goldschmidová, born in 1878, was the oldest daughter of Max Michael Goldschmid. In 1900 she married widower Gustav Schura, a partner of Izák Schur & sons, another textile company. Her husband was also a representative of the Jewish community in Náchod until his death in 1935. Schur's family lived in a large house in Tyršova street 200. Their older son Franz, born in 1901 in Náchod, became the owner of the factory in Hlinsko. He could emigrate, but not his wife and the two small children, who were murdered in Auschwitz. Their second son Bedřich, born on 6 July 1906 in Náchod, worked in the Goldschmid factory. In 1939, he, his wife Edita Heller, born on 7 December 1914 in Náchod, and their son Peter, born on 6 December 1938 in Úpice, could save their lives by emigrating to Constantinople. Later-on they settled in Brazil. In December 1942, Jenny Schurová was deported to Theresienstadt concentration camp, at the age of 64. There she spent a year before being deported to Auschwitz concentration camp in December 1943. During the night of 7 to 8 March 1944 she was murdered in a gas chamber. Her grandson Peter Schur and his wife Helene attended the collocation of the Stolperstein for Jenny Schurová.
	HERE LIVED; ALICE; SCHWABACHEROVÁ; NÉE GOLDSCHMIDOVÁ; BORN 1881; DEPORTED 1942; TO THERESIENSTADT; MURDERED 8.3.1944; IN AUSCHWITZ	Masarykovo nam. 57; 50°24′57″N 16°09′45″E	Alice Schwabacherová née Goldschmidová was born in 1881. She was the second daughter of Max Michael Goldschmid. After her marriage she moved to Prague. In April 1942 she and her husband were deported to Theresienstadt concentration camp where her husband was killed. In September 1943 she was deported to Auschwitz concentration camp. During the night of 7 to 8 March 1944 she was murdered in a gas chamber.
	HERE LIVED; MARIANA; STEINEROVÁ; NÉE GOLDSCHMIDOVÁ; BORN 1886; DEPORTED 1942; TO THERESIENSTADT; MURDERED 8.3.1944; IN AUSCHWITZ	Masarykovo nam. 57; 50°24′57″N 16°09′45″E	Mariana Steinerová née Goldschmidová, also called Mizzi or Mitzi, was born in 1886. She was the fourth daughter of Max Michael Goldschmid. She spent her childhood and youth in Náchod. After her marriage with Arthur or Artur Steiner she moved to Pardubice. From there she was deported to Theresienstadt concentration camp in December 1942 and after a year sent to Auschwitz concentration camp. There she was murdered in a gas chamber, just like her sisters Jenny, Alice and Lily. Her daughter Liselotte, later-on married and named Horáčková, was also imprisoned in Theresienstadt, but could survive. Mariana Steinerová's great grandson Tomáš Horáček attended the collocation of the Stolperstein for Mariana Steinerová.

Persons with relevance to the collocations in Nachod

- Michael Kraus, born in 1930 in Náchod, was the main initiator of the Stolperstein collocations for the five sisters. He was the son of physician Karl Kraus and Lola Goldschmidová who was murdered in Stutthof. Due to his age and his state of health he could not attend at the Stolperstein collocations. Previously, he had visited Náchod and Kroměříž in 2010 as well as Mauthausen in 2015. During 2015 he also published his diary, in which he described his experiences in Theresienstadt, Auschwitz and Mauthausen from 1942 to 1945.
- Karl Kraus was a medical doctor in Náchod who had a very good reputation. He became the inspiration for the character of the doctor in the story of Doctor Strass by Josef Škvorecký, published in his collection of short stories Menorah. He and his family lived in a villa with a tower directly opposite the Stráníková sanatorium. The doctor had his practice in his own house. The story of Škvorecký corresponds largely with the truth, but the conclusion was different. Doctor Kraus was murdered in the gas chambers of Auschwitz.

== Dates of collocations ==
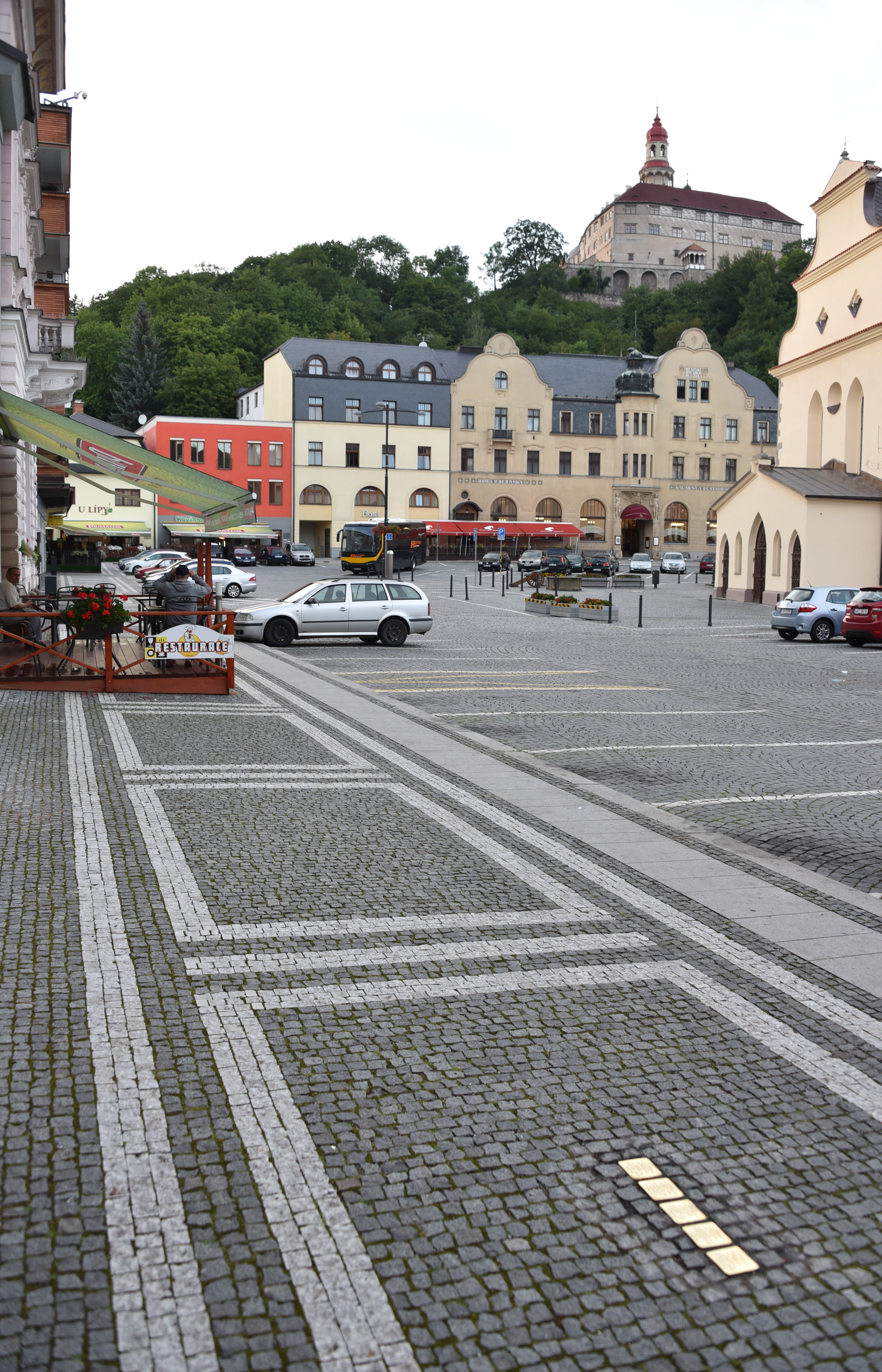
Stolpersteine for the five murdered sisters of the family Goldschmid in Náchod

According to the website of Gunter Demnig the Stolperstein of Kostelec nad Orlicí was posed on 29 October 2012, those in Náchod were placed on 2 August 2016. The Czech Stolperstein project was initiated in 2008 by the Česká unie židovské mládeže (Czech Union of Jewish Youth) and was realized with the patronage of the Mayor of Prague.

== See also ==
- List of cities by country that have stolpersteine
- Stolpersteine in the Czech Republic

== Sources ==
- Family Goldschmidová biographical information
