= Stolpersteine in the Lake Constance district =

Memorial installations in Germany

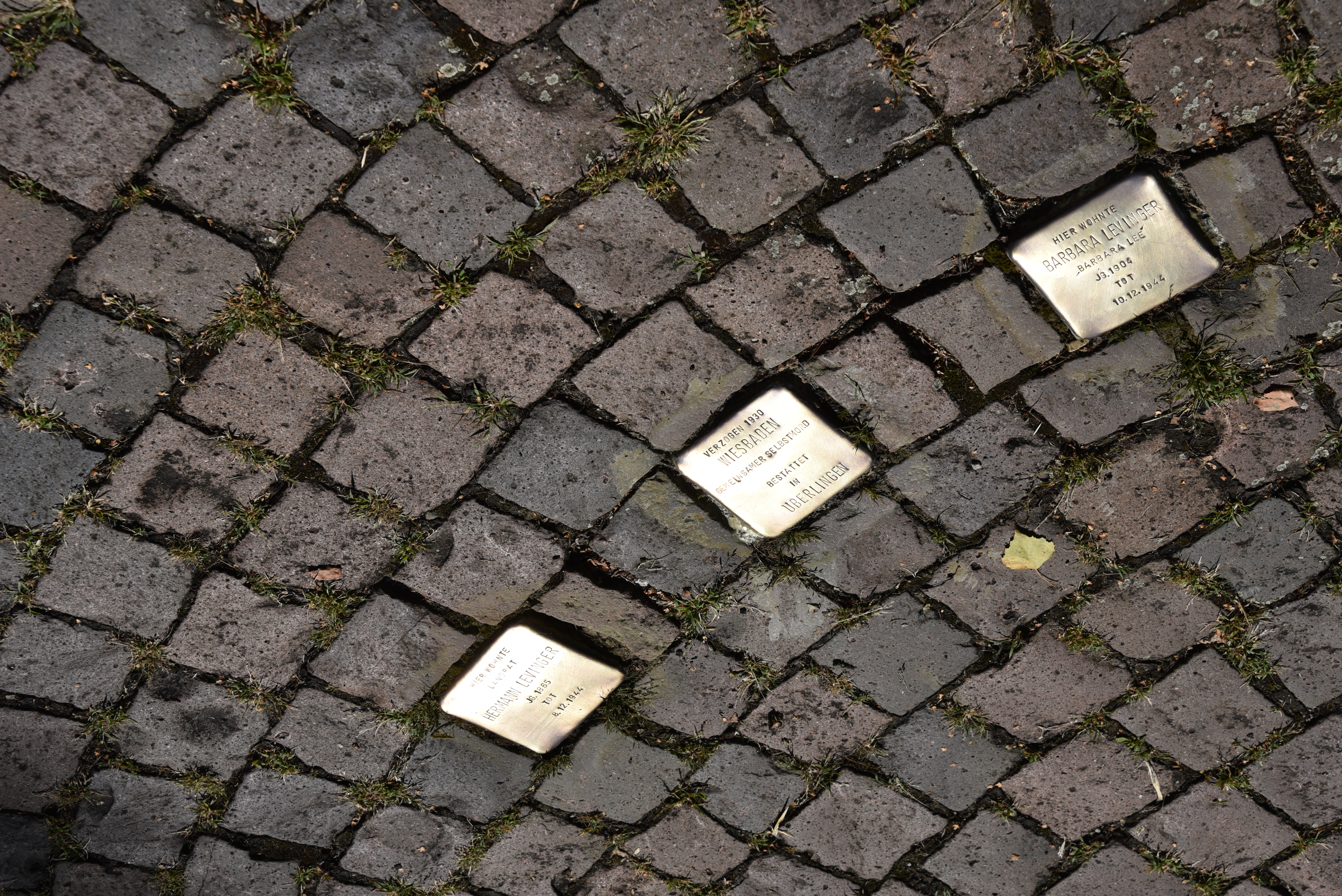
Stolpersteine for Barbara and Hermann Levinger who decided to take their lives before deportation

This article lists the Stolpersteine that have been collocated in Friedrichshafen and Überlingen in the Bodenseekreis ("Lake Constance district") in the very South of Germany. Stolpersteine is the German name for stumbling blocks collocated all over Europe by German artist Gunter Demnig. They remember the fate of the Nazi victims being murdered, deported, exiled or driven to suicide.

== Friedrichshafen ==
Stone	Inscription	Location	Life and death
	HERE LIVED; ELSA HAMMER; NÉE FELLHEIMER; BORN 1884; DEPORTED 1943; AUSCHWITZ; MURDERED 24.9.1943	Zeppelinstraße 275; 47°40′08″N 9°25′02″E	Elsa Hammer née Fellheimer was born on 1 December 1884 in Göppingen. Her parents were Isaak Fellheimer and Mathilde née Bernheim. She had two younger brothers, Joseph and Theo, and was growing up in a well protected environment. One of her relatives was Albert Einstein. She married Karl Hammer, a merchant from Göppingen. The couple moved to the Lake Constance. The Hammers did not have children, but they gave home to a foster child, Martha Mutter. The two nieces of Elsa Hammer, Margot and Lore-Luise, regularly spent their holidays with her aunt. She was the only Jew in Friedrichshafen and well respected. Due to the Christian origin of her husband she was living in a ″privileged mixed marriage″ and was therefore protected from deportation. This status ended all of a sudden when her husband died on 21 July 1943. She was arrested, brought to Stuttgart and deported to Auschwitz concentration camp on 14 September 1943. There she was murdered in the course of the Shoah. Both brothers, sister-in-law Jenny and niece Lore-Luise were all deported to Latvia and murdered in Kaunas. Only Margot Fellheimer, the other niece, could escape to England. She survived.

== Schloss Spetzgart ==
Stone	Inscription	Location	Life and death
	HERE LIVED; ERIK BLUMENFELD; BORN 1915; DEPORTED 1943; AUSCHWITZ; 1943 BUCHENWALD; RELEASED 1944; SURVIVED	Schloss Spetzgart; 47°46′55″N 9°08′24″E	Erik Blumenfeld born on 27 March 1915 in Hamburg. His parents were Ernst and Edda Blumenfeld. His father, a ship owner, coal importer and trader, died in 1927. His mother, daughter of a Danish landowner, died in 1946. He had a sister, Sonja. He spent his early childhood in Denmark, graduated from the Schule Schloss Salem, then went to England, where he completed his commercial education until 1935. Thereafter, until 1939, he studied mining and metallurgy at the Technische Hochschule in Charlottenburg (now Technische Universität Berlin). From 1938 he was a member of the board of the Kohl- und Cokes Werke AG, which was in possession of his family. He was a private in the Second World War in the years 1939 and 1940, but was then dismissed as a "half-Jew", arrested on 7 December 1942 for subversion of the war effort and deported to Auschwitz concentration camp in 1943. From there he was deported to Buchenwald concentration camp in October 1943. In August 1944, he was released to forced labor after his mother had contacted Felix Kersten, the masseur of Heinrich Himmler. On 9 January 1945 he was arrested again in Berlin, as he tried to hide a Jew. But he managed to escape and hid from the middle of April 1945 in the house of Gerd Bucerius, the attorney of his family. After 1945, he rebuilt the family business and became vice president of the Chamber of Commerce in Hamburg. On 3 April 1946, he became a member of the Denazification Central Committee. He was a founding member of the Hamburg CDU. Erik Blumenfeld, 1968 From 1961 to 1980 he served as a member of the German Bundestag, from 1973 to 1989 as a member of the European Parliament. Blumenfeld received two honorary doctorates, 1980 from Ben-Gurion University of the Negev in Be'er Scheva, 1992 the Technical University Technion in Haifa. In 1990, he was awarded the Mayor's Stolten Medal and after his death the Blankenese station square was named after him. Since 2015, the Erik-Blumenfeld-Medal has been awarded. He was married three times: 1945 with artist Sibylle Brügelmann, 1962 with Ursula Roelli and 1987 with lawyer Brigitte Lichtenauer-Blumenfeld. He died on 10 April 1997 in Hamburg.
Stolpersteine for the murdered members of family Hinrichsen in Leipzig	HERE LIVED; PAUL HINRICHSEN; BORN 1912; FORCED LABOUR 1942; NEUENDORF ESTATE; DEPORTED 1943; AUSCHWITZ; 1943 BUCHENWALD; MURDERED 24.8.1943	Schloss Spetzgart; 47°46′55″N 9°08′24″E	Paul Hinrichsen was born on 18 December 1912 in Leipzig. His parents were Henri and Martha Hinrichsen. His father conducted the Leipzig publishing house Musikverlag C. F. Peters. He had six siblings: the brothers Max, Hans-Joachim, Robert and Walter and the sisters Charlotte and Ilse. He studied agriculture, went to Brazil for a short time, and returned to Germany in 1930. Thereafter he lived in Berlin. In 1941, he was deported to a labor camp in Neuendorf (originally an institution of the Hachshara) near Fürstenwalde. On 19 April 1943, Paul Hinrichsen was deported from Berlin to Auschwitz concentration camp. There he was assassinated. His parents had left Germany in 1940 and were waiting in Belgium for visas to England or the United States, but could not get them. His mother was a diabetic and was not given any viable insulin as she was Jewish. She died in 1941. His father was deported to Auschwitz and murdered there. His brother Hans-Joachim was murdered in 1940 in Perpignan concentration camp. His other siblings could survive the Holocaust. Max had already emigrated to London in the 1930s and founded the 'Peters Edition' publishing house there. In 1936, Walter succeeded in emigrating to the US, New York, where he founded the publishing house 'C.F. Peters Corporation'. In 1945, he came back to Leipzig as an American officer and took over the Leipzig publishing house. Robert could also flee to England. Both sisters managed to survive, but Ilses husband Ludwig Frankenthal and the common sons Günther and Wolfgang were murdered in Auschwitz.

== Überlingen ==
Stone	Inscription	Location	Life and death
	HERE LIVED; FRANZ KLAUSER; BORN 1907; ARRESTED 8.1.1942; PENITENTIARY MANNHEIM; DEAD 6.11.1944 IN; LADELUND CONCENTRATION CAMP	Altenheim St. Ulrich (Sankt-Ulrich-Straße 20); 47°45′56″N 9°09′56″E	Franz Klauser was born on 11 March 1907 in Seebach. He was a hotel porter and a nurse. Until 1934 he worked in the spa hotel Bad Peterstal. Starting in 1937 he employed in the municipal hospital of Überlingen. He lived in a hospital room and continue his education at the Kneipp-Academy in Bad Wörishofen. On 8 January 1942, he was arrested on the grounds of "unnatural fornication" regarding Article 175 of the Criminal Code. He was sentenced to two years and three months imprisonment on 19 March 1942 by the County Court of Constance. He served the sentence in the prison of Mannheim. Thereafter he was deported to Natzweiler-Struthof. The camp was dissolved because of the advancing of Allied troops and one month later he was deported again, together with 249 other prisoners to Dachau concentration camp. His prisoner number was "111522 homosexual". One month later, he was transferred to the KZ Neuengamme but remained there only a few days. On 1 or 2 November 1944, he was transferred to Ladelund, a satellite camp of Neuengamme. There he died a few days later at the age of 37, on 6 November 1944. The official cause of death was, according to SS Oberscharführer Friedrich Otto Dörge, pneumonia. He was buried in the Ladelund cemetery on 10 November 1944, together with seven other prisoners. His name is engraved on a plaque of remembrance.
	HERE LIVED; HANNY LORE; LEVI; BORN 1924; KINDERTRANSPORT 1938; ENGLAND; USA	Münsterstraße 12; 47°46′00″N 9°09′36″E	Hanny Lore Levi was born in 1924 in Überlingen. Her parents were Viktor and Julie née Weil. She had a younger sister named Margot, born in 1926. After the pogrom of the so-called Kristallnacht in November 1938, her father was arrested and deported to Dachau concentration camp. He was set free under the condition that he would sell his house and his shop and emigrate with his family. Hanny and her sister Margot were able to flee to England with a Kindertransport. Hanny's parents and her grandfather Wilhelm could escape to England on 25 August 1939 where the family was reunited. The Levis emigrated to Louisville, Kentucky, where her grandfather died in 1952, her mother in 1971, her father in 1977. Hanny Lore Levi died in 2007, her sister two years later. She was the one and only family member ever coming back to Überlingen, briefly in 1946 in American uniform.
	HERE LIVED; JULIE LEVI; NÉE WEIL; BORN 1894; FORCED SALE; OF BUSINESS; ESCAPE 1939; USA	Münsterstraße 12; 47°46′00″N 9°09′36″E	Julie Levi née Weil was born in 1894 in Stockach. She was married to Viktor Levi. The couple had two daughters, Hanny Lore (born 1924) and Margot (born 1926). The Levi family owned a textile business in Überlingen, in Münstererstraße 12. After the pogrom of the so-called Kristallnacht in November 1938, her husband was arrested and deported to Dachau concentration camp. He was set free under the condition that he would sell his house and his shop and emigrate with his family. First the couple secured the survival of their daughters sending them with a children's transport to England. After the forced sale of their house, which went to an Aryan neighbor, and their warehouse, which was taken over by a competitor, the Levis had to pay "Jewish property tax," the "Reichsfluchtsteuer", the "relocation tax" and other taxes and nearly exhausted all of their funds. Nevertheless, Julie Levi, her husband and her father-in-law Wilhelm managed to escape to England on 25 August 1939. In England the parents reunited with their daughters. Thereafter the Levis migrated to Louisville, Kentucky, where William Levi died in 1952, Julie in 1971, her husband in 1977. Their daughters died in 2007 and 2009.
	HERE LIVED; MARGOT CAROLA; LEVI; BORN 1926; KINDERTRANSPORT 1938; ENGLAND; USA	Münsterstraße 12; 47°46′00″N 9°09′36″E	Margot Carola Levi was born in 1926 in Überlingen. Her parents were Viktor and Julie née Weil. She had an older sister named Hanny, born in 1924. After the pogrom of the so-called Kristallnacht in November 1938, her father was arrested and deported to Dachau concentration camp. He was set free under the condition that he would sell his house and his shop and emigrate with his family. Margot and her sister were sent to England with a children's transport. Hanny's parents and her grandfather Wilhelm managed to escape to England on 25 August 1939 where the family was reunited. The Levis emigrated to Louisville, Kentucky, where her grandfather died in 1952, her mother in 1971, her father in 1977 and her sister in 2007. Margot died in 2009. She had never came back to her home town.
	HERE LIVED; VIKTOR LEVI; BORN 1891 'PREVENTIVE CUSTODY' 1938; FORCED SALE; OF BUSINESS; ESCAPE 1939; USA	Münsterstraße 12; 47°46′00″N 9°09′36″E	Viktor Levi was born in 1891. His parents were Wilhelm and Hannchen Levi. His father opened a textile store in Überlingen in 1891 in Münstererstraße 12. He was married to Julie née Weil. The couple had two daughters, Hanny Lore (born 1924) and Margot (born 1926). After the Reichskristallnacht, Viktor was arrested and deported to Dachau, where he was released on the condition that he would sell house and business and emigrate with his family. The daughters were able to flee to England with a children's transport. After the foreclosure sale (mayor Albert Spren noted in Stadtchronik: "with these sales the house ownerships in Überlingen became completely free of Jewish property"), where the property and the house went to the neighbors (who enlarged his café) also the warehouse had to be sold – to a competitor of ″Aryan″ origin. Viktor Levi, his wife and his fatherwere able to leave for England on 25 August 1939. Despite the sales they were left without assets, as most of the sales proceeds had to be paid to the Nazi regime for "Jewish property tax", the "Reichsfluchtsteuer", the "relocation tax" and other levies. In England, the family was able to reunite. The Levis migrated to Louisville (Kentucky), where Wilhelm Levi died in 1952, Julie in 1971 and Viktor in 1977. Hanny died in 2007 and Margot in 2009.
	HERE LIVED; WILHELM LEVI; BORN 1861; FORCED SALE; OF BUSINESS; ESCAPE 1939; USA	Münsterstraße 12; 47°46′00″N 9°09′36″E	Wilhelm Levi was born in 1861 in Mühringen near Horb. He was married to Hannchen née Frank who was born on 13 December 1864 in Buttenhausen. The couple had two sons: Charles, who died in 1916 at Verdun in the First World War, and Viktor. In 1891, Wilhelm opened a textile shop in Münsterstrasse, a prominent location in Überlingen. In 1909, Wilhelm Levi was elected to the citizens' committee. After the pogrom of the so-called Kristallnacht in November 1938, his son Viktor was arrested and deported to Dachau concentration camp. He was set free under the condition that he would sell his house and his shop and emigrate with his family. Wilhelm Levi's granddaughters Hanny and Carola were immediately sent to England with a children's transport. After the forced sale of shop and house Albert Spren, then mayor of Überlingen, stated: ″With these sales the properties of Überlingen have been completely freed from Jewish ownership.″ Most of the revenues were exhausted for the "Jewish property tax," the "Reichsfluchtsteuer", the "relocation tax" and other taxes. Nevertheless, Wilhelm Levi, his son Victor and his daughter-in-law Julie managed to flee to England on 25 August 1939, only few days before the outbreak of WW2. The Levis emigrated to Louisville, Kentucky, where Wilhelm Levi died in 1952, at the age of 90 or 91. His son survived him by 25 years.
	HERE LIVED; BARBARA LEVINGER 'BARBARA LEE'; BORN 1904; DEAD; 10.12.1944 RELOCATED 1930; WIESBADEN; CONJOINED SUICIDE; BURIED; IN; ÜBERLINGEN HERE LIVED; COUNTY COMMISSIONER; HERMANN LEVINGER; BORN 1865; DEAD; 8.12.1944	Bahnhofstraße 4; 47°46′07″N 9°09′14″E	Barbara Levinger was born on 26 December 1904 in Mannheim. Her parents were Hermann and Maria Levinger. In the 1920s she worked as an actress and also devoted herself to writing (under the pseudonym Barbara Lee). In 1931, her only novel Johann Zundler was published. In 1930, the family had moved to Wiesbaden as the mother was suffering from gout and a cure was hoped for. But she died in 1933. When Barbara Levinger and her father learned in December 1944 that they were to be deported, they took their lives using poison. Her father died immediately, Barbara Levinger only two days later, on December 10.
	HERE LIVED; BARBARA LEVINGER 'BARBARA LEE'; BORN 1904; DEAD; 10.12.1944 RELOCATED 1930; WIESBADEN; CONJOINED SUICIDE; BURIED; IN; ÜBERLINGEN HERE LIVED; COUNTY COMMISSIONER; HERMANN LEVINGER; BORN 1865; DEAD; 8.12.1944	Bahnhofstraße 4; 47°46′07″N 9°09′14″E	Hermann Levinger was born on 25 August 1865 in Karlsruhe. He studied law. During this period he converted to Protestantism. He became an official at the District Office of Überlingen, then worked at the district council of Mannheim, then became the executive commissioner of the Grand Ducal District Office, and finally Landrat. In 1902, he married the widow Maria Karolina von Bünau née Staib. In 1904, their only daughter Barbara was born. In 1930, Levinger retired and the family moved to Wiesbaden, where they were hoping for a cure for Maria Levinger, who suffered of gout. But she died in 1933. On 8 December 1944, Hermann Levinger and his daughter – after they had learned that they were to be deported to Auschwitz – decided to end their lives. They took poison. The old man died the same day, his daughter two days later.

== Dates of collocations ==
The Stolpersteine in the Bodenseekreis were collocated by the artist himself on the following dates:

- 9 April 2009: Überlingen, Bahnhofstraße 4
- 13 July 2010: Überlingen, Altenheim St. Ulrich
- 9 September 2013: Friedrichshafen
- 21 May 2014: Schloss Spetzgart; Überlingen, Münsterstraße 12

== See also ==
- List of cities by country that have stolpersteine
