= Stolpersteine in Ústí nad Labem Region =

Memorial installation in Czech Republic

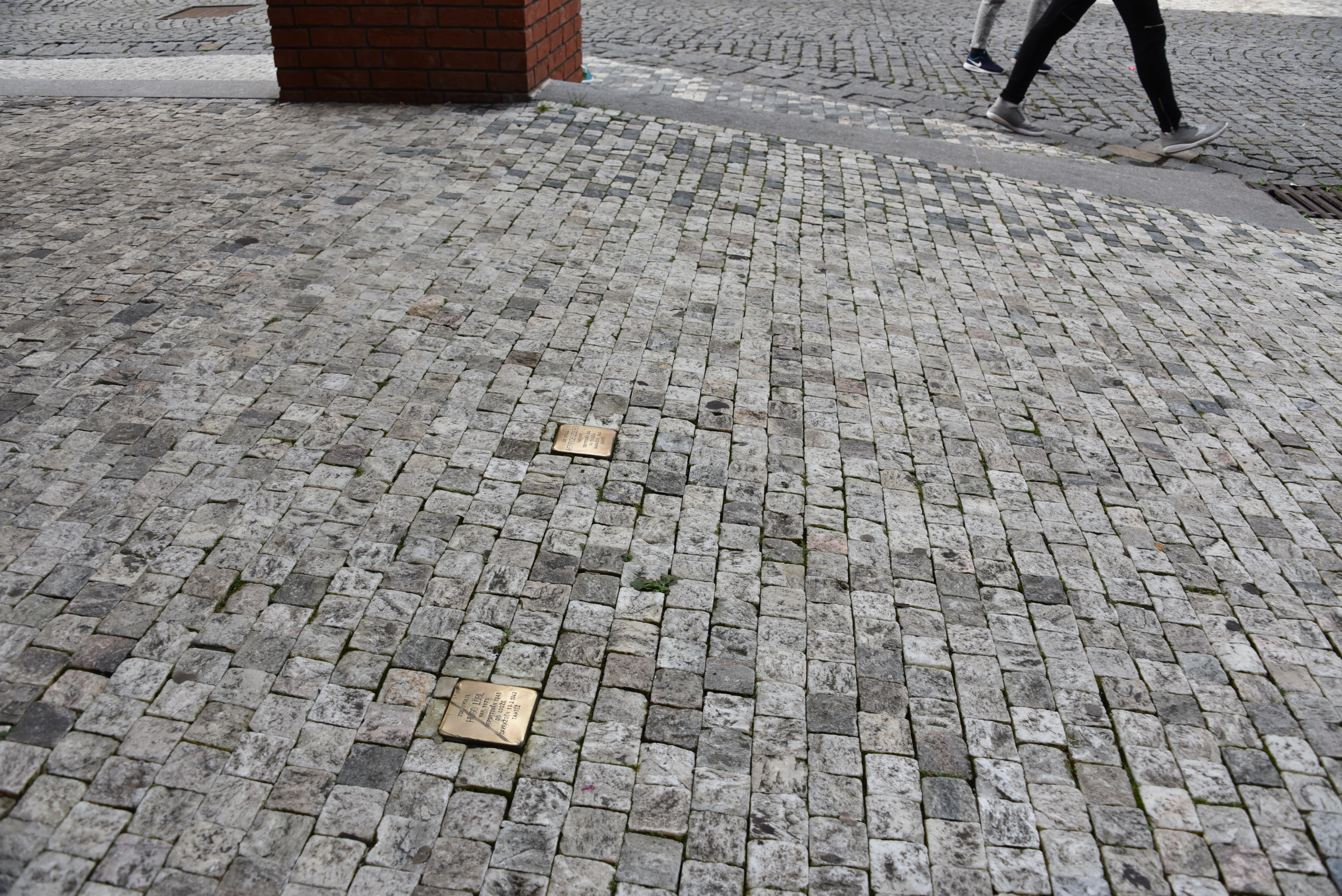
Stolpersteine for Hugo Löbl and Heinrich Lederer in Teplice

This article lists the Stolpersteine in the Ústí nad Labem Region in the north-west of the Czech Republic. Stolpersteine is the German name for stumbling blocks collocated all over Europe by German artist Gunter Demnig. They remember the fate of the Nazi victims being murdered, deported, exiled or driven to suicide.

Generally, the stumbling blocks are posed in front of the building where the victims had their last self chosen residence. The name of the Stolpersteine in Czech is: Kameny zmizelých, stones of the disappeared.

The lists are sortable; the basic order follows the alphabet according to the last name of the victim.

== Děčín ==
Stone	Inscription	Location	Life and death
	HERE LIVED; VILHELMINA 'MINNA'; PÄCHTER; NÉE STEIN; BORN 1872; MURDERED 1944; IN THERESIENSTADT	Thomayerova 3/35; 50°46′31″N 14°11′54″E	Vilhelmina Pächter née Stein, also Wilhelmina, Minna or Mina, was born on 16 July 1872 in Hluboká nad Vltavou (German: Frauenberg). She was the sixth and youngest daughter of Heinrich Stein, a tanner. Her great-grandfather Wolf (Ze'ev) Lazar Stein (1700-1762?) was already a tanner and also a court Jew to the Count of Schwarzenberg. She attended a teachers' seminary in Prague, studying arts and literature. To the dismay of her parents, about 1900 she married Adolf Pächter, a widower with six children, twenty-seven years older than her. The couple had two children on their own: Heinz (born in 1904) and Anna Wilma (born in 1907), but she took care also of Adolf's children. Her husband owned a button factory and was the wealthiest man of Bodenbach. His family led a prosperous existence and his support enabled the Jewish community to build a synagogue. The family's luck turned in 1915 when Adolf died of pneumonia and none of his children had the skills to run the factory. Vilhelmina became an art dealer and supported herself and the children. Her daughter studied art history and married attorney George Stern from Lovosice in 1930. The couple had a son named Peter, later called David. Vilhelmina Pächter came to live with her daughter's family. Her son married Dorothea Schipfer in Germany, became a Zionist and moved to British Palestine. Vilhelmina strongly opposed his actions, but the exile saved his life. In late 1938, when the Nazis occupied the so-called Sudetenland, all members of the Stern and Pächter family could flee to Prague in time. But thereafter, in March 1939, the Nazis also conquered Prague. George Stern could escape to Palestine. At the end of November 1939, also Anna and their son — with the support of Jakob Edelstein — could follow the same route. Vilhelmina Pächter was deported to Theresienstadt concentration camp on 16 July 1942 where she wrote a cook book that survived the Nazi regime. Most elderly persons in Theresienstadt suffered of hunger due to the reduced portions of food given to them. She collected recipes from 13 inmates who remembered better times when they still could cook and eat well. Minna also composed humorous rhymes about her room-partners and a poem for a wedding in the camp. The cook book was later-on published in English, French and Italian. When her health deteriorated in 1943 she was taken care of Liesel Reich, a granddaughter of her deceased husband, who worked as nurse in the camp's hospital. Nevertheless, she died of long-time starvation on 25 September 1944, at Yom Kippur. Her grandson David Stern, who archived a doctorate in physics in Israel, moved to the US in 1959. He wrote several texts about her life and how the cook book came into the hands of the family.

== Teplice ==
Stone	Inscription	Location	Life and death
	HERE LIVED; IRMA BLOCH; BORN 1886; DEPORTED 1942; TO THERESIENSTADT; MURDERED 1943; IN AUSCHWITZ	Masarykova 652/18; 50°38′31″N 13°49′43″E	Irma Blochová née Löwy was born on 10 November 1886 in Teplice. Her parents were the physician Dr. Moritz Löwy and Flora née Auerbach. She married jurist Ludwig (Ludvík) Bloch. The couple had at least one son and one daughter: Lilly (born in 1913) and Herbert. The last address of the couple before deportation was in Prague in Podskalská 40. On 16 July 1942 Irma Blochová and her husband were deported with transport AAr to Theresienstadt concentration camp. Her transport number was 74. On 6 September 1943 the couple was deported to Auschwitz concentration camp. There both husband and wife were murdered by the Nazi regime. Their children could both survive the Shoah. Daughter Lilly also became a jurist and in 1940 she married Erich Liban from Vyhne. From 1 July 1940 to 29 August 1944 she was interred in the Vyhne concentration camp. The couple emigrated to Israel in the 1950s. Son Herbert married Grete née Justiz in 1939 and, together with his wife, emigrated to British Palestine. It was him who reported the death of his parents to Yad Vashem in 1990. At that time Herbert Bloch lived in Haifa, Israel.
	HERE LIVED; LISBETH FELDSTEIN; BORN 1900; DEPORTED 1942; TO THERESIENSTADT; MURDERED 1943; IN AUSCHWITZ	Masarykova 400/15; 50°38′34″N 13°49′44″E	Lisbeth Feldstein née Stein, also Alžběta Feldsteinová, was born on 2 May 1900 in Teplice. Her parents were Dr. Emil Stein and Margarete née Baum. She had two sisters. She was married to Dr. Rudolf Feldstein. The couple had a son. Before deportation, the couple lived in Prague in V Šáreckém údolí 528. Lisbeth Feldsteinová and her husband were deported from Prague to Theresienstadt concentration camp on 20 November 1942 with the transport CC (her number on the transport was 258). From there she and their husband were deported to Auschwitz concentration camp on 20 January 1943 with transport Cq (her number on this transport was 1045). Lisbeth Feldsteinová and her husband did not survive the Shoah. Her mother Margarete and her sister Klementina were also murdered by nazi authorities. Her sister Marianne was able to flee to England, where she married a man named Norton. Later-on she reported the death of mother and sister to Yad Vashem.
No picture yet	HERE LIVED; DR. MED. VICTOR HAHN; BORN 1891; DEPORTED 1941; TO THERESIENSTADT; MURDERED 25.10.1944; IN AUSCHWITZ	Masarykova trida 1595/54; Either address not correct or Stolperstein removed	Dr. Viktor Hahn was born on 19 February 1891 in Teplice. His parents were Robert and Auguste Hahn. He became a gynecologist and was married in first marriage to Grete née Riethof. The couple hat a son, Heinz Lothar, born in 1918, and lived in Vienna for seven years. Viktor worked in a gynecological clinic. After the end of the World War the family returned to Teplice. In 1928 Grete and Viktor were divorced. In 1929 or 1930 Viktor married again. His second wife Katharina (married Bloch, born Bruml) had two daughters from her first marriage. The younger one remained with the father (Viktor Hahn had assisted during her birth in 1921). Around 1938, the family moved to Brno. His son Heinz emigrated to England in 1938, originally to learn the language, but remained there. Also Viktor and Katerina were preparing for emigration and learned English. They wanted to emigrate to the USA via England. Relatives in the USA had already procured affidavits for the couple and the two daughters. Hannerl already had all the necessary papers, but Marietta was not yet 18, so the family waited. After the German occupation and destruction of Czechoslovakia, the Hahns had to live with the commander of the Gestapo under one roof. He originally wanted to occupy the entire house, but then contented himself with one floor. One month later, Viktor Hahn and his family moved to Prague, where they lived with Katerina's mother and Viktor's father, Robert. In December 1941, Victor's father died. Also his mother-in-law died. The family had to leave the apartment in the Pod Klaudiánkou and move to a "Jewish apartment" in Pařížská where they lived together with four other families. Their space was so small, there was only room for one bed. On 11 December, Viktor, his wife and the two daughters had to go to a meeting place in Veletržní palác. From there they were deported on 14 December 1941 by transport M (Viktor's number on the transport was 565) from Prague to Theresienstadt concentration camp. There Viktor Hahn practiced as a doctor for the inmates. Because of this, he was able to get his family into his barracks. Furthermore, he was on a protection list and also his family was protected for a short period. After Viktor looked at a lock in the Elbe, he and Katerina were placed on a transport list. The two daughters volunteered to join their parents. On 23 October 1944, the family was deported to Auschwitz concentration camp with transport Et (Viktor's number on the transport was 1183). Dr. Viktor Hahn was shot dead on the day of his arrival in Auschwitz. His wife also did not survive Auschwitz, she died of dysentery shortly after her arrival. His son Heinz survived, married and became a father. He died in 1997. Viktor's house in Teplice was restored to his step daughter. At that time, there was a museum on the ground floor of the building, which remained there for a small rent. Marietta Smolková later sold this house because she could not afford renovation. Two further houses, originally belonging to the Hahn family, had not been restored by 2005.
No picture yet	HERE LIVED; KATEŘINA HAHNOVÁ; BORN 1894; DEPORTED 1941; TO THERESIENSTADT; MURDERED 10.11.1944; IN AUSCHWITZ	Masarykova trida 1595/54; Either address not correct or Stolperstein removed	Katerina Hahnová née Bruml then Bloch was born on 8 November 1894 in Duchcov. Her parents were Adolf and Ida Bruml, owners of the textile business "Adolf Bruml" and some branches. After the elementary school, she attended a girls' school in Dresden. In 1915, Katerina married Artur Bloch, the owner of a porcelain factory in Dubí, which he had taken over from his father after his death in 1909. The original name of the factory was B. Bloch, after the takeover Bloch a spool (Bloch and Partner). After the Nazis took power in the ČSR, he was forced to sell the factory. It is still in existence under the name Český Porcelán. The couple had two daughters: Hannerle (born 1916) and Marietta (born 1921). In 1929, the marriage was divorced. Daughter Hannerle remained with the mother, Marietta lived with her father. Katerina shortly after her divorce married the gynecologist Viktor Hahn, who had assisted her during the birth of Marietta. Viktor had a son, Heinz, from his first marriage (the divorce was 1928), who lived in the new household as well. The family moved to Brno, where, in October 1938, daughter Marietta joined her mother, since her father had lost his factory in 1938 and the conditions in Prague, where they first moved, were very limited. Katerina's daughter Hannerl worked in a children's hospital. All family members learned English and prepared for the emigration. The plan was to emigrate to the United States, via England. Both daughters had already found jobs in a Jewish house in London (one as a maid, the other one as a cook). Hannerl already had all the necessary papers, but Marietta was not yet 18, so the family waited. After the German occupation and destruction of Czechoslovakia the Hahn family moved to Prague, where they lived with Katerina's mother and Viktor's father. But within few years both parents died. The family had to leave their apartment and move to a "Jewish apartment" where they had to live with four other families. Their living space was tiny. On 14 December 1941, Katerina Hahnová, her husband and her daughters were deported from Prague to Theresienstadt concentration camp with transport M (her number on the transport was 566). There, Viktor Hahn practiced as a doctor and could get his family into his barrack. The family was on a protection list for a short period. After Viktor Hahn and Katerina were placed on a transport list, the two daughters volunteered to join their parents. On 23 October 1944, the family was deported to Auschwitz concentration camp with transport Et (her number on the transport was 1184). Dr. Viktor Hahn was shot dead on the day of his arrival in Auschwitz. Katerina Hahnová died of dysentery shortly after her arrival. Katerina's daughters both have survived the Shoah. Hannerl died in 1983, Marietta still lived in 2005.
	HERE LIVED; ADOLF KANN; BORN 1862; DEPORTED 1942; TO TREBLINKA; MURDERED; IBIDEM	Krupská 22/37; 50°38′28″N 13°49′37″E	Adolf Kann was born on 6 June 1862 in Litvínov. His parents were Eduard and Julie Kann née Löwy. He was a merchant in Teplice and married Frederika née Freund in 1894. The couple had five children: Grete (born 1896), Erwin (born 1898), Gertrud (born 1901), Edith (born 1905) and Herbert (born 1909). Prior to their deportation, Adolf Kann and his wife were registered in Prague in Böhmova 1329. On 20 July 1942, the couple was deported to Theresienstadt concentration camp with transport AA (his number on the transport was 48). From here he was deported on 22 October 1942, again together with his wife, with transport Bx (his number on this transport was the 1872) to Treblinka extermination camp. Adolf Kann and his wife Bedřiška were murdered in the course of the Shoah. Also murdered by the Nazi regime were the daughters Grete und Gertrude and their families. Gertrud and Robert Bermeiser and their adopted daughter Eva (born 1936) were all deported to Łódź Ghetto in 1941. Grete and Josef Schück were deported first to Theresienstadt and then to Riga in 1942. The fate of the other children is not known.
	HERE LIVED; BEDŘIŠKA KANNOVÁ; BORN 1870; DEPORTED 1942; TO TREBLINKA; MURDERED; IBIDEM	Krupská 22/37; 50°38′28″N 13°49′37″E	Bedřiška Kannová née Freundová was born on 1 November 1870 in Lomnice. Her parents were Edmund Freund and Henriette née Freundová. She was married to Adolf Kann, a merchant. The couple had five children: Grete (born 1896), Erwin (born 1898), Gertrud (born 1901), Edith (born 1905) and Herbert (born 1909). Before deportation, Bedřiška Kannová and her husband were reported in Prague in the Böhmova 1329. On 20 July 1942, she and her husband were transported from Prague to Theresienstadt concentration camp with transport AA (her number on the transport was 49). From there she was deported on 22 October 1942, again together with her husband, with transport Bx (her number on this transport was the 1873) to Treblinka extermination camp. Adolf Kann and his wife Bedřiška were murdered in the course of the Shoah. Also her daughters Grete and Gertrude and their husbands Josef Schück and Robert Bermeiser did not survive the Shoah. Even the little girl Eva, the adopted daughter of Gertrude and Robert, born in 1936, was killed by the Nazi authorities. The fate of Bedřiška's other children is not known.
	HERE LIVED; HEINRICH LEDERER; BORN 1875; DEPORTED 1942; TO THERESIENSTADT; MURDERED; IBIDEM	Krupská 346; Nákupní centrum Fontána; 50°38′28″N 13°49′28″E	Heinrich Lederer was born on 23 January 1875. He was deported to Theresienstadt on 27 November 1942 from Ústí nad Labem with transport XIX / 3 (his number on the transport was 114). Heinrich Lederer was murdered on 19 December 1943.
	HERE LIVED; HUGO LÖBL; BORN 1875; DEPORTED 1942; TO ŁÓDŹ; MURDERED 19.2.1942; IBIDEM	Krupská 346; Nákupní centrum Fontána; 50°38′28″N 13°49′28″E	Hugo Löbl was born on 16 July 1875 in Jablonec nad Nisou. His parents were Albert Löbl and Helena née Straschnová. Hugo Löbl was the owner of a paper shop in Teplice and married to Alice née Spitzová, born on 18 May 1894 in Liberec. Prior to deportation, Hugo and his wife lived in Prague in Radhošťská 3. On 21 October 1941, he and his wife were deported with transport B to Ghetto Litzmannstadt. Hugo Löbl was murdered on 29 February 1942. Also his wife did not survived the Shoah. His half sister Frieda (born 1895), her husband Hugo Robitschek (born 1887) and their daughter Helga (born 1929) were all murdered in Auschwitz in 1944.
Stone was removed end of 2014 or beginning of 2015	HERE LIVED; RUDOLF PERUTZ; BORN 1882; DEPORTED 1942; TO THERESIENSTADT; MURDERED; IN AUSCHWITZ	U Císarských lázní 368	Rudolf Perutz was born in Ústí nad Labem on 17 June 1882. He was a banker and married to Anna née Blumberg. The couple had three children: Bertold (born 1913), Arnošt (born 1923) and Renata (born 1926). At last, Rudolf, his wife and his two younger children lived in Prague in Beethovenova 49. His son Bertold lived with his wife at another Prague address. On 15 May 1942 Rudolf, Anna and Renata Perutz were deported from Prague to Theresienstadt concentration camp with the transport of Au 1. His number on the transport was 556. From there he, his wife and his daughter were deported to Auschwitz concentration camp on 6 September 1943 with transport Dm. His number on this transport was 4370. Rudolf Perutz did not survive the Shoah. His wife Anna and the three children also could not survive the Shoah: Bertold and his wife died in Lublin. Arnošt was deported in 1941 and killed in Auschwitz. Renata was also brought to death in Auschwitz.
	HERE LIVED; EMIL SCHLING; BORN 1881; DEPORTED 1942; TO THERESIENSTADT; MURDERED; IN MALY TROSTENETS	Lipová 413; 50°38′29″N 13°50′06″E	Emil Schling, also Šling, was born on 14 May 1881. He was a manufacturer and married to Klara née Kraus. The couple had three children: Martha (born 1907), Alice (born 1909) and Otto born 1912. The family lived at least in 1912 in Nová Cerekev, where son Otto was born. After the First World War the family moved to Teplice as Emil became a co-owner of a paper factory in Podmokly. Emil's wife, Klara, died in 1933. [22] His last address before the deportation was the Havelská 7 in Prague. On 27 July 1942 he was deported from Prague to Theresienstadt by transport AAu (his number on the transport was 499). From here he was deported to the extermination camp Maly Ttrostinez on 25 August 1942 (his number on this transport was the 783). Emil Schling has not survived the Shoah. Emil Schling also deported Eliška Schlingová (born 1890), previously residing in Prague at the same address. It also did not survive. [23] [24] Son Otto Šling fought in the Spanish Civil War, found exile in London and returned to Czechoslovakia in 1945. He became a politician, was brought to court in the Slánský trial, sentenced to death and executed in 1952.
	HERE LIVED; GRETE SCHÜCKOVÁ; BORN 1896; DEPORTED 1942; TO RIGA; MURDERED; IBIDEM	Krupská 22/37; 50°38′28″N 13°49′37″E	Grete Schücková née Kannová was born in Teplice on 8 April 1896. Her parents were Adolf Kann and Bedřiška (Frederika) Kannová. Grete had four siblings: Erwin, Gerrtud, Edith and Herbert. She married Josef Schück. Prior to deportation, she was registered in Prague. On 30 July 1942, she was deported to Theresienstadt concentration camp with transport AAc (her number on this transport was the 910). On 20 August 1942 she was deported to Riga with transport Bb (her number on the transport was 376). Grete Schücková was murdered by the Nazi regime in the course of the Shoah. Also her husband and her parents could not survive. Josef Schück was deported to Theresienstadt in 1941 and then to Riga in January 1942. Her parents were deported to Theresienstadt in 1942 and finally to Treblinka.
	HERE LIVED; DR. BRUNO SPITZER; BORN 1909; DEPORTED 1942; TO THERESIENSTADT; MURDERED; IN RAASIKU	U Kamennych lázni 339; 50°38′27″N 13°50′13″E	Bruno Spitzer was born on 25 October 1909. Prior to deportation he lived in Prague in Masná 19. From there he was deported to Theresienstadt concentration camp on 12 May 1942 with the transport of Au (his number on this transport was the 946). On 1 September 1942 he was deported from here to Raasiku. Bruno Spitzer did not survive the Shoah.
No picture yet	HERE LIVED; ALFRED URBACH; BORN 1859; DEPORTED 1942; TO THERESIENSTADT; MURDERED 11.9.1942; IBIDEM	Vrchlického 1093; Either address not correct or Stolperstein removed	Alfred Urbach was born on 14 June 1859 in Hohenstadt. His parents were Alois Urbach and Beate née Oppenheim. Alfred married Clara née Winterberg in 1889. The couple had five children: Kurt (born 1890), [25], Walter (born 1891), [26] Robert (born 1892), [27] Rosa (born 1893) [28] and Gertrud (born 1903). The family lived in Teplice in Richard-Wagner-Straße 12. In March 1939 at least Alfred and Klara moved to České Budějovice, and in July of the same year to Prague.[30] Subsequently, at least Klara lived in Kaprova 12 [31]. Their last address before the deportation (here both were reported) was Radešovická 1331. On 6 July 1942, Alfred and his wife Klara were deported to Theresienstadt concentration camp by transport AAn (his number on the transport was the 350). According to the death certificate, Alfred Urbach died there of Parkinson's disease on 11 September 1942. [32] His wife Klara also died in Theresienstadt on 4 May 1943.[33] His son Walter Urbach died already in 1924.[34] Nothing is known about the other children, except that they were still alive at the time of Alfred Urbach's death.

== Žatec ==
Stone	Inscription	Location	Life and death
	HERE LIVED; KARL KAHN; BORN 1865; SUICIDE; ON THE RUN	Volynskch Cechu 329; 50°19′29″N 13°32′38″E	Karl Kahn was born in 1865. He traded with hop and was known as a benevolent man. He fled and later committed suicide to avoid deportation by the National Socialists.
	HERE LIVED; HEINRICH LÖBL; BORN 1881; DEPORTED 1942; TO THERESIENSTADT; MURDERED 1942; IN IZBICA	Masarykova 9/637; 50°19′34″N 13°32′41″E	Heinrich Löbl, also Jindřich, was born on 15 February 1881. He was deported from Kladno to Theresienstadt concentration camp on 22 February 1942 with transport Y (his number on this transport was the 500). From here he was deported to the Izbica Ghetto on 17 March 1942 with transport Ab (his number on this transport was the 937). Jindřich Löbl has not survived the Shoah.
	HERE LIVED; SOPHIE LÖBLOVÁ; BORN 1880; DEPORTED 1942; TO THERESIENSTADT; MURDERED 1942; IN IZBICA	Masarykova 9/637; 50°19′34″N 13°32′41″E	Sophie Löblová, also Žofie, was born on 19 July 1880. She was deported from Kladno to Theresienstadt concentration camp on 22 February 1942 with transport Y (her number on this transport was the 501). From here she was deported to the Izbica Ghetto on 17 March 1942 with transport Ab (her number on this transport was the 938). Žofie Löblová has not survived the Shoah.

== Dates of collocations ==
The Stolpersteine in the Ústecký kraj were collocated by the artist himself on the following dates:

- 15 June 2011: Teplice (Irma Bloch, Lisbeth Feldstein, Heinrich Lederer, Hugo Löbl, Rudolf Perutz, Emil Schling, Dr. Bruno Spitzer, Alfred Urbach)
- 17 July 2013: Teplice (names or addresses to be added)
- 12 September 2014: Děčín and Žatec

The Czech Stolperstein project was initiated in 2008 by the Česká unie židovské mládeže (Czech Union of Jewish Youth) and was realized with the patronage of the Mayor of Prague.

== See also ==
- List of cities by country that have stolpersteine
