= Stolpersteine in Prague-Malá Strana =

Memorial installations in Czech Republic

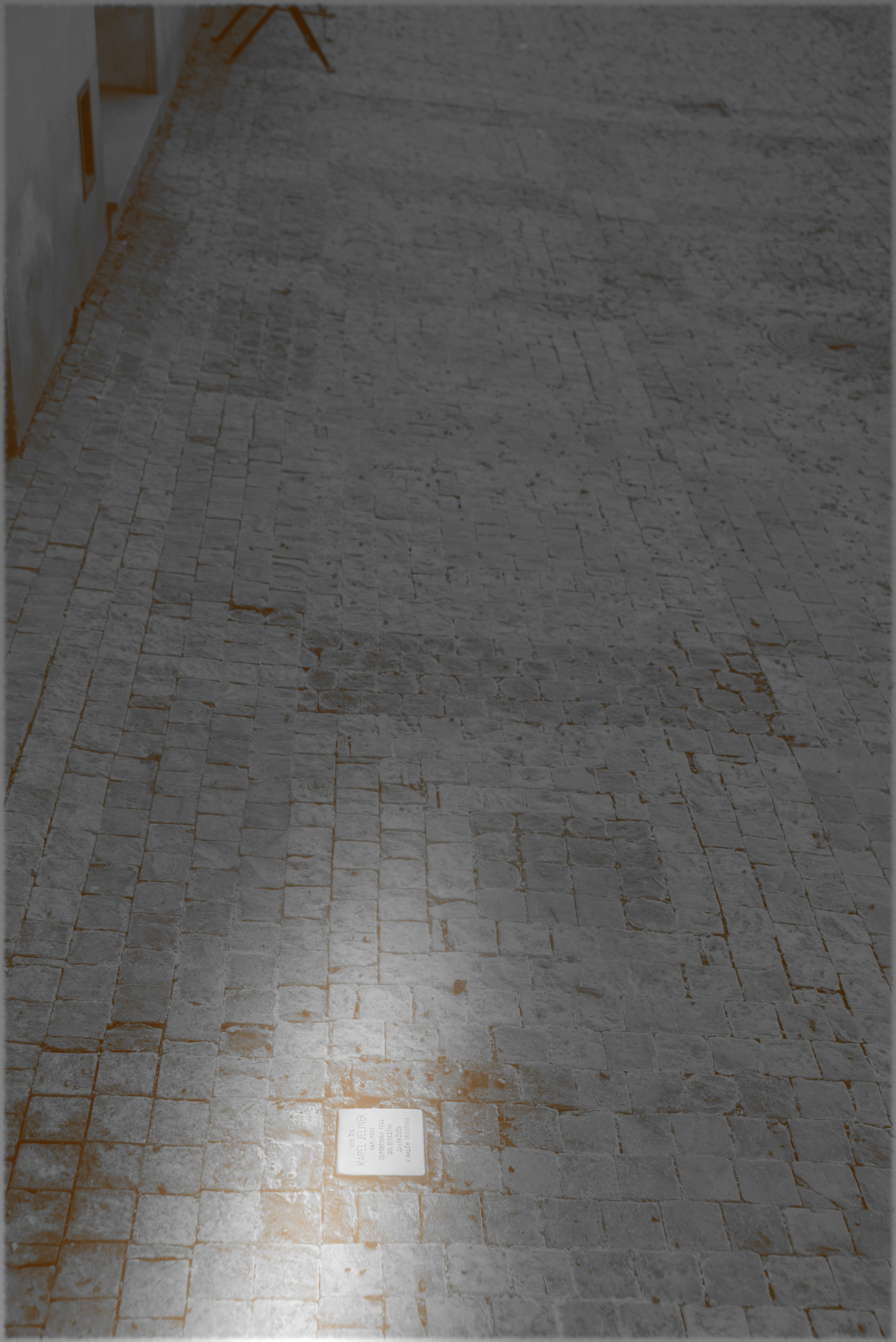
Stolperstein for Karel Jelinek

This article lists the Stolpersteine in the town quarter Malá Strana (Czech for "Little Side (of the River)", German: Prager Kleinseite) of Prague. Stolpersteine is the German name for stumbling blocks collocated all over Europe by German artist Gunter Demnig. They remember the fate of the Nazi victims being murdered, deported, exiled or driven to suicide.

Generally, the stumbling blocks are posed in front of the building where the victims had their last self chosen residence. The name of the Stolpersteine in Czech is: Kameny zmizelých.

== Malá Strana ==
Stone	Inscription	Location	Life and death
	HERE LIVED; KAREL JELINEK; BORN 1895; DEPORTED 1942; TO THERESIENSTADT; MURDERED; IN MALY TROSTINEC	Zborovská 84/60; 50°03′59″N 14°27′07″E	Karel Jelinek was born on 12 August 1895 in Vienna as Karl Jelinek. He was married to Margarete née Winternitzová. Karel had two children: daughter Hana, born on 1 August 1922 (with Margarete) and Son Otto (Musil), born 1934. In 1940, together with his wife and his parents-in-law he was accused of creating a ″fraudulent Jewish gang″. It was found out that the couple was separated and his wife stayed with her parents at another apartment in Prague. Nevertheless, in 1941 he obtained a Certificate of good character needed for emigration. He could not realize his intention to emigrate. His last address before deportation was Matyáše Brauna 60 in Prague (= Zborovská Street today). On 10 August 1942 Karel Jelinek was deported with Transport Ba from Prague to Theresienstadt concentration camp. His transport number was 135 of 1474. On 8 September 1942 he was deported with transport Bk to Maly Trostenets extermination camp. His transport number was 193 of 1000. He was murdered by the Nazi regime. His wife and his daughter were both deported in July 1942, first to Theresienstadt, then to Maly Trostenets extermination camp. They were both murdered. His son Otto, who was only eight years old when his father was deported, could survive the Shoah. He married, became a father and later-on a grand father. He and his family are still living in Prague. Only in 2010 he was informed by the Jewish community about the fate of his father. In 2011, he was present at the laying of the Stolperstein for his father.
	HERE LIVED; ARTUR LASCH; BORN 1881; DEPORTED 1942; TO THERESIENSTADT; MURDERED; IN AUSCHWITZ	Thunovská 197/17; 50°05′21″N 14°24′06″E	Artur Lasch was born on 29 May 1881 in Česká Lípa. He became a chemist and achieved a doctorate. His last address before deportation was Thunovská 17 in Prague. On 30 January 1942 he was deported with Transport V from Prague to Theresienstadt concentration camp. His transport number was 124 of 1002. On 6 September 1943 he was deported with transport Dl to Auschwitz concentration camp. His transport number was 1190 of 2484. He was murdered by the Nazi regime.
	HERE LIVED; DR. JUR. PŘEMYSL; ŠÁMAL; BORN 1867; ARRESTED 1940; MURDERED 9.3.1941; IN BERLIN	Karmelitská 382/14; 50°05′09″N 14°24′15″E	Přemysl Šámal was born on 4 October 1867 in Prague. After graduating from the Law Faculty of Charles University, he worked as a lawyer as well as in the Museum of the Czech Kingdom. Judr. Přemysl Šámal, painting by Ivan Mrkvička, 1925 He became an active member of the Czech Progressive Party in 1914 and was one of the founders and organizers of the resistance organization Maffia against the Austrian-Hungarian monarchy. Despite his advanced age, after 15 March 1939 he became one of leading anti-Nazi resistance fighters and the head of an illegal political organization. On 26 January 1940 he was arrested by the Gestapo, went through four months of severe interrogations and was then deported to Moabit prison in Berlin. His health was already in critical condition when he was released at a high bail. Thereafter, he lived under house arrest at a private nursing home. Soon, on 9 March 1941, he deceased. The entire family had to suffer due to Sippenhaft. His son Jaromir, a professor of entomology, was shot dead in the aftermath of the Heydrich assassination. His wife was sent to Auschwitz. Two grandchildren were first deported to an internment camp in Poland and later-on submitted to ″re-education″ in German families.

== Dates of collocations ==
The Stolpersteine of Prague-Malá Strana were posed by the artist himself on the following days:

- 13 June 2011: Karel Jelinek
- 28 October 2012: Artur Lasch
- 17 July 2013: Přemysl Šámal

The Czech Stolperstein project was initiated in 2008 by the Česká unie židovské mládeže (Czech Union of Jewish Youth) and was realized with the patronage of the Mayor of Prague.

== See also ==
- List of places with Stolpersteine
- Stolpersteine in the Czech Republic
