= Arts Initiative KNIE =

Arts Initiative KNIE was founded as an initiative for contemporary art in 1995 in Oberndorf bei Salzburg. It is the origin of the stolperstein project in Braunau am Inn District.

Influenced by the concept of intervention, the Arts Initiative KNIE sees itself as an intermediary and a critical voice. The Arts Initiative KNIE installed art in the public sphere, where the relationship to its location is unmistakable. The Grenzpavillion ("Border Pavilion"), located on the Salzachknie riverbend between Laufen and Oberndorf, has ideal qualifications. The pavilion is a large cube, roughly 8 meters a side, with doors, windows and a weatherproof roof. Over time, it became an "art station", which from 1995 to 2002 served primarily as a venue for symposia.

Concepts such as borders, river, bridge, relationship history, technology, disaster, nature and art are transposed by invited artists into sensory images to experience. National and international artists have created installations, performance evenings, onomatopoeia and paintings.

In 1997, Gunter Demnig's Project Stolperstein nearly ended Initiative KNIE. On February 2, 2002, German artists Julius Deutschbauer and Gerhard Spring announced the end of the arts initiative. In 2006, Andreas Maislinger invited Gunter Demnig back to Braunau am Inn to install 13 more stolpersteine in honor of Nazi victims.
