= Gunter Demnig =

German artist

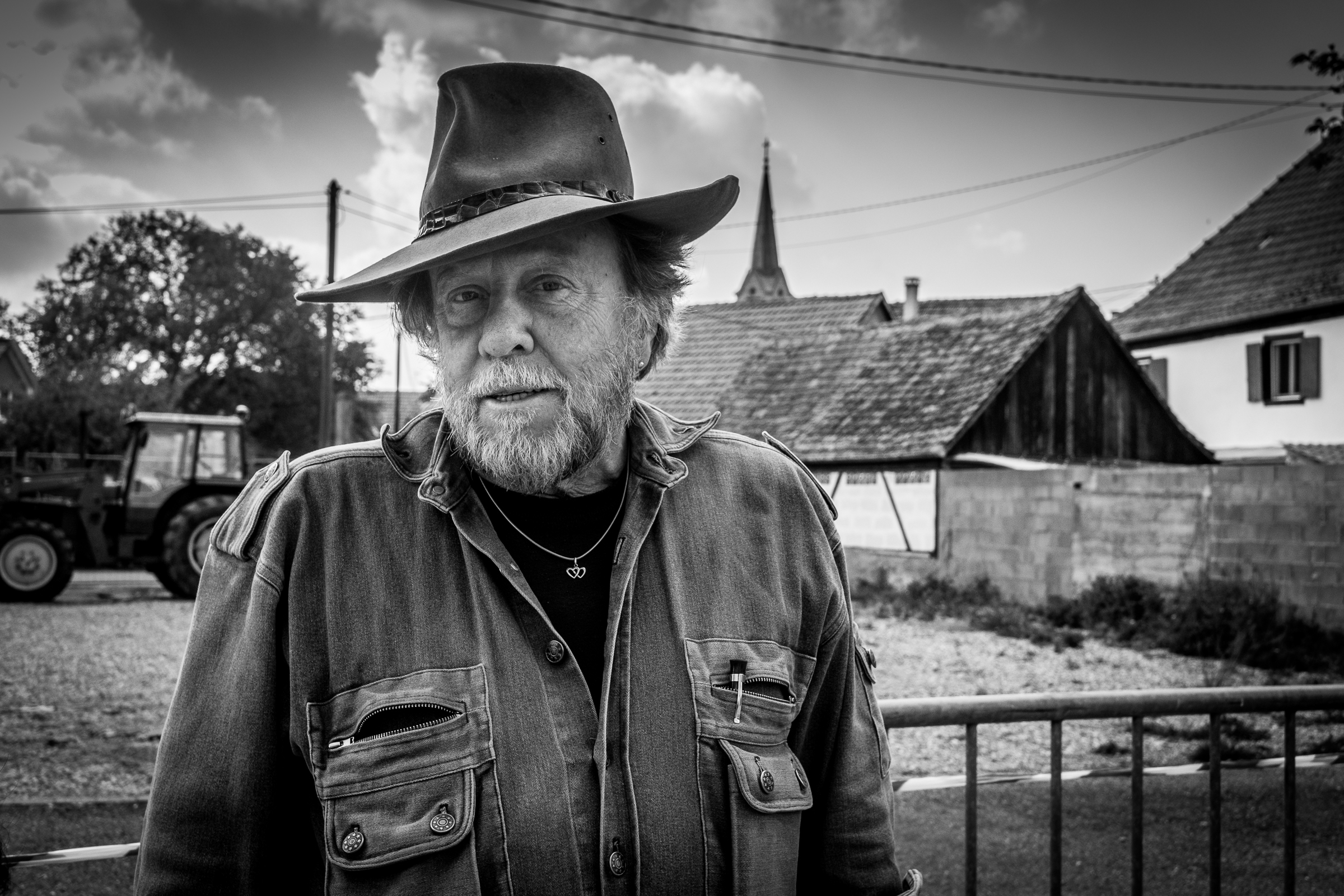
Gunter Demnig (2019)

Demnig installs a Stolperstein in Cologne in 2013

Gunter Demnig (German pronunciation: [ˈɡʊntɐ ˈdɛmnɪç]; born 27 October 1947) is a German artist. He is best known for his Stolperstein ("stumbling block") memorials to the victims of Nazi persecution, including Jews, homosexuals, Romani and disabled people. The project places engraved brass stones in front of a former residence for a Holocaust victim who was deported and murdered by Nazi Germany. The memorial effort began in Germany and has since spread, with more than 100,000 stones placed across 26 countries in Europe.

== Biography ==
Gunter Demnig was born in Berlin. He grew up in Nauen and Berlin and completed high school acquiring his abitur in 1967. Later that year, he began studying creative education at Berlin University of the Arts with Professor Herbert Kaufmann. From 1969 to 1970, he studied industrial design there. In 1971, he transferred to the Kunsthochschule Kassel, resuming his study of creative education and passed the first state examination in 1974.

That same year, he began studying art with Harry Kramer at the University of Kassel. Following that, he spent two years planning, building and managing historical monuments, from 1977 to 1979. From 1980 to 1985, Demnig was an artistic-scientific member on the art faculty at the university of Kassel.

In 1985, he opened his own studio in Cologne and worked on numerous local projects. Since 1994, he has also been involved with the IGNIS-Kulturzentrum (IGNIS Cultural Center).

Demnig's best known work is what he calls Stolpersteine. Stolperstein (in the singular) is the German word for "stumbling block". He began the project in 1996. Demnig's Stolpersteine are small, cobblestone-sized brass memorials for the victims of Nazism. Each stumbling block states "Here lived", followed by a victim's name, birth year, and death year. Set into the pavement of sidewalks in front of the buildings where victims once lived or worked, they call attention both to the individual victim and the scope of the Nazi war crimes. By 2017, about 61,000 Stolpersteine had been laid in 21 countries in Europe, making the project the world's largest memorial.

== Works ==
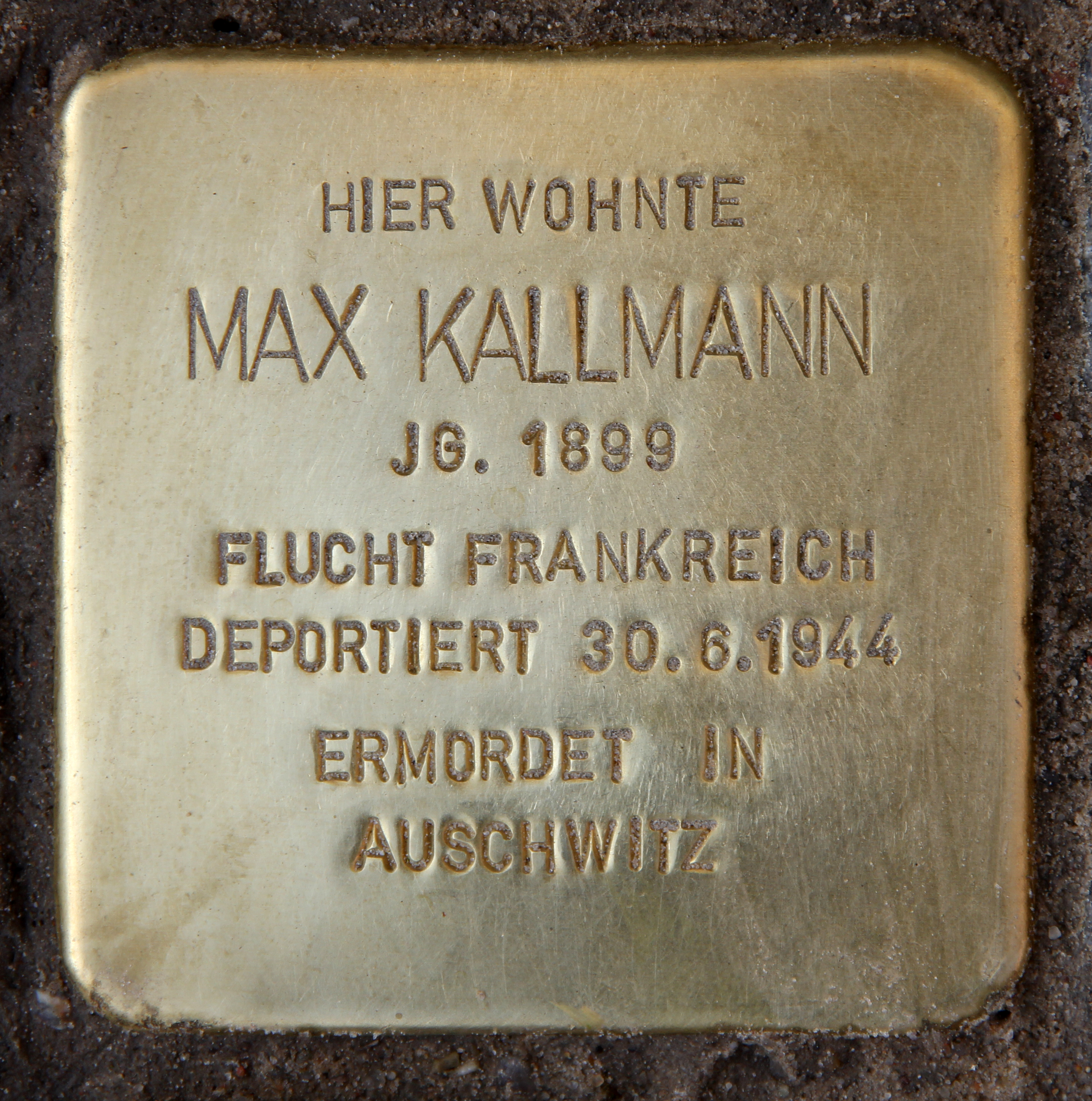
A Stolperstein in Berlin memorializing Max Kallmann. It reads: HERE LIVED Max Kallmann Born 1899 Escaped to France Deported 30 June 1944 Murdered in Auschwitz

- 1980: Odor marks, Cassel-Paris
- 1981: Blood spot, Kassel-London
- 1988: Travel to West Berlin
- 1993: Conceives Stolpersteine project
- 1997: First two Stolpersteine installed at the invitation of Austrian Holocaust Memorial Service founder Andreas Maislinger for the brothers Matthias and Johann Nobis, with legal permit from St. Georgen (near Salzburg)
- 2000: Project Stolpersteine continues, acquiring permits to install the memorials

== Shows ==
- 1982: Alte Oper, Frankfurt am Main
- 1986: Kunsthalle Baden-Baden, Museum of the City of Cologne
- 1991: Kunstlerhaus Bethanien, Berlin
- 1995: Academy of Arts, Berlin

== Stolpersteine in different countries ==
- Austria: Stolpersteine in the district of Braunau am Inn
- Belgium: Stolpersteine in Charleroi
- Czech Republic: Prague: Josefov, Malá Strana, Vršovice and Modřany — Královéhradecký kraj, Ústecký kraj
- Germany: Lake Constance district, Weingarten
- Netherlands: List of Dutch places with Stolpersteine
- Ireland: St Catherine's school, Donore Avenue, Dublin
