= St. Georgen bei Salzburg =

St. Georgen bei Salzburg Sonkt Georng bei Soizburg
- Municipality
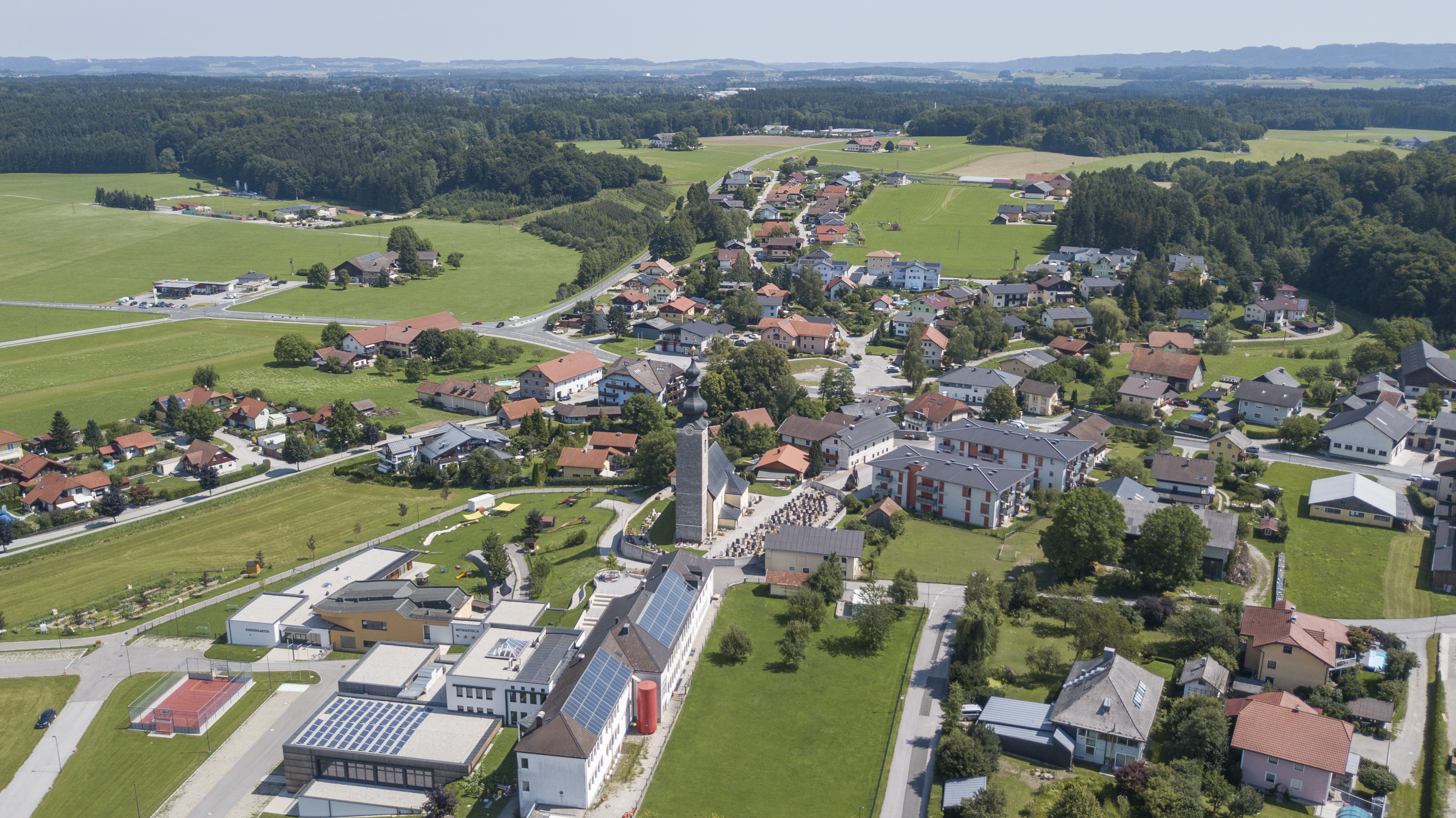

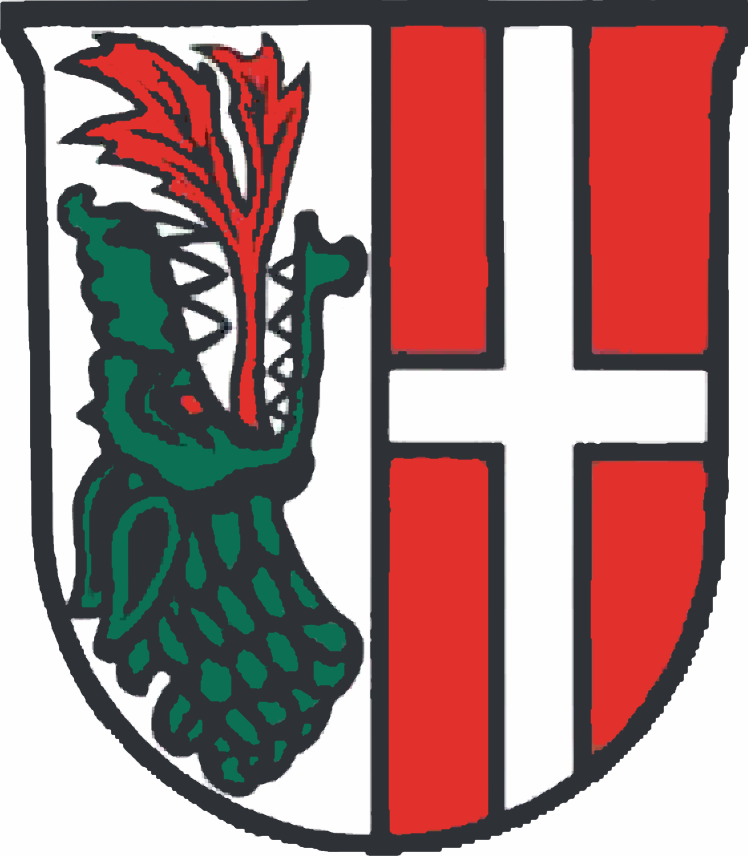
- Coat of arms

- Location within Austria
- Coordinates: 47°59′40″N 12°52′45″E
- Country: Austria
- State: Salzburg
- District: Salzburg-Umgebung

Government
  - Mayor: Franz Gangl (ÖVP)

Area
  - Total: 24.63 km^{2} (9.51 sq mi)
- Elevation: 403 m (1,322 ft)

Population (2018-01-01)
  - Total: 2,954
  - Density: 119.9/km^{2} (310.6/sq mi)
- Time zone: UTC+1 (CET)
  - Summer (DST): UTC+2 (CEST)
- Postal code: 5113
- Area code: 06272
- Vehicle registration: SL
- Website: www.st-georgen.salzburg.at

St. Georgen bei Salzburg (Central Bavarian: Sonkt Georng bei Soizburg) is a municipality in the district of Salzburg-Umgebung in the state of Salzburg in Austria.

== Personalities ==
On July 19, 1997 the artist Gunter Demnig installed two Stolpersteine for Johann Nobis and his brother Matthias Nobis in front of their birth house in Holzhausen at the invitation of Andreas Maislinger, the founder of the Austrian Holocaust Memorial Service, who was born in St. Georgen.
