= Nazi Germany =

German state from 1933 to 1945

German Reich (1933–1943) Deutsches Reich Greater German Reich (1943–1945) Großdeutsches Reich
- 1933–1945
- Flag (1935–1945) Emblem (1935–1945)
- Anthems: "Das Lied der Deutschen" ("The Song of the Germans"); "Horst-Wessel-Lied" (Note: On 12 July 1933, Reichsinnenminister (Reichsminister of the Interior) Wilhelm Frick ordered that the Horst-Wessel-Lied be played right after the standing national anthem "Das Lied der Deutschen", better known as Deutschland Über Alles. Tümmler 2010, p. 63.) ("Horst Wessel Song")
- Germany's territorial control at its greatest extent during World War II (late 1942): German Reich (Note: Including the Protectorate of Bohemia and Moravia and the General Government); Civilian-administered occupied territories; Military-administered occupied territories; Nazi Party administrative divisions of the Greater German Reich (red line is border), 1944
- Capital and largest city: Berlin; 52°30′40″N 13°22′47″E
- Common languages: German
- Religion: 94% Christianity; 54% Protestant; 40% Catholic; 3.5% Gottgläubige; 1.5% irreligious; 1% other
- Demonym: German
- Government: Unitary fascist state
- Head of state
  - 1933–1934: Paul von Hindenburg (Note: as President)
  - 1934–1945: Adolf Hitler (Note: as Führer und Reichskanzler)
  - 1945: Karl Dönitz
- Chancellor
  - 1933–1945: Adolf Hitler
  - 1945: Joseph Goebbels (Note: De jure from 30 April until 1 May.)
  - 1945: Lutz von Krosigk (Note: De jure from 2 May until 23 May.)
- Legislature: Reichstag
  - Upper house: Reichsrat (dissolved 1934)
- Historical era: Interwar; World War II
  - Seizure of power: 30 January 1933
  - Enabling Act: 23 March 1933
  - Nuremberg Laws: 15 September 1935
  - Anschluss: 12/13 March 1938 (Note: De facto on 12 March with the entry of German troops; de jure on 13 March by laws passed)
  - Invasion of Poland: 1 September 1939
  - Death of Hitler: 30 April 1945
  - Fall of Berlin: 2 May 1945
  - Surrender: 8 May 1945
  - Flensburg Government arrested: 23 May 1945
  - Berlin Declaration: 5 June 1945

Area
- 1939 (Note: In 1939, before Germany acquired control of the last two regions which had been in its control before the Versailles Treaty—Alsace-Lorraine, Danzig and the Polish Corridor—its area was 633,786 km^{2} (244,706 sq mi). See Statistisches Jahrbuch 2006.): 633,786 km^{2} (244,706 sq mi)
- 1940: 823,505 km^{2} (317,957 sq mi)

Population
  - 1939: 79,375,281
  - 1940: 109,518,183
- Currency: Reichsmark (ℛℳ)

Nazi Germany, (Note: German: Nationalsozialistischer Staat (lit. 'National Socialist State'), NS-Staat (lit. 'Nazi State') for short; also Nationalsozialistisches Deutschland (lit. 'National Socialist Germany')) officially the German Reich (Note: German: Deutsches Reich) and later the Greater German Reich, (Note: German: Großdeutsches Reich – this latter term was the official name used by the Nazis to describe their expanded political state.) was the German state between 1933 and 1945, when Adolf Hitler and the Nazi Party controlled the country, transforming it into a totalitarian dictatorship. The Third Reich, (Note: German: Drittes Reich) meaning "Third Realm" or "Third Empire", was the Nazi claim that Nazi Germany was the successor to the Holy Roman Empire (800–1806) and the German Empire (1871–1918); the Nazis called it the Thousand-Year Reich, (Note: German: Tausendjähriges Reich) but it ended just 12 years later in May 1945, when the Allies defeated Germany and entered Berlin, ending World War II in Europe.

After Hitler was appointed Chancellor of Germany in 1933, the Nazi Party began to eliminate political opposition and consolidate power. A 1934 referendum confirmed Hitler as sole Führer (leader). Power was centralised in Hitler's person, and his word became the highest law. The government was not a coordinated, cooperating body, but rather a collection of factions struggling to amass power. To address the Great Depression, the Nazis used heavy military spending, extensive public works projects, including the Autobahnen (motorways), and a massive secret rearmament programme, forming the Wehrmacht (armed forces), all financed by deficit spending. The return to economic stability and end of mass unemployment boosted the regime's popularity. Hitler made increasingly aggressive territorial demands, seizing Austria in the Anschluss of 1938 and the Sudetenland region of Czechoslovakia. Germany signed a non-aggression pact with the Soviet Union and invaded Poland in 1939, launching World War II in Europe. In alliance with Fascist Italy and other Axis powers, Germany conquered most of Europe by 1940, but failed to subdue Britain.

Racism, Nazi eugenics, anti-Slavism, and especially antisemitism were central ideological features of the regime. The Nazis considered Germanic peoples to be the "master race", the purest branch of the Aryan race. Jews, Slavs, Romani people, homosexuals, liberals, socialists, communists, other political opponents, Jehovah's Witnesses, Freemasons, those who refused to work and other "undesirables" were imprisoned, deported or murdered. Christian churches and citizens that opposed Hitler's rule were oppressed and opposition leaders were imprisoned. Education focused on racial biology, population policy and fitness for military service. Career and educational opportunities for women were curtailed. The Nazi Propaganda Ministry disseminated films and antisemitic canards, and organised mass rallies, fostering a pervasive cult of personality around Hitler to influence public opinion. The government controlled artistic expression, promoting specific art forms and banning or discouraging others. Genocide, mass murder and large-scale forced labour became hallmarks of the regime; the implementation of its racial policies culminated in the Holocaust.

After invading the Soviet Union in 1941, Nazi Germany implemented the Generalplan Ost and Hunger Plan, as part of its war of extermination in Eastern Europe. The Soviet resurgence and entry of the United States into the war meant Germany lost the initiative in 1943, and by late 1944, had been pushed back to the 1939 border. Large-scale aerial bombing of Germany escalated, and the Axis powers were driven back in Eastern and Southern Europe. Germany was conquered by the Soviet Union from the east and the other allies from the west, and capitulated in 1945. Hitler's refusal to admit defeat led to massive destruction of German infrastructure and additional war-related deaths in the closing months of the war. The Allies subsequently initiated a policy of denazification and put many of the surviving Nazi leadership on trial for war crimes at the Nuremberg trials.

== Name ==
Common English terms for the German state in the Nazi era are "Nazi Germany" and the "Third Reich", which Hitler and the Nazis also referred to as the "Thousand-Year Reich" (Tausendjähriges Reich). The latter, a translation of the Nazi propaganda term Drittes Reich, was first used in Das Dritte Reich, a 1923 book by Arthur Moeller van den Bruck. The book counted the Holy Roman Empire as the first Reich and the German Empire as the second.

== Background ==
Severe setbacks to the German economy began after World War I ended, partly because of reparations payments required under the 1919 Treaty of Versailles. The government printed money to make the payments and to repay the country's war debt, but the resulting hyperinflation led to inflated prices, economic chaos, and food riots. When the government defaulted on their reparations payments in January 1923, French troops occupied German industrial areas along the Ruhr and widespread civil unrest followed.

The National Socialist German Workers' Party, commonly known as the Nazi Party, was founded in 1920. The Nazi party platform included destruction of the Weimar Republic, rejection of the Treaty of Versailles, radical antisemitism, and anti-Bolshevism. They promised a strong central government, increased Lebensraum ("living space") for Germanic peoples, formation of a national community based on race, and racial cleansing via the active suppression of Jews, who would be stripped of their citizenship and civil rights. The Nazis proposed national and cultural renewal based upon the Völkisch movement. The party, especially its paramilitary organisation Sturmabteilung (SA; Storm Detachment), or Brownshirts, used physical violence to advance their political position, disrupting the meetings of rival organisations and attacking their members as well as Jewish people on the streets. Such far-right armed groups were common in Bavaria, and were tolerated by the sympathetic far-right state government of Gustav Ritter von Kahr.

When the stock market in the United States crashed in 1929, the effect in Germany was dire. Millions were thrown out of work and several major banks collapsed. Hitler and the Nazis prepared to take advantage of the emergency to gain support for their party. They promised to strengthen the economy and provide jobs. Many voters decided the Nazi Party was capable of restoring order, quelling civil unrest, and improving Germany's international reputation. After the federal election of 1932, the party was the largest in the Reichstag, holding 230 seats with 37.4 per cent of the popular vote.

== History ==
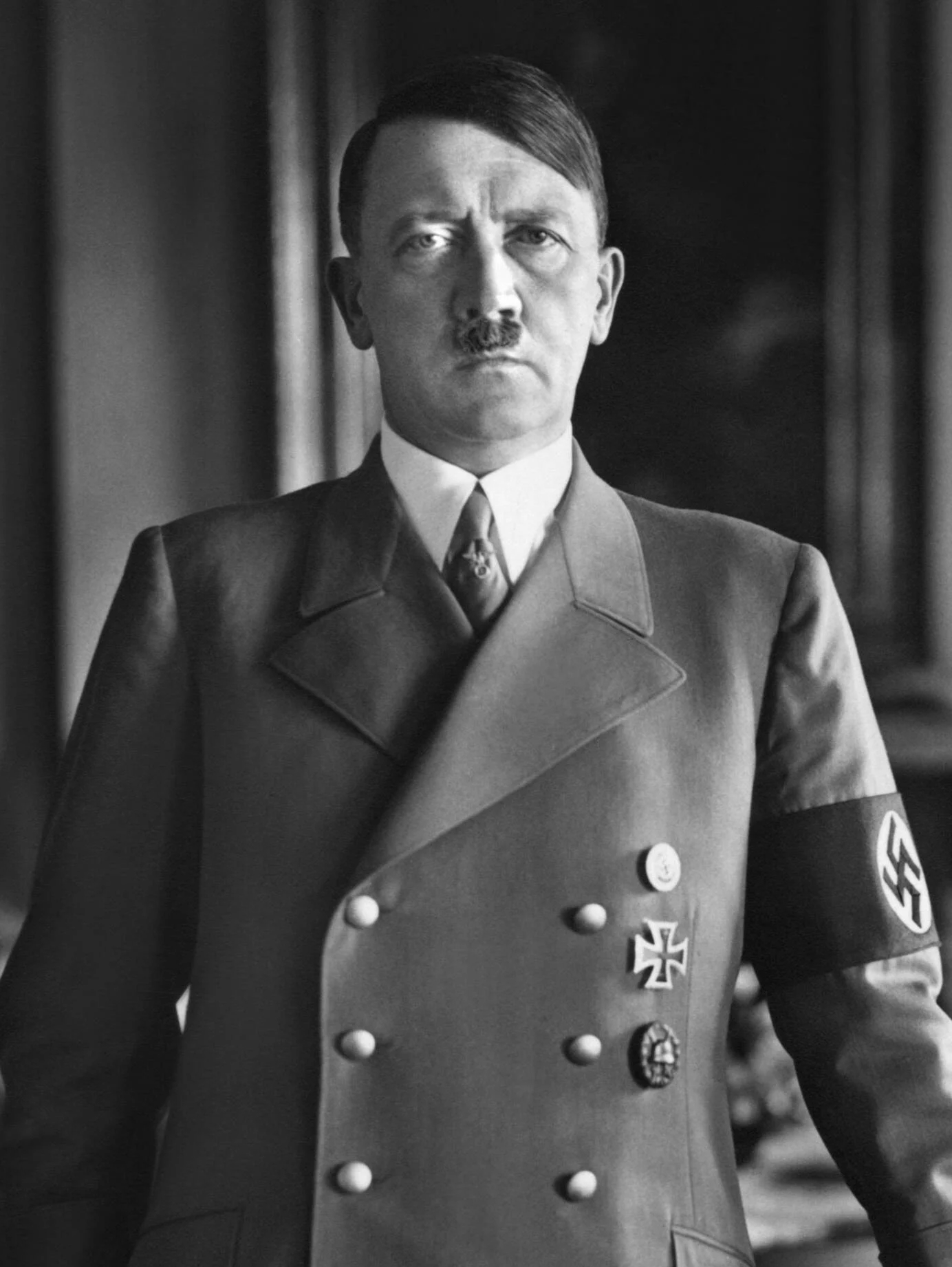
Adolf Hitler became Germany's head of state, with the title of Führer und Reichskanzler in 1934.

=== Nazi seizure of power ===
Although the Nazis won the greatest share of the popular vote in the two Reichstag general elections of 1932, they did not have a majority. Hitler refused to participate in a coalition government unless he was its leader. Under pressure from politicians, industrialists, and the business community, President Paul von Hindenburg reluctantly appointed Hitler Chancellor of Germany on 30 January 1933. This event is known as the Machtergreifung ("seizure of power").

On the night of 27 February 1933, the Reichstag building was set afire. A Dutch communist named Marinus van der Lubbe was found guilty of starting the blaze. Hitler proclaimed that the arson marked the start of a communist uprising. The Reichstag Fire Decree, imposed on 28 February 1933, rescinded most civil liberties, including rights of assembly and freedom of the press. The decree also allowed the police to detain people indefinitely without charges. The legislation was accompanied by a propaganda campaign that led to public support for the measure. Violent suppression of communists by the SA was undertaken nationwide and 4,000 members of the Communist Party of Germany were arrested.

On 23 March 1933, the Enabling Act, an amendment to the Weimar Constitution, passed in the Reichstag by a vote of 444 to 94. This amendment allowed Hitler and his cabinet to pass laws—even laws that violated the constitution—without the consent of the president or the Reichstag. As the bill required a two-thirds majority to pass, the Nazis used intimidation tactics as well as the provisions of the Reichstag Fire Decree to keep several Social Democratic deputies from attending, and the Communists had already been banned. The Enabling Act would subsequently serve as the legal foundation for the dictatorship the Nazis established.

On 10 May the government seized the assets of the Social Democrats, and they were banned on 22 June. On 21 June the SA raided the offices of the German National People's Party – their former coalition partners – which then disbanded on 29 June. The remaining major political parties followed suit. On 14 July 1933 Germany became a one-party state with the passage of the Law Against the Formation of Parties, decreeing the Nazi Party to be the sole legal party in Germany. The founding of new parties was also made illegal, and all remaining political parties which had not already been dissolved were banned. Further elections in November 1933, 1936 and 1938 were Nazi-controlled, with only members of the Party and a small number of independents elected.

All civilian organisations had their leadership replaced with Nazi sympathisers or party members, and either merged with the Nazi Party or faced dissolution. The Nazi government declared a "Day of National Labour" for May Day 1933, and invited many trade union delegates to Berlin for celebrations. The day after, SA stormtroopers demolished union offices around the country; all trade unions were forced to dissolve and their leaders were arrested. The Law for the Restoration of the Professional Civil Service, passed in April, removed from their jobs all teachers, professors, judges, magistrates, and government officials who were Jewish or whose commitment to the party was suspect. This meant the only non-political institutions not under control of the Nazis were the churches.

The Nazi regime abolished the symbols of the Weimar Republic, including the black, red, and gold tricolour flag—and adopted reworked symbolism. The previous imperial black, white, and red tricolour was restored as one of Germany's two official flags; the second was the swastika flag of the Nazi Party, which became the sole national flag in September 1935. The party anthem "Horst-Wessel-Lied" ("Horst Wessel Song") became a second national anthem.

Germany was still in a dire economic situation, as six million people were unemployed and the balance of trade deficit was daunting. Using deficit spending, public works projects were undertaken beginning in 1934, creating 1.7 million new jobs by the end of that year alone. Average wages began to rise.

=== Consolidation of power ===
The SA leadership continued to apply pressure for greater political and military power. In response, Hitler used the Schutzstaffel (SS) and the Gestapo—the secret police—to purge the entire SA leadership. Hitler targeted SA Stabschef (Chief of Staff) Ernst Röhm and other SA leaders who—along with a number of Hitler's political adversaries (such as Gregor Strasser and the former chancellor Kurt von Schleicher)—were arrested and shot. Up to 200 people were killed from 30 June to 2 July 1934 in an event that became known as the Night of the Long Knives.

On 2 August 1934, Hindenburg died. The previous day, the cabinet had enacted the "Law Concerning the Head of State of the German Reich", which stated that upon Hindenburg's death the office of Reich President would be abolished and its powers merged with those of Reich Chancellor. Hitler thus became head of state as well as head of government and was formally named Führer und Reichskanzler ("Leader and Chancellor"), although eventually Reichskanzler was dropped. Germany was now a totalitarian state with Hitler at its head. As head of state, Hitler became Supreme Commander of the armed forces. The new law provided an altered loyalty oath for servicemen so that they affirmed loyalty to Hitler personally rather than the office of supreme commander or the state. On 19 August the merger of the presidency with the chancellorship was approved by 90 per cent of the electorate in a plebiscite.

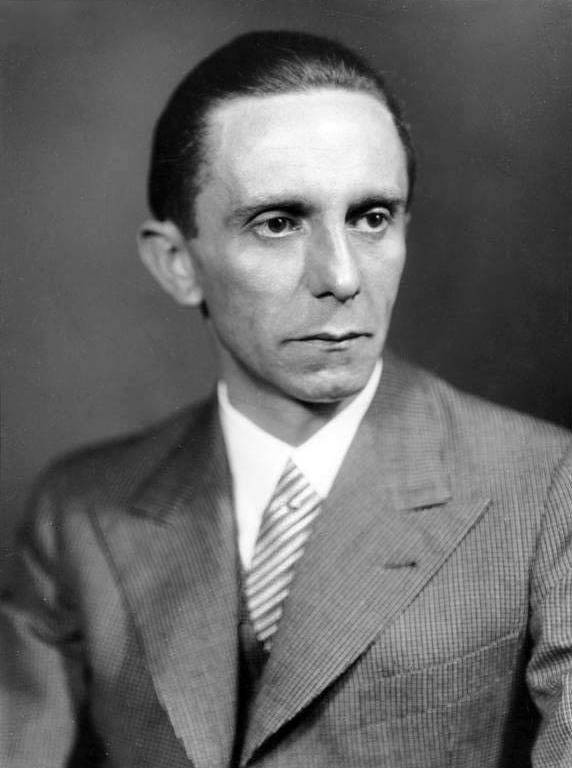
Joseph Goebbels, Reich Minister of Public Enlightenment and Propaganda

Most Germans were relieved that the conflicts and street fighting of the Weimar era had ended. They were deluged with propaganda orchestrated by the Minister of Public Enlightenment and Propaganda, Joseph Goebbels, who promised peace and plenty for all in a united, Marxist-free country without the constraints of the Treaty of Versailles. The Nazi Party obtained and legitimised power through its initial revolutionary activities, then through manipulation of legal mechanisms, the use of police powers, and by taking control of the state and federal institutions. The first major Nazi concentration camp, initially for political prisoners, was opened at Dachau in 1933. Hundreds of camps of varying size and function were created by the end of the war.

Beginning in April 1933, scores of measures defining the status of Jews and their rights were instituted. These measures culminated in the establishment of the Nuremberg Laws of 1935, which stripped them of their basic rights. The Nazis would take from the Jews their wealth, their right to intermarry with non-Jews, and their right to occupy many fields of labour (such as law, medicine, or education). Eventually the Nazis declared the Jews as undesirable to remain among German citizens and society.

=== Military build-up ===
As early as February 1933, Hitler announced that rearmament must begin, albeit clandestinely at first, as to do so was in violation of the Versailles Treaty. On 17 May 1933 Hitler gave a speech before the Reichstag outlining his desire for world peace and accepted an offer from American President Franklin D. Roosevelt for military disarmament, provided the other nations of Europe did the same. When the other European powers failed to accept this offer, Hitler pulled Germany out of the World Disarmament Conference and the League of Nations in October, claiming its disarmament clauses were unfair if they applied only to Germany. In a referendum held in November, 95 per cent of voters supported Germany's withdrawal.

In 1934 Hitler told his military leaders that rearmament needed to be complete by 1942, as by then the German people would require more living space and resources, so Germany would have to start a war of conquest to obtain more territory. The Saarland, which had been placed under League of Nations supervision for 15 years at the end of World War I, voted in January 1935 to become part of Germany. In March 1935, Hitler announced the creation of an air force, and that the Reichswehr would be increased to 550,000 men. Britain agreed to Germany building a naval fleet with the signing of the Anglo-German Naval Agreement on 18 June 1935.

When the Italian invasion of Ethiopia led to only mild protests by the British and French governments, on 7 March 1936 Hitler used the Franco-Soviet Treaty of Mutual Assistance as a pretext to order the army to march 3,000 troops into the demilitarised zone in the Rhineland in violation of the Versailles Treaty. As the territory was part of Germany, the British and French governments did not feel that attempting to enforce the treaty was worth the risk of war. In the one-party election held on 29 March, the Nazis received 98.9 per cent support. In 1936 Hitler signed an Anti-Comintern Pact with the Empire of Japan and a non-aggression agreement with the dictator of Fascist Italy, Benito Mussolini, who was soon referring to a "Rome-Berlin Axis".

Hitler sent military supplies and assistance to the Nationalist forces of General Francisco Franco in the Spanish Civil War, which began in July 1936. The German Condor Legion included a range of aircraft and their crews, as well as a tank contingent. The aircraft of the Legion destroyed the city of Guernica in 1937. The Nationalists were victorious in 1939 and became an informal ally of Nazi Germany.

==== Austria and Czechoslovakia ====
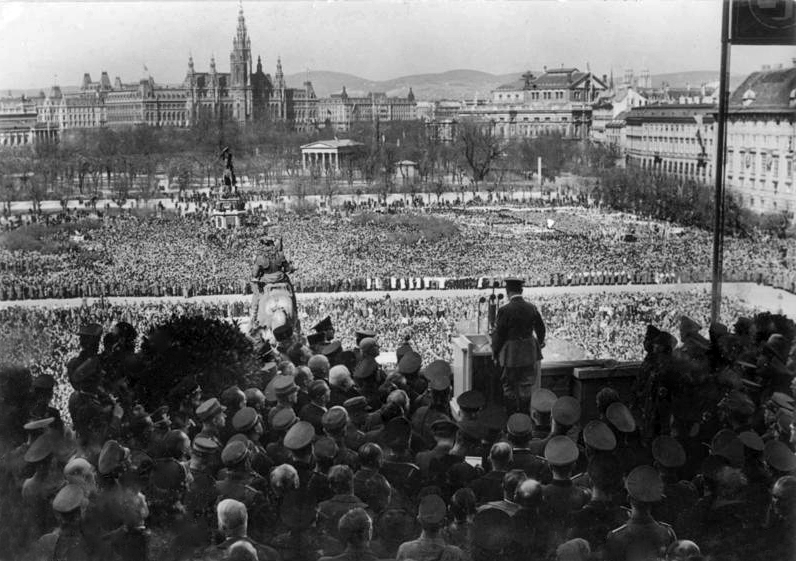
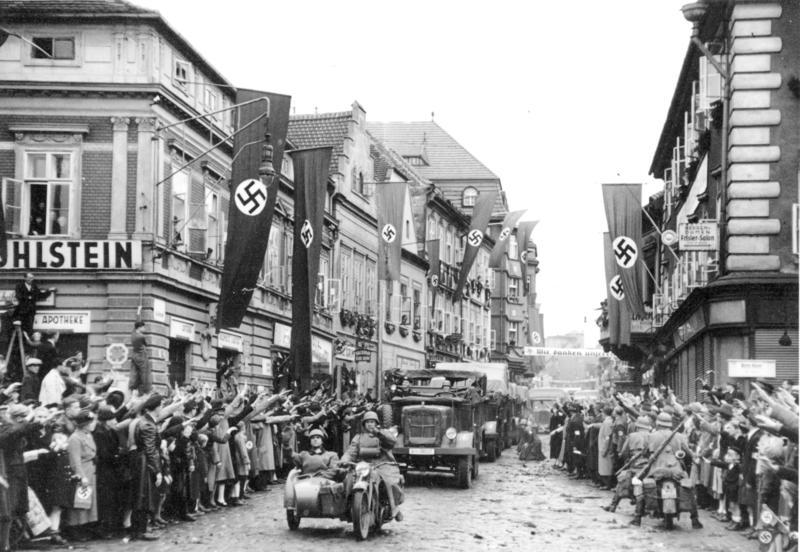
(Top) Hitler proclaims the Anschluss on the Heldenplatz, Vienna, 15 March 1938.
(Bottom) Ethnic Germans use the Nazi salute to greet German soldiers as they enter Saaz, 1938.

In February 1938, Hitler emphasised to Austrian Chancellor Kurt Schuschnigg the need for Germany to secure its frontiers. Schuschnigg scheduled a plebiscite regarding Austrian independence for 13 March, but Hitler sent an ultimatum to Schuschnigg on 11 March demanding that he hand over all power to the Austrian Nazi Party or face an invasion. German troops entered Austria the next day, to be greeted with enthusiasm by the populace.

The Republic of Czechoslovakia was home to a substantial minority of Germans, who lived mostly in the Sudetenland. Under pressure from separatist groups within the Sudeten German Party, the Czechoslovak government offered economic concessions to the region. Hitler decided not just to incorporate the Sudetenland into the Reich, but to destroy the country of Czechoslovakia entirely. The Nazis undertook a propaganda campaign to try to generate support for an invasion. Top German military leaders opposed the plan, as Germany was not yet ready for war.

The crisis led to war preparations by Britain, Czechoslovakia, and France (Czechoslovakia's ally). Attempting to avoid war, British Prime Minister Neville Chamberlain arranged a series of meetings, the result of which was the Munich Agreement, signed on 29 September 1938. The Czechoslovak government was forced to accept the Sudetenland's annexation into Germany. Chamberlain was greeted with cheers when he landed in London, saying the agreement brought "peace for our time".

Austrian and Czech foreign exchange reserves were seized by the Nazis, as were stockpiles of raw materials such as metals and completed goods such as weaponry and aircraft, which were shipped to Germany. The Reichswerke Hermann Göring industrial conglomerate took control of steel and coal production facilities in both countries.

==== Poland ====
In January 1934, Germany signed a non-aggression pact with Poland. In March 1939 Hitler demanded the return of the Free City of Danzig and the Polish Corridor, a strip of land that separated East Prussia from the rest of Germany. The British announced they would come to the aid of Poland if it was attacked. Hitler, believing the British would not take action, ordered an invasion plan should be readied for September 1939. On 23 May, Hitler described to his generals his overall plan of not only seizing the Polish Corridor but greatly expanding German territory eastward at the expense of Poland. He expected this time they would be met by force.

The Germans reaffirmed their alliance with Italy and signed non-aggression pacts with Denmark, Estonia, and Latvia whilst trade links were formalised with Romania, Norway, and Sweden. Foreign Minister Joachim von Ribbentrop arranged in negotiations with the Soviet Union a non-aggression pact, the Molotov–Ribbentrop Pact, signed in August 1939. The treaty also contained secret protocols dividing Poland and the Baltic states into German and Soviet spheres of influence.

=== World War II ===
(Top) Animated map showing the sequence of events in Europe throughout World War II
(Bottom) Germany and its allies at the height of Axis success, 1942

==== Foreign policy ====
Germany's wartime foreign policy involved the creation of allied governments controlled directly or indirectly from Berlin. They intended to obtain soldiers from allies such as Italy and Hungary and workers and food supplies from allies such as Vichy France. Hungary was the fourth nation to join the Axis, signing the Tripartite Pact on 27 September 1940. Bulgaria signed the pact on 17 November. German efforts to secure oil included negotiating a supply from their new ally, Romania, who signed the Pact on 23 November, alongside the Slovak Republic. By late 1942 there were 24 divisions from Romania on the Eastern Front, 10 from Italy, and 10 from Hungary. Germany assumed full control in France in 1942, Italy in 1943, and Hungary in 1944. Although Japan was a powerful ally, the relationship was distant, with little co-ordination or co-operation. For example, Germany refused to share their formula for synthetic oil from coal until late in the war.

==== Outbreak of war ====
Germany invaded Poland and captured the Free City of Danzig on 1 September 1939, beginning World War II in Europe. Honouring their treaty obligations, Britain and France declared war on Germany two days later. Poland fell quickly, as the Soviet Union attacked from the east on 17 September. Reinhard Heydrich, chief of the Sicherheitspolizei (SiPo; Security Police) and Sicherheitsdienst (SD; Security Service), ordered on 21 September that Polish Jews should be rounded up and concentrated into cities with good rail links. Initially the intention was to deport them farther east, or possibly to Madagascar. Using lists prepared in advance, some 65,000 Polish intelligentsia, noblemen, clergy, and teachers were murdered by the end of 1939 in an attempt to destroy Poland's identity as a nation. Soviet forces advanced into Finland in the Winter War, and German forces saw action at sea. But little other activity occurred until May, so the period became known as the "Phoney War".

From the start of the war, a British blockade on shipments to Germany affected its economy. Germany was particularly dependent on foreign supplies of oil, coal, and grain. Thanks to trade embargoes and the blockade, imports into Germany declined by 80 per cent. To safeguard Swedish iron ore shipments to Germany, Hitler ordered the invasion of Denmark and Norway, which began on 9 April. Denmark fell after less than a day, while most of Norway followed by the end of the month. By early June, Germany occupied all of Norway.

==== Conquest of Europe ====
Against the advice of many of his senior military officers, in May 1940 Hitler ordered an attack on France and the Low Countries. They quickly conquered Luxembourg and the Netherlands and outmanoeuvred the Allies in Belgium, forcing the evacuation of many British and French troops at Dunkirk. France fell as well, surrendering to Germany on 22 June. The victory in France resulted in an upswing in Hitler's popularity and an upsurge in war fever in Germany.

In violation of the provisions of the Hague Convention, industrial firms in the Netherlands, France, and Belgium were put to work producing war materiel for Germany.

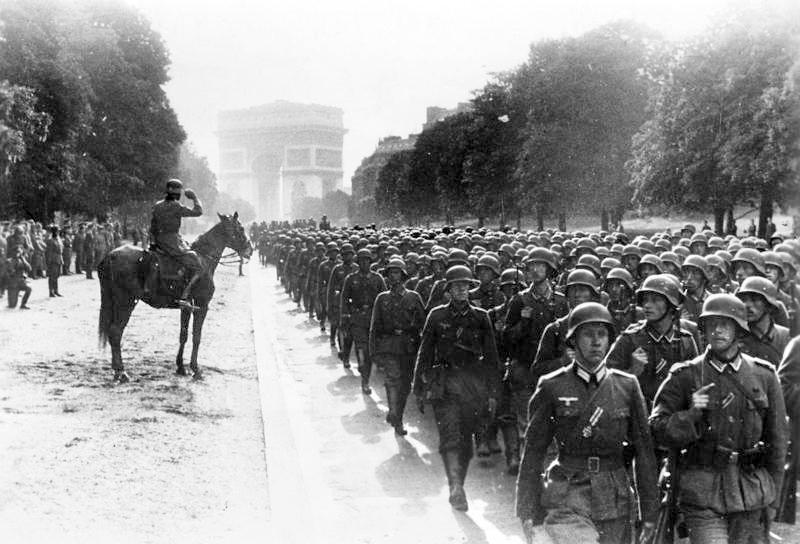
German soldiers march near the Arc de Triomphe in Paris, 14 June 1940

The Nazis seized from the French thousands of locomotives and rolling stock, stockpiles of weapons, and raw materials such as copper, tin, oil, and nickel. Payments for occupation costs were levied upon France, Belgium, and Norway. Barriers to trade led to hoarding, black markets, and uncertainty about the future. Food supplies were precarious; production dropped in most of Europe. Famine was experienced in many occupied countries.

Hitler's peace overtures to the new British Prime Minister Winston Churchill were rejected in July 1940. Grand Admiral Erich Raeder had advised Hitler in June that air superiority was a pre-condition for a successful invasion of Britain, so Hitler ordered a series of aerial attacks on Royal Air Force (RAF) airbases and radar stations, as well as nightly air raids on British cities, including London, Plymouth, and Coventry. The German Luftwaffe failed to defeat the RAF in what became known as the Battle of Britain, and by the end of October, Hitler realised that air superiority would not be achieved. He permanently postponed the invasion, a plan which the commanders of the German army had never taken entirely seriously. (Note: According to Raeder, "Our Air Force could not be counted on to guard our transports from the British Fleets, because their operations would depend on the weather, if for no other reason. It could not be expected that even for a brief period our Air Force could make up for our lack of naval supremacy." Raeder 2001, pp. 324–325. Grand Admiral Karl Dönitz believed air superiority was not enough and admitted, "We possessed neither control of the air or the sea; nor were we in any position to gain it." Dönitz 2012, p. 114.) Several historians, including Andrew Gordon, believe the primary reason for the failure of the invasion plan was the superiority of the Royal Navy, not the actions of the RAF.

In February 1941 the German Afrika Korps arrived in Libya to aid the Italians in the North African Campaign. On 6 April Germany launched an invasion of Yugoslavia and Greece. All of Yugoslavia and parts of Greece were subsequently divided between Germany, Hungary, Italy, and Bulgaria.

==== Invasion of the Soviet Union ====
On 22 June 1941, contravening the Molotov–Ribbentrop Pact, about 3.8 million Axis troops attacked the Soviet Union. In addition to Hitler's stated purpose of acquiring Lebensraum, this large-scale offensive—codenamed Operation Barbarossa—was intended to destroy the Soviet Union and seize its natural resources for subsequent aggression against the Western powers. The reaction among Germans was one of surprise and trepidation as many were concerned about how much longer the war would continue or suspected that Germany could not win a war fought on two fronts.

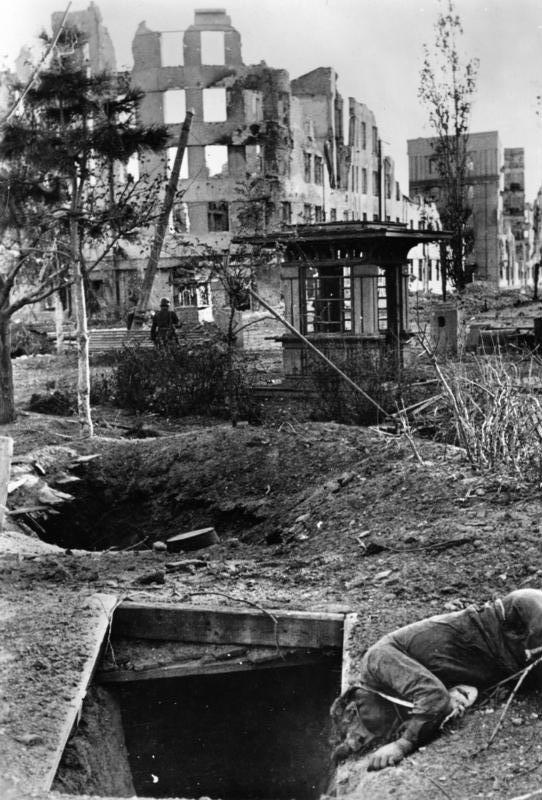
Death and destruction during the Battle of Stalingrad, October 1942

The invasion conquered a huge area, including the Baltic states, Belarus, and west Ukraine. After the successful Battle of Smolensk in September 1941, Hitler ordered Army Group Centre to halt its advance to Moscow and temporarily divert its Panzer groups to aid in the encirclement of Leningrad and Kiev. This pause provided the Red Army with an opportunity to mobilise fresh reserves. The Moscow offensive, which resumed in October 1941, ended disastrously in December. On 7 December 1941 Japan attacked Pearl Harbor, Hawaii. Four days later, Germany declared war on the United States.

Food was in short supply in the conquered areas of the Soviet Union and Poland, as the retreating armies had burned the crops in some areas, and much of the remainder was sent back to the Reich. In Germany, rations were cut in 1942. In his role as Plenipotentiary of the Four Year Plan, Hermann Göring demanded increased shipments of grain from France and fish from Norway. The 1942 harvest was good, and food supplies remained adequate in Western Europe.

Germany and Europe as a whole were almost totally dependent on foreign oil imports. In an attempt to resolve the shortage, in June 1942 Germany launched Fall Blau ("Case Blue"), an offensive against the Caucasian oilfields. The Red Army launched a counter-offensive on 19 November and encircled the Axis forces, who were trapped in Stalingrad on 23 November. Göring assured Hitler that the 6th Army could be supplied by air, but this turned out to be infeasible. Hitler's refusal to allow a retreat led to the deaths of 200,000 German and Romanian soldiers; of the 91,000 men who surrendered in the city on 31 January 1943, only 6,000 survivors returned to Germany after the war.

==== Turning point and collapse ====
Losses continued to mount after Stalingrad, leading to a sharp reduction in the popularity of the Nazi Party and deteriorating morale. Soviet forces continued to push westward after the failed German offensive at the Battle of Kursk in the summer of 1943. By the end of 1943, the Germans had lost most of their eastern territorial gains. In Egypt, Field Marshal Erwin Rommel's Afrika Korps were defeated by British forces under Field Marshal Bernard Montgomery in October 1942. The Allies landed in Sicily in July 1943 and were on the Italian peninsula by September. Meanwhile, American and British bomber fleets based in Britain began operations against Germany. Many sorties were intentionally given civilian targets in an effort to destroy German morale. The bombing of aircraft factories as well as Peenemünde Army Research Centre, where V-1 and V-2 rockets were being developed and produced, were also deemed particularly important. German aircraft production could not keep pace with losses, and without air cover the Allied bombing campaign became even more devastating. By targeting oil refineries and factories, they crippled the German war effort by late 1944.

On 6 June 1944, American, British, and Canadian forces established a front in France with the D-Day landings in Normandy. On 20 July 1944, Hitler survived an assassination attempt. He ordered brutal reprisals, resulting in 7,000 arrests and the execution of more than 4,900 people. The failed Ardennes Offensive (16 December 1944 – 25 January 1945) was the last major German offensive on the western front, and Soviet forces entered Germany on 27 January. Hitler's refusal to admit defeat and his insistence that the war be fought to the last man led to unnecessary death and destruction in the war's closing months. Through his Justice Minister Otto Georg Thierack, Hitler ordered that anyone who was not prepared to fight should be court-martialed, and thousands of people were executed. In many areas, people surrendered to the approaching Allies in spite of exhortations of local leaders to continue to fight. Hitler ordered the destruction of transport, bridges, industries, and other infrastructure—a scorched earth decree—but Armaments Minister Albert Speer prevented this order from being fully carried out.

U.S. Army Air Force film of the aftermath of the destruction in central Berlin in July 1945

During the Battle of Berlin (16 April – 2 May 1945), Hitler and his staff lived in the underground Führerbunker while the Red Army approached. On 30 April, when Soviet troops were within two blocks of the Reich Chancellery, Hitler and his wife, Eva Braun, committed suicide. On 2 May, General Helmuth Weidling unconditionally surrendered Berlin to Soviet General Vasily Chuikov. Hitler was succeeded by Grand Admiral Karl Dönitz as Reich President and Goebbels as Reich Chancellor. Goebbels and his wife Magda committed suicide the next day after murdering their six children. Between 4 and 8 May 1945, most of the remaining German armed forces unconditionally surrendered. The German Instrument of Surrender was signed 8 May, marking the end of the Nazi regime and the end of World War II in Europe.

Popular support for Hitler almost completely disappeared as the war drew to a close. Suicide rates in Germany increased, particularly in areas where the Red Army was advancing. Among soldiers and party personnel, suicide was often deemed an honourable and heroic alternative to surrender. First-hand accounts and propaganda about the uncivilised behaviour of the advancing Soviet troops caused panic among civilians on the Eastern Front, especially women, who feared being raped. More than a thousand people (out of a population of around 16,000) committed suicide in Demmin around 1 May 1945 as the 65th Army of 2nd Belorussian Front first broke into a distillery and then rampaged through the town, committing mass rapes, arbitrarily executing civilians, and setting fire to buildings. High numbers of suicides took place in many other locations, including Neubrandenburg (600 dead), Stolp in Pommern (1,000 dead), and Berlin, where at least 7,057 people committed suicide in 1945.

==== German casualties ====
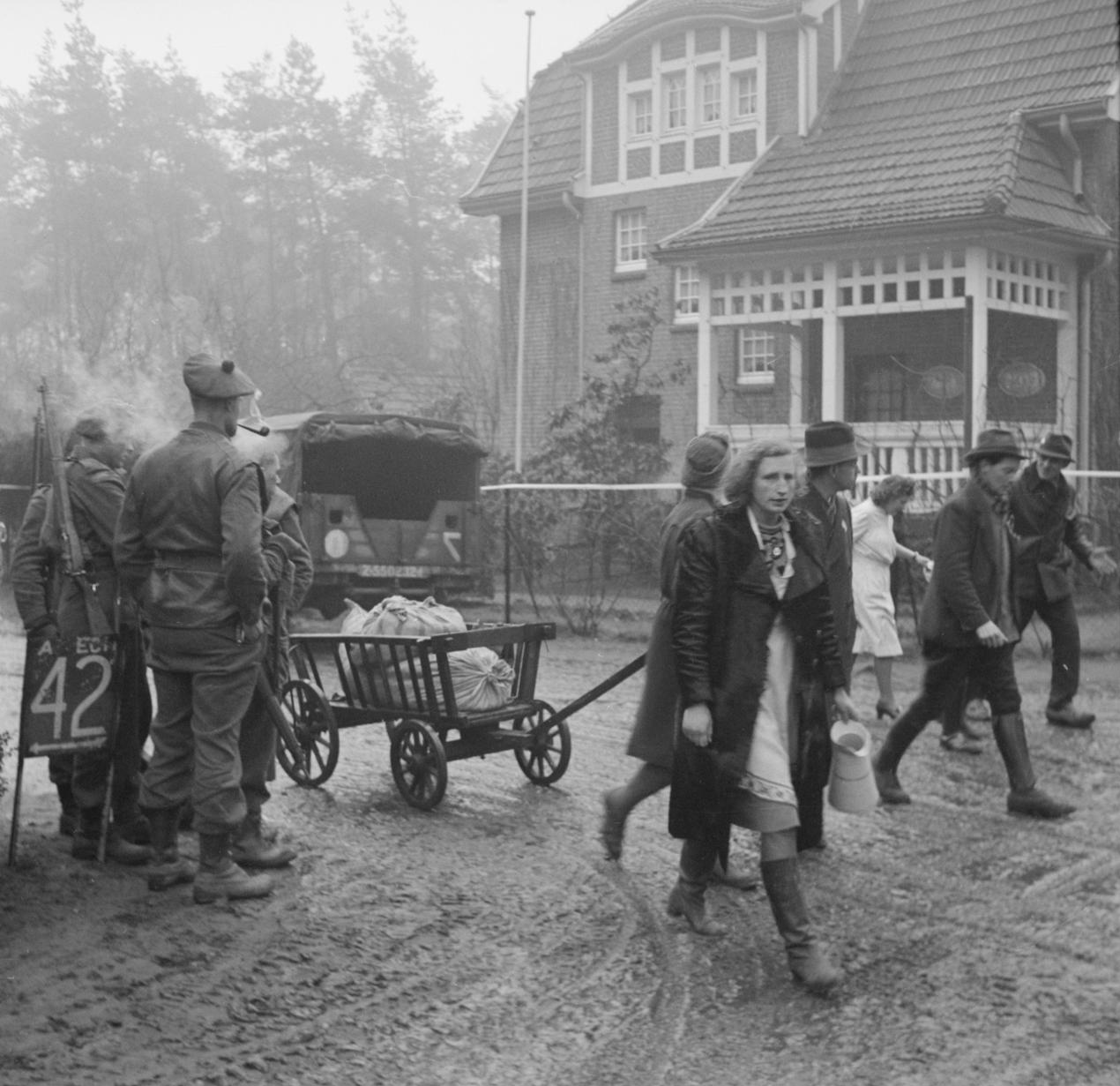
German refugees in Bedburg, near Kleve, 19 February 1945

Estimates of the total German war dead range from 5.5 to 6.9 million persons. A study by the historian Rüdiger Overmans puts the number of German military dead and missing at 5.3 million, including 900,000 men conscripted from outside of Germany's 1937 borders. Richard Overy estimated in 2014 that about 353,000 civilians were killed in Allied air raids. Other civilian deaths include 300,000 Germans (including Jews) who were victims of Nazi political, racial, and religious persecution and 200,000 who were murdered in the Nazi euthanasia program. Political courts called Sondergerichte sentenced some 12,000 members of the German resistance to death, and civil courts sentenced an additional 40,000 Germans. Mass rapes of German women also took place.

== Geography ==
=== Territorial changes ===
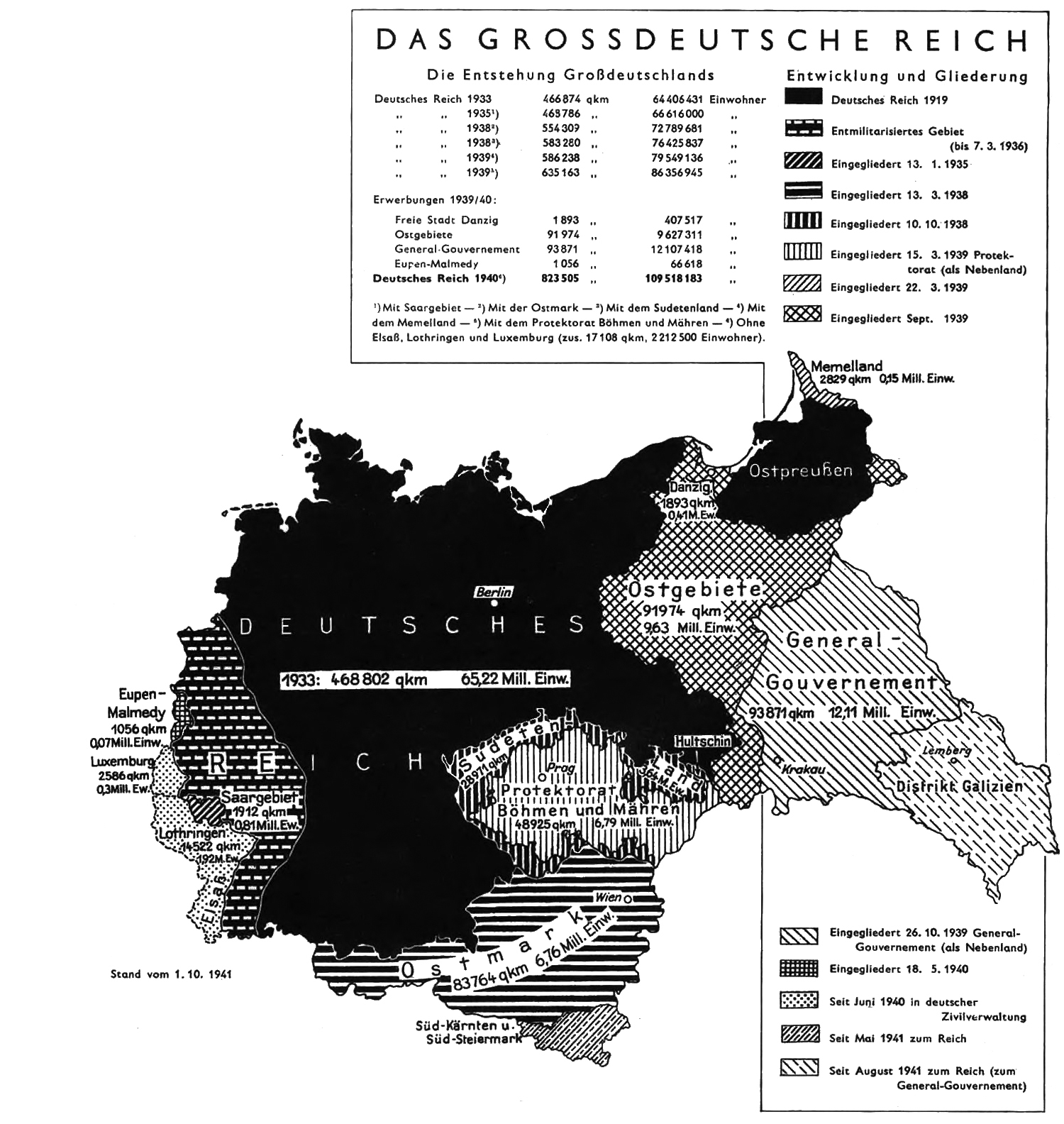
Territorial expansion of German Reich from 1933 to 1941 as explained to Wehrmacht soldiers, a Nazi era map in German

As a result of their defeat in World War I and the resulting Treaty of Versailles, Germany lost Alsace-Lorraine, Eupen-Malmedy, Northern Schleswig, and Memel. The Saarland became a protectorate of France under the condition that its residents would later decide by referendum which country to join, and Poland became a separate nation and was given access to the sea by the creation of the Polish Corridor, which separated Prussia from the rest of Germany, while Danzig was made a free city.

Germany regained control of the Saarland through a referendum held in 1935 and annexed Austria in the Anschluss of 1938. The Munich Agreement of 1938 gave Germany control of the Sudetenland, and they seized most of Czechoslovakia's remaining territory six months later. Under threat of invasion by sea, Lithuania surrendered the Memel district in March 1939.

Between 1939 and 1941, German forces invaded Poland, Denmark, Norway, France, Luxembourg, the Netherlands, Belgium, Yugoslavia, Greece, and the Soviet Union. Germany annexed parts of northern Yugoslavia in April 1941, while Mussolini ceded Trieste, South Tyrol, and Istria to Germany in 1943.

After the armistice between Italy and the Allies in September 1943, Germany invaded Italy, and Benito Mussolini established the Italian Social Republic as a fascist puppet state. Further north, Germany established the Operational Zone of the Alpine Foothills and the Operational Zone of the Adriatic Littoral. These operational zones were not considered Reich territory, but they were de facto incorporated and Germanized.

=== Occupied territories ===
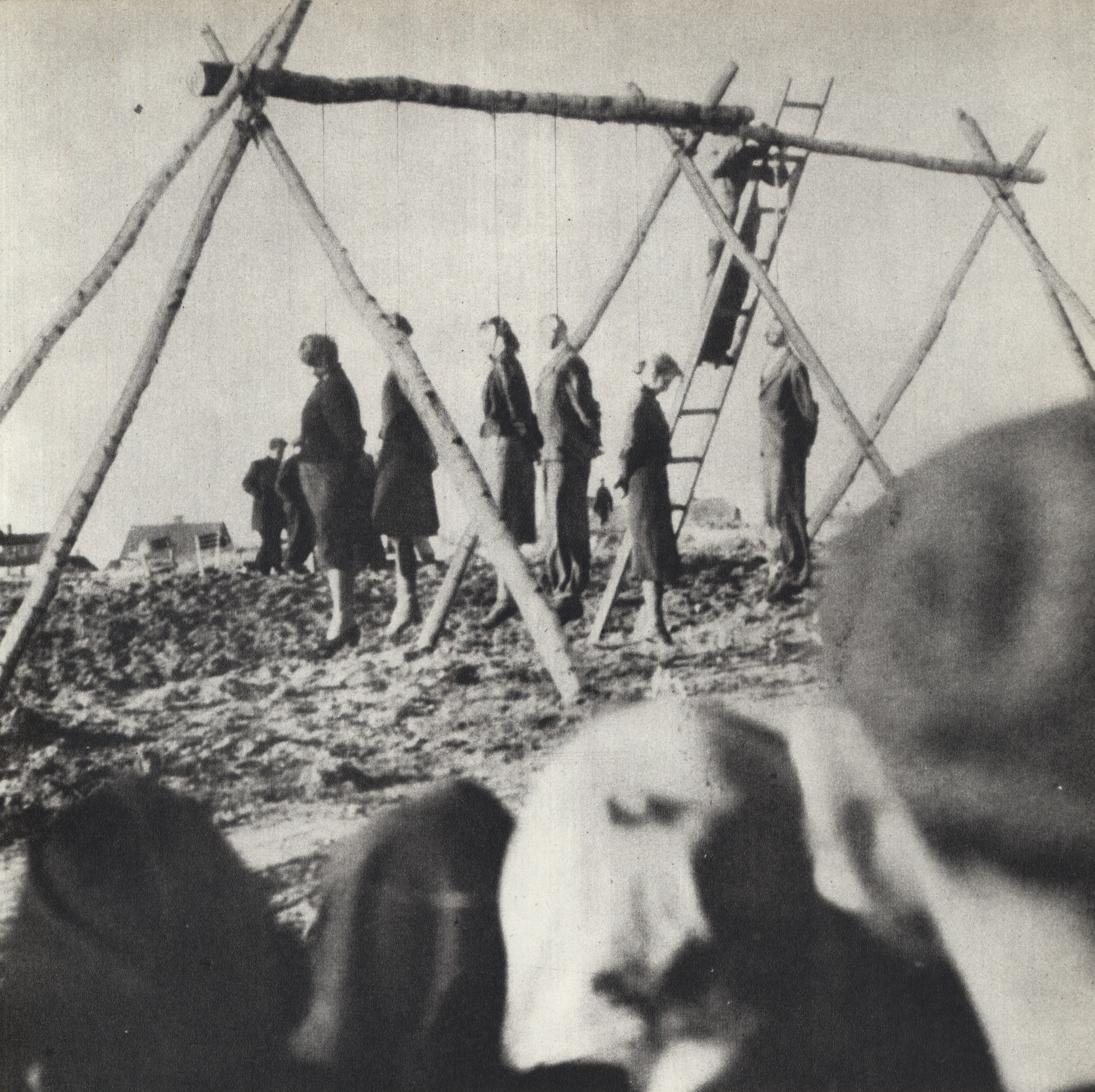
Public execution of 54 Poles in Rożki, Masovian Voivodeship (near Radom), German-occupied Poland, 1942

Some of the conquered territories were incorporated into Germany as part of Hitler's long-term goal of creating a Greater Germanic Reich. Several areas, such as Alsace-Lorraine, were placed under the authority of an adjacent Gau (regional district). The Reichskommissariate (Reich Commissariats), quasi-colonial regimes, were established in some occupied countries. Areas placed under German administration included the Protectorate of Bohemia and Moravia, Reichskommissariat Ostland (encompassing the Baltic states and Belarus), and Reichskommissariat Ukraine. Conquered areas of Belgium and France were placed under control of the Military Administration in Belgium and Northern France. Belgian Eupen-Malmedy, which had been part of Germany until 1919, was annexed. Part of Poland was incorporated into the Reich, and the General Government was established in occupied central Poland. The governments of Denmark, Norway (Reichskommissariat Norwegen), and the Netherlands (Reichskommissariat Niederlande) were placed under civilian administrations staffed largely by natives. (Note: More such districts, such as the Reichskommissariat Moskowien (Moscow), Reichskommissariat Kaukasien (Caucasus) and Reichskommissariat Turkestan (Turkestan) were proposed in case these areas were brought under German rule.) Hitler intended to eventually incorporate many of these areas into the Reich. Germany occupied the Italian protectorate of Albania and the Italian governorate of Montenegro in 1943 and installed a puppet government in occupied Serbia in 1941.

== Politics ==
=== Ideology ===
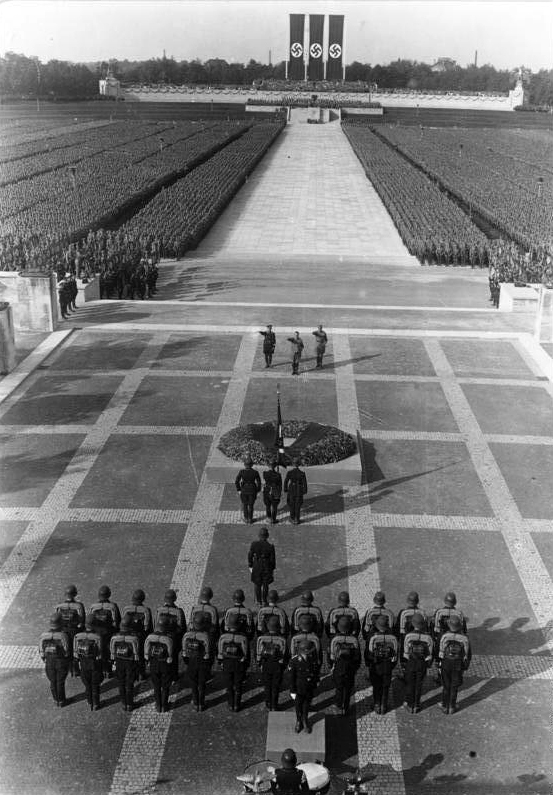
Heinrich Himmler, Hitler and Viktor Lutze perform the Nazi salute at the Nuremberg Rally, September 1934.

The Nazis were a far-right fascist political party that arose during the social and financial upheavals that occurred following the end of World War I. The Party remained small and marginalised, receiving 2.6% of the federal vote in 1928, prior to the onset of the Great Depression in 1929. By 1930 the Party won 18.3% of the federal vote, making it the Reichstag's second largest political party. While in prison after the failed Beer Hall Putsch of 1923, Hitler wrote Mein Kampf, which laid out his plan for transforming German society into one based on race. Nazi ideology brought together elements of antisemitism, racial hygiene, and eugenics, and combined them with pan-Germanism and territorial expansionism with the goal of obtaining more Lebensraum for the Germanic people.

The regime attempted to obtain this new territory by attacking Poland and the Soviet Union, intending to mass-murder or deport the Jews and Slavs living there, who it viewed as being inferior to the Aryan master race and part of a Jewish-Bolshevik conspiracy. The Nazi regime believed that only Germany could defeat the forces of Bolshevism and save humanity from world domination by International Jewry. Other people deemed life unworthy of life by the Nazis included the mentally and physically disabled, Romani people, homosexuals, Jehovah's Witnesses, and social misfits. Additionally, Freemasons were heavily monitored and persecuted.

Influenced by the Völkisch movement, the regime was against cultural modernism and supported the development of an extensive military at the expense of intellectualism. Creativity and art were stifled, except where they could serve as propaganda media. The party used symbols such as the Blood Flag and rituals such as the Nazi Party rallies to foster unity and bolster the regime's popularity.

=== Government ===
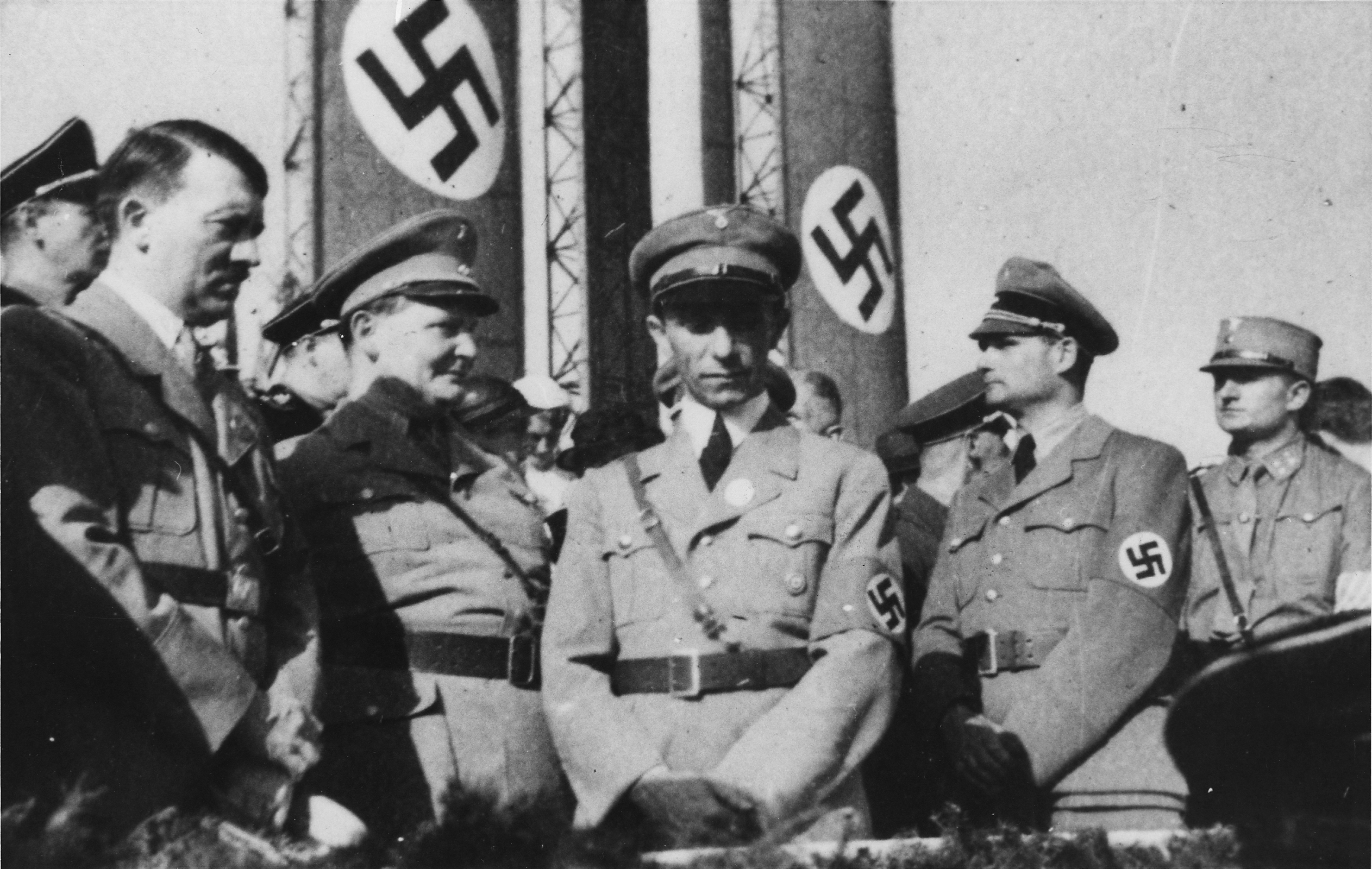
Hitler, Göring, Goebbels, and Rudolf Hess during a military parade in 1933

Hitler ruled Germany autocratically by asserting the Führerprinzip ("leader principle"), which called for absolute obedience by all subordinates. He viewed the government structure as a pyramid, with himself—the infallible leader—at the apex. Party rank was not determined by elections, and positions were filled through appointment by those of higher rank. The party used propaganda to develop a cult of personality around Hitler. Historians such as Kershaw emphasise the psychological impact of Hitler's skill as an orator. While top officials reported to Hitler and followed his policies, they had considerable autonomy. He expected officials to "work towards the Führer" – to take the initiative in promoting policies and actions in line with party goals and Hitler's wishes, without his involvement in day-to-day decision-making. The government was a disorganised collection of factions led by the party elite, who struggled to amass power and gain the Führer's favour. Hitler's leadership style was to give contradictory orders to his subordinates and to place them in positions where their duties and responsibilities overlapped. In this way he fostered distrust, competition, and infighting among his subordinates to consolidate and maximise his own power.

Successive Reichsstatthalter decrees between 1933 and 1935 abolished the existing Länder (constituent states) of Germany and replaced them with new administrative divisions, the Gaue, governed by Nazi leaders (Gauleiters). The change was never fully implemented, as the Länder were still used as administrative divisions for some government departments such as education. This led to a bureaucratic tangle of overlapping jurisdictions and responsibilities typical of the administrative style of the Nazi regime. The Weimar Republic's federalism was abolished in favour of a highly centralised unitary state.

Jewish civil servants lost their jobs in 1933, except for those who had seen military service in World War I. Members of the Party or party supporters were appointed in their place. As part of the process of Gleichschaltung, the Reich Local Government Law of 1935 abolished local elections, and mayors were appointed by the Ministry of the Interior.

=== Law ===
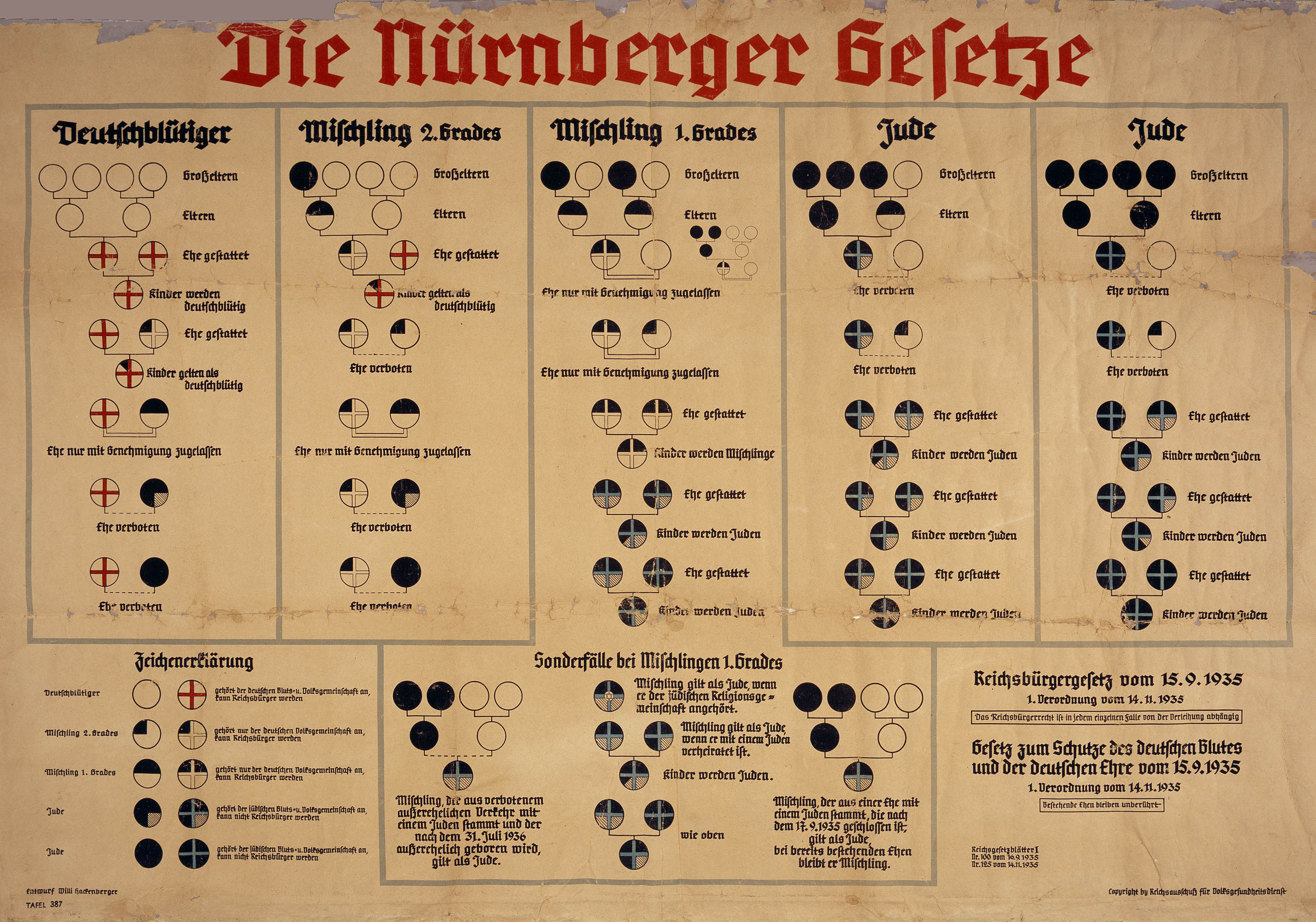
Chart showing the pseudo-scientific racial divisions used in the racial policies of Nazi Germany

In August 1934, civil servants and members of the military were required to swear an oath of unconditional obedience to Hitler. These laws became the basis of the Führerprinzip, the concept that Hitler's word overrode all existing laws. Any acts that were sanctioned by Hitler—even murder—thus became legal. All legislation proposed by cabinet ministers had to be approved by the office of Deputy Führer Rudolf Hess, who could also veto top civil service appointments.

Most of the judicial system and legal codes of the Weimar Republic remained in place to deal with non-political crimes. The courts issued and carried out far more death sentences than before the Nazis took power. People who were convicted of three or more offences—even petty ones—could be deemed habitual offenders and jailed indefinitely. People such as prostitutes and pickpockets were judged to be inherently criminal and a threat to the community. Thousands were arrested and confined indefinitely without trial.

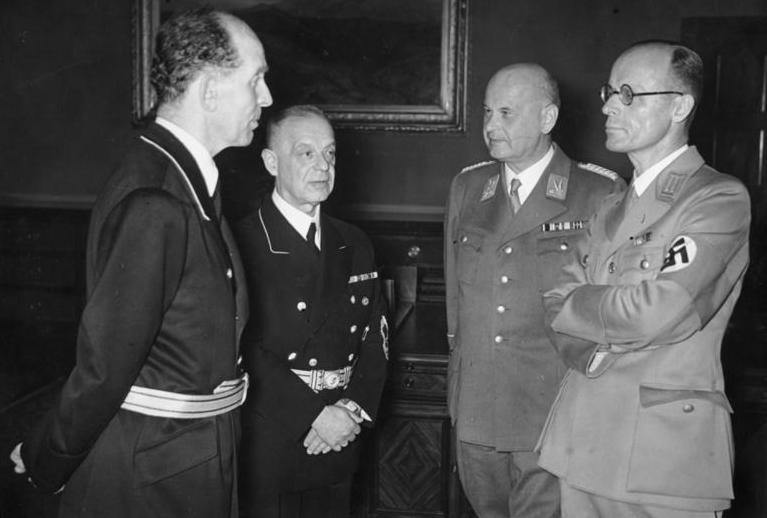
A meeting of the four jurists who imposed Nazi ideology on the legal system of Germany (left to right: Roland Freisler, Franz Schlegelberger, Otto Georg Thierack, and Curt Rothenberger)

A new type of court, the Volksgerichtshof ("People's Court"), was established in 1934 to deal with political cases. This court handed out over 5,000 death sentences until its dissolution in 1945. The death penalty could be issued for offences such as being a communist, printing seditious leaflets, or even making jokes about Hitler or other officials. The Gestapo was in charge of investigative policing to enforce Nazi ideology as they located and confined political offenders, Jews, and others deemed undesirable. Political offenders who were released from prison were often immediately re-arrested by the Gestapo and confined in a concentration camp.

The Nazis used propaganda to promulgate the concept of Rassenschande ("race defilement") to justify the need for racial laws. In September 1935, the Nuremberg Laws were enacted. These laws initially prohibited sexual relations and marriages between Aryans and Jews and were later extended to include "Gypsies, Negroes or their bastard offspring". The law also forbade the employment of German women under the age of 45 as domestic servants in Jewish households. The Reich Citizenship Law stated that only those of "German or related blood" could be citizens. Thus Jews and other non-Aryans were stripped of their German citizenship. The law also permitted the Nazis to deny citizenship to anyone who was not supportive enough of the regime. A supplementary decree issued in November defined as Jewish anyone with three Jewish grandparents, or two grandparents if the Jewish faith was followed.

== Military and paramilitary ==
=== Wehrmacht ===
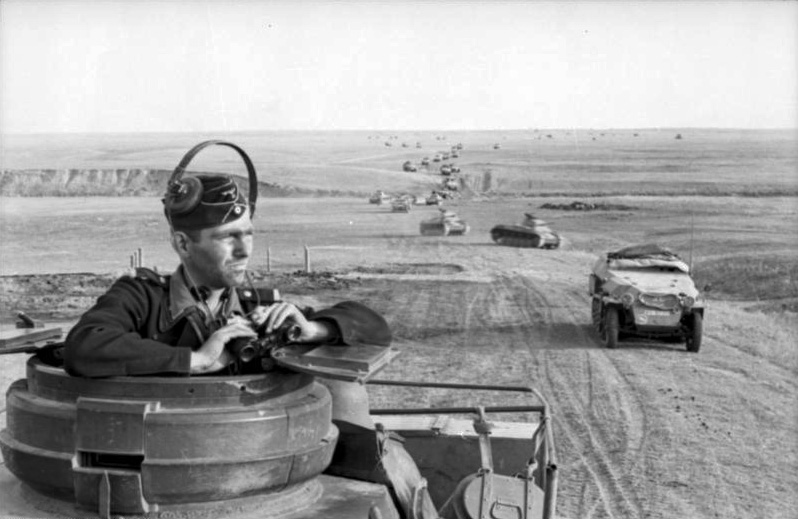
A column of tanks and other armoured vehicles of the Panzerwaffe near Stalingrad, 1942

The unified armed forces of Germany from 1935 to 1945 were called the Wehrmacht (defence force). This included the Heer (army), Kriegsmarine (navy), and the Luftwaffe (air force). From 2 August 1934, members of the armed forces were required to pledge an oath of unconditional obedience to Hitler personally. In contrast to the previous oath, which required allegiance to the constitution of the country and its lawful establishments, this new oath required members of the military to obey Hitler even if they were being ordered to do something illegal. Hitler decreed that the army would have to tolerate and even offer logistical support to the Einsatzgruppen—the mobile death squads responsible for millions of murders in Eastern Europe—when it was tactically possible to do so. Wehrmacht troops also participated directly in the Holocaust by shooting civilians or committing genocide under the guise of anti-partisan operations. The party line was that the Jews were the instigators of the partisan struggle and therefore needed to be eliminated. On 8 July 1941 Heydrich announced that all Jews in the eastern conquered territories were to be regarded as partisans and gave the order for all male Jews between the ages of 15 and 45 to be shot. By August, this was extended to include the entire Jewish population.

In spite of efforts to prepare the country militarily, the economy could not sustain a lengthy war of attrition. A strategy was developed based on the tactic of Blitzkrieg ("lightning war"), which involved using quick coordinated assaults that avoided enemy strong points. Attacks began with artillery bombardment, followed by bombing and strafing runs. Next the tanks would attack and finally the infantry would move in to secure the captured area. Victories continued through mid-1940, but the failure to defeat Britain was the first major turning point in the war. The decision to attack the Soviet Union and the decisive defeat at Stalingrad led to the retreat of the German armies and the eventual loss of the war. The total number of soldiers who served in the Wehrmacht from 1935 to 1945 was around 18.2 million, of whom 5.3 million died.

=== SA and SS ===
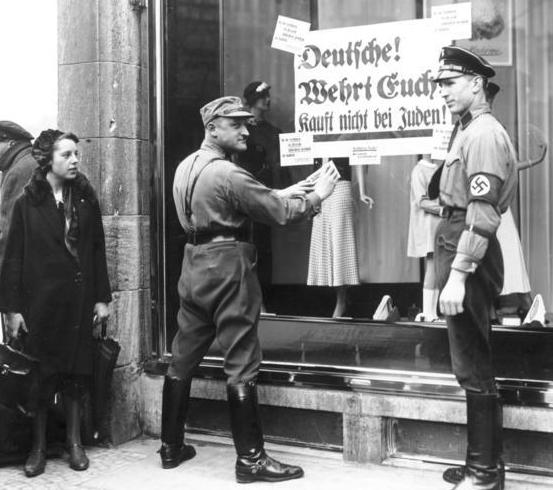
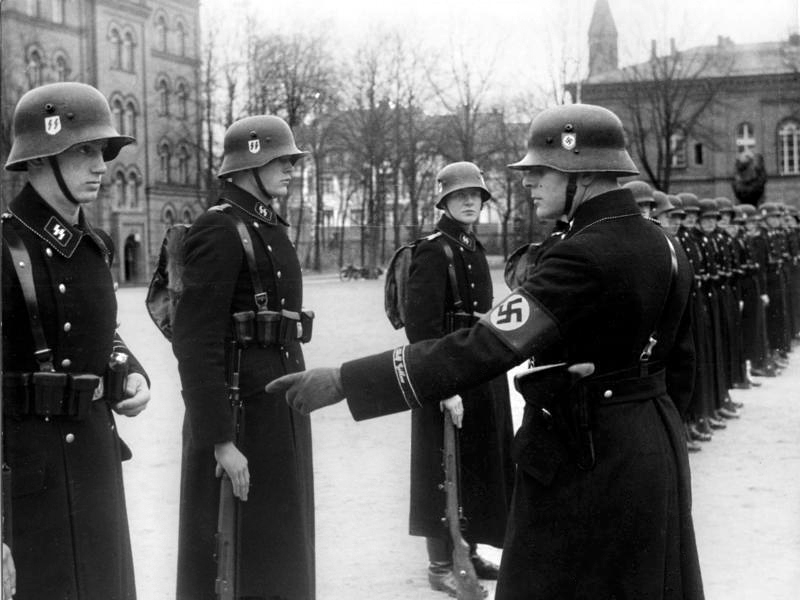
(Top) SA members enforce a boycott of Jewish stores, 1 April 1933.
(Bottom) Troop inspection in Berlin of the Leibstandarte SS Adolf Hitler, 1938

The Sturmabteilung (SA; Storm Detachment), or Brownshirts, founded in 1921, was the first paramilitary wing of the Nazi Party; their initial assignment was to protect Nazi leaders at rallies and assemblies. They also took part in street battles against the forces of rival political parties and violent actions against Jews and others. Under Ernst Röhm's leadership the SA grew by 1934 to over half a million members—4.5 million including reserves—at a time when the regular army was still limited to 100,000 men by the Versailles Treaty.

Röhm hoped to assume command of the army and absorb it into the ranks of the SA. Hindenburg and Defence Minister Werner von Blomberg threatened to impose martial law if the activities of the SA were not curtailed. Therefore, less than a year and a half after seizing power, Hitler ordered the deaths of the SA leadership, including Rohm. After the purge of 1934, the SA was no longer a major force.

Initially a small bodyguard unit under the auspices of the SA, the Schutzstaffel (SS; Protection Squadron) grew to become one of the largest and most powerful groups in Nazi Germany. Led by Reichsführer-SS Heinrich Himmler from 1929, the SS had over a quarter million members by 1938. Himmler initially envisioned the SS as being an elite group of guards, Hitler's last line of defence. The Waffen-SS, the military branch of the SS, evolved into a second army. It was dependent on the regular army for heavy weaponry and equipment, and most units were under tactical control of the High Command of the Armed Forces (OKW). By the end of 1942, the stringent selection and racial requirements that had initially been in place were no longer followed. With recruitment and conscription based only on expansion, by 1943 the Waffen-SS could not longer claim to be an elite fighting force.

SS formations committed many war crimes against civilians and allied servicemen. From 1935 onward, the SS spearheaded the persecution of Jews, who were rounded up into ghettos and concentration camps. With the outbreak of World War II, the SS Einsatzgruppen units followed the army into Poland and the Soviet Union, where from 1941 to 1945 they murdered more than two million people, including 1.3 million Jews. A third of the Einsatzgruppen members were recruited from Waffen-SS personnel. The SS-Totenkopfverbände (death's head units) ran the concentration camps and extermination camps, where millions more were murdered. Up to 60,000 Waffen-SS men served in the camps.

In 1931 Himmler organised an SS intelligence service which became known as the Sicherheitsdienst (SD; Security Service) under his deputy, Heydrich. This organisation was tasked with locating and arresting communists and other political opponents. Himmler established the beginnings of a parallel economy under the auspices of the SS Economy and Administration Head Office. This holding company owned housing corporations, factories, and publishing houses.

== Economy ==
=== Reich economics ===
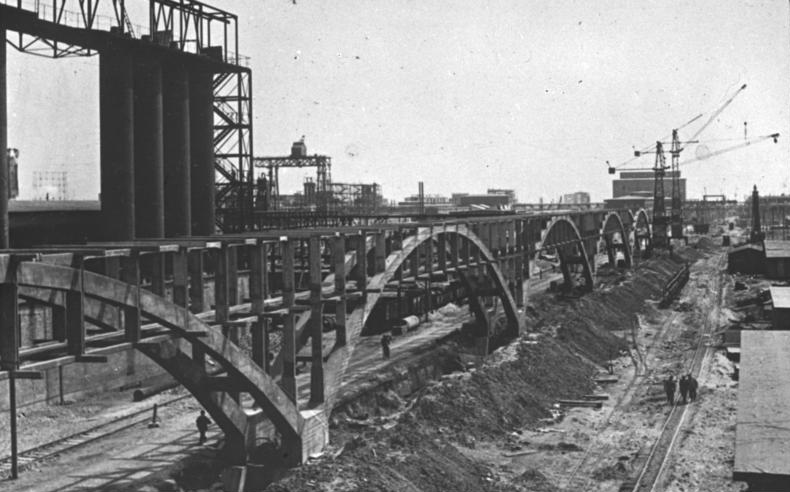
IG Farben synthetic oil plant under construction at Buna Werke (1941). This plant was part of the complex at Auschwitz concentration camp.

The most pressing economic matter the Nazis initially faced was the 30 per cent national unemployment rate. The economist Hjalmar Schacht, President of the Reichsbank and Minister of Economics, created a scheme for deficit financing in May 1933. Capital projects were paid for with the issuance of promissory notes called Mefo bills. When the notes were presented for payment, the Reichsbank printed money. Hitler and his economic team expected that the upcoming territorial expansion would provide the means of repaying the soaring national debt. Schacht's administration achieved a rapid decline in the unemployment rate, the largest of any country during the Great Depression. Economic recovery was uneven, with reduced hours of work and erratic availability of necessities, leading to disenchantment with the regime as early as 1934.

In October 1933 the Junkers Aircraft Works was expropriated. In concert with other aircraft manufacturers and under the direction of Aviation Minister Göring, production was ramped up. From a workforce of 3,200 people producing 100 units per year in 1932, the industry grew to employ a quarter of a million workers manufacturing over 10,000 technically advanced aircraft annually less than ten years later.

An elaborate bureaucracy was created to regulate imports of raw materials and finished goods with the intention of eliminating foreign competition in the German marketplace and improving the nation's balance of payments. The Nazis encouraged the development of synthetic replacements for materials such as oil and textiles. As the market was experiencing a glut and prices for petroleum were low, in 1933 the Nazi government made a profit-sharing agreement with IG Farben, guaranteeing them a 5 per cent return on capital invested in their synthetic oil plant at Leuna. Any profits in excess of that amount would be turned over to the Reich. By 1936, Farben regretted making the deal, as excess profits were by then being generated. In another attempt to secure an adequate wartime supply of petroleum, Germany intimidated Romania into signing a trade agreement in March 1939.

Major public works projects financed with deficit spending included the construction of a network of Autobahnen and providing funding for programmes initiated by the previous government for housing and agricultural improvements. To stimulate the construction industry, credit was offered to private businesses and subsidies were made available for home purchases and repairs. On the condition that the wife would leave the workforce, a loan of up to 1,000 Reichsmarks could be accessed by young couples of Aryan descent who intended to marry, and the amount that had to be repaid was reduced by 25 per cent for each child born. The caveat that the woman had to remain unemployed outside the home was dropped by 1937 due to a shortage of skilled labourers.

Envisioning widespread car ownership as part of the new Germany, Hitler arranged for designer Ferdinand Porsche to draw up plans for the KdF-wagen (Strength Through Joy car), intended to be an automobile that everyone could afford. A prototype was displayed at the International Motor Show in Berlin on 17 February 1939. With the outbreak of World War II, the factory was converted to produce military vehicles. None were sold until after the war, when the vehicle was renamed the Volkswagen (people's car).

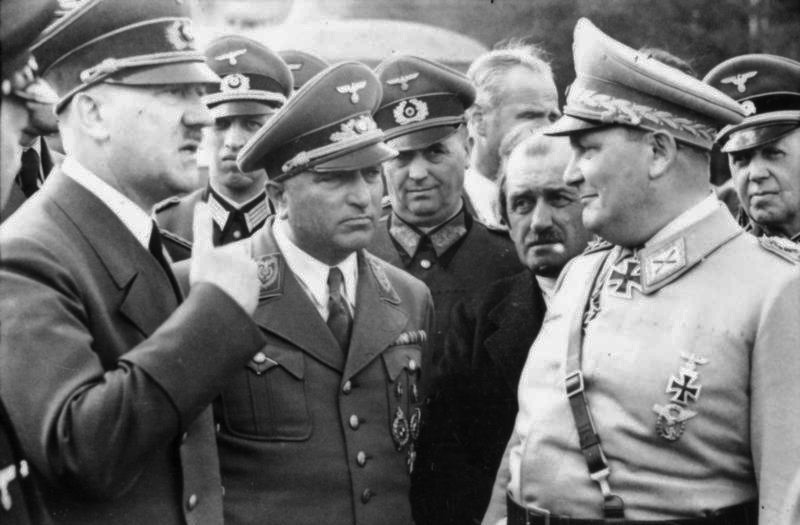
(from left) Hitler; Robert Ley, head of the German Labour Front; Ferdinand Porsche, armaments manufacturer; and Hermann Göring, head of the Four Year Plan (1942)

Six million people were unemployed when the Nazis took power in 1933 and by 1937 there were fewer than a million. This was in part due to the removal of women from the workforce. Real wages dropped by 25 per cent between 1933 and 1938. After the dissolution of the trade unions in May 1933, their funds were seized and their leadership arrested, including those who attempted to co-operate with the Nazis. A new organisation, the German Labour Front, was created and placed under the Nazi Party functionary Robert Ley. Many unemployed people were forcibly drafted into this organisation, where they were given uniforms and tools and put to work. As a result, unemployed people disappeared from the streets, contributing to the perception that the Nazis were improving economic conditions. The average work week was 43 hours in 1933; by 1939 this increased to 47 hours.

By early 1934, the focus shifted towards rearmament. By 1935, military expenditures accounted for 73 per cent of the government's purchases of goods and services. On 18 October 1936, Hitler named Göring as Plenipotentiary of the Four Year Plan, intended to speed up rearmament. In addition to calling for the rapid construction of steel mills, synthetic rubber plants, and other factories, Göring instituted wage and price controls and restricted the issuance of stock dividends. Large expenditures were made on rearmament in spite of growing deficits. Plans unveiled in late 1938 for massive increases to the navy and air force were impossible to fulfil, as Germany lacked the finances and material resources to build the planned units, as well as the necessary fuel required to keep them running. With the introduction of compulsory military service in 1935, the Reichswehr, which had been limited to 100,000 by the terms of the Versailles Treaty, expanded to 750,000 on active service at the start of World War II, with a million more in the reserve. By January 1939, unemployment was down to 301,800 and it dropped to only 77,500 by September.

=== Wartime economy and forced labour ===
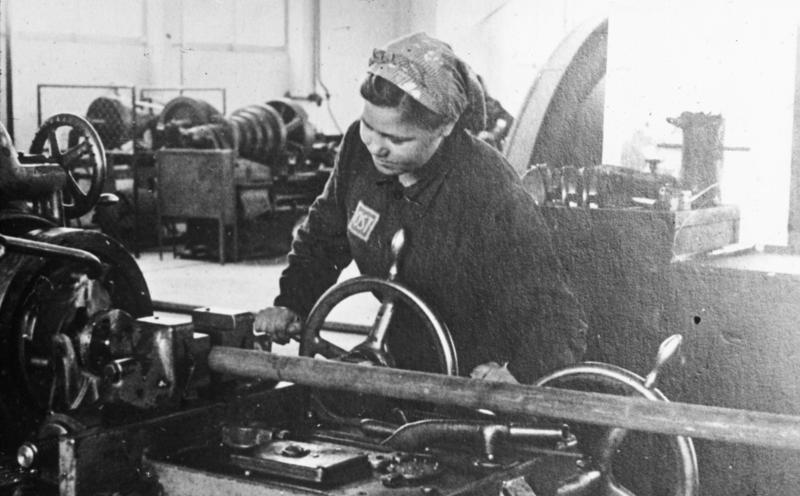
Woman with Ostarbeiter badge at the IG Farben plant in Auschwitz

The Nazi war economy was a mixed economy that combined a free market with central planning. The historian Richard Overy describes it as being somewhere in between the command economy of the Soviet Union and the capitalist system of the United States.

In 1942, after the death of Armaments Minister Fritz Todt, Hitler appointed Albert Speer as his replacement. Wartime rationing of consumer goods led to an increase in personal savings, funds which were in turn lent to the government to support the war effort. By 1944, the war was consuming 75 per cent of Germany's gross domestic product, compared to 60 per cent in the Soviet Union and 55 per cent in Britain. Speer improved production by centralising planning and control, reducing production of consumer goods, and using forced labour and slavery. The wartime economy eventually relied heavily upon the large-scale employment of slave labour. Germany imported and enslaved some 12 million people from 20 European countries to work in factories and on farms. Approximately 75 per cent were Eastern European. Many were casualties of Allied bombing, as they received poor air raid protection. Poor living conditions led to high rates of sickness, injury, and death, as well as sabotage and criminal activity. The wartime economy also relied upon large-scale robbery, initially through the state seizing the property of Jewish citizens and later by plundering the resources of occupied territories.

Foreign workers brought into Germany were put into four classifications: guest workers, military internees, civilian workers, and Eastern workers. Each group was subject to different regulations. The Nazis issued a ban on sexual relations between Germans and foreign workers.

By 1944 over a half million women served as auxiliaries in the German armed forces. The number of women in paid employment only increased by 271,000 (1.8 per cent) from 1939 to 1944. As the production of consumer goods had been cut back, women left those industries for employment in the war economy. They also took jobs formerly held by men, especially on farms and in family-owned shops.

Very heavy strategic bombing by the Allies targeted refineries producing synthetic oil and gasoline, as well as the German transportation system, especially rail yards and canals. The armaments industry began to break down by September 1944. By November, fuel coal was no longer reaching its destinations and the production of new armaments was no longer possible. Overy argues that the bombing strained the German war economy and forced it to divert up to one-fourth of its manpower and industry into anti-aircraft resources, which very likely shortened the war.

== Racial policy and eugenics ==
=== Racism and antisemitism ===
Racism and antisemitism were basic tenets of the Nazi Party and the Nazi regime. Nazi Germany's racial policy was based on their belief in the existence of a superior master race. The Nazis postulated the existence of a racial conflict between the Aryan master race and inferior races, particularly Jews, who were viewed as a mixed race that had infiltrated society and were responsible for the exploitation and repression of the Aryan race.

=== Persecution of Jews ===
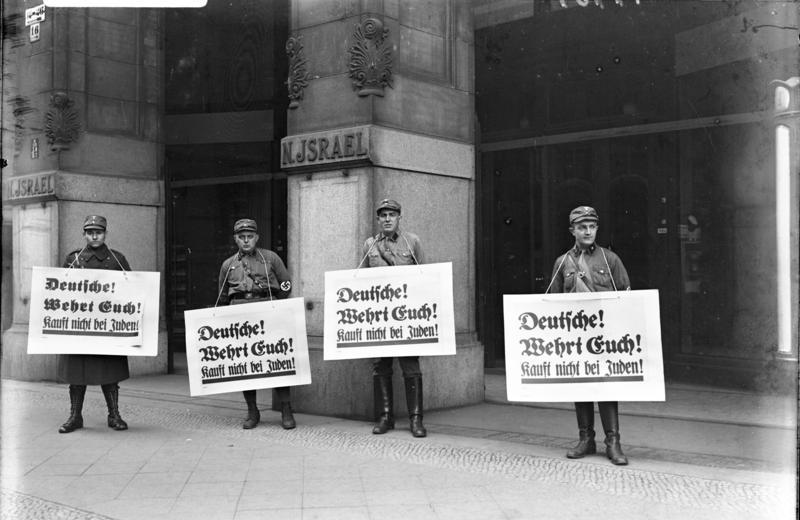
Nazi boycott of Jewish businesses, April 1933. The posters say "Germans! Defend yourselves! Don't buy from Jews!"

Discrimination against Jews began immediately after the seizure of power. Following a month-long series of attacks by members of the SA on Jewish businesses and synagogues, on 1 April 1933 Hitler declared a national boycott of Jewish businesses. The Law for the Restoration of the Professional Civil Service passed on 7 April forced all non-Aryan civil servants to retire from the legal profession and civil service. Similar legislation soon deprived other Jewish professionals of their right to practise, and on 11 April a decree was promulgated that stated anyone who had even one Jewish parent or grandparent was considered non-Aryan. As part of the drive to remove Jewish influence from cultural life, members of the National Socialist German Students' League removed from libraries any books considered un-German, and a nationwide book burning was held on 10 May.

The regime used violence and economic pressure to encourage Jews to leave the country voluntarily. Jewish businesses were denied access to markets, forbidden to advertise, and deprived of access to government contracts. Citizens were harassed and subjected to violent attacks. Many towns posted signs forbidding entry to Jews.

On 7 November 1938 a young Jewish man, Herschel Grynszpan, shot and killed Ernst vom Rath, a legation secretary at the German embassy in Paris, to protest against his family's treatment in Germany. This incident provided the pretext for a pogrom the Nazis incited against the Jews two days later. Members of the SA damaged or destroyed synagogues and Jewish property throughout Germany. At least 91 German Jews were murdered during this pogrom, later called Kristallnacht, the Night of Broken Glass. Further restrictions were imposed on Jews in the coming months – they were forbidden to own businesses or work in retail shops, drive cars, go to the cinema, visit the library, or own weapons, and Jewish pupils were removed from schools. The Jewish community was fined one billion marks to pay for the damage caused by Kristallnacht and told that any insurance settlements would be confiscated. By 1939 around 250,000 of Germany's 437,000 Jews had emigrated to the United States, Argentina, the United Kingdom, Palestine, and other countries. Many chose to stay in continental Europe. Emigrants to Palestine were allowed to transfer property there under the terms of the Haavara Agreement, but those moving to other countries had to leave virtually all their property behind, and it was seized by the government.

=== Persecution of Romani ===
Like the Jews, the Romani were subjected to persecution from the early days of the regime. The Romani were forbidden to marry people of German extraction. They were shipped to concentration camps starting in 1935 and many were murdered. Following the invasion of Poland, 2,500 Roma and Sinti people were deported from Germany to the General Government, where they were imprisoned in labour camps. The survivors were likely exterminated at Bełżec, Sobibor, or Treblinka. A further 5,000 Sinti and Austrian Lalleri people were deported to the Łódź Ghetto in late 1941, where half were estimated to have died. The Romani survivors of the ghetto were subsequently moved to the Chełmno extermination camp in early 1942.

The Nazis intended on deporting all Romani people from Germany, and confined them to Zigeunerlager (Gypsy camps) for this purpose. Himmler ordered their deportation from Germany in December 1942, with few exceptions. A total of 23,000 Romani were deported to Auschwitz concentration camp, of whom 19,000 died. Outside of Germany, the Romani people were regularly used for forced labour, though many were murdered outright. In the Baltic states and the Soviet Union, 30,000 Romani were murdered by the SS, the German Army, and Einsatzgruppen. In occupied Serbia, 1,000 to 12,000 Romani were murdered, while nearly all 25,000 Romani living in the Independent State of Croatia were murdered. The estimates at end of the war put the total number of Romani victims at around 220,000, which equalled approximately 25 per cent of the Romani population in Europe.

=== Other persecuted groups ===
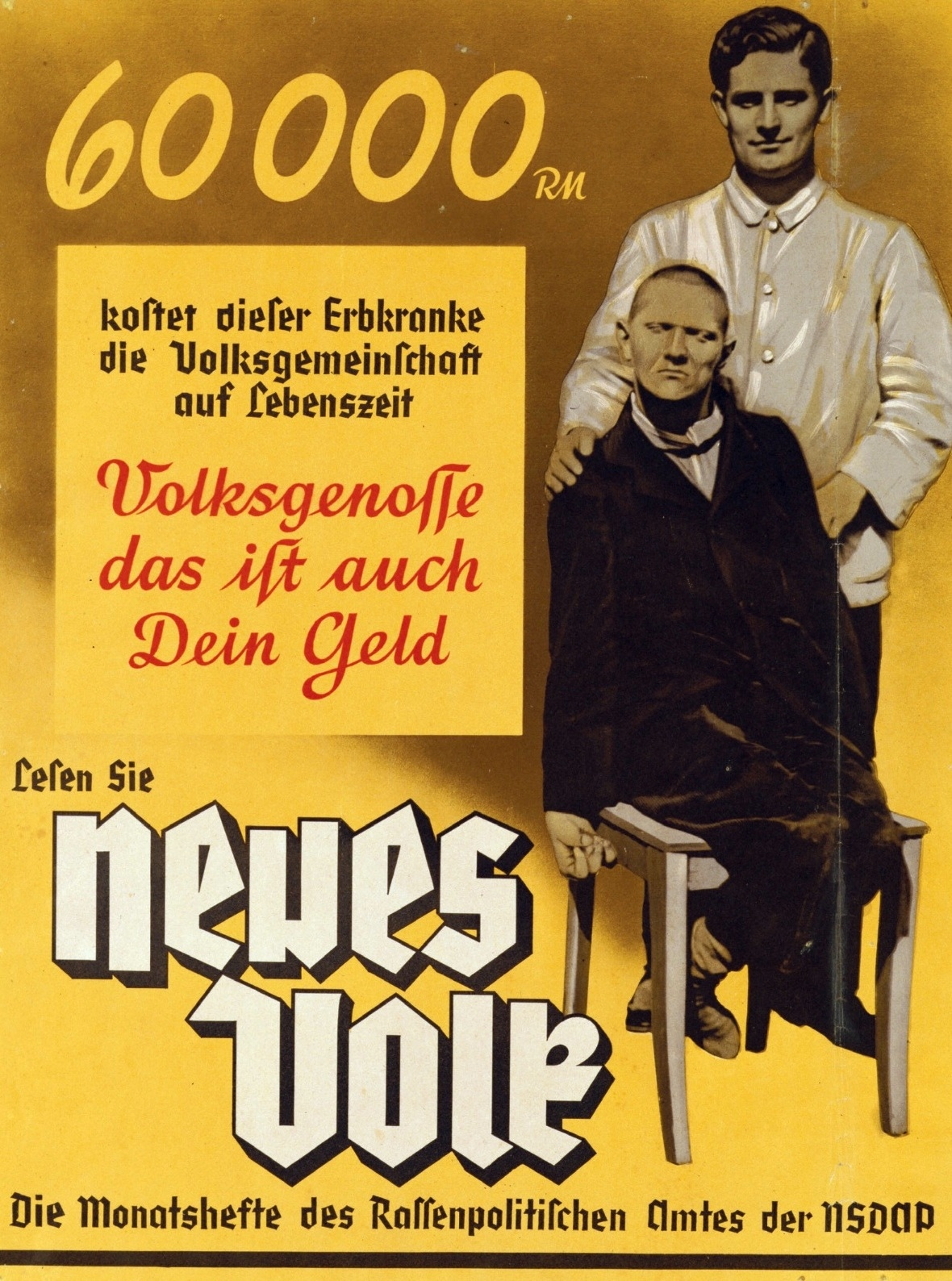
Poster from the Nazi Party's Office of Racial Policy: "60 000 RM is what this person with hereditary illness costs the community in his lifetime. Fellow citizen, that is your money too."

Action T4 was a programme of systematic murder of the physically and mentally handicapped and patients in psychiatric hospitals that took place mainly from 1939 to 1941, and continued until the end of the war. Initially the victims were shot by the Einsatzgruppen and others; gas chambers and gas vans using carbon monoxide were used by early 1940. Under the Law for the Prevention of Hereditarily Diseased Offspring, enacted on 14 July 1933, over 400,000 individuals underwent compulsory sterilisation. Over half were those considered mentally deficient, which included not only people who scored poorly on intelligence tests, but those who deviated from expected standards of behaviour regarding thrift, sexual behaviour, and cleanliness. Most of the victims came from disadvantaged groups such as prostitutes, the poor, the homeless, and criminals. Other groups persecuted and murdered included Jehovah's Witnesses, homosexuals, social misfits, and members of the political and religious opposition.

=== Generalplan Ost ===
Germany's war in the East was based on Hitler's long-standing view that Jews were the great enemy of the German people and that Lebensraum was needed for Germany's expansion. Hitler focused his attention on Eastern Europe, aiming to conquer Poland and the Soviet Union. Hitler's belief in the racial inferiority of Russians, as well as Slavs in general, had convinced him that a German conquest of Russia was inevitable. After the occupation of Poland in 1939, all Jews living in the General Government were confined to ghettos, and those who were physically fit were required to perform compulsory labour. In 1941 Hitler decided to destroy the Polish nation completely; within 15 to 20 years the General Government was to be cleared of ethnic Poles and resettled by German colonists. About 3.8 to 4 million Poles would remain as slaves, part of a slave labour force of 14 million the Nazis intended to create using citizens of conquered nations.

To determine who should be killed, Himmler created the Volksliste, a system of classification of people deemed to be of German blood. He ordered that those of Germanic descent who refused to be classified as ethnic Germans should be deported to concentration camps, have their children taken away, or be assigned to forced labour. The plan also included the kidnapping of children deemed to have Aryan-Nordic traits, who were presumed to be of German descent. The goal was to implement Generalplan Ost after the conquest of the Soviet Union, but when the invasion failed Hitler had to consider other options. One suggestion was a mass forced deportation of Jews to Poland, Palestine, or Madagascar.

In addition, the Nazis planned to reduce the population of the conquered territories by 30 million people through starvation in an action called the Hunger Plan. Food supplies would be diverted to the German army and German civilians. Cities would be razed and the land allowed to return to forest or resettled by German colonists. Together, the Hunger Plan and Generalplan Ost would have led to the starvation of 80 million people in the Soviet Union. These partially fulfilled plans resulted in the democidal deaths of an estimated 19.3 million civilians and prisoners of war (POWs) throughout the USSR and elsewhere in Europe. During the course of the war, the Soviet Union lost a total of 27 million people; less than nine million of these were combat deaths. One in four of the Soviet population were killed or wounded.

=== The Holocaust and Final Solution ===
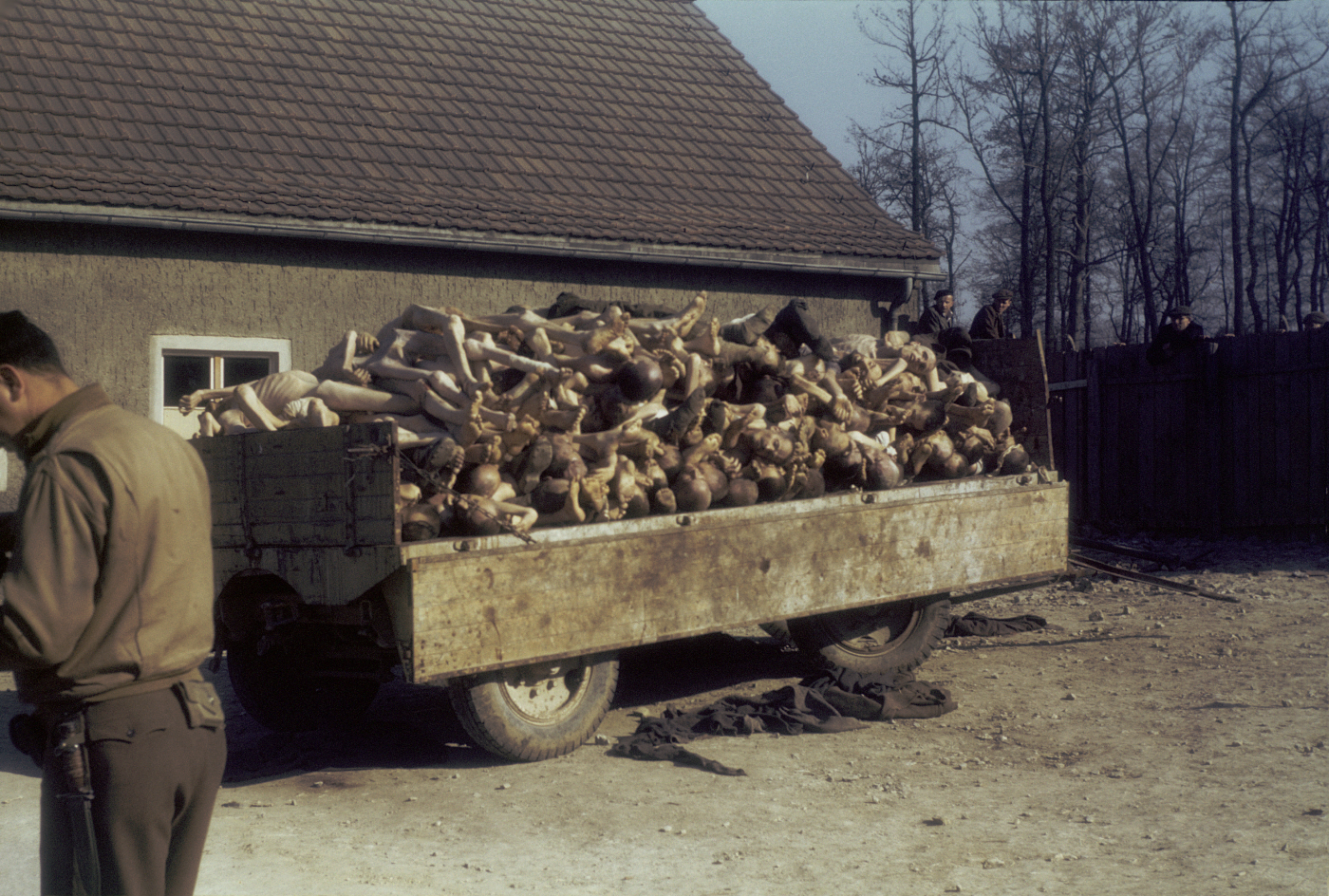
A wagon piled high with corpses outside the crematorium in the Buchenwald concentration camp liberated by the U.S. Army, 1945

Around the time of the failed offensive against Moscow in December 1941, Hitler resolved that the Jews of Europe were to be exterminated immediately. While the murder of Jewish civilians had been ongoing in the occupied territories of Poland and the Soviet Union, plans for the total eradication of the Jewish population of Europe—eleven million people—were formalised at the Wannsee Conference on 20 January 1942. Some would be worked to death and the rest would be murdered in the implementation of the Final Solution to the Jewish Question. Initially the victims were murdered by Einsatzgruppen firing squads, then by stationary gas chambers or by gas vans, but these methods proved impractical for an operation of this scale. By 1942 extermination camps equipped with gas chambers were established at Auschwitz, Chełmno, Sobibor, Treblinka, and elsewhere. The total number of Jews murdered is estimated at 5.5 to six million, including over a million children.

The Allies received information about the murders from the Polish government-in-exile and Polish leadership in Warsaw, based mostly on intelligence from the Polish underground. German citizens had access to information about what was happening, as soldiers returning from the occupied territories reported on what they had seen and done. Historian Richard J. Evans states that most German citizens disapproved of the genocide. (Note: "Nevertheless, the available evidence suggests that, on the whole, ordinary Germans did not approve. Goebbel's propaganda campaigns carried out in the second half of 1941 and again in 1943 had failed to convert them". Evans 2008, p. 561.)

=== Oppression of ethnic Poles ===
Poles were viewed by Nazis as subhuman non-Aryans, and during the German occupation of Poland 2.7 million ethnic Poles died. Polish civilians were subject to forced labour in German industry, internment, wholesale expulsions to make way for German colonists, and mass executions. The German authorities engaged in a systematic effort to destroy Polish culture and national identity. During operation AB-Aktion, many university professors and members of the Polish intelligentsia were arrested, transported to concentration camps, or executed. During the war, Poland lost an estimated 39 to 45 per cent of its physicians and dentists, 26 to 57 per cent of its lawyers, 15 to 30 per cent of its teachers, 30 to 40 per cent of its scientists and university professors, and 18 to 28 per cent of its clergy.

=== Mistreatment of Soviet POWs ===
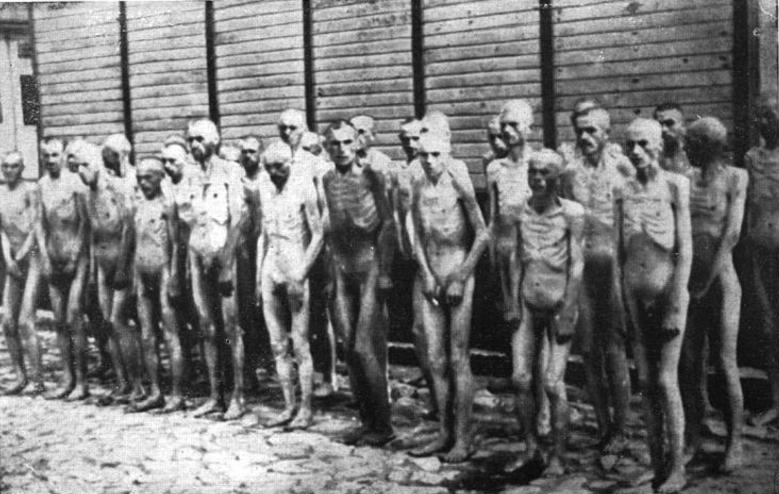
Soviet prisoners of war in Mauthausen

The Nazis captured 5.75 million Soviet prisoners of war, more than they took from all the other Allied powers combined. Of these, they killed an estimated 3.3 million, with 2.8 million of them being killed between June 1941 and January 1942. Many POWs starved to death or resorted to cannibalism while being held in open-air pens at Auschwitz and elsewhere.

From 1942 onward, Soviet POWs were viewed as a source of forced labour, and received better treatment so they could work. By December 1944, 750,000 Soviet POWs were working, including in German armaments factories (in violation of the Hague and Geneva conventions), mines, and farms.

== Society ==
=== Education ===
Antisemitic legislation passed in 1933 led to the removal of all Jewish teachers, professors, and officials from the education system. Most teachers were required to belong to the Nationalsozialistischer Lehrerbund (NSLB; National Socialist Teachers League) and university professors were required to join the National Socialist German Lecturers. Teachers had to take an oath of loyalty and obedience to Hitler, and those who failed to show sufficient conformity to party ideals were often reported by students or fellow teachers and dismissed. Lack of funding for salaries led to many teachers leaving the profession. The average class size increased from 37 in 1927 to 43 in 1938 due to the resulting teacher shortage.

Frequent and often contradictory directives were issued by Interior Minister Wilhelm Frick, Bernhard Rust of the Reich Ministry of Science, Education and Culture, and other agencies regarding content of lessons and acceptable textbooks for use in primary and secondary schools. Books deemed unacceptable to the regime were removed from school libraries. Indoctrination in Nazi ideology was made compulsory in January 1934. Students selected as future members of the party elite were indoctrinated from the age of 12 at Adolf Hitler Schools for primary education and National Political Institutes of Education for secondary education. Detailed indoctrination of future holders of elite military rank was undertaken at Order Castles.

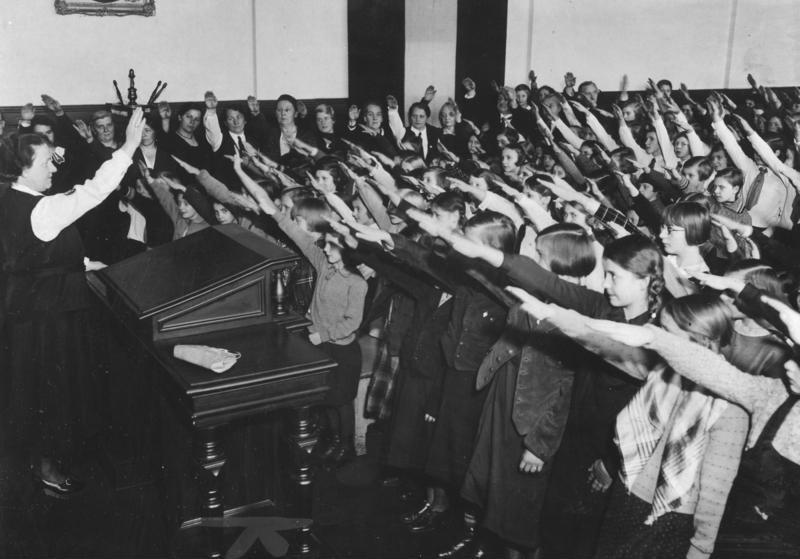
The Nazi salute in school (1934): children were indoctrinated at an early age.

Primary and secondary education focused on racial biology, population policy, culture, geography, and physical fitness. The curriculum in most subjects, including biology, geography, and even arithmetic, was altered to change the focus to race. Military education became the central component of physical education, and education in physics was oriented toward subjects with military applications, such as ballistics and aerodynamics. Students were required to watch all films prepared by the school division of the Reich Ministry of Public Enlightenment and Propaganda.

At universities, appointments to top posts were the subject of power struggles between the education ministry, the university boards, and the National Socialist German Students' League. In spite of pressure from the League and various government ministries, most university professors did not make changes to their lectures or syllabus during the Nazi period. This was especially true of universities located in predominantly Catholic regions. Enrolment at German universities declined from 104,000 students in 1931 to 41,000 in 1939, but enrolment in medical schools rose sharply as Jewish doctors had been forced to leave the profession, so medical graduates had good job prospects. From 1934, university students were required to attend frequent and time-consuming military training sessions run by the SA. First-year students also had to serve six months in a labour camp for the Reich Labour Service; an additional ten weeks service were required of second-year students.

=== Role of women and family ===
Women were a cornerstone of Nazi social policy. The Nazis opposed the feminist movement, claiming that it was the creation of Jewish intellectuals, instead advocating a patriarchal society in which the German woman would recognise that her "world is her husband, her family, her children, and her home". Feminist groups were shut down or incorporated into the National Socialist Women's League, which coordinated groups throughout the country to promote motherhood and household activities. Courses were offered on childrearing, sewing, and cooking. Prominent feminists, including Anita Augspurg, Lida Gustava Heymann, and Helene Stöcker, felt forced to live in exile. The League published the NS-Frauen-Warte, the only Nazi-approved women's magazine in Nazi Germany; despite some propaganda aspects, it was predominantly an ordinary woman's magazine.

Women were encouraged to leave the workforce, and the creation of large families by racially suitable women was promoted through propaganda campaigns. Women received a bronze award—known as the Ehrenkreuz der Deutschen Mutter (Cross of Honour of the German Mother)—for giving birth to four children, silver for six, and gold for eight or more. Large families received subsidies to help with expenses. Though the measures led to increases in the birth rate, the number of families having four or more children declined by five per cent between 1935 and 1940. Removing women from the workforce did not have the intended effect of freeing up jobs for men, as women were for the most part employed as domestic servants, weavers, or in the food and drink industries—jobs that were not of interest to men. Nazi philosophy prevented large numbers of women from being hired to work in munitions factories in the build-up to the war, so foreign labourers were brought in. After the war started, slave labourers were extensively used. In January 1943, Hitler signed a decree requiring all women under the age of fifty to report for work assignments to help the war effort. Thereafter women were funnelled into agricultural and industrial jobs, and by September 1944 14.9 million women were working in munitions production.

Nazi leaders endorsed the idea that rational and theoretical work was alien to a woman's nature, and as such discouraged women from seeking higher education. A law passed in April 1933 limited the number of women admitted to university to ten per cent of the number of men. This resulted in female enrolment in secondary schools dropping from 437,000 in 1926 to 205,000 in 1937. The number of women enrolled in post-secondary schools dropped from 128,000 in 1933 to 51,000 in 1938. However, with the requirement that men be enlisted into the armed forces during the war, women comprised half of the enrolment in the post-secondary system by 1944.

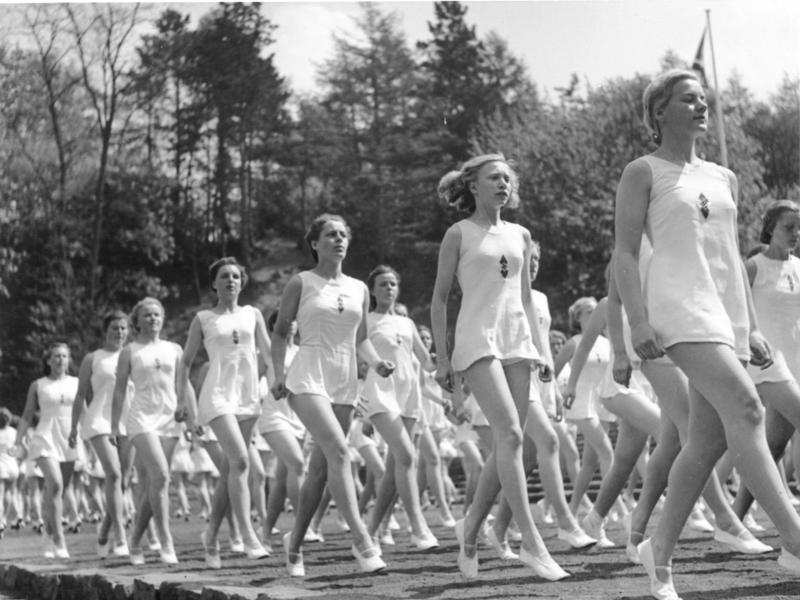
Young women of the Bund Deutscher Mädel (League of German Girls) practising gymnastics in 1941

Women were expected to be strong, healthy, vital, feminine, and submissive. The sturdy peasant woman who worked the land and bore strong children was considered the ideal, and women were praised for being athletic and tanned from working outdoors. Organisations were created for the indoctrination of Nazi values. From 25 March 1939 membership in the Hitler Youth was made compulsory for all children over the age of ten. The Jungmädelbund (Young Girls League) section of the Hitler Youth was for girls age 10 to 14, and the Bund Deutscher Mädel (BDM; League of German Girls) for young women age 14 to 18. The BDM's activities focused on physical education.

Pamphlets enjoined German women to avoid sexual relations with foreign workers as a danger to their blood, and sexual relations between foreign men and German women were heavily punished. In the case of prisoners of war, the death sentence could be issued.

The regime supported a conservative code of conduct in sexual matters, and regarded sexual liberation as a Jewish phenomenon. Homosexuals and others who were sexually different were persecuted, prostitution was banned (although German military brothels were introduced during wartime), and pornography was outlawed as a moral danger. Women wearing high heels, immodest clothes, and make-up were classified as decadent, while traditional and modest clothing was promoted. Although nudism was frowned upon, non-sexualized nude art—particularly in the classical Greco-Roman style—was prominent. After the Nazi seizure of power, births out of wedlock dropped dramatically.

With Hitler's approval, Himmler intended that the new society of the Nazi regime should destigmatise illegitimate children, particularly of children fathered by members of the SS, who were vetted for racial purity. His hope was that each SS family would have between four and six children. The Lebensborn (Fountain of Life) association, founded by Himmler in 1935, created a series of maternity homes to accommodate single mothers during their pregnancies. Both parents were examined for racial suitability before acceptance. The resulting children were often adopted into SS families. The homes were also made available to the wives of SS and Nazi Party members, who quickly filled over half the available spots.

Existing laws banning abortion except for medical reasons were strictly enforced by the Nazi regime, and much harsher penalties were introduced for those aborting babies, including the death sentence in 1943. The number of abortions declined from 35,000 per year at the start of the 1930s to fewer than 2,000 per year at the end of the decade, though in 1935 a law was passed allowing abortions for eugenics reasons.

=== Health ===
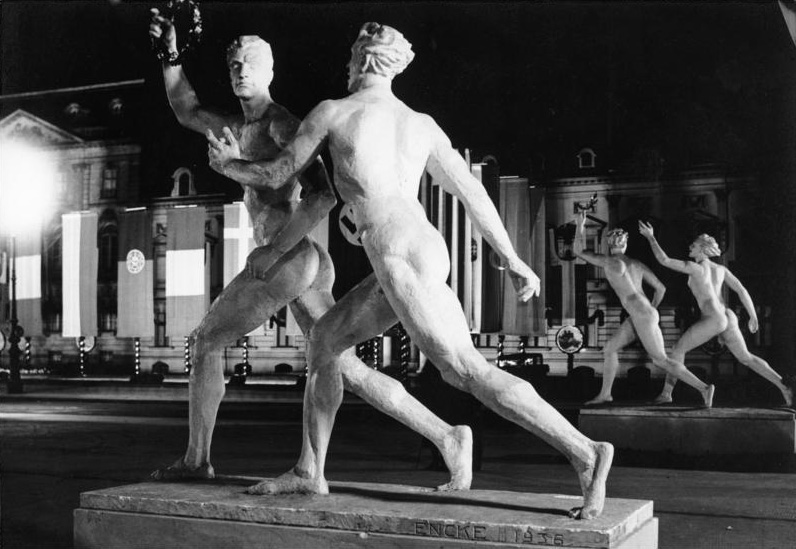
Statues representing the ideal body were erected in the streets of Berlin for the 1936 Summer Olympics.

Nazi Germany had a strong anti-tobacco movement, as pioneering research by Franz H. Müller in 1939 demonstrated a causal link between smoking and lung cancer. The Reich Health Office took measures to try to limit smoking, including producing lectures and pamphlets. Smoking was banned in many workplaces, on trains, and among on-duty members of the military. Government agencies also worked to control other carcinogenic substances such as asbestos and pesticides. As part of a general public health campaign, water supplies were cleaned up, lead and mercury were removed from consumer products, and women were urged to undergo regular screenings for breast cancer.

Government-run health care insurance plans were available, but Jews were denied coverage starting in 1933. That same year, Jewish doctors were forbidden to treat government-insured patients. In 1937, Jewish doctors were forbidden to treat non-Jewish patients, and in 1938 their right to practise medicine was removed entirely.

Medical experiments, many of them pseudoscientific, were performed on concentration camp inmates beginning in 1941. The most notorious doctor to perform medical experiments was SS-Hauptsturmführer Josef Mengele, camp doctor at Auschwitz. Many of his victims died. Concentration camp inmates were made available for purchase by pharmaceutical companies for drug testing and other experiments.

=== Environmentalism ===
Nazi society had elements supportive of animal rights and many people were fond of zoos and wildlife. The government took several measures to ensure the protection of animals and the environment. In 1933 the Nazis enacted a stringent animal-protection law that affected what was allowed for medical research. The law was only loosely enforced, and in spite of a ban on vivisection, the Ministry of the Interior readily handed out permits for experiments on animals.

The Reich Forestry Office under Göring enforced regulations that required foresters to plant a variety of trees to ensure suitable habitat for wildlife, and a new Reich Animal Protection Act became law in 1933. The regime enacted the Reich Nature Protection Act in 1935 to protect the natural landscape from excessive economic development. It allowed for the expropriation of privately owned land to create nature preserves and aided in long-range planning. Perfunctory efforts were made to curb air pollution, but little enforcement was undertaken once the war began.

=== Religion ===
When the Nazis seized power in 1933, roughly 67 per cent of the population of Germany was Protestant, 33 per cent was Roman Catholic, while Jews made up less than 1 per cent. According to the 1939 census, taken following the annexation of Austria, 54 per cent of the population considered themselves Protestant, 40 per cent Roman Catholic, 3.5 per cent Gottgläubig (God-believing; a Nazi religious movement) and 1.5 per cent nonreligious. Nazi Germany extensively employed Christian imagery and instituted a variety of new Christian celebrations, such as a massive celebration marking the 1200th anniversary of the birth of the Frankish emperor Charlemagne, who Christianised neighbouring continental Germanic peoples by force. Nazi propaganda stylised Hitler as a Christ-like messiah, a "figure of redemption according to the Christian model", "who would liberate the world from the Antichrist".

Under the Gleichschaltung process, Hitler attempted to create a unified Protestant Reich Church from Germany's 28 existing Protestant state churches. The pro-Nazi Ludwig Müller was installed as Reich Bishop and the pro-Nazi pressure group German Christians gained control of the new church. They objected to the Old Testament because of its Jewish origins and demanded that converted Jews be barred from their church. Pastor Martin Niemöller responded with the formation of the Confessing Church, from which some clergymen opposed the Nazi regime. When in 1935 the Confessing Church synod protested the Nazi policy on religion, 700 of their pastors were arrested. Müller resigned and Hitler appointed Hanns Kerrl as Minister for Church Affairs to continue efforts to control Protestantism. In 1936, a Confessing Church envoy protested to Hitler against the religious persecutions and human rights abuses. Hundreds more pastors were arrested. The church continued to resist and by early 1937 Hitler abandoned his hope of uniting the Protestant churches. Niemöller was arrested on 1 July 1937 and spent most of the next seven years in Sachsenhausen concentration camp and Dachau. Theological universities were closed and pastors and theologians of other Protestant denominations were also arrested.

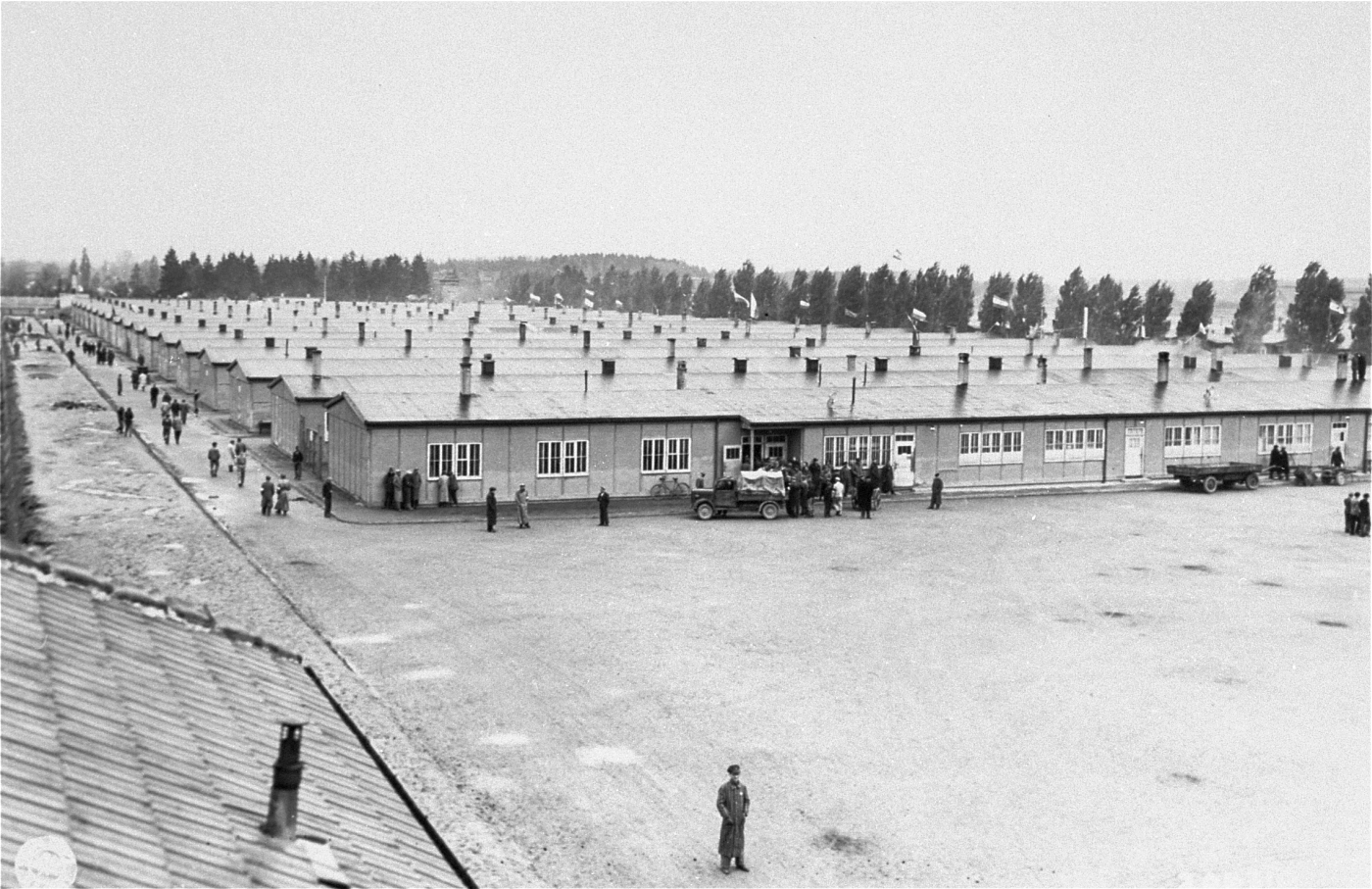
Prisoner barracks at Dachau Concentration Camp, where the Nazis established a dedicated clergy barracks for clerical opponents of the regime in 1940

Persecution of the Catholic Church in Germany followed the Nazi takeover. Hitler moved quickly to eliminate political Catholicism, rounding up functionaries of the Catholic-aligned Bavarian People's Party and Catholic Centre Party, which along with all other non-Nazi political parties ceased to exist by July. The Reichskonkordat (Reich Concordat) treaty with the Vatican was signed in 1933, amid continuing harassment of the church in Germany. The treaty required the regime to honour the independence of Catholic institutions and prohibited clergy from involvement in politics. Hitler routinely disregarded the Concordat, closing all Catholic institutions whose functions were not strictly religious. Clergy, nuns and lay leaders were targeted, with thousands of arrests over the ensuing years, often on trumped-up charges of currency smuggling or immorality. Several Catholic leaders were targeted in the 1934 Night of the Long Knives assassinations. Most Catholic youth groups refused to dissolve themselves and Hitler Youth leader Baldur von Schirach encouraged members to attack Catholic boys in the streets. Propaganda campaigns claimed the church was corrupt, restrictions were placed on public meetings and Catholic publications faced censorship. Catholic schools were required to reduce religious instruction and crucifixes were removed from state buildings.

Pope Pius XI had the "Mit brennender Sorge" ("With Burning Concern") encyclical smuggled into Germany for Passion Sunday 1937 and read from every pulpit as it denounced the systematic hostility of the regime toward the church. In response, Goebbels renewed the regime's crackdown and propaganda against Catholics. Enrolment in denominational schools dropped sharply and by 1939 all such schools were disbanded or converted to public facilities. Later Catholic protests included the 22 March 1942 pastoral letter by the German bishops on "The Struggle against Christianity and the Church". About 30 per cent of Catholic priests were disciplined by police during the Nazi era. A vast security network spied on clergy and priests were frequently denounced, arrested or sent to concentration camps – many to the dedicated clergy barracks at Dachau. In the areas of Poland annexed in 1939, the Nazis instigated a brutal suppression and systematic dismantling of the Catholic Church.

Alfred Rosenberg, head of the Nazi Party Office of Foreign Affairs and Hitler's appointed cultural and educational leader for Nazi Germany, considered Catholicism to be among the Nazis' chief enemies. He planned the "extermination of the foreign Christian faiths imported into Germany", and for the Bible and Christian cross to be replaced in all churches, cathedrals, and chapels with copies of Mein Kampf and the swastika. Other sects of Christianity were also targeted, with Chief of the Nazi Party Chancellery Martin Bormann publicly proclaiming in 1941, "National Socialism and Christianity are irreconcilable."

== Culture ==
If the experience of the Third Reich teaches us anything, it is that a love of great music, great art and great literature does not provide people with any kind of moral or political immunization against violence, atrocity, or subservience to dictatorship.

— Richard J. Evans, The Coming of the Third Reich (2003)

The regime promoted the concept of Volksgemeinschaft, a national German ethnic community. The goal was to build a classless society based on racial purity and the perceived need to prepare for warfare, conquest and a struggle against Marxism. The German Labour Front founded the Kraft durch Freude (KdF; Strength Through Joy) organisation in 1933. As well as taking control of tens of thousands of privately run recreational clubs, it offered highly regimented holidays and entertainment such as cruises, vacation destinations and concerts.

The Reich Chamber of Culture was organised under the control of the Propaganda Ministry in September 1933. Sub-chambers were set up to control aspects of cultural life such as film, radio, newspapers, fine arts, music, theatre, and literature. Members of these professions were required to join their respective organisation. Jews and people considered politically unreliable were prevented from working in the arts, and many emigrated. Books and scripts had to be approved by the Propaganda Ministry prior to publication. For example, the Reich Chamber of Literature regulated 3,000 authors, 2,500 publishers, 23,000 bookshops, and around 50 national literary prizes at the start of the war. Germany saw the publication of 20,000 new titles annually, then the highest in Europe. Mein Kampf, the bestseller by Hitler, was present in most households but was seldom actually read. Standards deteriorated as the regime sought to use cultural outlets exclusively as propaganda.

Radio became popular in Germany during the 1930s; over 70 per cent of households owned a receiver by 1939, more than any other country. By July 1933, radio station staffs were purged of leftists and others deemed undesirable. Propaganda and speeches were typical radio fare immediately after the seizure of power, but as time went on Goebbels insisted more music should be played so that listeners would not turn to foreign broadcasters for entertainment.

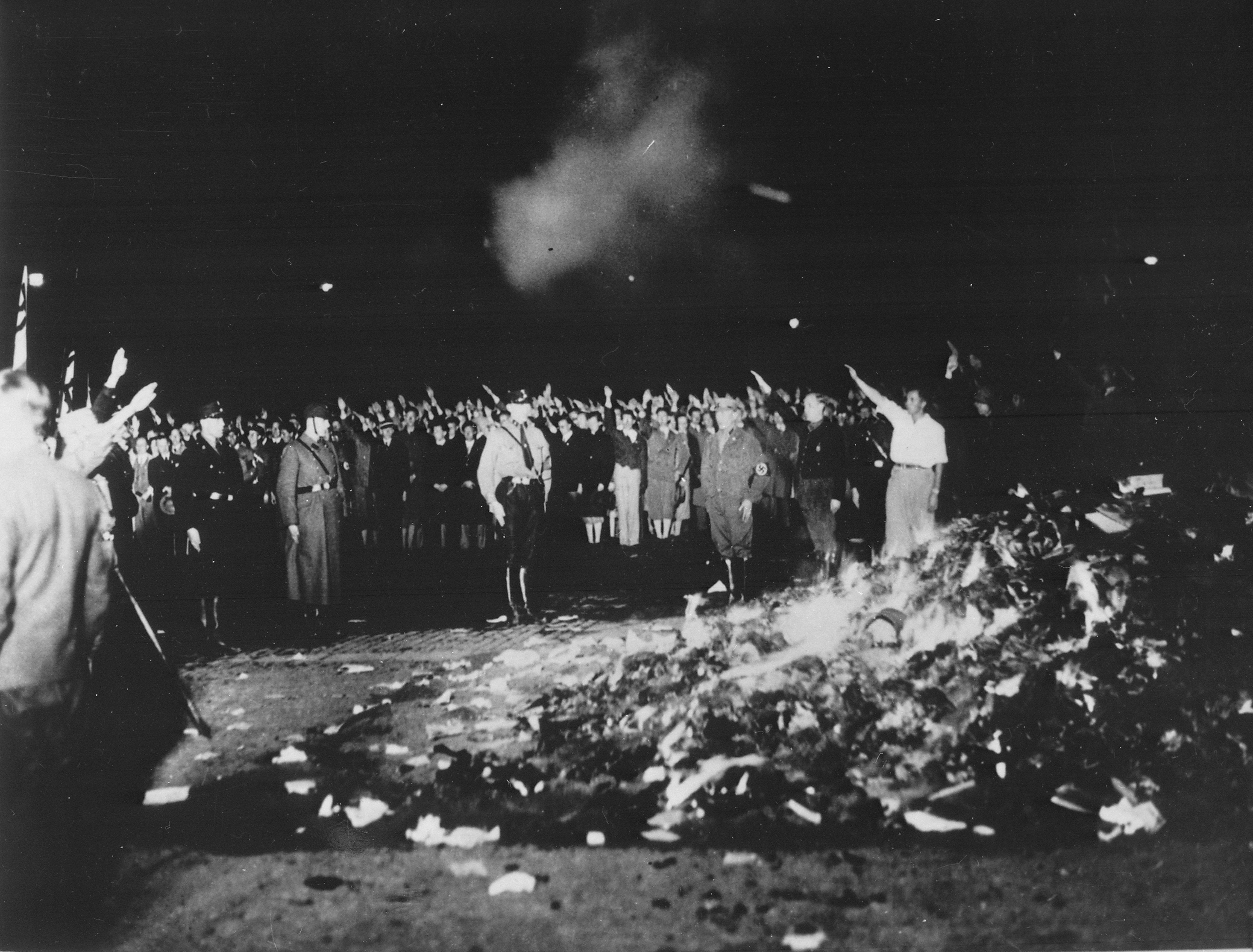
A Nazi book burning on 10 May 1933 in Berlin, as books by Jewish and leftist authors are burnt

=== Censorship ===
Newspapers, like other media, were controlled by the state; the Reich Press Chamber shut down or bought newspapers and publishing houses. By 1939 over two-thirds of the newspapers and magazines were directly owned by the Propaganda Ministry. The Nazi Party daily newspaper, the Völkischer Beobachter ("Ethnic Observer"), was edited by Rosenberg. Goebbels controlled the wire services and insisted that all newspapers in Germany should only publish content favourable to the regime. Under Goebbels, the Propaganda Ministry issued two dozen directives every week on exactly what news should be published and what angles to use; the typical newspaper followed the directives closely, especially regarding what to omit. Newspaper readership plummeted, partly because of the perceived decreased quality of the content and partly because of the surge in popularity of radio. Propaganda became less effective towards the end of the war, as people were able to obtain information outside official channels.

Many authors left the country and some wrote material critical of the regime while in exile. Goebbels recommended that the remaining authors should concentrate on books themed on Germanic myths and the concept of blood and soil. By the end of 1933 over a thousand books—most of them by Jewish authors or featuring Jewish characters—had been banned by the Nazi regime. Nazi book burnings took place; nineteen such events were held on the night of 10 May 1933. Tens of thousands of books from dozens of figures, including Albert Einstein, Sigmund Freud, Helen Keller, Alfred Kerr, Marcel Proust, Erich Maria Remarque, Upton Sinclair, Jakob Wassermann, H. G. Wells, and Émile Zola were publicly burnt. Pacifist works, and literature espousing liberal, democratic values were targeted for destruction, as well as any writings supporting the Weimar Republic or those written by Jewish authors.

=== Architecture and art ===
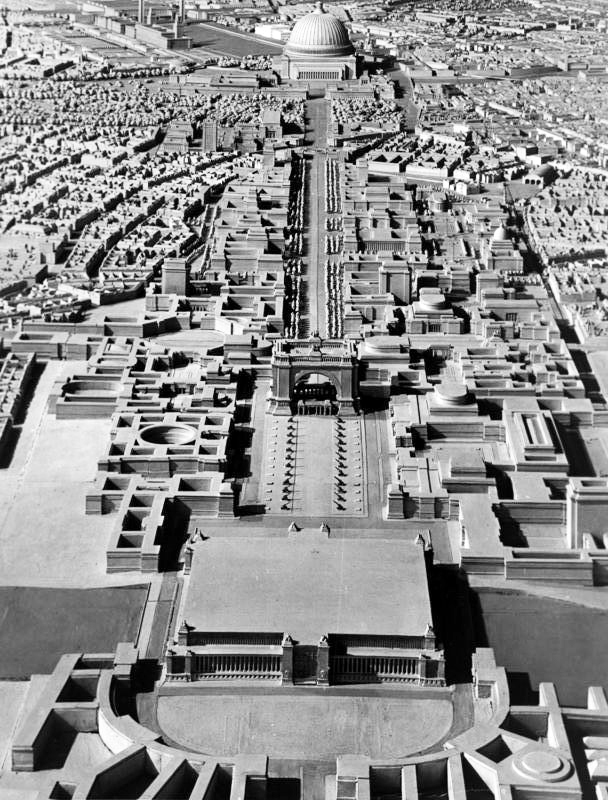
Plans for Berlin called for the Volkshalle (People's Hall) and a triumphal arch to be built at either end of a wide boulevard.

Hitler took a personal interest in architecture and worked closely with the state architects Paul Troost and Albert Speer to create public buildings in a neoclassical style based on Roman architecture. Speer constructed imposing structures such as the Nazi party rally grounds in Nuremberg and a new Reich Chancellery building in Berlin. Hitler's plans for rebuilding Berlin included a gigantic dome based on the Pantheon in Rome and a triumphal arch more than double the height of the Arc de Triomphe in Paris. Neither structure was built.

Hitler's belief that abstract, Dadaist, expressionist and modern art were decadent became the basis for policy. Many art museum directors lost their posts in 1933 and were replaced by party members. Some 6,500 modern works of art were removed from museums and replaced with works chosen by a Nazi jury. Exhibitions of the rejected pieces, under titles such as "Decadence in Art", were launched in sixteen different cities by 1935. The Degenerate Art Exhibition, organised by Goebbels, ran in Munich from July to November 1937. The exhibition proved wildly popular, attracting over two million visitors.

The composer Richard Strauss was appointed president of the Reichsmusikkammer (Reich Music Chamber) on its founding in November 1933. As was the case with other art forms, the Nazis ostracised musicians who were deemed racially unacceptable and for the most part disapproved of music that was too modern or atonal. Jazz was considered especially inappropriate and foreign jazz musicians left the country or were expelled. Hitler favoured the music of Richard Wagner, especially pieces based on Germanic myths and heroic stories, and attended the Bayreuth Festival each year from 1933 to 1942.

=== Film ===
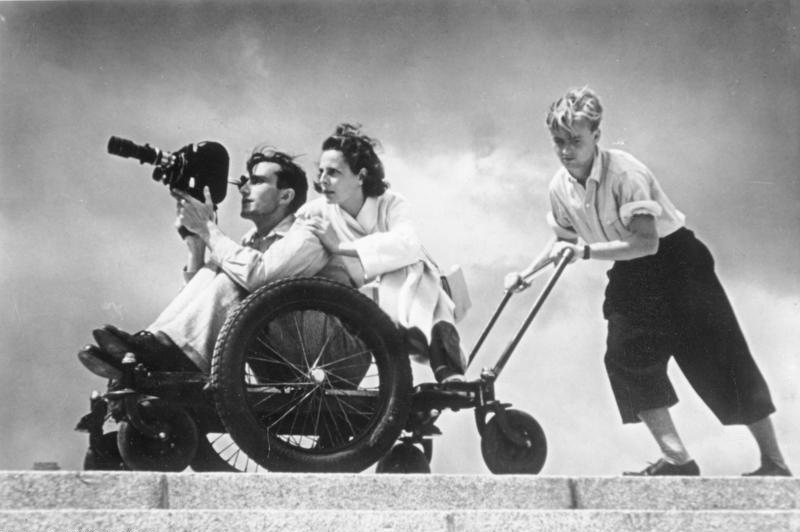
Leni Riefenstahl (behind cameraman) at the 1936 Summer Olympics

Movies were popular in Germany in the 1930s and 1940s, with admissions of over a billion people in 1942, 1943, and 1944. By 1934, German regulations restricting currency exports made it impossible for US filmmakers to take their profits back to America, so the major film studios closed their German branches. Exports of German films plummeted, as their antisemitic content made them impossible to show in other countries. The two largest film companies, Universum Film AG and Tobis, were purchased by the Propaganda Ministry, which by 1939 was producing most German films. The productions were not always overtly propagandistic, but generally had a political subtext and followed party lines regarding themes and content. Scripts were pre-censored.

Leni Riefenstahl's Triumph of the Will (1935)—documenting the 1934 Nuremberg Rally—and Olympia (1938)—covering the 1936 Summer Olympics—pioneered techniques of camera movement and editing that influenced later films. New techniques such as telephoto lenses and cameras mounted on tracks were employed. Both films remain controversial, as their aesthetic merit is inseparable from their propagandising of Nazi ideals.

== Legacy ==
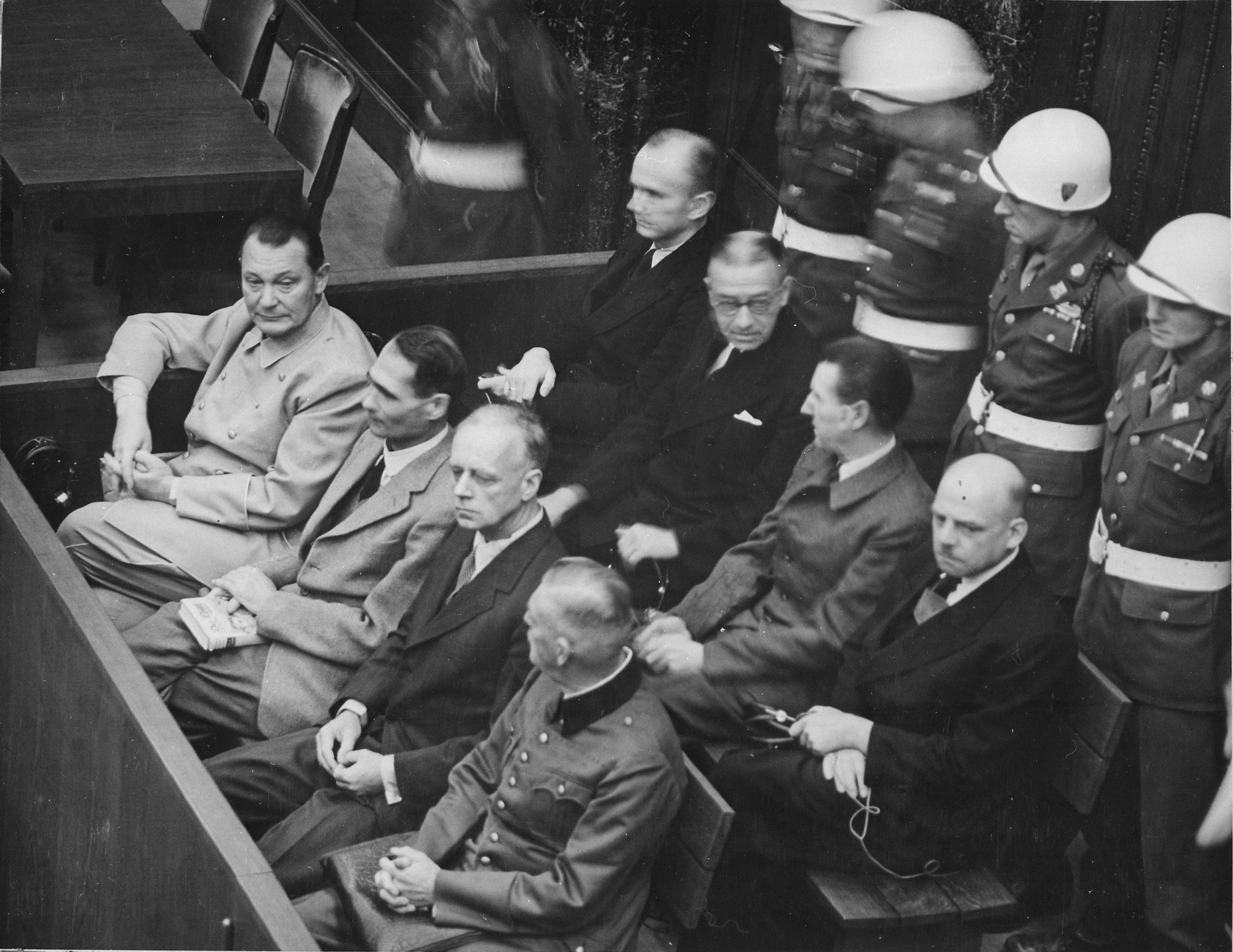
Defendants in the dock at the Nuremberg trials

The Allied powers organised war crimes trials, beginning with the Nuremberg trials, held from November 1945 to October 1946, of 23 top Nazi officials. They were charged with conspiracy to commit crimes, crimes against peace, war crimes and crimes against humanity. All but three were found guilty and twelve were sentenced to death. Twelve subsequent Nuremberg trials of 184 defendants were held between 1946 and 1949. Between 1946 and 1949, the Allies investigated 3,887 cases, of which 489 were brought to trial. The result was convictions of 1,426 people; 297 of these were sentenced to death and 279 to life in prison, with the remainder receiving lesser sentences. About 65 per cent of the death sentences were carried out. Poland was more active than other nations in investigating war crimes, for example prosecuting 673 of the total 789 Auschwitz staff brought to trial.

The political programme espoused by Hitler and the Nazis brought about a world war, leaving behind a devastated and impoverished Europe. Germany itself suffered wholesale destruction, characterised as Stunde Null (Zero Hour). The number of civilians killed during the Second World War was unprecedented in the history of warfare. As a result, Nazi ideology and the actions taken by the regime are almost universally regarded as gravely immoral. Historians, philosophers, and politicians often use the word "evil" to describe Hitler and the Nazi regime. Interest in Nazi Germany continues in the media and the academic world. While Evans remarks that the era "exerts an almost universal appeal because its murderous racism stands as a warning to the whole of humanity", young neo-Nazis enjoy the shock value that Nazi symbols or slogans provide. The display or use of Nazi symbolism is illegal in Germany and Austria.

Nazi Germany was succeeded by three states: West Germany (the Federal Republic of Germany or "FRG"), East Germany (the German Democratic Republic or "GDR"), and Austria. The process of denazification initiated by the Allies was only partially successful, as the need for experts in such fields as medicine and engineering was too great. However, expression of Nazi views was frowned upon, and those who expressed such views were frequently dismissed from their jobs. From the immediate post-war period through the 1950s, Germans kept quiet about their wartime experiences and felt a sense of communal guilt.

The trial of Adolf Eichmann in 1961 and the broadcast of the television miniseries Holocaust in 1978 brought the process of Vergangenheitsbewältigung (coping with the past) to the forefront for many Germans. Once study of Nazi Germany was introduced into the school curriculum starting in the 1970s, people began researching the experiences of their family members. Study of the era and a willingness to critically examine its mistakes has led to the development of a strong democracy in Germany, but with lingering undercurrents of antisemitism and neo-Nazi thought.

In 2017, a Körber Foundation survey found that 47 per cent of 14- to 16-year-olds polled knew what Auschwitz was. The journalist Alan Posener attributed the country's "growing historical amnesia" in part to a failure by German film and television to reflect the country's history accurately.

== See also ==
- Collaboration with the Axis powers – Stance in occupied countries in World War II
- European interwar dictatorships – List of dictatorships in Europe between World War I and World War II
- Glossary of Nazi Germany
- List of Nazi Party leaders and officials
- Nazi songs – Songs created or used by the Nazi Party
- Orders, decorations, and medals of Nazi Germany
- Persecution of homosexuals in Nazi Germany
- Sonderweg – Theory in German historiography

== Bibliography ==
- Bartrop, Paul R.; Jacobs, Leonard, eds. (2014). "Einsatzgruppen". Modern Genocide: The Definitive Resource and Document Collection. Vol. 1. Santa Barbara, CA: ABC-CLIO. ISBN 978-1-61069-363-9.
- Beevor, Antony (2002). Berlin: The Downfall 1945. London: Viking-Penguin Books. ISBN 978-0-670-03041-5.
- Beevor, Antony (2012). The Second World War. New York: Little, Brown. ISBN 978-0-316-02374-0.
- Bendersky, Joseph W. (2007). A Concise History of Nazi Germany: 1919–1945. Lanham, MD: Rowman & Littlefield. ISBN 978-0-7425-5363-7.
- Berben, Paul (1975). Dachau 1933–1945: The Official History. London: Norfolk Press. ISBN 978-0-85211-009-6.
- Bergen, Doris (2016). War & Genocide: A Concise History of the Holocaust (Third ed.). Lanham, MD: Rowman & Littlefield. ISBN 978-1-44224-228-9.
- Berghahn, Volker R. (1999). "Germans and Poles, 1871–1945". In Bullivant, Keith; Giles, Geoffrey; Pape, Walter (eds.). Germany and Eastern Europe: Cultural Identities and Cultural Differences. Yearbook of European Studies. Amsterdam; Atlanta, GA: Rodopi. ISBN 978-90-420-0688-1.
- Beyer, John C.; Schneider, Stephen A., Forced Labour under the Third Reich – Part 1 (PDF), Nathan Associates, archived from the original (PDF) on 9 May 2013.
- Browning, Christopher (2005). The Origins of the Final Solution: The Evolution of Nazi Jewish Policy, September 1939 – March 1942. UK: Arrow. ISBN 978-0-8032-5979-9.
- Busse, Reinhard; Riesberg, Annette (2004), Health Care Systems in Transition: Germany (PDF), Copenhagen: WHO Regional Office for Europe on behalf of the European Observatory on Health Systems and Policies, archived from the original (PDF) on 21 March 2020.
- Butzer, Hermann (2003). "Das "Dritte Reich" im Dritten Reich: Der Topos "Drittes Reich" in der nationalsozialistischen Ideologie und Staatslehre". Der Staat (in German). 42 (4/2003): 600–627. JSTOR 43643554. Archived from the original on 5 June 2023.
- Bytwerk, Randall (1998). "Goebbels' 1943 Speech on Total War". German Propaganda Archive. Calvin University. Archived from the original on 22 July 2019.
- Carlston, Erin G. (1998). Thinking Fascism: Sapphic Modernism and Fascist Modernity. Stanford, CA: Stanford University Press. ISBN 978-0-8047-4167-5.
- Childers, Thomas (2001). "Racial Policy and the Totalitarian State". A History of Hitler's Empire, 2nd Edition. Episode 7. The Great Courses. Event occurs at 12:20–12:41. Archived from the original on 27 March 2023.
- Childers, Thomas (2017). The Third Reich: A History of Nazi Germany. New York: Simon & Schuster. ISBN 978-1-45165-113-3.
- Clark, Lloyd (2012). Kursk: The Greatest Battle: Eastern Front 1943. London: Headline Review. ISBN 978-0-7553-3639-5.
- Closmann, Charles (2005). "Legalizing a Volksgemeinschaft: Nazi Germany's Reich Nature Protection Law of 1935". In Brüggemeier, Franz-Josef; Cioc, Mark; Zeller, Thomas (eds.). How Green Were the Nazis?: Nature, Environment, and Nation in the Third Reich. Athens, Ohio: Ohio University Press. ISBN 978-0-8214-1646-4.
- Constable, George, ed. (1988). Fists of Steel. The Third Reich. Alexandria, VA: Time-Life Books. ISBN 978-0-8094-6966-6.
- Conway, John S (2001). The Nazi Persecution of the Churches, 1933–1945. Vancouver: Regent College Publishing. ISBN 978-1-57383-080-5.
- Cuomo, Glenn R. (1995). National Socialist Cultural Policy. New York: Palgrave MacMillan. ISBN 978-0-312-09094-4.
- Davies, Norman (2003). Rising '44: the Battle for Warsaw. New York: Viking. ISBN 978-0-670-03284-6.
- Davis, Richard G. (1995). "German Rail Yards and Cities: U.S. Bombing Policy 1944–1945". Air Power History. 42 (2): 46–63. ISSN 1044-016X.
- DeGregori, Thomas R. (2002). Bountiful Harvest: Technology, Food Safety, and the Environment. Washington: Cato Institute. ISBN 978-1-930865-31-0.
- DeLong, J. Bradford (February 1997). "Slouching Towards Utopia?: The Economic History of the Twentieth Century. XV. Nazis and Soviets". econ161.berkeley.edu. University of California at Berkeley. Archived from the original on 11 May 2008.
- Die Bevölkerung des Deutschen Reichs nach den Ergebnissen der Volkszählung 1939 [Population of the German Realm according to the 1939 census], 1941.
- Dönitz, Karl (2012) [1958]. Memoirs: Ten Years and Twenty Days. London: Frontline. ISBN 978-1-84832-644-6.
- Dorland, Michael (2009). Cadaverland: Inventing a Pathology of Catastrophe for Holocaust Survival: The Limits of Medical Knowledge and Memory in France. Tauber Institute for the Study of European Jewry series. Waltham, Mass: University Press of New England. ISBN 978-1-58465-784-2.
- Dussel, Konrad (2010). "Wie erfolgreich war die nationalsozlalistische Presselenkung?" [How Successful was National Socialist Control of the Daily Press?] (PDF). Vierteljahrshefte für Zeitgeschichte [Contemporary History Quarterly] (in German). 58 (4). Institute of Contemporary History (Munich): 543–561. doi:10.1524/vfzg.2010.0026. S2CID 147376008. Archived (PDF) from the original on 23 January 2023.(subscription required)
- Elvert, Jürgen (1999). Mitteleuropa!: deutsche Pläne zur europäischen Neuordnung (1918–1945) (in German). Verlag Wiesbaden GmbH. ISBN 3-515-07641-7.
- Encyklopedia Powszechna PWN (in Polish). Vol. 3. Warsaw: Państwowe Wydawnictwo Naukowe. 2004. ISBN 978-83-01-14179-0.
- Ericksen, Robert P.; Heschel, Susannah (1999). Betrayal: German Churches and the Holocaust. Minneapolis: Augsburg Fortress Publishers. ISBN 978-0-8006-2931-1.
- ""Euthanasie" im Nationalsozialismus". Das Bundesarchiv (in German). Government of Germany. 2012. Archived from the original on 21 October 2013.
- Evans, Hilary (1979). Harlots, Whores & Hookers: A History of Prostitution. New York: Taplinger. ISBN 978-0-8008-2119-7.
- Evans, Richard J. (2003). The Coming of the Third Reich. New York: Penguin. ISBN 978-0-14-303469-8.
- Evans, Richard J. (2005). The Third Reich in Power. New York: Penguin. ISBN 978-0-14-303790-3.
- Evans, Richard J. (2008). The Third Reich at War. New York: Penguin. ISBN 978-0-14-311671-4.
- Evans, Richard J. (2009). Cosmopolitan Islanders: British Historians and the European Continent. Cambridge; New York: Cambridge University Press. ISBN 978-0-521-19998-8.
- Farago, Ladislas (1972) [1942]. German Psychological Warfare. International Propaganda and Communications. New York: Arno Press. ISBN 978-0-405-04747-3.
- Fest, Joachim (1996). Plotting Hitler's Death: The German Resistance to Hitler 1933–1945. London: Weidenfeld & Nicolson. ISBN 978-0-297-81774-1.
- Fest, Joachim (1999). Speer: The Final Verdict. Translated by Osers, Ewald; Dring, Alexandra. San Diego: Harcourt. ISBN 978-0-15-100556-7.
- Fischer, Klaus P. (1995). Nazi Germany: A New History. London: Constable and Company. ISBN 978-0-09-474910-8.
- Fleming, Michael (Spring 2014). "Allied Knowledge of Auschwitz: A (Further) Challenge to the 'Elusiveness' Narrative". Holocaust and Genocide Studies. 28 (1). Center for Advanced Holocaust Studies and Oxford University Press: 31–57. doi:10.1093/hgs/dcu014. S2CID 143736579.
- Freeman, Michael J. (1995). Atlas of Nazi Germany: A Political, Economic, and Social Anatomy of the Third Reich. London; New York: Longman. ISBN 978-0-582-23924-1.
- Friedländer, Saul (2009). Nazi Germany and the Jews, 1933–1945. New York: Harper Perennial. ISBN 978-0-06-135027-6.
- Gellately, Robert (1996). "Reviewed work(s): Vom Generalplan Ost zum Generalsiedlungsplan by Czeslaw Madajczyk. Der "Generalplan Ost". Hauptlinien der nationalsozialistischen Planungs- und Vernichtungspolitik by Mechtild Rössler; Sabine Schleiermacher". Central European History. 29 (2): 270–274. doi:10.1017/S0008938900013170.
- Gellately, Robert (2001). Social Outsiders in Nazi Germany. Princeton, NJ: Princeton University Press. ISBN 978-0-691-08684-2.
- Germany (West) Presse- und Informationsamt (1961). Germany Reports. With an introduction by Konrad Adenauer (in German). Wiesbaden: F. Steiner. OCLC 5092689.
- Gill, Anton (1994). An Honourable Defeat: A History of the German Resistance to Hitler. London: Heinemann.
- Glantz, David M. (1995). When Titans Clashed: How the Red Army Stopped Hitler. Lawrence, KS: University Press of Kansas. ISBN 978-0-7006-0899-7.
- Goebel, Nicole (28 September 2017). "Auschwitz-Birkenau: 4 out of 10 German students don't know what it was". Deutsche Welle. Archived from the original on 28 September 2017.
- Goeschel, Christian (2009). Suicide in Nazi Germany. Oxford; New York: Oxford University Press. ISBN 978-0-19-953256-8.
- Goldhagen, Daniel (1996). Hitler's Willing Executioners: Ordinary Germans and the Holocaust. New York: Knopf. ISBN 978-0-679-44695-8.
- Grunberger, Richard (1971). The 12-Year Reich: A Social History of Nazi Germany 1933–1945. New York: Holt Rinehart and Winston. ISBN 978-0-03-076435-6.
- Guenther, Irene (2004). Nazi Chic: Fashioning Women in the Third Reich. Oxford: Berg. ISBN 978-1-85973-400-1.
- Hamblet, Wendy C. (2008). "Book Review: Götz Aly: Hitler's Beneficiaries: Plunder, Racial War, and the Nazi Welfare State". Genocide Studies and Prevention. 3 (2). University of Toronto Press: 267–268. doi:10.1353/gsp.2011.0076. S2CID 143661188.
- Hanauske-Abel, Hartmut M. (7 December 1996). "Not a slippery slope or sudden subversion: German medicine and National Socialism in 1933" (PDF). The BMJ. 313 (7070). British Medical Association: 1453–1463. doi:10.1136/bmj.313.7070.1453. PMC 2352969. PMID 8973235. Archived from the original (PDF) on 17 April 2020.
- Harding, Thomas (23 August 2006). "Battle of Britain was won at sea. Discuss". The Telegraph. Archived from the original on 28 January 2020.
- Heinemann, Isabel; Oberkrome, Willi; Schleiermacher, Sabine; Wagner, Patrick (2006). Nauka, planowanie, wypędzenia : Generalny Plan Wschodni narodowych socjalistów : katalog wystawy Niemieckiej Współnoty Badawczej (PDF) (in Polish). Bonn: Deutsche Forschungsgemeinschaft. Archived from the original (PDF) on 2 April 2019.
- Hildebrand, Klaus (1984). The Third Reich. Boston: George Allen & Unwin. ISBN 978-0-04-943032-7.
- Hodgson, Jane E. (2014). Abortion and Sterilization: Medical and Social Aspects. Boston: Academic Press. ISBN 978-1-4832-2101-4.
- Hoffmann, Peter (1996) [1977]. The History of the German Resistance, 1933–1945. Montreal: McGill-Queen's University Press. ISBN 978-0-7735-1531-4.
- Hosking, Geoffrey A. (2006). Rulers and Victims: The Russians in the Soviet Union. Cambridge: Harvard University Press. ISBN 978-0-674-02178-5.
- Hubert, Michael (1998). Deutschland im Wandel. Geschichte der deutschen Bevolkerung seit 1815 (in German). Stuttgart: Steiner, Franz Verlag. ISBN 978-3-515-07392-9.
- Kershaw, Ian (2000b). Hitler, 1936–1945: Nemesis. New York; London: W. W. Norton & Company. ISBN 978-0-393-32252-1.
- Kershaw, Ian (2000a). The Nazi Dictatorship: Problems and Perspectives of Interpretation (4th ed.). London: Arnold. ISBN 978-0-340-76028-4.
- Kershaw, Ian (2001) [1987]. The "Hitler Myth": Image and Reality in the Third Reich. Oxford; New York: Oxford University Press. ISBN 978-0-19-280206-4.
- Kershaw, Ian (2008). Hitler: A Biography. New York: W. W. Norton & Company. ISBN 978-0-393-06757-6.
- Kershaw, Ian (2011). The End: Hitler's Germany, 1944–45. London; New York: Penguin. ISBN 978-1-59420-314-5.
- Kinobesuche in Deutschland 1925 bis 2004 (PDF) (in German), Spitzenorganisation der Filmwirtschaft e. V, archived from the original (PDF) on 4 February 2012.
- Kitchen, Martin (2006). A History of Modern Germany, 1800–2000. Malden, MA: Blackwell. ISBN 978-1-4051-0040-3.
- Koonz, Claudia (2003). The Nazi Conscience. Cambridge, MA: Belknap Press of Harvard University Press. ISBN 978-0-674-01172-4.
- Lakotta, Beate (March 2005). "Tief vergraben, nicht dran rühren". Der Spiegel (in German). No. 2. Hamburg: Spiegel-Verlag. pp. 218–221. Archived from the original on 17 April 2020.
- Lambert, Peter (2007). "Heroisation and Demonisation in the Third Reich: The Consensus-building Value of a Nazi Pantheon of Heroes". Totalitarian Movements and Political Religions. 8 (3–4): 523–546. doi:10.1080/14690760701571155. S2CID 144769526.
- Lauryssens, Stan (1999). The Man Who Invented the Third Reich: The Life and Times of Arthur Moeller van den Bruck. Stroud, England: Sutton. ISBN 978-0-7509-1866-4.
- Lee, Stephen J. (2016). European Dictatorships 1918-1945. Milton Park: Routledge. ISBN 978-1-317-29422-1.
- "Leni Riefenstahl". The Daily Telegraph. London. 10 September 2003. ISSN 0307-1235. OCLC 49632006. Archived from the original on 17 April 2020.
- Libionka, Dariusz. "The Catholic Church in Poland and the Holocaust, 1939–1945" (PDF). The Reaction of the Churches in Nazi Occupied Europe. Yad Vashem. Archived from the original (PDF) on 17 April 2020.
- Longerich, Peter (2003). "Hitler's Role in the Persecution of the Jews by the Nazi Regime". Holocaust Denial on Trial. Atlanta: Emory University. 17. Radicalisation of the Persecution of the Jews by Hitler at the Turn of the Year 1941–1942. Archived from the original on 9 July 2009.
- Longerich, Peter (2010). Holocaust: The Nazi Persecution and Murder of the Jews. Oxford; New York: Oxford University Press. ISBN 978-0-19-280436-5.
- Longerich, Peter (2012). Heinrich Himmler: A Life. Oxford; New York: Oxford University Press. ISBN 978-0-19-959232-6.
- Lukas, Richard C. (2001) [1994]. Did the Children Cry?: Hitler's War Against Jewish and Polish Children, 1939–1945. New York: Hippocrene. ISBN 978-0-7818-0870-5.
- Majer, Diemut (2003). "Non-Germans" under the Third Reich: The Nazi Judicial and Administrative System in Germany and Occupied Eastern Europe, with Special Regard to Occupied Poland, 1939–1945. Baltimore; London: Johns Hopkins University Press. ISBN 978-0-8018-6493-3.
- Manvell, Roger; Fraenkel, Heinrich (2007) [1965]. Heinrich Himmler: The Sinister Life of the Head of the SS and Gestapo. London; New York: Greenhill; Skyhorse. ISBN 978-1-60239-178-9.
- Marcuse, Harold (2001). Legacies of Dachau: The Uses and Abuses of a Concentration Camp, 1933-2001. Cambridge; New York: Cambridge University Press. ISBN 978-0-521-55204-2.
- Martin, Bernd (2005) [1995]. Japan and Germany in the Modern World. New York; Oxford: Berghahn Books. ISBN 978-1-84545-047-2.
- Mason, Timothy W. (1995). Nazism, Fascism and the Working Class. Cambridge, England: Cambridge University Press. ISBN 978-0-521-43787-5.
- Materski, Wojciech; Szarota, Tomasz (2009). Polska 1939–1945: straty osobowe i ofiary represji pod dwiema okupacjami [Poland 1939-1945: Human Losses and Victims of Repression Under the Two Occupations] (in Polish). Institute of National Remembrance. ISBN 978-83-7629-067-6.
- Mazower, Mark (2008). Hitler's Empire: How the Nazis Ruled Europe. New York; Toronto: Penguin. ISBN 978-1-59420-188-2.
- McElligott, Anthony; Kirk, Tim; Kershaw, Ian (2003). Working Towards the Führer: Essays in Honour of Sir Ian Kershaw. Manchester: Manchester University Press. ISBN 978-0-7190-6732-7.
- McLaughlin, Arthur J. Jr (2022). Art and the Nazis, 1933-1945: Looting, Propaganda and Seizure. Jefferson, NC: McFarland. ISBN 978-1-4766-4483-7.
- McNab, Chris (2009). The Third Reich. London: Amber Books. ISBN 978-1-906626-51-8.
- Melvin, Mungo (2010). Manstein: Hitler's Greatest General. London: Weidenfeld & Nicolson. ISBN 978-0-297-84561-4.
- Murray, Williamson; Millett, Allan R. (2001) [2000]. A War to be Won: Fighting the Second World War. Cambridge, MA: Belknap Press of Harvard University Press. ISBN 978-0-674-00680-5.
- Nakosteen, Mehdi Khan (1965). The History and Philosophy of Education. New York: Ronald Press. OCLC 175403.
- NS-Zwangsarbeit: "Verbotener Umgang" (in German), Stadtarchiv Göttingen Cordula Tollmien Projekt NS-Zwangsarbeiter, 1942, archived from the original on 17 April 2020.
- Nicholas, Lynn H. (2006). Cruel World: The Children of Europe in the Nazi Web. New York: Vintage. ISBN 978-0-679-77663-5.
- Niewyk, Donald L.; Nicosia, Francis R. (2000). The Columbia Guide to the Holocaust. New York: Columbia University Press. ISBN 978-0-231-11200-0.
- 'NS-Frauenwarte': Paper of the National Socialist Women's League, Heidelberg University Library, archived from the original on 17 April 2020.
- Nyrop, Richard F., ed. (1983). Federal Republic of Germany: A Country Study. Washington, DC: Headquarters, Department of the Army.
- Oberkommandos der Wehrmacht (1941). Soldaten Atlas (in German).
- Overmans, Rüdiger (2000) [1999]. Deutsche militärische Verluste im Zweiten Weltkrieg. Beiträge zur Militärgeschichte (in German). München: R. Oldenbourg. ISBN 978-3-486-56531-7.
- Overy, Richard (2005) [2004]. The Dictators: Hitler's Germany, Stalin's Russia. UK: Penguin Group. ISBN 978-0-393-02030-4.
- Overy, Richard (2006) [1995]. Why The Allies Won. London: Random House. ISBN 978-1-84595-065-1.
- Overy, Richard (2014). The Bombers and the Bombed: Allied Air War Over Europe 1940–1945. New York: Viking. ISBN 978-0-698-15138-3.
- Panayi, Panikos (2005). "Exploitation, Criminality, Resistance: The Everyday Life of Foreign Workers and Prisoners of War in the German Town of Osnabrück, 1939–49". Journal of Contemporary History. 40 (3): 483–502. doi:10.1177/0022009405054568. JSTOR 30036339. S2CID 159846665.
- Pauley, Bruce F. (2003) [1997]. Hitler, Stalin, and Mussolini: Totalitarianism in the Twentieth Century. European History Series. Wheeling, IL: Harlan Davidson. ISBN 978-0-88295-993-1.
- Petropoulos, Jonathan (2018). "Architecture and the Arts". In Robert Gellately (ed.). The Oxford Illustrated History of the Third Reich. New York: Oxford University Press. pp. 119–156. ISBN 978-0-19872-828-3.
- Pine, Lisa (2011) [2010]. Education in Nazi Germany. Oxford; New York: Berg. ISBN 978-1-84520-265-1.
- Posener, Alan (9 April 2018). "German TV Is Sanitizing History". Foreign Policy. Archived from the original on 20 July 2019.
- Proctor, Robert N. (1999). The Nazi War on Cancer. Princeton, NJ: Princeton University Press. ISBN 978-0-691-07051-3.
- Raeder, Erich (2001) [1956]. Grand Admiral: The Personal Memoir of the Commander in Chief of the German Navy From 1935 Until His Final Break With Hitler in 1943. New York: Da Capo Press. ISBN 978-0-306-80962-0.
- Rees, Laurence (2005). Auschwitz: A New History. New York: Public Affairs, member of Perseus Books Group. ISBN 978-1-58648-303-6.
- Reisner, Markus (February 2015). "Der Luftkrieg 1944/45 über Österreich". bundesheer.at (in German). Bundesministerium für Landesverteidigung. Archived from the original on 17 November 2021.
- Renzsch, Wolfgang (1989). "German Federalism in Historical Perspective: Federalism as a Substitute for a National State". Publius: The Journal of Federalism. 19 (4): 17–33. doi:10.1093/oxfordjournals.pubjof.a037817. ISSN 1747-7107.
- Rhodes, Richard (2002). Masters of Death: The SS-Einsatzgruppen and the Invention of the Holocaust. New York: Vintage Books. ISBN 978-0-375-70822-0.
- Richter, Heinz A. (1998). Greece in World War II (in Greek). transl by Kostas Sarropoulos. Athens: Govostis. ISBN 978-960-270-789-0.
- Rummel, Rudolph (1994). Death by Government. New Brunswick, NJ: Transaction. ISBN 978-1-56000-145-4.
- Rupp, Leila J. (1978). Mobilizing Women for War: German and American Propaganda, 1939–1945. Princeton, N.J.: Princeton University Press. ISBN 978-0-691-04649-5. OCLC 3379930.
- Scheck, Raffael (2021). Love Between Enemies: Western Prisoners of War and German Women in World War II. Cambridge, UK: Cambridge University Press. ISBN 978-1-108-84175-7.
- Schreiner, Klaus (1998). "Messianism in the Weimar Republic". In Schäfer, Peter; Cohen, Mark (eds.). Toward the Millennium: Messianic Expectations from the Bible to Waco. Leiden: Brill. pp. 311–362. ISBN 90-04-11037-2.
- Scobie, Alexander (1990). Hitler's State Architecture: The Impact of Classical Antiquity. University Park: Pennsylvania State University Press. ISBN 978-0-271-00691-8.
- Sereny, Gitta (1996) [1995]. Albert Speer: His Battle With Truth. New York; Toronto: Random House. ISBN 978-0-679-76812-8.
- Sereny, Gitta (November 1999). "Stolen Children". Talk. Archived from the original on 13 January 2017.
- Shirer, William L. (1960). The Rise and Fall of the Third Reich. New York: Simon & Schuster. LCCN 60-6729.
- Stiftung Deutsches Historisches Museum. "Gerade auf LeMO gesehen: LeMO Kapitel: NS-Regime" (in German).
- Smith, J. W. (1994). The World's Wasted Wealth 2: Save Our Wealth, Save Our Environment. Cambria, CA: Institute for Economic Democracy. ISBN 978-0-9624423-2-2.
- Snyder, Timothy (2010). Bloodlands: Europe between Hitler and Stalin. New York: Basic Books. ISBN 978-0-465-00239-9.
- "Sonderbehandlung erfolgt durch Strang". Documents for National Socialism (in German). NS-Archiv. 1942. Archived from the original on 17 April 2020.
- Sontheimer, Michael (10 March 2005). "Germany's Nazi Past: Why Germans Can Never Escape Hitler's Shadow". Spiegel Online. Archived from the original on 17 April 2020.
- Speer, Albert (1971) [1969]. Inside the Third Reich. New York: Avon. ISBN 978-0-380-00071-5.
- Spielvogel, Jackson J. (2016) [2005]. Hitler and Nazi Germany: A History. Abingdon; New York: Taylor & Francis. ISBN 978-0-205-84678-8.
- Staff (28 September 2017). "Deutsche wollen aus Geschichte lernen" [Germans want to learn from history] (in German). Körber Foundation. Archived from the original on 12 January 2022.
- Staff (16 December 2015). "What the Führer means for Germans today". The Economist. Archived from the original on 15 April 2020.
- Statistisches Jahrbuch für die Bundesrepublik Deutschland (PDF) (in German). Statistisches Bundesamt. 2006. p. 34. Archived from the original (PDF) on 26 September 2007.
- Stein, George (2002) [1966]. The Waffen-SS: Hitler's Elite Guard at War 1939–1945. Cerberus Publishing. ISBN 978-1-84145-100-8.
- Steiner, Zara (2011). The Triumph of the Dark: European International History 1933–1939. Oxford; New York: Oxford University Press. ISBN 978-0-19-921200-2.
- Stephenson, Jill (2001). Women in Nazi Germany. London: Longman. ISBN 978-0-582-41836-3.
- Stolfi, Russel (March 1982). "Barbarossa Revisited: A Critical Reappraisal of the Opening Stages of the Russo-German Campaign (June–December 1941)". Journal of Modern History. 54 (1): 27–46. doi:10.1086/244076. hdl:10945/44218. S2CID 143690841.
- "Strafgesetzbuch, StGB", German Law Archive, 13 November 1998, archived from the original on 29 October 2019.
- Strüber, Henning (17 August 2018). "1943: Briten bombardieren Peenemünde". ndr.de (in German). Archived from the original on 8 February 2021.
- Tomasevich, Jozo (1975). War and Revolution in Yugoslavia, 1941–1945: The Chetniks. Stanford, CA: Stanford University Press. ISBN 978-0-8047-0857-9.
- Tooze, Adam (2006). The Wages of Destruction: The Making and Breaking of the Nazi Economy. New York; Toronto: Viking. ISBN 978-0-670-03826-8.
- Tümmler, Holger (2010). Hitlers Deutschland: Die Mächtigen des Dritten Reiches (in German). Wolfenbüttel: Melchior Verlag. ISBN 978-3-941555-88-4.
- Uekötter, Frank (2006). The Green and the Brown: A History of Conservation in Nazi Germany. Cambridge; New York: Cambridge University Press. ISBN 978-0-521-84819-0.
- Uekötter, Frank (2005). "Polycentrism in Full Swing: Air Pollution Control in Nazi Germany". In Brüggemeier, Franz-Josef; Cioc, Mark; Zeller, Thomas (eds.). How Green Were the Nazis?: Nature, Environment, and Nation in the Third Reich. Athens: Ohio University Press. ISBN 978-0-82144-196-1.
- Umbreit, Hans (2003). "Hitler's Europe: The German Sphere of Power". In Kroener, Bernhard; Müller, Rolf-Dieter; Umbreit, Hans (eds.). Germany and the Second World War, Vol. 5. Organization and Mobilization in the German Sphere of Power. Part 2: Wartime Administration, Economy, and Manpower Resources, 1942–1944/5. Oxford; New York: Oxford University Press. ISBN 978-0-19-820873-0.
- USHMM. "Children during the Holocaust". United States Holocaust Memorial Museum—Holocaust Encyclopedia. Archived from the original on 22 July 2018.
- USHMM. "Dachau". United States Holocaust Memorial Museum—Holocaust Encyclopedia. Archived from the original on 7 August 2018.
- USHMM. "Genocide of European Roma (Gypsies), 1939–1945". United States Holocaust Memorial Museum—Holocaust Encyclopedia. Archived from the original on 11 April 2020.
- USHMM. "The German Churches and the Nazi State". United States Holocaust Memorial Museum—Holocaust Encyclopedia. Archived from the original on 27 November 2015.
- USHMM. "Women in the Third Reich". United States Holocaust Memorial Museum—Holocaust Encyclopedia. Archived from the original on 26 February 2020.
- Walk, Joseph (1996). Das Sonderrecht für die Juden im NS-Staat: Eine Sammlung der gesetzlichen Maßnahmen und Rechtlinien, Inhalt und Bedeutung (in German) (2nd ed.). Heidelberg: Müller Verlag. ISBN 978-3-82521-889-8.
- Weale, Adrian (2012) [2010]. Army of Evil: A History of the SS. New York; Toronto: NAL Caliber (Penguin Group). ISBN 978-0-451-23791-0.
- Wedekind, Michael [in German] (2003). Nationalsozialistische Besatzungs – und Annexionspolitik in Norditalien 1943 bis 1945: Die Operationszonen "Alpenvorland" und "Adriatisches Küstenland" (in German). München: Oldenbourg Wissenschaftsverlag. ISBN 3-486-56650-4.
- Wegner, Bernd (1990). The Waffen-SS: Organization, Ideology and Function. Hoboken, NJ: Blackwell. ISBN 978-0-631-14073-3.
- Weikart, Richard (2009). Hitler's Ethic: The Nazi Pursuit of Evolutionary Progress. New York: Palgrave Macmillan. ISBN 978-1-349-38073-2.
- Weinberg, Gerhard L. (2010) [1970]. Hitler's Foreign Policy 1933–1939: The Road to World War II. New York: Enigma Books. ISBN 978-1-929631-91-9.
- Weinberg, Gerhard L. (2005) [1994]. A World at Arms: A Global History of World War II. Cambridge; Oxford: Cambridge University Press. ISBN 978-0-521-85316-3.
- Welch, David (2001). Hitler: Profile of a Dictator. London: Routledge. ISBN 978-0-415-25075-7.
- Wiederschein, Harald (21 July 2015). "Mythos Waffen-SS". Focus (in German). Archived from the original on 28 January 2020.
- Wüstenberg, Jenny; Art, David (May 2008). "Using the Past in the Nazi Successor States from 1945 to the Present". The Annals of the American Academy of Political and Social Science. 617 (1): 72–87. doi:10.1177/0002716207312762. ISSN 0002-7162. S2CID 145313351. Archived from the original on 27 April 2021.
- Wrobel, Peter (1999). "Warsaw Uprising 1944". The Devil's Playground: Poland in World War II. The Canadian Foundation for Polish Studies of the Polish Institute of Arts & Sciences, Price-Patterson Ltd. ISBN 978-0-96927-841-2.
