= German-occupied Europe =

Aspect of World War II

- 1938–1945
- Flag Emblem
- Anthem: Das Lied der Deutschen lit. 'The Song of the Germans'
- Map of Germany and all European territory under German occupation by August–September 1942, excluding puppet states: Germany (Note: Including the Protectorate of Bohemia and Moravia and the General Governorate for the Occupied Polish Region); Civilian-administered occupied territory; Military-administered occupied territory
- Capital: Berlin
- Official languages: German
- Reichskommissar
  - 1938–1945: Fritz Katzmann
- Reichsstatthalter
  - 1938–1945: Adolf Eichmann
  - 1940–1945: Heinrich Himmler
  - 1941–1945: Hermann Göring
- Historical era: Interbellum (until 1939); World War II (until 1945)
  - German annexation of Austria: 12 March 1938
  - German invasion of Poland: 1 September 1939
  - German invasion of the Soviet Union: 22 June 1941
  - Allied invasion of Italy: 3 September 1943
  - Soviet invasion of Germany: 13 January 1945
  - Western Allied invasion of Germany: 22 March 1945
  - Fall of Berlin: 2 May 1945
  - German Instrument of Surrender: 8 May 1945
  - Allied occupation of Germany: 5 June 1945

Area
- Total (1941): 3,300,000 km^{2} (1,300,000 sq mi)

Population
  - Total (1941): 238,000,000
- Currency: Reichsmark (ℛℳ)
Succeeded by
Allied-occupied Germany

Between 1938 and 1945, Nazi Germany occupied or controlled vast territories of Europe. Peaking in 1941–1942, Germany and the other Axis powers (namely Italy) were governing more than half of the entire continent's population through direct administration, civil occupation, and military occupation, as well as by establishing puppet states. Germany's expansionist campaigns under the Nazi Party of Adolf Hitler ultimately led to the beginning of World War II in 1939. Also inside some of these occupied states, particularly Poland, was a large network of Nazi camps that facilitated what would later become known as the Holocaust.

The Wehrmacht occupied European territory:

- as far north and east as Franz Josef Land in the Soviet Union
- as far south as Gavdos in Greece
- as far west as Ushant in France

German weather stations within Europe existed as far north as Schatzgräber in Franz Josef Land's Alexandra Land. Although the Kriegsmarine operated globally during World War II, it was chiefly focused on establishing and maintaining hegemony in the North Atlantic, especially the North Sea.

The Gestapo committed war crimes attempting to hold occupied Europe under Nazi control, and was deemed a criminal organization after the war.

== History ==
Several German-occupied countries initially entered World War II as Allies of the United Kingdom or the Soviet Union. Some were forced to surrender before the outbreak of the war such as Czechoslovakia; others like Poland (invaded on 1 September 1939) were conquered in battle and then occupied. In some cases, the legitimate governments went into exile, in other cases the governments-in-exile were formed by their citizens in other Allied countries. Some countries occupied by Nazi Germany were officially neutral. Others were former members of the Axis powers that were subsequently occupied by German forces, such as Italy and Hungary.

== Concentration camps ==
Part of German-occupied Europe
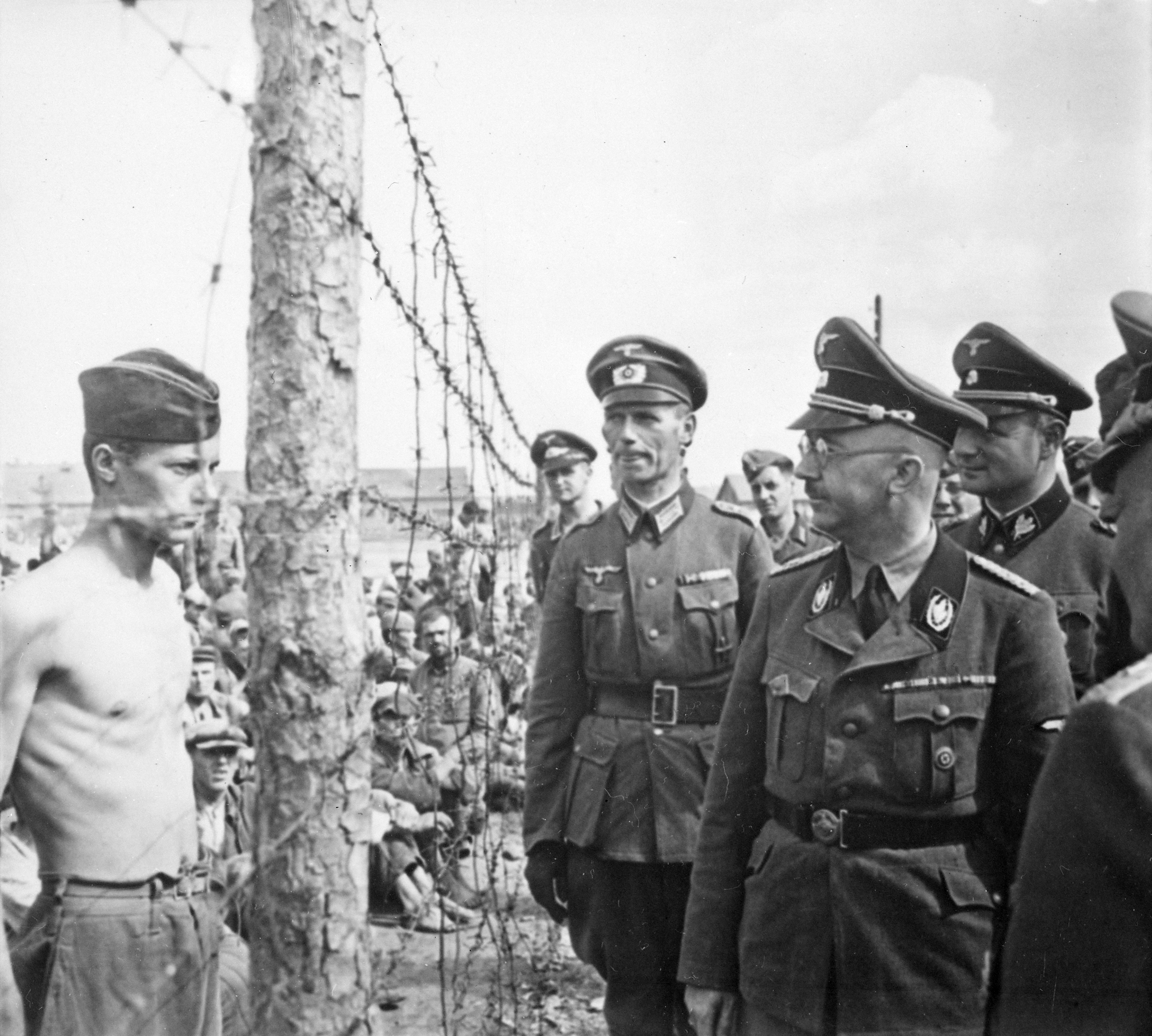
- Head of the SS, Heinrich Himmler, inspects captured prisoners in German occupied Minsk, August 1941.
- Date: 1941–1945
- Attack type: Starvation, death marches, executions, forced labor

Germany operated thousands of concentration camps in German-occupied Europe. The first camps were established in March 1933 immediately after Adolf Hitler became Chancellor of Germany. Following the 1934 purge of the Sturmabteilung (SA), the concentration camps were run exclusively by the Schutzstaffel (SS) via the Concentration Camps Inspectorate and later the SS Main Economic and Administrative Office. Initially, most prisoners were members of the Communist Party of Germany, but as time went on different groups were arrested, including "habitual criminals", "asocials", and Jews.

After the beginning of World War II, people from German-occupied Europe were imprisoned in the concentration camps. About 1.65 million people were registered prisoners in the camps, of whom about a million died during their imprisonment. Most of the fatalities occurred during the second half of World War II, including at least 4.7 million Soviet prisoners who were registered as of January 1945.

Following Allied military victories, the camps were gradually liberated in 1944 and 1945, although hundreds of thousands of prisoners died in the death marches.

After the expansion of Nazi Germany, people from countries occupied by the Wehrmacht were targeted and detained in concentration camps. In Western Europe, arrests focused on resistance fighters and saboteurs, but in Eastern Europe arrests included mass roundups aimed at the implementation of Nazi population policy and the forced recruitment of workers. This led to a predominance of Eastern Europeans, especially Poles, who made up the majority of the population of some camps. The ethnicities of captured people were various other groups from other different nationalities were transferred to Auschwitz or sent to local concentration camps.

== Occupied countries ==
The countries occupied included all, or most, of the following nations or territories:

Country or territory of occupation	Puppet state(s) or military administration(s)	Timeline of occupation(s)	German annexed or occupied territory	Resistance movement(s)
Albanian Kingdom	Albanian Kingdom	8 Sep 1943 – 29 Nov 1944	None	Albanian resistance
Bailiwick of Guernsey Bailiwick of Jersey	(Nazi Germany) German Occupied Channel Islands (Part of the Military Administration in France)	30 Jun 1940 – 9 May 1945 (Guernsey) 1 Jul 1940 – 9 May 1945 (Jersey)	None	Channel Islands resistance
(Czechoslovakia) First Czechoslovak Republic (Czechoslovakia) Second Czechoslovak Republic (Czechoslovakia) Third Czechoslovak Republic	Slovak Republic (Nazi Germany) German Zone of Protection in Slovakia	1 Oct 1938 – 11 May 1945	(Nazi Germany) Gau Bayreuth; Protectorate of Bohemia and Moravia (Nazi Germany) Reichsgau Niederdonau (Nazi Germany) Reichsgau Oberdonau (Nazi Germany) Reichsgau Sudetenland	Czechoslovak resistance
Federal State of Austria	Main article: Anschluss § End of an independent Austria None (Note: Although there was substantial popular support in Austria for some type of (re)unification with Germany, Chancellors Engelbert Dollfuss and his successor Kurt Schuschnigg wanted to maintain at least some type of independence. Dollfuss had implemented an authoritarian regime now termed Austrofascism, continued by Schussnigg, which imprisoned many members of the Austrian Nazi Party and the Social Democratic Party which both favored unification. Violence by Austrian Nazi Party members including the assassination of Dollfuss, along with German propaganda and ultimately threats of invasion by Adolf Hitler, eventually led Schuschnigg to capitulate and resign. Hitler, however, did not wait for his hand-picked successor, Austrian Nazi Arthur Seyss-Inquart, to be sworn in and ordered German troops to invade Austria at dawn on 12 Mar 1938, where they were met with cheering crowds and an Austrian army previously ordered not to resist.)	12 Mar 1938 – 9 May 1945	(Nazi Germany) Reichsgau Kärnten (Nazi Germany) Reichsgau Niederdonau (Nazi Germany) Reichsgau Oberdonau (Nazi Germany) Reichsgau Salzburg (Nazi Germany) Reichsgau Steiermark (Nazi Germany) Reichsgau Tirol-Vorarlberg (Nazi Germany) Reichsgau Wien	Austrian resistance
Free City of Danzig	None (Note: Upon request of its Nazi-dominated senate, the city was directly annexed to Germany along with the surrounding Polish Pomeranian Voivodeship.)	1 Sep 1939 – 9 May 1945	(Nazi Germany) Reichsgau Danzig-West Prussia	Danzigian resistance
French Republic Free France (France) Provisional Government of the French Republic French Tunisia	Military Administration in Belgium and Northern France Military Administration in France Reichskommissariat of Belgium and Northern France	10 May 1940 – 9 May 1945	Gau Baden; Gau Westmark; Reichsgau Wallonien	French resistance
Luxembourg	Military Administration of Luxembourg (Nazi Germany) Civil Administration Area of Luxembourg	10 May 1940 – Feb 1945	(Nazi Germany) Gau Moselland	Luxembourg resistance
(Kingdom of Italy) Italian Islands of the Aegean	(Italian Social Republic) Italian Islands of the Aegean	8 Sep 1943 – 8 May 1945	None	
Belgium	Military Administration in Belgium and Northern France (Nazi Germany) Reichskommissariat of Belgium and Northern France	10 May 1940 – 4 Feb 1945	(Nazi Germany) Gau Cologne-Aachen (Nazi Germany) Reichsgau Wallonien (Nazi Germany) Reichsgau Flandern	Belgian resistance
Denmark	Protectorate state	9 Apr 1940 – 5 May 1945	None	Danish resistance
Kingdom of Greece	(Nazi Germany) Military Administration in Greece: Hellenic State	6 Apr 1941 – 8 May 1945	None	Greek resistance
Kingdom of Hungary	Kingdom of Hungary: Government of National Unity	19 Mar 1944 – May 1945	None	Hungarian resistance
Kingdom of Italy	Italian Social Republic: (Nazi Germany) Operational Zone of the Adriatic Littoral; (Nazi Germany) Operational Zone of the Alpine Foothills	8 Sep 1943 – 2 May 1945	None	Italian resistance
Norway	(Nazi Germany) Reichskommissariat Norwegen: (Norway) National Government	9 Apr 1940 – 8 May 1945	None	Norwegian resistance
Netherlands	(Nazi Germany) Reichskommissariat Niederlande	10 May 1940 – 20 May 1945	None	Dutch resistance
Kingdom of Yugoslavia	Albanian Kingdom German-occupied territory of Montenegro Independent State of Croatia: German zone of influence; Independent State of Macedonia (Nazi Germany) Territory of the Military Commander in Serbia: Commissioner Government; Government of National Salvation	6 Apr 1941 – 15 May 1945	(Nazi Germany) Reichsgau Kärnten (Nazi Germany) Reichsgau Steiermark	Yugoslav resistance
Monaco	None	8 Sep 1943 – 3 Sep 1944	None	
Finland	None	15 Sep 1944 – 25 Apr 1945	None	Finnish resistance
Republic of Lithuania Provisional Government of Lithuania	(Nazi Germany) Reichskommissariat Ostland	22 Mar 1939 – 21 Jul 1940 23 Jun 1941 – 5 Aug 1941	(Nazi Germany) Gau East Prussia	Lithuanian resistance
Republic of Poland	(Nazi Germany) Military Administration in Poland (Nazi Germany) General Government administration (Nazi Germany) Reichskommissariat Ostland (Nazi Germany) Reichskommissariat Ukraine	1 Sep 1939 – 9 May 1945	(Nazi Germany) Bezirk Bialystok (Nazi Germany) Gau East Prussia (Nazi Germany) Gau Schlesien (Nazi Germany) Gau Oberschlesien (Nazi Germany) General Government (Nazi Germany) Reichsgau Danzig-West Prussia (Nazi Germany) Reichsgau Wartheland	Polish resistance
San Marino	None (military trespassing)	17 Sep 1944 – 20 Sep 1944	None	
(Nazi Germany) Territory of the Military Commander in Serbia	Commissioner Government Government of National Salvation	30 Apr 1941 – Jan 1945	None	Serbian resistance
Slovak Republic	(Nazi Germany) German Zone of Protection in Slovakia	23 Mar 1939 – May 1945	None	Slovak resistance
Territory of the Saar Basin	None. (Note: In a referendum in 1935, over 90% of residents supported reunification with Germany over remaining a League of Nations protectorate of France and the United Kingdom or joining France.)	1 Mar 1935 – Apr 1945	(Nazi Germany) Gau Palatinate-Saar (Nazi Germany) Gau Saar-Palatinate (Nazi Germany) Gau Westmark	Saar Basinian resistance
(Ukraine) Ukrainian National Government	(Nazi Germany) Reichskommissariat Ukraine	30 Jun 1941 – Sep 1941	(Nazi Germany) General Government	Ukrainian resistance
Parts of the Soviet Union	Lepel Republic (Nazi Germany) Military Administration in the Soviet Union: Lokot Autonomy; (Nazi Germany) Reichskommissariat Ostland (Nazi Germany) Reichskommissariat Ukraine	22 Jun 1941 – 10 May 1945	(Nazi Germany) Bezirk Bialystok (Nazi Germany) General Government	Soviet resistance

=== Governments in exile ===
==== Allied governments in exile ====
Government in exile	Capital in exile	Timeline of exile	Occupier(s)
(Austria) Austrian Democratic Union	(United Kingdom) London	1941–1945	(Nazi Germany) German Reich/Greater German Reich
Free France	(United Kingdom) London (1940–1941); Algiers, French Algeria (1942 – Aug 31, 1944)	1940 – Aug 31, 1944	French State (Nazi Germany) German Reich/Greater German Reich (Nazi Germany) Military Administration in Belgium and Northern France (Nazi Germany) Reichskommissariat of Belgium and Northern France
Government of the Republic of Poland in exile	(France) Paris (Sep 29/30, 1939 – 1940) (France) Angers, French Republic (1940 – Jun 12, 1940) (United Kingdom) London (Jun 12, 1940 – 1990)	Sep 29/30, 1939 – Dec 22, 1990	(Nazi Germany) German Reich/Greater German Reich (Nazi Germany) Reich Commissariat East (Nazi Germany) Reich Commissariat Ukraine; Slovak Republic; Soviet Union; People's Republic of Poland
Belgium	(United Kingdom) London (Oct 22, 1940 – Sep 8, 1944)	Oct 22, 1940 – Sep 8, 1944	(Nazi Germany) German Reich/Greater German Reich (Nazi Germany) Military Administration in Belgium and Northern France (Nazi Germany) Reichskommissariat of Belgium and Northern France
Denmark	None	1943–1945	(Nazi Germany) German Reich/Greater German Reich
Luxembourg	(United Kingdom) London	1940–1944	(Nazi Germany) German Reich/Greater German Reich
Kingdom of Greece	Cairo, Egypt	Apr 29, 1941 – Oct 12, 1944	(Nazi Germany) German Reich/Greater German Reich; Kingdom of Italy; Kingdom of Bulgaria
Norway	(United Kingdom) London	Jun 7, 1940 – May 31, 1945	(Nazi Germany) Reichskommissariat Norwegen
Kingdom of Yugoslavia	(United Kingdom) London	Jun 7, 1941 – Mar 7, 1945	Albanian Kingdom; Commissioner Government; German-occupied territory of Montenegro (Nazi Germany) German Reich/Greater German Reich; Government of National Salvation; Independent State of Croatia; Independent Macedonia; Kingdom of Bulgaria; Kingdom of Hungary (Nazi Germany) Territory of the Military Commander in Serbia
Netherlands	(United Kingdom) London	1940–1945	(Nazi Germany) Reichskommissariat Niederlande
Provisional Government of Czechoslovakia	(France) Paris (Oct 2, 1939 – 1940); London (1940–1941); Aston Abbotts, United Kingdom (1941–1945)	Oct 2, 1939 – Apr 2, 1945	(Nazi Germany) German Reich/Greater German Reich; Kingdom of Hungary; Slovak Republic

==== Axis governments in exile ====
Government in exile	Capital in exile	Timeline of exile	Occupier(s)
Kingdom of Bulgaria	(Nazi Germany) Vienna, Greater German Reich	Sep 16, 1944 – May 10, 1945	Kingdom of Bulgaria; Kingdom of Greece; Kingdom of Yugoslavia
(Vichy France) French State	(Nazi Germany) Sigmaringen, Greater German Reich	1944 – Apr 22, 1945	(France) Provisional Government of the French Republic
Kingdom of Hungary	(Nazi Germany) Vienna, Greater German Reich (Nazi Germany) Munich, Greater German Reich	Mar 28/29, 1945 – May 7, 1945	Czechoslovak Republic; Kingdom of Hungary; Kingdom of Romania; Kingdom of Yugoslavia
Kingdom of Romania	(Nazi Germany) Vienna, Greater German Reich	1944–1945	Kingdom of Romania
Montenegrin State Council	Zagreb, Independent State of Croatia	Summer of 1944 – May 8, 1945	Kingdom of Yugoslavia
Slovak Republic	(Nazi Germany) Kremsmünster, Great-German Reich	Apr 4, 1945 – 8 May 1945	Czechoslovak Republic
Government of National Salvation	(Nazi Germany) Kitzbühel, Great-German Reich	Oct 7, 1944 – 8 May 1945	Soviet Union

==== Neutral governments in exile ====
Government in exile	Capital in exile	Timeline of exile	Occupier(s)
(Belarus) Belarusian Democratic Republic	(Czechoslovakia) Prague, Czechoslovak Republic (1923–1938) (Czechoslovakia) Prague, Czecho-Slovak Republic (1938–1939) (Nazi Germany) Prague, German Reich/Greater German Reich (1939–1945)	1919 – present	(Nazi Germany) German Reich/Greater German Reich (Nazi Germany) Realm Commissariat East (Nazi Germany) Realm Commissariat Ukraine; Republic of Poland; Soviet Union
Republic of Estonia	Stockholm, Kingdom of Sweden (1944 – Aug 20, 1991) New York City, United States	Jun 17, 1940 – Aug 20, 1991	(Nazi Germany) Reichskommissariat Ostland; Soviet Union
Ukrainian People's Republic	Warsaw, Republic of Poland (1920–1939) (Nazi Germany) Prague, German Reich/Greater German Reich (1939–1944)	1920 – Aug 22, 1992	(Nazi Germany) German Reich/Greater German Reich; Kingdom of Hungary; Kingdom of Romania (Nazi Germany) Reichskommissariat Ukraine; Soviet Union

== See also ==
- Areas annexed by Nazi Germany
- Underground media in German-occupied Europe
- Drang nach Osten ("The Drive Eastward")
- Greater Germanic Reich
- Lebensraum ("Living Space")
- Neuordnung ("New Order")
- Pan-Germanism

== Bibliography ==
- Bank, Jan. Churches and Religion in the Second World War (Occupation in Europe) (2016).
- Gildea, Robert and Olivier Wieviorka. Surviving Hitler and Mussolini: Daily Life in Occupied Europe (2007).
- Klemann, Hein A.M. and Sergei Kudryashov, eds. Occupied Economies: An Economic History of Nazi-Occupied Europe, 1939–1945 (2011).
- Lagrou, Pieter. The Legacy of Nazi Occupation: Patriotic Memory and National Recovery in Western Europe, 1945–1965 (1999).
- Mazower, Mark (2008). Hitler's Empire: Nazi Rule in Occupied Europe. London: Allen Lane. ISBN 9780713996814.
- Scheck, Raffael; Fabien Théofilakis; and Julia S. Torrie, eds. German-occupied Europe in the Second World War (Routledge, 2019), 276 pp. online review.
- Snyder, Timothy. Bloodlands: Europe Between Hitler and Stalin (2010), on Eastern Europe.
- Toynbee, Arnold, ed. Survey of International Affairs, 1939–1946: Hitler's Europe (Oxford University Press, 1954), 730 pp. online review; full text online free.

=== Primary sources ===
- Carlyle Margaret, ed. Documents on International Affairs, 1939–1946. Volume II, Hitler's Europe (Oxford University Press, 1954), 362 pp.
