= Reichskommissar =

Gubernatorial title used in the German Empire and Nazi Germany

Reichskommissar (German: [ˈʁaɪçskɔmɪsaːɐ̯], rendered as "Commissioner of the Empire", "Reich Commissioner" or "Imperial Commissioner"), in German history, was an official gubernatorial title used for various public offices during the period of the German Empire and Nazi Germany.

== German Empire ==
=== Domestic ===
In the unified German Empire (after 1871), Reichskommissars were appointed to oversee special tasks. For instance, there was a Reichskommissar for emigration (Reichskommissar für das Auswanderungswesen) in Hamburg.

Presumably the same title is rendered as "German Imperial Commissioner" in the case of Heligoland, a strategically located once-Danish island in the North Sea, formally handed over to Germany by the UK on 9 August 1890 (under the Heligoland–Zanzibar Treaty) and on 15 December 1890 formally annexed to Germany (after 18 February 1891 part of the Prussian province of Schleswig-Holstein): 9 August 1890 – 1891 Adolf Wermuth (b. 1855 – d. 1927)

=== Colonial ===
The title of Reichskommissar was used during the German Empire for the governors of most of the Schutzgebiete (a German term literally meaning protectorate, but also applied to ordinary colonies).

==== In West Africa ====
- in Kamerun (modern-day Cameroon) * Reichskommissare (Commissioners)
  - 14 July 1884 – 19 July 1884 Gustav Nachtigal (b. 1834 – d. 1885)
  - 19 July 1884 – 1 April 1885 Maximilian Buchner (acting) (b. 1846 – d. 1921)
  - 1 April 1885 – 4 July 1885 Eduard von Knorr (acting) (b. 1840 – d. 1920); next came a list of governors until 4 March 1916 when *
- in Togo the Reich Reichskommissare since 5 July 1884 proclamation of the Togoland protectorate:
  - 5 July 1884 – 6 July 1884 Gustav Nachtigal (b. 1834 – d. 1885), the Reichskommissar for West Africa *
  - 6 July 1884 – 26 June 1885 Heinrich Randad, the provisional Consul
  - 26 June 1885 – May 1887 Ernst Falkenthal (b. 1858 – d. 1911)
  - July 1887 – 17 October 1888 Jesko von Puttkamer (acting) (1st time) (b. 1855 – d. 1917)
  - 17 October 1888 – 14 April 1891 Eugen von Zimmerer (b. 1843 – d. 1918)
  - 14 April 1891 – 4 June 1892 Vacant
  - 4 June 1892 – November 1893 Jesko von Puttkamer (2nd time); the same stayed on as the first of two Landeshauptleute ('Land captains'), until 13 August 1895; the second (18 November 1895 – 18 April 1898 August Köhler, b. 1858 – d. 1902) was also the first of the Governors (since 1 January 1905 as German colony of Togoland, until the British conquered it August 1914)

==== German South-West Africa ====
- from 24 April 1884 as German South West Africa protectorate, only incumbent (7 October 1884 – May 1885) Gustav Nachtigal (b. 1834 – d. 1885; see above), staying on shortly for the status transition
- from 30 April 1885 – 1889 under the rule of the private German South West Africa Colonial Company (Deutsche Kolonialgesellschaft für Südwest-Afrika), only incumbent (May 1885 – August 1890): Heinrich Ernst Göring (acting) (b. 1839 – d. 1913)
- again as imperial protectorate (?)
  - first the abovementioned Heinrich Ernst Göring, de facto staying on
  - August 1890 – March 1891 Louis Nels (acting) (b. 1855 – d. 1910)
  - March 1891 – November 1893 Curt von François (b. 1852 – d. 1931), who stayed on when the country was declared on 14 September 1892 the German crown colony of South West Africa, and later again as the first of two Landeshauptleute ("captains of the territory")

==== In East Africa ====
- in Tanganyika, the area acquired on 17 February 1885 by Carl Peters for the Deutsch-Ostafrikanische Gesellschaft (DOAG, 'German East Africa Company', that was initially under an Administrator: 27 May 1885 – 8 February 1888 Karl Peters), since the proclamation of the German East African protectorate (7 May 1885 – 1 July 1890) over Witu in Kenya; contested by Britain; on 28 April 1888 Germany obtains a lease of the coastal strip from the Sultan of Zanzibar), a single Reichskommissar is appointed (8 February 1888 – 21 February 1891: Hermann von Wissmann (b. 1853 – d. 1905), after him Governors of 1 January 1891 when proclaimed German East Africa colony (Deutsch Ostafrika), ending the 'private' DOAG rule.

==== In Oceania ====
- Nauru, since 21 October 1887 a German protectorate, was under the following Reichskommissare:
  - 1886 – 1887 Wilhelm Knappe (b. 1855 – d. 1910)
  - 1888 – 1889 Franz Leopold Sonnenschein (b. 1857 – d. 1897); next, as it was since 14 April 1888 administratively part of the (German) Marshall Islands, it had mere Bezirksamtleute (District officers; 2 October 1888 – 1906), then, being since 1 April 1906 administratively part of German New Guinea, Stationsleiter ('Station Chiefs'; from 1911, subordinated to the administrators of Ponape district) until 6 November 1914, finally the island was lost (Australian administration, first by a military Commander, then under League of Nations mandate)

== Nazi Germany ==
The title of Reichskommissar was given by Adolf Hitler to a number of Nazi governors, mainly in several occupied countries during World War II, but also before the war to reintegrate former Prussian territory regained from France, as well as various other regions inhabited by ethnic Germans. Depending on circumstances they could be severely dictatorial and repressive, most notably Erich Koch in Ukraine.

=== Domestic & annexed (ethnically German) ===
==== Saar Territory ====
A plebiscite was held in the Territory of the Saar Basin (presently Saarland) on 13 January 1935: 90.3% of those voting wished to join Germany rather than join France. Josef Bürckel (b. 1895 – d. 1944) was appointed on 1 March 1935 as Reichskommissar für die Rückgliederung des Saarlandes, then changed his style from 17 June 1936 to Reichskommissar für das Saarland, and from 8 April 1940 to Reichskommissar für die Saarpfalz; finally from 11 March 1941, he was made Reichsstatthalter in der "Westmark" (the region's new name, meaning "Western March or Border"), until his death on 28 September 1944 when he was succeeded by Willi Stöhr (b. 1903 also NSDAP), who remained in office until 21 March 1945.

==== Sudetenland ====
After the Sudetenland region of Czechoslovakia was annexed by Germany on 1 October 1938, it was under a Military governor (Wilhelm Keitel; 1 October 1938 – 20 October 1938), until Konrad Henlein was appointed Reichskommissar of the territories on 21 October 1938. On 1 May 1939 a regular 'domestic' Reichsgau, Reichsgau Sudetenland was created; Henlein stayed on as Reichsstatthalter until the region was re-incorporated into Czechoslovakia on 4 May 1945.

==== Vienna ====
1 May 1939 – 1 April 1940 Josef Bürckel (b. 1895 – d. 1944) NSDAP, in fact the maintained last Austrian Premier of 15 October 1938 constituted metropolitan capital city-entity Gross-Wien (Greater Vienna), is in transitional office, then the same is made the first of two Reichsstatthalter (he until 10 August 1940), equivalent to a Gauleiter in Germany proper.

=== Northern and Western Europe ===
==== Norway ====
After the Norwegian king and his government fled during the German invasion of the country and the failure of a coup d'état by the fascist politician Vidkun Quisling, Hitler appointed a Reichskommissar für die besetzten Norwegischen Gebiete (Reich Commissioner for the occupied Norwegian territories) on 24 April 1940. The office had two consecutive Reichskommissars with extensive authority:

- 24 April 1940 – 7 May 1945 – Josef Terboven, NSDAP. He took up residence in the Crown Prince's manor at Skaugum. Answerable only to Hitler, Terboven initially tried to negotiate with the Norwegian Storting to establish a civilian administration which would be willing to sign a peace treaty with Germany. After the collapse of these negotiations, Terboven on 25 September 1940 proclaimed the deposition of King Haakon VII and his cabinet-in-exile and outlawed all political parties except the Norwegian fascist party Nasjonal Samling. Terboven committed suicide during the night of 7 May 1945, just before the surrender of the German forces in Norway became effective.
- 7 May 1945 – 8 May 1945 – Franz Böhme, commander-in-chief of German military forces in Norway, assumed Terboven's responsibilities as acting Reichskommissar until Allied forces took control and had him arrested.

==== Netherlands ====
After the German invasion of the country and the Dutch government and crown's evacuation and exile, the Netherlands was placed under the command of two successive military governors:

- 10 May 1940 – 20 May 1940 – Fedor von Bock
- 20 May 1940 – 29 May 1940 – Alexander von Falkenhausen

The governorship was succeeded by a more permanent civil administration led by Reichskommissar für die besetzten niederländischen Gebiete (Reich Commissioner for the occupied Dutch territories):

- 29 May 1940 – 5 May 1945 – Arthur Seyss-Inquart, NSDAP

==== Belgium and Northern France ====
Belgium was initially placed under a Militärverwaltung, headed by military governors. The country was joined administratively to "North France", i.e. the adjacent French départements Nord and Pas-de-Calais. This was done both for security reasons and geopolitical ideology of expansionism: the area was to be used as a staging ground in an expected invasion of Britain, but also in order to prepare a future "re-claim" of French Flanders in Northern France as a historic part of Germanic Flanders. The Military Administration in Belgium and Northern France had two successive governors:

- 10 May 1940 – 1 June 1940 – Gerd von Rundstedt and Fedor von Bock
- 1 June 1940 – 18 July 1944 – Alexander Freiherr von Falkenhausen

This situation continued until July 1944, when a Reichskommissar für Belgien-Nordfrankreich was appointed:

- 18 July 1944 – January 1945 – Joseph Grohé NSDAP

In December 1944, when the Allies had already liberated virtually all of Belgium, its territory was split up into three Gau-type entities as integral ("Germanic") parts of the Reich: the bi-cultural Belgian capital Brussels remained directly under the German Reichskommissar as the District of Brussels, but the bulk of the country was divided ethno-linguistically and placed under collaborating Belgian fascist party leaders (on paper) as Gauleiters and with Führer-imitating titles in their national languages:

Gauleiter of Reichsgau Flandern (Flanders) supposedly including French Flanders in Allied-liberated North France, and National leader of the Flemish People (Dutch: Landsleider van het Vlaamsche Volk) as well as "Head of the Flemish Liberation Committee" (Hoofd van het Vlaamsche Bevrijdingscomité):

- 15 December 1944 – 1945 – Jef Van de Wiele (in Germany in exile; head of the Devlag party)

Gauleiter of Reichsgau Wallonien (Wallonia, and Leader of the Walloon People (French: Chef du Peuple Wallon):

- 8 December 1944 – 1945 – Léon Degrelle (also remained in Germany in exile, even though German troops reconquered part of Wallonia in December 1944 – January 1945); head of the Rexist Party)

=== Soviet territories ===
Before the beginning of Operation Barbarossa (the eastern front campaign against the Soviet Union) on 22 June 1941, the Nazi ideologist Alfred Rosenberg suggested the administrative division of conquered Soviet territory in the following Reichskommissariats, only the first two of which would become reality through military success:

- Ostland (the Baltic countries, Belarus, and adjacent parts of Western Russia);
- Ukraine (Ukraine and the northern parts of Southern Russia);
- Kaukasien (the Caucasus and the southern parts of Southern Russia);
- Moskowien (Moscow metropolitan area and the rest of nearest Russian European areas);
- Turkestan (the Central Asian Soviet republics, ethnically mainly Turkic).

This suggested an intention to destroy Russia as a political entity, as the Nazis organised the areas adjacent to Greater Germany's eastern provinces in accordance with the geopolitical Lebensraum idea (Drang nach Osten), to benefit future "Aryan" generations. When German forces entered Soviet territory, they immediately implemented this administrative plan instating the Reichskommissariat of "Ostland" in the Baltic lands and "Ukraine" in Ukraine, headed by Hinrich Lohse and Erich Koch respectively. These administrators put in practice the intended measures during the whole of their administrative period, until 1943–44, when the Germans after the Battle of Kursk were gradually driven out by force.

==== Ostland ====
On 17 July 1941, the Reichskommissariat Ostland ("Eastland") was established, soon uniting German-occupied Lithuania, Latvia (from 1 September 1941) and Estonia (from 5 December 1941) and Belarus. Ostland was organized into four General Districts (Generalbezirke); only the (Latvian) capital city of Riga (Gebiet Riga Stadt) was directly administered by the Reichskommissar für das Ostland. The incumbents were:

- 17 July 1941 – 26 September 1944 – Hinrich Lohse (b. 1896 – d. 1964), NSDAP
- 26 September 1944 – 2 February 1945 – Erich Koch (b. 1896 – d. 1986), NSDAP (de facto ousted on 13 October 1944 when the Soviet Red Army took Riga, although Ostland wasn't officially dissolved until 2 February 1945)

==== Ukraine ====
The territory in Ukraine occupied by Germany since 25 June 1941 initially fell under a military governor:

- 25 June 1941 – 31 August 1941 – Gerd von Rundstedt (b. 1875 – d. 1953)

The Reichskommissariat Ukraine was established on 20 August 1941, under a Reichskommissar für die Ukraine. The incumbents were:

- 20 August 1941 – 6 October 1943 – Erich Koch (b. 1896 – d. 1986), NSDAP
- 1942 – 30 September 1943 – Paul Dargel (acting for Koch) (b. 1903 – d. 19..), NSDAP
- October 1943 – 1944 – Curt von Gottberg (b. 1896 – d. 1945), NSDAP

==== Moskowien ====
Central Russia was never brought under sufficient German control to permit its transfer to civilian administration, but a designated Reichskommissar für Moskowien was appointed on 17 July 1941:

- Siegfried Kasche (b. 1903 – d. 1947), NSDAP

==== Kaukasien ====
The Caucasus was never brought under sufficient German control to permit its transfer to civilian administration, but a designated Reichskommissar für die Kaukasien was appointed on 17 July 1941:

- Arno Schickedanz (b. 1892 – d. 1945), NSDAP

== See also ==
- Generalgouverneur
- Reichsbevollmächtigter
- Reichsprotektor
- Reichskommissariat
