= DeVlag =

Pro-Nazi organization in Flanders, Belgium

DeVlag Deutsch-Vlämische Arbeitsgemeinschaft Duitsch-Vlaamsche Arbeidsgemeenschap
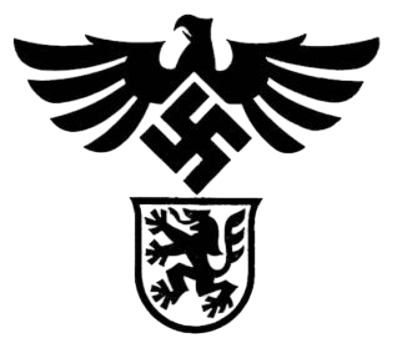
- Leader: Jef Van de Wiele; Rolf Wilkening
- President: Gottlob Berger
- Founded: 1936; 90 years ago
- Dissolved: 1945; 81 years ago
- Newspaper: De Gazet
- Paramilitary wing: Veiligheidskorps
- Membership: 50,000 (1943 est.)
- Ideology: Nazism; Pan-Germanism
- Political position: Far-right

The Deutsch-Vlämische Arbeitsgemeinschaft (German pronunciation: [ˈdɔɪtʃ ˈflɛːmɪʃə ˈaʁbaɪtsɡəˌmaɪnʃaft], "German-Flemish Working Group"; Dutch: Duitsch-Vlaamsche Arbeidsgemeenschap), better known as DeVlag, was a small radical pro-Nazi organization active in Flanders during the German occupation of Belgium. It was founded in 1936 by academics Jef Van de Wiele and Rolf Wilkening as a cultural association to strengthen the exchange of students and professors between the universities of Leuven and Cologne.

Its membership reached hundreds by the late 1930s. In May 1941, after the German invasion, DeVlag started receiving financial backing from the SS, and was reorganized into a Nazi organization. This was first done in secrecy. German SS-Obergruppenführer Gottlob Berger was later appointed as DeVlag's president, and the bond between the two organizations was thus made official.

DeVlag's orientation towards the SS brought it into a conflict with the Flemish National League (Vlaams Nationaal Verbond, VNV), the primary collaborationist organization in German-occupied Flanders, which had initially supported the "cultural" activities of DeVlag. The VNV was a Flemish nationalist movement, which envisioned an independent Flanders, or perhaps Dietsland, in a German-dominated Europe, while Van de Wiele considered Dutch merely a German dialect and the Flemish people a part of the German race. DeVlag saw Dutch or Flemish nationalism as provincialism, and supported the outright annexation of Flanders into the Greater German Reich. The VNV also had partly clerical roots, while the SS ideology endorsed by DeVlag held anti-Christian notions. While DeVlag was supported by the SS and worked closely with the Germaansche SS in Vlaanderen, the VNV received support from the Wehrmacht military occupation (Militärverwaltung) and from the head of the military government, Alexander von Falkenhausen.

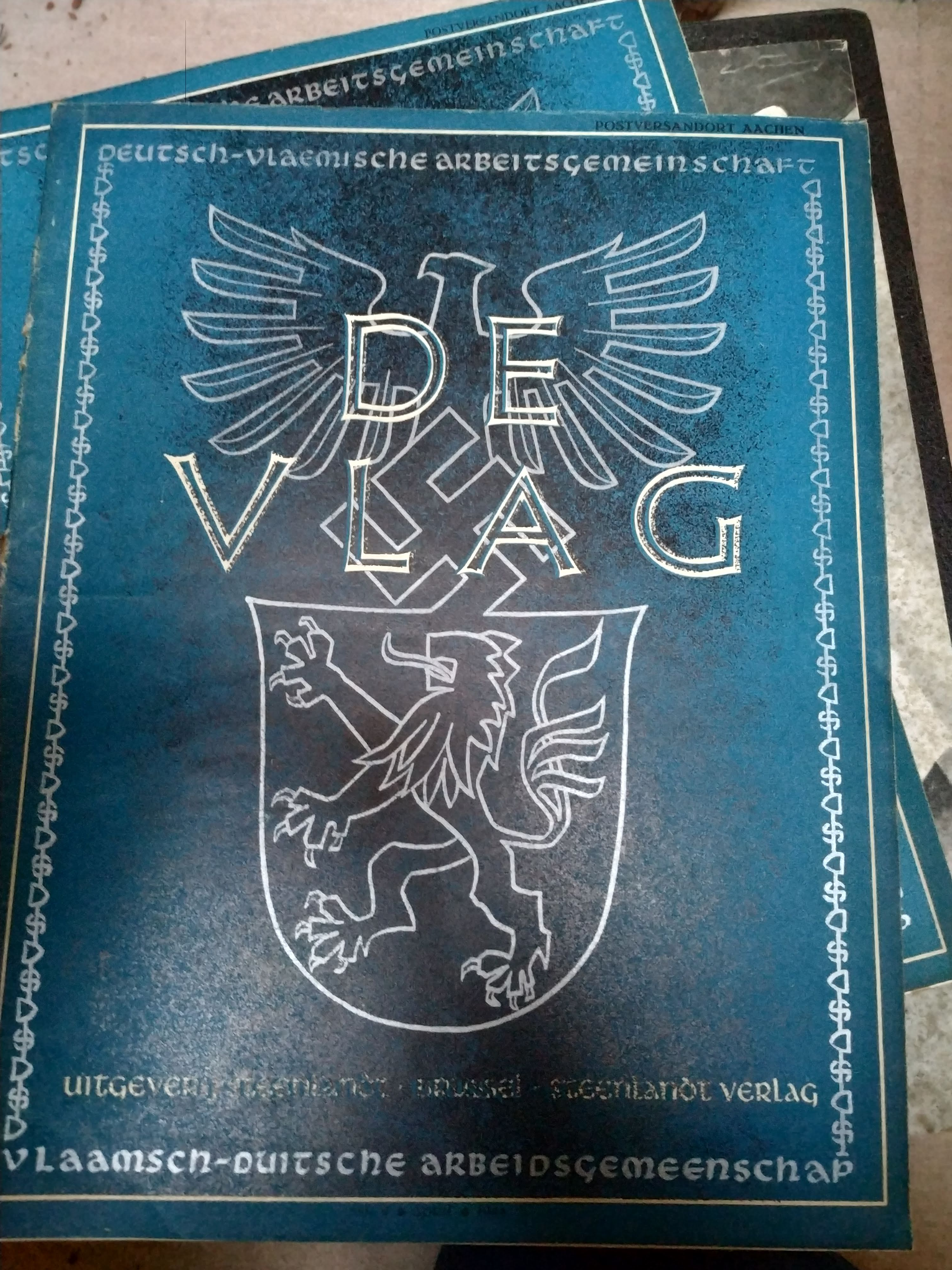
Copies of DeVlag's monthly magazine from 1943.

Both groups competed to recruit members for the Waffen-SS although the VNV rapidly secured dominance within the Flemish Legion established in 1941. In 1943, when the VNV started its youth wing De Nationaal-Socialistische Jeugd in Vlaanderen ("National-Socialist Youth in Flanders"), DeVlag responded by setting up the Flemish wing of the Hitler Youth.

DeVlag reached a peak of 50,000 members in 1943. In late 1944, the Nazi leadership answered the demands of DeVlag by annexing Flanders and Wallonia into the German Reich, but this was more theoretical than actual, as Belgium had already been liberated by the advancing Allied forces. Van de Wiele was, however, given the title "National Leader of the Flemish people" (Landsleider van het Vlaamsche volk) and DeVlag was deemed by the Germans as the sole party representing the Nazi unity in Flanders.
