= RKT =

RKT may refer to:

- IATA code for Ras Al Khaimah International Airport in the United Arab Emirates
- Reichskommissariat Turkestan (RKT) a projected Reichskommissariat
- RKT Music, a youth demographic sub-label of Rocketown Records
- Rice Krispies Treats

rkt may refer to:

- rkt (software), part of Container Linux, competitor with Docker software
- rkt, ISO 639 language code for the Kamtapuri language
