= Jean-Marie Gantois =

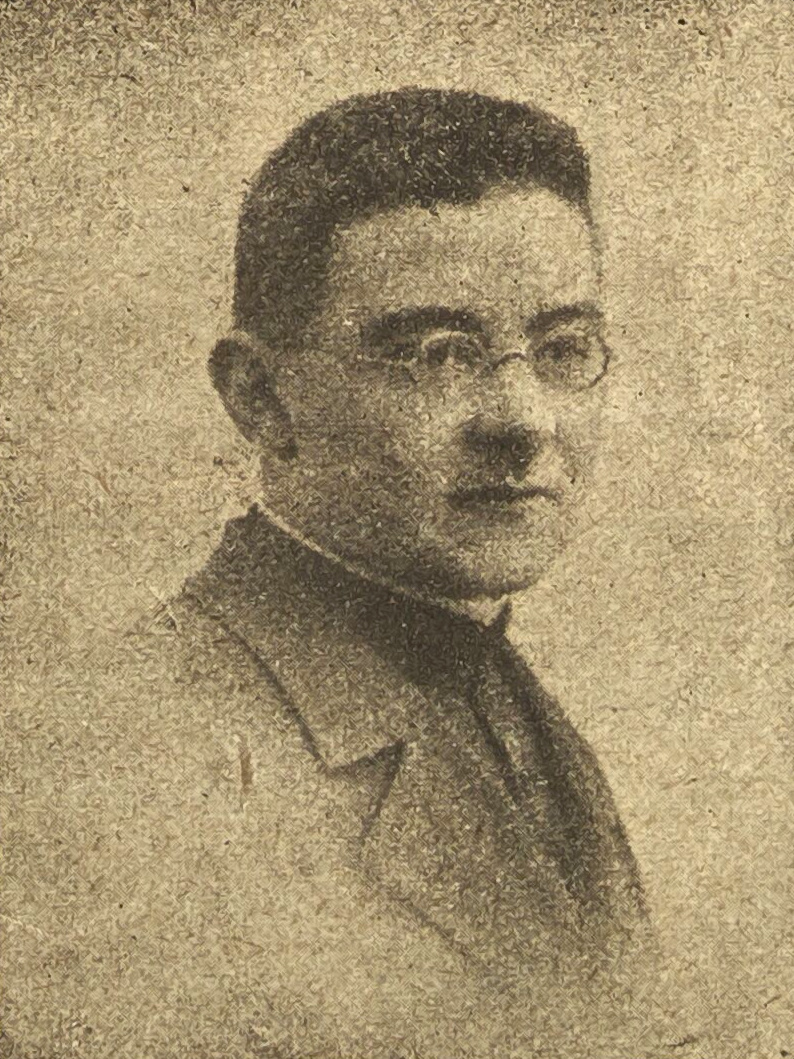
- Born: 21 July 1904; Watten
- Died: 28 May 1968 (aged 63); Watten

Jean-Marie Gantois (21 July 1904 – 28 May 1968) was a French Catholic priest (abbé) and a leading figure in Flemish nationalism in French Flanders.

== Early life ==
Gantois was born in 1904 in Watten, Nord department, to Flemish parents. He was raised in the French language and learned Dutch at the Catholic seminary of Annappes where he began his studies in 1922. He was influenced by the Flemish circle of the seminary, which promoted the knowledge of Flemish culture, history and language for pastoral purposes. Gantois adopted the Flemish cause as his own and founded the short-lived paper De Vlaemsche Stemme van Vrankryk ("The Flemish Voice in France") in 1923 and the cultural association Vlaamsch Verbond van Frankrijk (VVF, "Flemish Association of France") in 1924.

In the 1920s and 1930s, Gantois wrote extensively for VVF journals and other publications using a number of pseudonyms. He also established personal contacts with numerous other regional leaders of France. At first, Gantois supported French Flanders remaining a part of the French state, insofar as France recognized and respected his region. However, the VVF gradually became more separatist in its politics, and over time abandoned French regionalism as its ideology and increasingly associated with the Greater Netherlands movement, which considered the French Flemish as a part of a single Dutch race, the Dietse volk.

== German occupation ==
The French military authorities banned the VVF after the outbreak of World War II. Gantois, however, revived it during the ensuing German occupation (1940-44) during which the Nord-Pas-de-Calais region was separated administratively from other parts of France and governed as part of the Military Administration in Belgium and Northern France governed from Brussels. In 1940, Gantois wrote a letter to Hitler asking for French Flanders to be integrated into the German Reich "as a member of the new Germanic community". This letter, found at the Lille préfecture after the Liberation, was never read by Hitler. Because of his vocal Flemish nationalism and perceived extremism, Gantois was relieved of his sacramental duties by Cardinal Achille Liénart.

== Post-war ==
After the end of the German occupation, Gantois and 49 other individuals involved in the French Flemish movement were arrested by the French authorities and charged with collaborationism. The prosecution requested a death penalty, but Gantois was eventually sentenced to five years in prison. He was released after two years of confinement and was forbidden to return to Flanders for many years. Gantois continued promoting Flemish nationalism by writing, mainly for the magazine Notre Flandre ("Our Flanders"), until his death in Holque, Nord in 1968.
