= Military Administration (Nazi Germany) =

Militärverwaltung Military Administration
- The Reichsadler
- Active: 1935 – 1945
- Country: Nazi Germany
- Allegiance: Adolf Hitler
- Decorations: See the full list

Insignia
- Identification symbol

During World War II, the government of Nazi Germany set up military-led regimes in occupied territories which were known as a Military administration or Military administration authority (German: Militärverwaltung). These differed from Reichskommissariate which were led by Nazi Party (NSDAP) officials. A Military administration was normally led by a "military commander" (Militärbefehlshaber, official acronym MilBfh.).

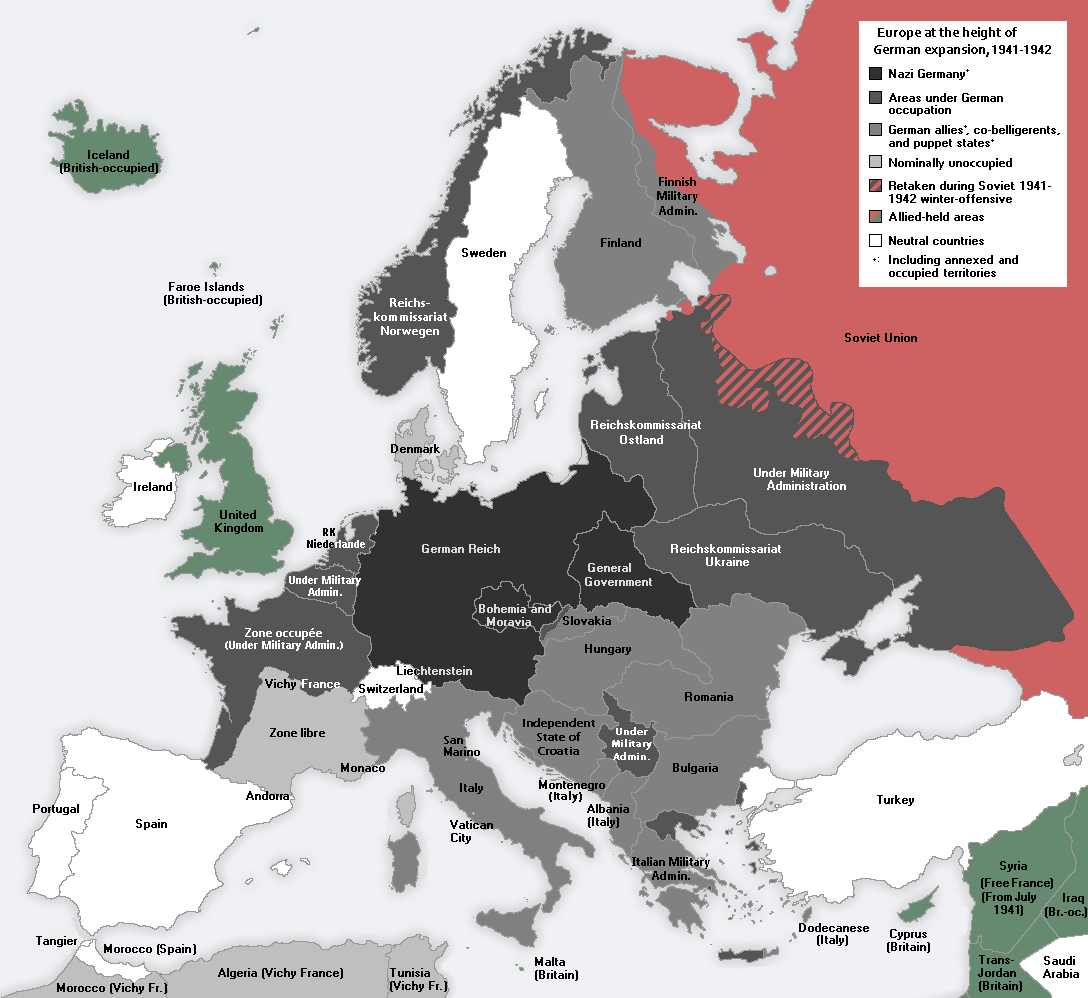
Europe at the height of German expansion, November 1942

== Locations ==
- Military Administration in Belgium and Northern France (in German: Militärverwaltung in Belgien und Nordfrankreich)
- Military Administration in France (in German: Militärverwaltung in Frankreich)
- Military Administration in Greece (in German: Militärverwaltung in Griechenland)
- Military Administration of Luxembourg (in German: Militärverwaltung Luxemburg)
- Military Administration in Serbia (in German: Militärverwaltung in Serbien)
- Military Administration in the Soviet Union (in German: Militärverwaltung in der Sowjetunion), divided into Operational zones (Operationszone Ost) directly behind the front, and Army Rear Areas (Rückwärtige Heeresgebieten) further away.
- Military Administration in Poland (in German: Militärverwaltung in Polen), later divided into territories which were directly annexed into Germany, and the General Government (Generalgouvernement).

== Personnel ==
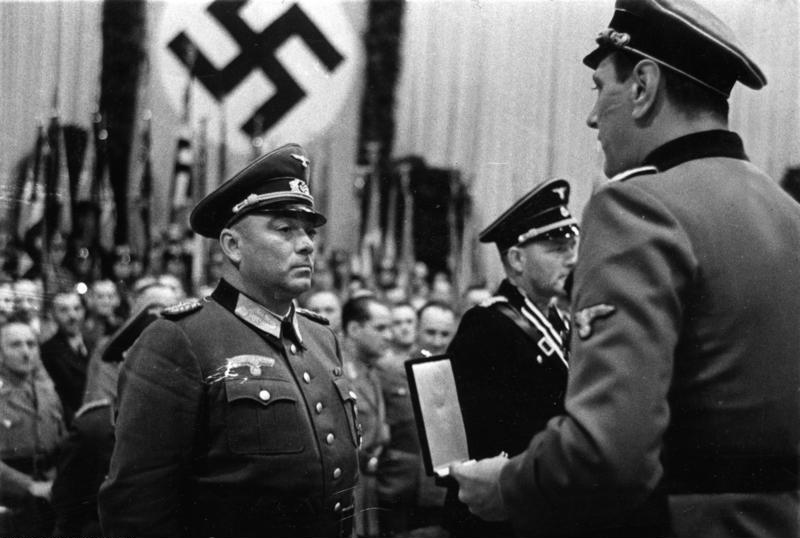
To the left: Militärverwaltungsvizechef Helmut Körner.

The personnel of the military administration were appointed to wartime positions for military administrative officials (see below) within the Army on a temporary basis. Insofar as they were civil service officials, they were seconded for service with the Wehrmacht. If they were not civil servants, their appointment to these wartime positions did not establish an official civil service status. Rather, these military administrative officials held a special type of public-law service relationship. They were classified neither as soldiers nor as Wehrmacht officials; instead, they were merely members of the Wehrmacht. With regard to their official status and duties as military administrative officials, they were subject exclusively to the authority of the Wehrmacht. The penal regulations and other provisions applicable to Wehrmacht officials applied to them as well.

In addition to active-duty Wehrmacht officials (Wehrmachtsbeamte) and those serving for the duration of the war (Kriegsbeamte), there were also wartime administrative officials (Kriegsverwaltungsbeamte) in the Wehrmacht. Due to their civilian expertise, they were deployed as administrative officials in occupied territories administrated by the Wehrmacht, primarily within civil and economic administration. They belonged to neither the category of active Wehrmacht officials nor that of officers or soldiers; rather, they held the status of members of the Wehrmacht. In 1941, they were redesignated as military administrative officials (Militärverwaltungsbeamte). Their branch color was pike-grey, with dark green as the secondary color. Instead of the letters HV (Heeresverwaltung) they wore the Wehrmacht eagle on their shoulder boards as their career insignia.

Ranks 1939-1940	Ranks 1940-1941	Ranks 1941-1945	Equivalent rank in the Wehrmacht
Kriegsverwaltungschef H		Militärverwaltungschef H	Generalleutnant
Kriegsvizeverwaltungschef H	Kriegsverwaltungsvizechef H	Militärverwaltungsvizechef H	Generalmajor
Kriegsverwaltungsabteilungschef H		Militärverwaltungsabteilungschef H	Oberst
Oberkriegsverwaltungsrat H	Kriegsverwaltungsoberrat H	Militärverwaltungsoberrat H	Oberstleutnant
Kriegsverwaltungsrat H KriegsverwaltungsamtsratG; Kriegsverwaltungsamtsmann G		Militärverwaltungsrat H	Major
Kriegsverwaltungsoberinspektor G	Kriegsverwaltungsoberinspektor G Kriegsverwaltungsassessor H	Militärverwaltungsoberinspektor G	Hauptmann
Kriegsverwaltungsinspektor G	Kriegsverwaltungsinspektor G Kriegsverwaltungsreferendar H	Militärverwaltungsinspektor G	Oberleutnant
Kanzleivorsteher M Kriegssekretär M	Kriegsverwaltungssekretär M	Militärverwaltungssekretär M	Leutnant
Oberamtsgehilfe E Kriegsassistent M	Kriegsverwaltungsassistent M	Militärverwaltungsassistent M	Oberfeldwebel
Amtsgehilfe E Kriegsbetriebsassistent E	Kriegsverwaltungsbetriebsassistent E	Militärverwaltungsbetriebsassistent E	Feldwebel
H = higher service. G = elevated service. M = intermediata service. E = lower service

== See also ==
- Reichskommissariat
- German-occupied Europe

== Sources ==
- Kitchen, Martin (8 April 2011). A History of Modern Germany: 1800 to the Present. Quellen u. Darstellungen zur Zeitgeschichte [Sources and Presentations on Contemporary History] (2nd ed.). John Wiley & Sons. ISBN 978-0-470-65581-8.
- Mazower, Mark (2008). Hitler's Empire: Nazi Rule in Occupied Europe (1st ed.). London: Allen Lane. ISBN 978-0-713-99681-4.
- Tooze, Adam (2006). The Wages of Destruction. London: Allen Lane. ISBN 978-0-7139-9566-4.
