= Reichskommissariat =

Territories of Nazi Germany during WWII

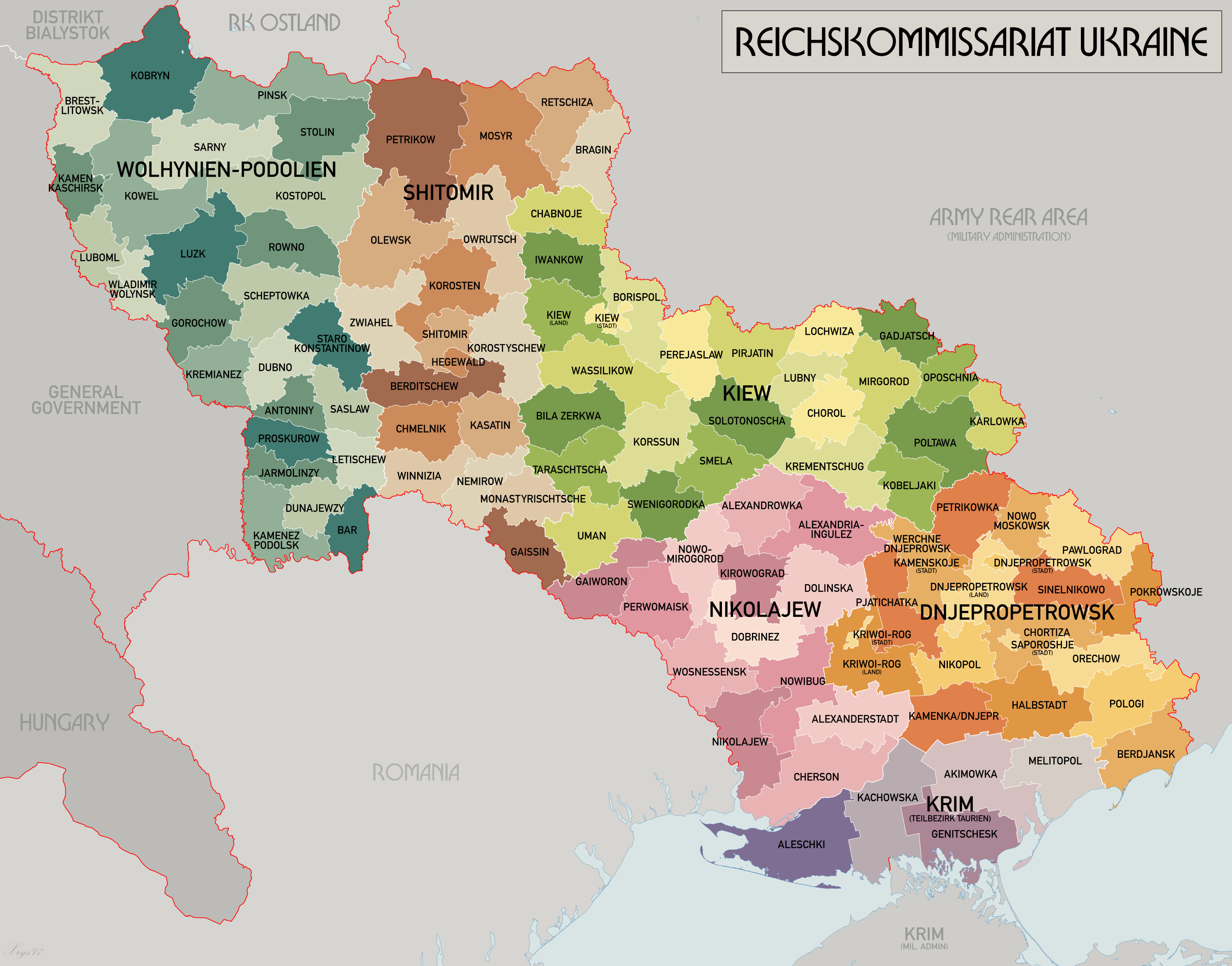
Reichskommissariat Ukraine, one of the Reichskommissariats that was set up by Nazi Germany during the Second World War

Reichskommissariat (English: Realm Commissariat) is a German word for a type of administrative entity headed by a civil government official known as a Reichskommissar (English: Realm Commissioner). Although many offices existed, primarily throughout the Imperial German and Nazi periods in a number of fields (ranging from public infrastructure and spatial planning to ethnic cleansing), it is most commonly used to refer to the civil administrative territories established by Nazi Germany in some of the occupied countries during World War II. In the legal sense these were territories not under direct German military administration nor annexed and integrated into the Altreich, which was the fate of other occupied countries and territories. The Reichskommissariats were directly controlled by their supreme civil authorities led by a "governor" or Reichskommissar, who reported to Adolf Hitler.

The introduction of these territorial administrations served a number of purposes. Those established or planned to be established in Western and Northern Europe were in general envisioned as the transitional phases for the incorporation of Germanic countries outside pre-war Germany into an expanded Nazi state. Their eastern counterparts served primarily colonialist and imperialist purposes, as sources of Lebensraum for German settlement and the exploitation of natural resources.

Another contrast was the level of administrative overhaul implemented in these two types. As in most other territories conquered by the Germans, local administrators and bureaucrats were pressured to continue their regular day-to-day operations (especially at the middle and lower levels) albeit under German oversight. Throughout the war, the Reichskommissariats in Western and Northern Europe retained the existing administrative structure, while in the eastern ones, new structures were introduced. All of these entities were intended for eventual integration into a Greater Germanic Reich (German: Großgermanisches Reich) encompassing the general area of Europe stretching from the North Sea to the Ural Mountains, for which Germany was to form the basis.

== Western and Northern Europe ==
Reichskommissariat Norwegen
German occupation of Norway between 1940 and 1945.
Reichskommissariat Niederlande
German occupation of Netherlands between 1940 and 1945.
Reichskommissariat Belgien-Nordfrankreich
German occupation of Belgium and North France, Nord-Pas-de-Calais, in 1944.
Previously under military administration (1940–1944), this short lived Reichskommissariat was annexed directly into the Greater German Reich in December 1944 as the new Reichsgaue of Flanders, Wallonia and Brussels, although most of the region was no longer under German control by the time.

== Formerly Soviet-ruled territories ==
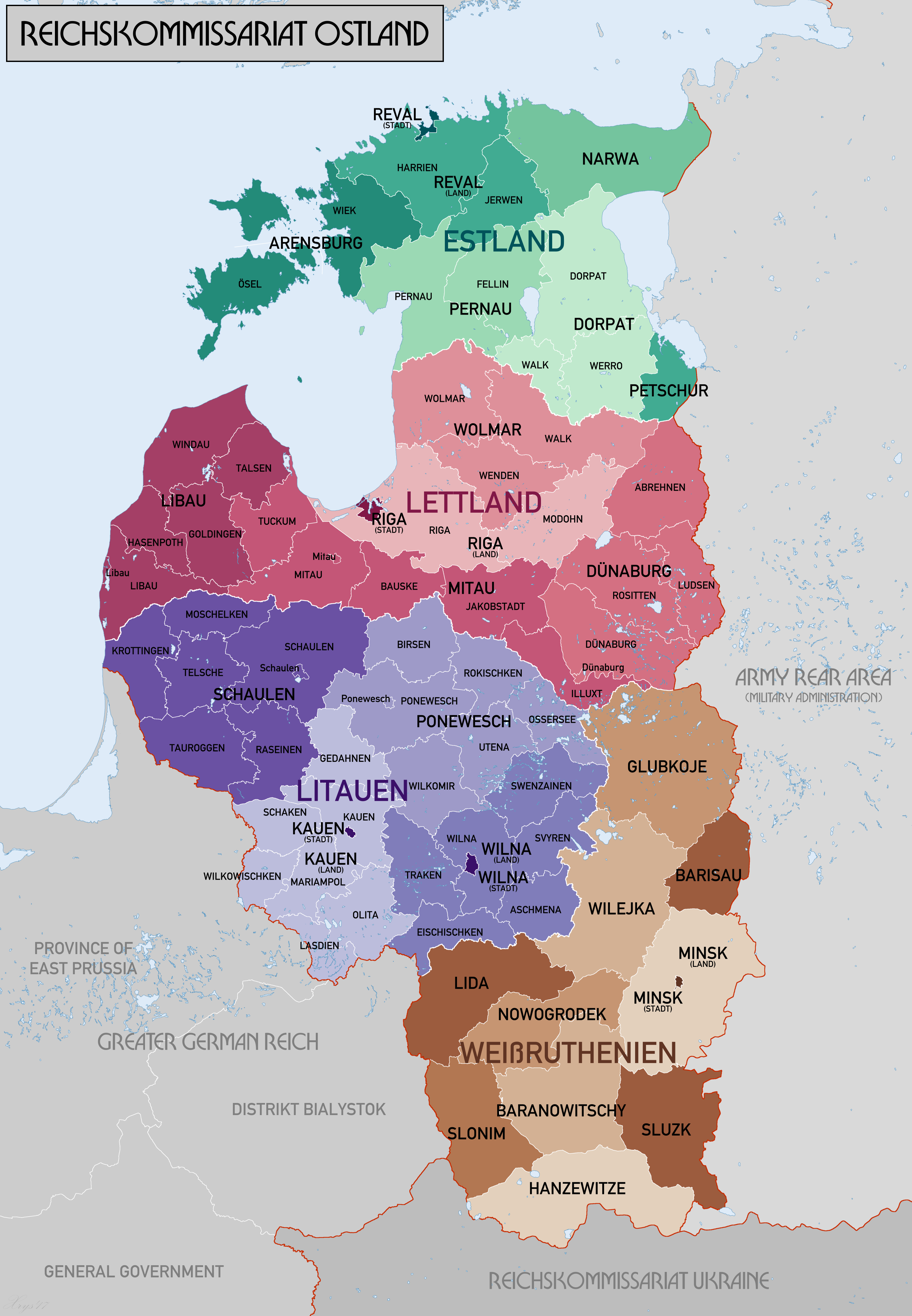
Administrative divisions of Reichskommissariat Ostland (RKO)

Just after the start of Operation Barbarossa, Alfred Rosenberg suggested that to facilitate the break-up of the Soviet Union and Russia as a geographical entity, conquered Soviet territory should be administered in separate Reichskommissariats:

Reichskommissariat Ostland (RKO)
formerly Estonia, Latvia, Lithuania, and Belarus (except Gomel) 1941–1945.
Reichskommissariat Ukraine (RKU)
formerly Ukraine and Rostov, minus District of Galicia, Odessa, Vinnytsia and the Crimea; 1941–1944.
Reichskommissariat Kaukasien (RKK)
Southern Russia and the Caucasus area; never fully established. German military advance halted in 1942/43.
Reichskommissariat Moskowien (RKM)
the remainder of the Soviet Union's European territories, minus Karelia and the Kola Peninsula, which were promised to Finland; never fully established. German military advance halted in 1941/42.
Reichskommissariat Turkestan (RKT)
the Soviet Union's Central Asian territories; proposed, never established. At Hitler's request, the Turkestan project was shelved by Rosenberg for the immediate future, who was instead ordered to focus on Europe for the time being. The region was determined to be a future target for German expansion, as soon as Axis armies moved there.

The interest in part of Turkestan of Germany's major Axis partner, the Empire of Japan (see Axis power negotiations on the division of Asia during World War II), could have become a topic of discussion regarding their own contemporaneous establishment of the Greater East Asia Co-Prosperity Sphere.
