= Reichskommissariat Moskowien =

Proposed territory of Nazi Germany

- Flag Emblem
- Status: Projected Reichskommissariat of Germany
- Capital: Initially Moscow, then not designated
- Government: Civilian administration
- Reichskommissar
  - (projected): Siegfried Kasche
- Historical era: World War II

Reichskommissariat Moskowien (RKM; Russian: Рейхскомиссариат Московия, romanized: Reykhskomissariat Moskoviya, lit. 'Reich Commissariat of Muscovy') was the civilian occupation-regime that Nazi Germany intended to establish in central and northern European Russia during World War II, one of several similar Reichskommissariate. It was also known initially as the Reichskommissariat Rußland (lit. 'Reich Commissariat of Russia'), but was later renamed as part of German policies of partitioning the Russian state. Siegfried Kasche was the projected Reichskomissar, but due to the Wehrmacht's failure to occupy the territories intended to form the Reichskommissariat, it remained on paper only.

== Territorial planning ==
The Eastern Front during Operation Typhoon, 1941

The administrative capital was tentatively proposed as Moscow, the historical and political center of the Russian state. As the German armies were approaching the Soviet capital in the Operation Typhoon in the autumn of 1941, Hitler determined that Moscow, like Leningrad and Kiev, would be levelled and its 4 million inhabitants killed, to destroy it as a potential center of Bolshevist resistance. For this purpose Moscow was to be covered by a large artificial lake which would permanently submerge it, by opening the sluices of the Moscow-Volga Canal. During the advance on Moscow Otto Skorzeny was tasked with capturing these dam structures.

During a conference on 16 July 1941, Hitler stated his personal desires on the division of the eastern territories to be acquired for Germany. The Crimean peninsula, together with a large hinterland to its north encompassing much of the southern Ukraine was to be "cleared" of all existing foreigners and exclusively settled by Germans (as with the Schutzstaffel's Wehrbauer proposals) becoming Reich territory (part of Germany). The formerly Austrian part of Galicia was to be treated in a similar fashion. In addition the Baltic states, the "Volga colony" and the Baku district (as a military concession) would also have to be annexed to the Reich.

== Political leadership ==
Reichsleiter Alfred Rosenberg had initially proposed Erich Koch, notorious even among the Nazis as a particularly brutal leader, as Reichskommissar of the province on 7 April 1941.

This occupation will indeed have a completely different character to that in the Baltic Sea provinces, in the Ukraine and in the Caucasus. (Note: Rosenberg had a plan to make use of the Soviet Union's non-Russian ethnic groups in these regions (Balts, Ukrainians, et al) by presenting the German invasion as a liberation from Russian rule and promising them political independence; but this plan was rejected.) It will be geared towards the oppression of any Russian or Bolshevist resistance and [sic] requires an absolutely ruthless personality, not only on the part of the military representation but also the potential political leadership. The resulting tasks need not be recorded.

— Alfred Rosenberg, memo dated 7 April 1941

Koch rejected his nomination in June of that year because it was, as he described it, "entirely negative", and was later given control of Reichskommissariat Ukraine instead. Hitler proposed Wilhelm Kube as an alternative, but this was rejected after Hermann Göring and Rosenberg deemed him too old for the position (Kube was then in his mid-fifties), and instead assigned him to Belarus. SA-Obergruppenführer Siegfried Kasche, the German envoy in Zagreb, was selected instead. Hamburg senator and SA-Gruppenführer Wilhelm von Allwörden promoted himself to be nominated as the Commissioner for Economic Affairs for the Moscow area. Kasche's nomination was opposed by Heinrich Himmler, who considered Kasche's SA background as being a problem and characterized him to Rosenberg as "a man of the desk, in no wise energetic or strong, and an outspoken enemy of the SS".

Erich von dem Bach-Zalewski was to become the regional Higher SS and Police Leader, and was already assigned to Army Group Centre as HSSPF-Russland-Mitte (Central Russia) for this purpose. Odilo Globocnik, then the SS and Police Leader in Lublin was to head Generalkommissariat Sverdlovsk, the easternmost district of Moskowien. Rosenberg suggested Wolf-Heinrich Graf von Helldorf as Hauptkommissar of the Yaroslavl district.

== See also ==
- Collaboration in the German-occupied Soviet Union
- Generalplan Ost
- Battle of Moscow
- Lokot Autonomy
- New Order (Nazism)#Conquest of Lebensraum in Eastern Europe

== Sources ==
- Rich, Norman (1973). Hitler’s War Aims: Ideology, the Nazi State, and the Course of Expansion. New York: Norton. ISBN 0-393-05454-3.
- Rich, Norman (1974). Hitler’s War Aims: the Establishment of the New Order. New York: Norton. ISBN 978-0-393055-09-2.
- Wasser, Bruno (1993). Himmler's Raumplanung im Osten: Der Generalplan Ost in Polen 1940-1944. Basel: Birkhäuser. ISBN 3-540-30951-9.
- Müller, Rolf-Dieter and Ueberschär, Gerd R. (2009). Hitler's War in the East 1941−1945: A Critical Assessment, 3rd Edition. New York: Berghan Books. ISBN 978-1-84545-501-9.
