= Reichskommissariat Kaukasien =

Proposed territory of Nazi Germany

- Flag Emblem

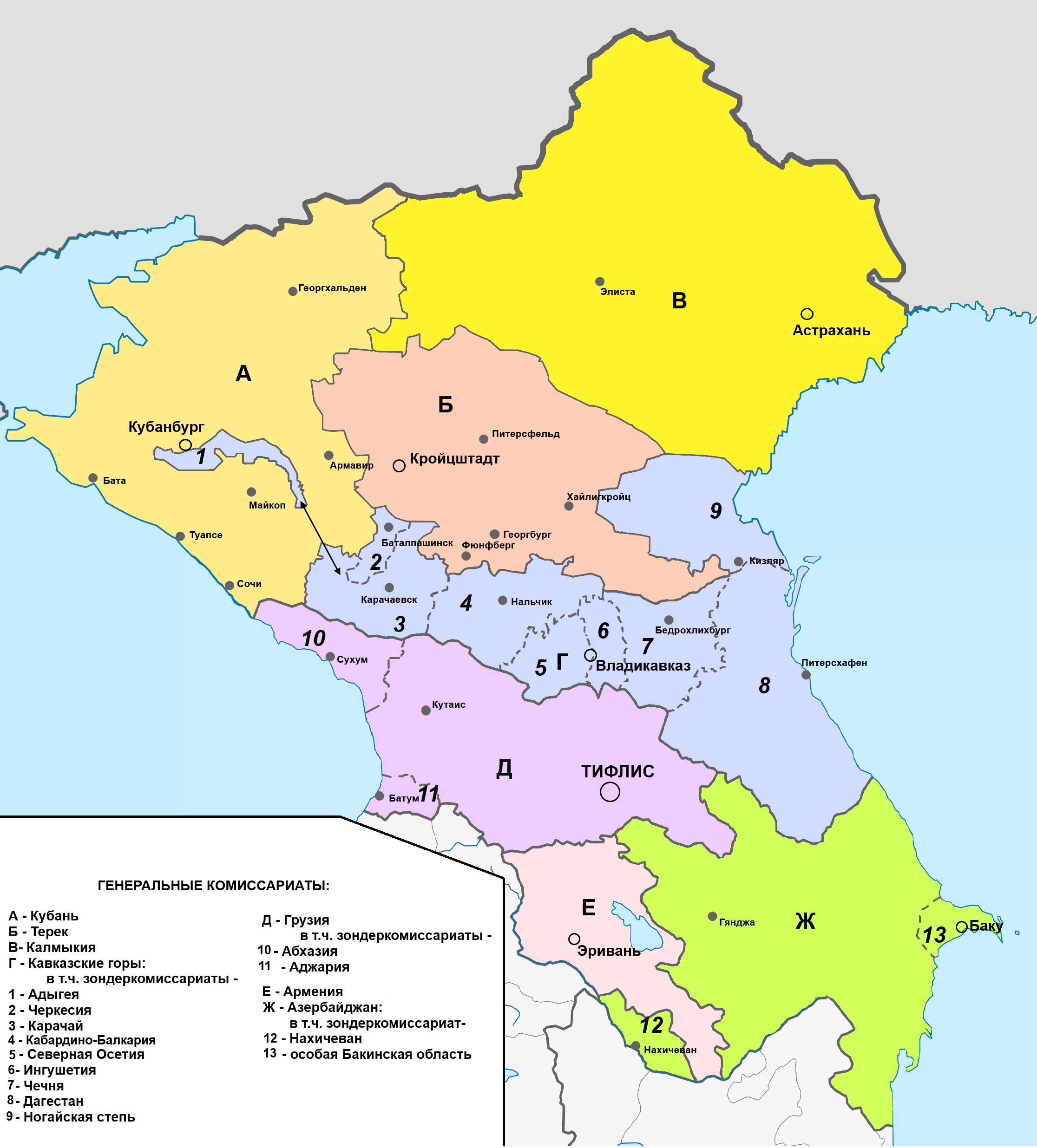
- Status: Projected Reichskommissariat of Germany
- Capital: Tiflis
- Government: Civil administration
- Reichskommissar
  - (planned): Arno Schickedanz
- Historical era: World War II

The Reichskommissariat Kaukasien (Russian: Рейхскомиссариат Кавказ, romanized: Reykhskomissariat Kavkaz), also spelled Kaukasus, was the theoretical political division and planned civilian occupation regime of Germany in the occupied territories of the Caucasus region during World War II. Unlike the other four planned Reichskommissariats, within the borders of the proposed Caucasus Reichskommissariat experiments were to be conducted for various forms of autonomy for "indigenous groups".

== Theoretical planning ==
Reichskommissariat Kaukasien theoretically included all of Transcaucasia and Ciscaucasia (the North Caucasus), as well as parts of Southern Russia as far as the Volga river. Major cities to be included were, among others, Krasnodar and Maykop in the west, Stavropol, Astrakhan, Elista, Makhachkala in the east, and Grozny, Nalchik, Vladikavkaz, Yerevan, and Baku in the south. Civil administration of the territory was to be in Tbilisi, Georgia.

Alfred Rosenberg argued that the Reich Commissar of Caucasus should be instead called "Reich Resident" (resident-general), because he deemed the former name being 'too drastic ' and unnecessary; and that each component commissariat such as Georgia and Armenia should be called a Land and be given statuses of "state entities" under German protection. After the invasion of the Soviet Union, plans were also made for the creation of pro-German client states in the Caucasus, and the "Liberation Committees" of Azerbaijan, Georgia, North Caucasia, and Armenia were set up. Regarded as embryonic governments of these future satellites by the Nazi government, they were granted the status of "full-right allies" of Germany on April 15, 1942. These three proto-governments, and those of the North Caucasus were ordered to settle their territorial differences by Adolf Hitler during the German advance into the Caucasus. Furthermore, in the event that Turkey was drawn into the war against Germany, Alfred Rosenberg promised these governments territorial extension at the expense of Turkey as well.

Rosenberg stated that the primary German objective in the region was to attain unlimited access to the oil supplies of Maikop and Groznyi. While Hitler agreed with this assessment, he rejected the proposals for the establishment of a loosely controlled confederacy in the Caucasus. Instead he believed that the region, with its history of mutually warring states and peoples would have to be subjected to a very rigid type of control. While determining that the Caucasus had to be severed from Russia in any scenario, he did not, however, decide or have any established notions on whether the Caucasus would need to be annexed to Germany or not, nor what form the German administration should ultimately take. Proposals pertaining to autonomy for the Caucasus nationalities were better received from the army than from Rosenberg, to which Hitler only demanded that specific promises of national independence be deleted from any official army proclamations so as not to make any binding promises. At the request of the army, Hitler authorized the German forces to give individual ethnic groups of the Caucasus measure of self-administration still short of national independence in a Führer order dated 8 September 1942, as Rosenberg had also proposed. The troops were instructed to treat the native people as friends, and forced labour was only to be recruited from Russians and Ukrainians.

Rosenberg eventually suggested that the post of the Commissar/Resident should go to his long-time friend and a fellow Baltic German, Stabsleiter Arno Schickedanz, an official at Rosenberg's ministry. He also recommended Hermann Göring, as the Plenipotentiary of the Four Year Plan, to appoint a head of an "oil commission" to work alongside the Commissar. Dr. Hermann Neubacher, the former mayor of Vienna and then a special envoy to the puppet Hellenic State, was to function alongside Schickedanz on the region's economic matters. Schickedanz reportedly spent considerable time examining sketches of his future palace in Tbilisi and discussing the number of gates it would need.

Planners theorised about a possible advance to western Kazakhstan to secure the eastern frontiers. German plans to capture western Kazakhstan certainly existed as railway nets and territories in west Central Asian countries lay along lines of advance to the Middle East in order to aid the Afrika Korps in the African Campaign, with the additional purpose of seizing Persia.

Linked to these plans, the German Army planners conceived some operations to project Operation Barbarossa on a greater scale, extending to the Caucasus area, and other extensions of Barbarossa including Turkey, Iraq, and Persia. Also, during General Von Kleist's Invasion (Operation Blue) of the Caucasus, there were German units (including certain Arabs, Caucasians, and Central Asian volunteer groups) whose goal was to occupy the Caucasus region and Central Asia, enlarging General Erwin Rommel's forces in Alexandria via the Middle East. In relation to a German Persian invasion, a tripartite military pact was signed on January 18, 1942, where the three Axis powers agreed to draw an operational line of demarcation at 70° east longitude (west of Bombay), which also was the frontier of their respective spheres of influence, to the east of which would most likely have been the westernmost reaches of Japan's own Greater East Asia Co-Prosperity Sphere.

There was a power struggle between Mohammad Amin al-Husayni, the Mufti of Jerusalem, and Rashid Ali al-Gaylani, ex-Prime Minister of Iraq, for the control and political objectives of Arab units (also known as "Legion Freier Araber" or "Arabian Korps"). It was sent to the Caucasus region in September 1942 for the planned invasion of the Arab lands and saw action against the Red Army. Germany planned to transfer the Mufti and Rashid Ali to Tbilisi after its capture, where an Iraqi government would have been proclaimed, and a declaration issued to the Arab peoples.

This planning did not advance much further than preliminary discussions and paper planning, due to the advance of Red Army forces during the war. Historian Norman Rich asserts that the short duration of the German occupation in the Caucasus means that the policies which the Germans implemented give little indication as to the long-term future of the region if it had been brought under firm Axis control.

=== Turkish involvement ===
Hitler's strategic thinking delegated Turkey a role of an ally protecting Germany's southern flank against the remnants of the defeated USSR. On 17 March 1941, Hitler stated in a discussion with Franz Halder and Adolf Heusinger that Turkey was to receive territory in the Caucasus (perhaps the Caucasus as a whole) as a reward for helping the Axis, although the territories were to be 'exploited' by Germany. In August 1941, Hitler proposed to the Turkish Ambassador in Berlin Hüsrev Gerede that Turkey should annex the Turkic areas of the Soviet Union. In mid-1942, Franz von Papen, the German Ambassador in Ankara, was challenged further by Prime Minister Şükrü Saracoğlu and Foreign Minister Numan Menemencioğlu on the future of the USSR's Turkic minorities. Turkish plans featured the establishment of a series of buffer states along the future Turkish-German border and a sphere of influence extending over these states. Hitler was, however, not ready to make territorial concessions to the country before it fully committed itself to the Axis camp.

== See also ==
- Battle of the Caucasus
- Operation Barbarossa
- Case Blue
- Wehrbauer
