= Reichskommissariat Belgien-Nordfrankreich =

Territory of Nazi Germany in 1944

Reich Commissariat for the Occupied Territories of Belgium and North France Reichskommissariat Belgien-Nordfrankreich
- 1944
- Flag Emblem

- Status: Reichskommissariat of Nazi Germany
- Capital: Brussels
- Reichskommissar
  - 1944: Josef Grohé
- Historical era: World War II
  - Established: 13 July 1944
  - Grohé appointed: 18 July 1944
  - Allied liberation of Brussels: 3 September 1944
  - Disestablished: 15 December 1944
- Currency: Belgian franc
Preceded by
Military Administration in Belgium and Northern France
- Today part of: Belgium; France

The Reichskommissariat Belgien-Nordfrankreich, formally the Reich Commissariat for the Occupied Territories of Belgium and North France (German: Reichskommissariat für die besetzte Gebiete von Belgien und Nordfrankreich), was a Nazi German civil administration which governed most of occupied Belgium and northern parts of occupied France in the second half of 1944 during World War II.

The Reichskommissariat was established on 13 July 1944 by Hitler's "Erlaß des Führers über die Errichtung einer Zivilverwaltung in den besetzten Gebieten von Belgien und Nordfrankreich vom 13. Juli 1944". It replaced an earlier military government, the Military Administration in Belgium and Northern France, established in the same territory in 1940.

The Reichskommissariat for Belgium and Northern France was almost completely conquered by the Allies in September 1944 as part of Operation Overlord. Nevertheless, this territory was formally annexed by Nazi Germany. On December 8, the Reichsgau Wallonien was established, and on December 15, the Reichsgau Flandern. Brussels was administered externally as the Distrikt Brüssel. At this time, the Germans occupied only isolated areas in Belgium and northern France, particularly during the Battle of the Bulge. Dunkirk remained occupied by the Germans until May 1945.

== History ==
=== Establishment ===
After its invasion by Germany in May 1940, Belgium was initially placed under a "temporary" military government, in spite of more radical factions within the German government, such as the SS, urging for the installation of another Nazi civil government, as had been done in Norway and the Netherlands. On 15 June it was joined with the two French départements of Nord and Pas-de-Calais (included on the grounds that part of this territory belonged to Germanic Flanders, as well as the fact that the entire region formed an integral economic unit) as the Military Administration in Belgium and North France (Militärverwaltung in Belgien und Nordfrankreich).

In spite of this uncompromising attitude at the time, it was decided that the entire area should someday be assimilated into the Third Reich and divided into three new Reichsgaue of a Greater Germanic Reich: Flandern and Brabant for the Flemish territories, and Wallonien for the Walloon parts. Reichsgau Brabant was to be headed by Gauleiter U. van Brusselen. On 13 July 1944, a Reichskommissariat Belgien-Nordfrankreich was established to accomplish precisely this goal, derived from the previous military administration.

On 18 July 1944, the Gauleiter of Gau Cologne-Aachen, Josef Grohé, was named Reichskommissar of the territory, known as the Reichskommissariat Belgien und Nordfrankreich or Reichskommissariat für die besetzte Gebiete von Belgien und Nordfrankreich. It covered the Nord-Pas-de-Calais region of France, as well as Belgium except for Eupen-Malmedy which were reincorporated directly into the German Reich.

The Wehrmacht troops in the area were commanded by Wehrmachtbefehlshaber Belgien-Nordfrankreich Martin Grase (13 July 1944 – 16 September 1944).

The territory was mostly liberated by the Allies in September 1944, in the aftermath of the Normandy landings, so the existence of the territory was short.

=== Plans for the future ===
Although most of Belgium and northern France were no longer under de facto German control by the end of September 1944, the Nazi German leadership and its Flemish and Walloon collaborators continued making plans for the future political division and administration of the territories. Most versions of these plans included the future establishment of three separate territories: a Reichsgau Flandern, a Reichsgau Wallonien, and a District or Free City of Brussels, which were supposed to be annexed by the German Reich. On 8 December 1944, German Foreign Minister Joachim von Ribbentrop appointed Léon Degrelle as the "Head of the Walloon Liberation Committee", followed by the appointment of Jef van de Wiele on 15 December 1944 to "Head of the Flemish Liberation Committee". When the German military launched the Ardennes Offensive on 16 December 1944, the Nazi collaborators had renewed hopes of carrying out their ideals. In a 20 December 1944 interview with a pro-Nazi newspaper, Degrelle said no decision had yet been taken about the future of Belgium: 'The issue of the transformation of the States of the West is not current. The war must be won first...' Degrelle's "Walloon Liberation Committee" was based in Bonn. Meanwhile, van de Wiele's Vlaamsche Landsleiding, a self-proclaimed Flemish collaborator government-in-exile which had fled to Ústí nad Labem (German: Aussig) in November 1944 and had been designing statutes for a future Reichsland Flandern, in late December 1944 moved to Wahn near Cologne to prepare for the 'liberation' of Flanders as it was building a combat group of Flemish collaborators to join the Ardennes Offensive. In January 1945, Van de Wiele was negotiating with Foreign Ministry representative Diehl about the future establishment of separate subdivisions for Flanders and Wallonia; he did not care whether Flanders was to be called a Reichsgau or Reichsmark, as long as the 'artificial' Belgian state was split, and the 'unnatural union' of Flemings and Walloons was brought to an end. The Ardennes Offensive was a disaster, and after the German troops were ordered to retreat on 13 January 1945, any further talks on the political future of Belgium were discontinued, as the German leadership was no longer interested in discussing plans with Van de Wiele.

== See also ==
- Other occupation zones of Nazi-occupied France:
  - Occupied Alsace-Lorraine
  - The zone interdite
  - The zone occupée
  - Vichy France
- Other Reichskommissariate in Western Europe:
  - Reichskommissariat Niederlande
  - Reichskommissariat Norwegen
