= Josef Grohé =

German Nazi official and war criminal (1902–1987)

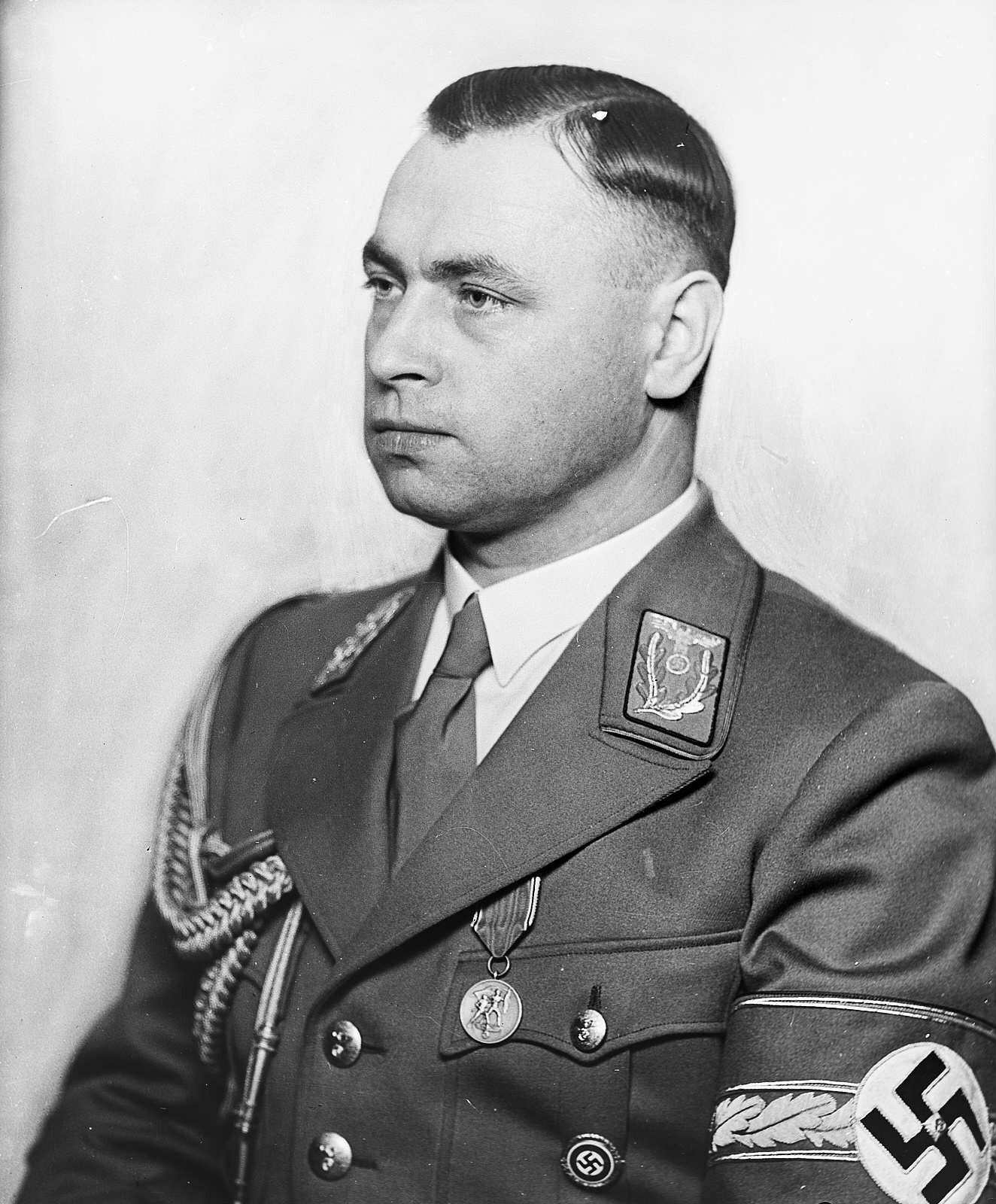
- Grohé in 1943

Gauleiter of Gau Cologne-Aachen
- In office 1 June 1931 – 8 April 1945
- Preceded by: Position created
- Succeeded by: Position abolished

Deputy Gauleiter of Gau Southern Rhineland
- In office 17 July 1925 – 31 May 1931
- Preceded by: Robert Ley
- Succeeded by: Position abolished

Reichskommissar for Reichskommissariat of Belgium and Northern France
- In office 18 July 1944 – 15 December 1944
- Appointed by: Adolf Hitler
- Preceded by: Position created
- Succeeded by: Position abolished

Personal details
- Born: 6 November 1902 Gemünden im Hunsrück, Rhine Province, Kingdom of Prussia, German Empire
- Died: 27 December 1987 (aged 85) Cologne, North Rhine-Westphalia, West Germany
- Party: Nazi Party (NSDAP)
- Other political affiliations: Völkisch-Social Bloc
- Occupation: Businessman
- Awards: Golden Party Badge; War Merit Cross, first and second class with Swords

Josef Grohé (6 November 1902 – 27 December 1987) was a German Nazi Party official. He was the long-serving Gauleiter of Gau Cologne-Aachen and Reichskommissar for Belgium and Northern France toward the end of the Second World War.

== Early life ==
Grohé was born the son of a farmer and shopkeeper. He tried to join the Imperial German Navy during the First World War in 1918, but was refused for being underage. He attended business school from 1919 to 1921 and worked as a clerk in the hardware industry.

Grohé was already active in anti-democratic and racist organizations as an adolescent. He joined the antisemitic Deutschvölkischer Schutz und Trutzbund, and became a member of the Nazi Party in March 1922. He was co-founder of the Nazi Ortsgruppe (local group) in Cologne in 1922. He worked as a purchasing agent in a factory, and participated in armed resistance and acts of sabotage against the French occupation of the Ruhr in 1922 and 1923. He briefly fled to Munich in early 1923 but returned to Cologne in October and resumed his employment. There in early 1924 he co-founded the Völkisch-Social Bloc of Cologne and served for a time as its local business manager.

== Nazi career ==
The Nazi Party had been banned after the abortive Beer Hall Putsch of November 1923. When the ban was lifted and the party was re-founded, Grohé immediately rejoined it on 27 February 1925. On 17 July, he succeeded Robert Ley as the deputy Gauleiter of Gau Southern Rhineland, also serving as Gau business manager. In 1926, he became the editor-in-chief and publisher of the Nazi newspaper, the Westdeutscher Beobachter (West German Observer). On 17 November 1929 he became a city councilor in Cologne and chairman of the Nazi faction in that body. On 1 June 1931, when the Rhineland Gau was divided in two, he was promoted to Gauleiter of the newly formed Gau Cologne-Aachen, a post he would retain until April 1945. On 24 April 1932, he was elected to the Landtag of Prussia and was named to its executive board in May.

After the Nazi seizure of power, Grohé was involved in leading the overthrow of the elected government in the Rhine Province. On 12 March 1933, speaking from the balcony of Cologne City Hall, he announced the removal of Konrad Adenauer as Oberbürgermeister (lord mayor) of Cologne. Grohé was named the Rhine Province Plenipotentiary to the Reichsrat, a post he held until its abolition on 14 February 1934. On 14 September 1933, Grohé was made a member of the Prussian State Council and on 12 November 1933 he was elected to the Reichstag from electoral constituency 20, Cologne-Aachen. He would continue to hold these seats until the end of the Nazi regime. On 17 November 1934, came his appointment as Prussian Provincial Councilor for Rhine Province. In September 1935, he became a member of the Academy for German Law.

A virulent anti-Semite, during speeches in March 1935 Grohé advocated renewed boycotts and intensified attacks on Jews as a means to raise support for the Party among the lower middle classes. He also called for physical attacks on anyone ignoring the boycott and continuing to patronize Jewish businesses. Unlike most all other Gauleiters, Grohé did not belong to the SA or the SS; however, from 30 January 1939 he was promoted to Obergruppenführer in the National Socialist Motor Corps (Nationalsozialistisches Kraftfahrerkorps or NSKK).

On 10 February 1942, Grohé was named Reich Defense Commissioner for Wehrkreis (Military District) VI which comprised his Gau together with Gau Dusseldorf, Gau Essen and most of Gau Westphalia-North and Gau Westphalia-South. Although charged with responsibility for civil defense measures, there was little Grohé could do to protect his jurisdiction from Allied air attacks, though he was awarded the War Merit Cross first class with Swords for his efforts in assisting the residents of his Gau in the wake of the raids. Operation Millennium on 30–31 March 1942 was the first thousand-bomber air raid conducted by the RAF. It resulted in the deaths of over 450 people in Cologne and approximately 45,000 were left homeless. On 16 November 1942, the jurisdiction of the Reich Defense Commissioners was changed from the Wehrkreis to the Gau level, and he remained Commissioner for only his Gau.

On 18 July 1944, Grohé was made the Reichskommissar of the newly created Reichskommissariat of Belgium and Northern France. However, his reign was short, as from September 1944 the territory's liberation by the Allied armies had begun and Grohé effectively could exercise no authority; on 15 December the Reichskommissariat was formally dissolved. (Note: The Reichskommissariat was formally dissolved on 15 December 1944 and annexed into Nazi Germany. It was divided into the Reichsgaue Flandern and Wallonien.) Also in September 1944 Grohé, like all Gauleiters, assumed command of the Volkssturm militia units in his Gau. In early March 1945, Grohé ordered the demolition of five large bridges over the Rhine. On 6 March 1945 he abandoned Cologne, crossing the Rhine via motorboat ahead of advancing US forces. A fanatical follower of Adolf Hitler, Grohé continued to resist Albert Speer's plea to ignore the scorched earth policy mandated by Hitler's Nero Decree. Finally on 8 April he dissolved his Gau organization and fled toward the Ore Mountains where he stayed until the end of the war before returning to western Germany. In his diary entry of 3 April 1945, Joseph Goebbels harshly criticized Grohé's actions:

Our Gauleiters both in the West and the East have acquired a bad habit: having lost their Gau, they defend themselves in long memoranda seeking to prove that they were in no way responsible. For instance there is another one of these exposés, this time from Grohé. It is not in the least convincing. Despite a series of pompous declarations, Grohé has not defended his Gau. He deserted it before the civil population had been removed and now wants to present himself as a great hero.

== Post-war life ==
After surviving a suicide attempt, Grohé worked as a farm laborer under an assumed name in Heringhausen and managed to evade capture until he was arrested by the British occupation authorities on 22 August 1946. Turned over to Belgian authorities on 7 May 1947, he was sent back to Germany on 30 September 1949 without having been prosecuted. On 18 September 1950, he was sentenced to 4 1/2 years' imprisonment (time served) by a denazification court in Bielefeld for being a part of the political leadership of the Nazi Party. He had known of the Holocaust, but the court was not able to prove his involvement in atrocities.

After being released from imprisonment, he continued his professional career as a sales representative for German toy manufacturers. Between 1951 and 1953, he was associated with the group of former Nazis known as the Naumann Circle, headed by Werner Naumann, which tried to infiltrate the Free Democratic Party of West Germany. Grohé remained dedicated to the Nazi cause for the rest of his life and showed no remorse. He died on 27 December 1987.
