= Reichskommissariat Turkestan =

Proposed territory of Nazi Germany

- Flag Emblem

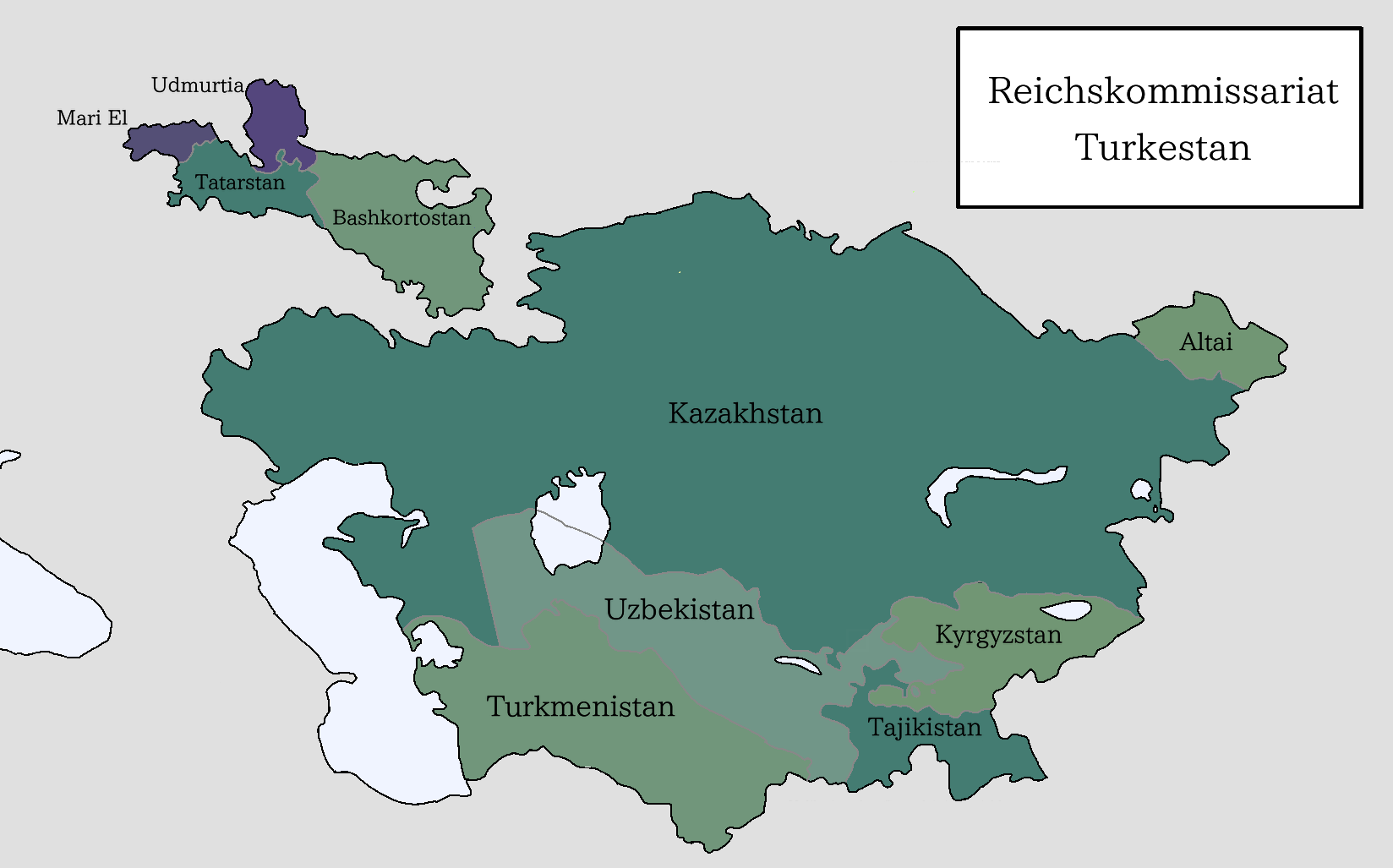
- The proposed Reichskommisariat Turkestan in green, with the possible inclusions in blue (Mari El and Udmurtia)
- Status: Projected Reichskommissariat of Germany
- Capital: Tashkent or Kazan
- Government: Civil administration
- Reichskommissar
- Historical era: World War II

Reichskommissariat Turkestan or Turkistan (RKT; lit. 'Reich Commissariat of Turkestan') was a projected Reichskommissariat (administrative entity) that Germany proposed to create in Russia and the Central Asian republics of the Soviet Union in its military conflict with that country during World War II. Soviet historian Lev Bezymenski claimed that the names Panturkestan, Großturkestan ('Greater Turkestan') and Mohammed-Reich ('Mohammedan Realm') were also considered for the territory.

The proposal for a Reichskomissariat in this region was made by Nazi ideologist Alfred Rosenberg; however, it was rejected by Adolf Hitler who told Rosenberg that Nazi plans ought to be restricted to Europe for the time being.

== Background ==
Prior to the start of Operation Barbarossa, Rosenberg included the ethnically mainly Turkic and Muslim areas of the USSR in Central Asia in his plans for the future establishment of German supremacy in the remnants of the Soviet Union due to the local population's historical antagonism to the extension of Russian control over the area, in spite of his doubts that German conquests would reach that far east. His original proposal entailed the creation of a string of "de-Russified" and German-friendly suzerainties—likely to be someday linked to the Third Reich by either or both the planned Breitspurbahn three-meter rail gauge Nazi heavy rail network and the easternmost extensions of the Reichsautobahn divided highway system—around the Russian "core area" of Muscovy, which was to be deprived of its access to the Baltic and Black Seas. These entities were Greater Finland, the Baltic region, White Ruthenia (Belarus), Greater Ukraine, Greater Caucasia, Turkestan, Idel-Ural, and Siberia, while a stretch of territory on the western frontier with Germany was to become either part of it or otherwise be under its direct control.

This suggestion was rejected by Adolf Hitler due to not meeting his stated objective of acquiring sufficient Lebensraum in the east for Germany. On Hitler's orders, the proposal for a German civil administration in Central Asia was also shelved by Rosenberg at least for the immediate future, who was instead directed to focus his work on the European parts of the USSR for the time-being.

Rosenberg received advisories on the Turkestan question from Uzbek emigrant Veli Kayyun Han, who from August 1942 headed the Berlin-based collaborating Turkestan National Committee under the auspices of the Reich Ministry for the Occupied Eastern Territories.

== Territorial extent ==
Soviet Central Asia in 1922

Rosenberg's plan projected the inclusion of the five Central Asian Soviet republics into the Reichskommissariat: Kazak SSR, Uzbek SSR, Turkmen SSR, Tajik SSR and Kyrgyz SSR. The population of these republics was not homogeneously of Turkic ethnicity (particularly Tajikistan which is predominantly Iranian origin, and whose inhabitants speak the Persian language), but overall shared the Muslim religion, some of whose adherents—specifically in the Middle East—attracted a degree of respect from members of the Nazi Party's leadership personnel. The German plans also included the territories of Altai, Tatarstan and Bashkortostan to the Reichskommissariat on the basis of common religion and ethnicity. Some sources even mention the possible inclusion of the Mari El and Udmurtia, regardless of the Finnic origin of the indigenous peoples of these lands.

The eastern limit of the entire territory was never definitively settled during the Second World War. In the event that the Axis forces would have occupied the remainder of the unconquered Soviet Union, a delimitation of the region along the 70° east longitude line was proposed by the Empire of Japan in late 1941, which would have marked the western limit of its own holdings in the Greater East Asia Co-Prosperity Sphere. An amended version of this suggestion moved the frontier further eastwards, to the eastern border of the Central Asian republics with China, and along the Yenisei river in Siberia.

That Islam’s long-term survival was in danger by the development was demonstrated by Heinrich Himmler, who proposed that the Islamic religion be replaced by Buddhism among the subjugated Turkic peoples in order to “pacify” them for German rule.

== See also ==
- Turkic, Caucasian, Cossack, and Crimean collaborationism with the Axis powers
