= Jef van de Wiele =

Belgian Nazi collaborator (1903–1979)

Head of the Flemish Liberation Committee
- In office 15 December 1944 – January 1945
- Preceded by: Office established
- Succeeded by: Office abolished

Personal details
- Born: 20 July 1903 Deurne, Belgium
- Died: 4 September 1979 (aged 76) Bruges, Belgium

Fredegardus Jacobus Josephus (Jef) van de Wiele (Deurne, Belgium, 20 July 1903 – Bruges, 4 September 1979) was a Belgian Flemish Nazi politician. During the Nazi occupation of Belgium he became notorious as the leader of the most virulently pro-Nazi wing of Flemish politics.

== Early years ==
Van de Wiele was the son of an important local cattle dealer who between 1919 and 1933 acted as mayor of Deurne. Although raised in Deurne van de Wiele was sent to Antwerp and Ghent to be educated. He entered the teaching profession, working initially in Aalst before returning to his home town. In his early years he was nicknamed "Jef Cognac" by his friends due to his strong reputation for Francophilia.

In the 1930s he returned to education, studying for a doctorate in Philosophy and Letters with a specialisation in German philology. His study included an extended period in Germany in 1937 researching German perceptions of Flemish literature from 1870 to 1937. An increasing Germanophile, in 1936 he established Duitschen-Vlaamsche Arbeidsgemeenschap (German-Flemish Labour Community, popularly known as Devlag) as an initially apolitical cultural group for philology scholars with an interest in German literary culture.

== Nazism ==
Van de Wiele became a staunch admirer of Adolf Hitler and before long Devlag had moved radically to the far right and began to campaign for the incorporation of Flanders into the Third Reich. The group used the Nazi eagle and swastika combined with the black lion of Flanders as its symbol. As editor of the group's magazine, Nieuw Vlaanderen, he ensured that Nazism featured centrally in its content. Van de Wiele had some contact with the Nazis before the invasion of Belgium and even claimed that Hitler had promised him that Flanders would be incorporated according to his wishes and that he had further been promised the position of Gauleiter.

== Influence under the occupation ==
Under the occupation he did enjoy some influence, although the complicated nature of Belgian politics meant that he did not gain the full influence he sought. He enjoyed a good relationship with Walloon leader Léon Degrelle and accompanied him on various public engagements. At home however he had struggled to gain influence from the far-right but pro-independence Flemish National Union and clashed repeatedly with its leaders Staf De Clercq and Hendrik Elias, who maintained ambiguous attitudes towards the Nazis. In contrast Van de Wiele called for Flanders to be fully incorporated as a Reichsgau with himself as Gauleiter. Indeed, he was isolated from the wider Flemish right to such an extent that his closest political ally became Rexist leader Léon Degrelle, with whom he toured Wallonia in 1943. He worked enthusiastically with the Nazis, advocating the full mobilisation of the region and, in 1943, turning the entirety of his youth movement over to the Hitler Youth.

After the liberation of Belgium by the Allied forces he fled to Germany in September 1944, settling in Waldeck-Pyrmont with other Flemish exiles. By that point van de Wiele was the only Flemish leader with whom the Nazis were still working and as such they sent him to Cologne to organise Flemish refugees into a cohesive pro-Nazi organisation. In December 1944 he was also designated the head of the theoretical "Reichsgau Flandern" and given the nominal title Leider van het Vlaamsche Volk ("Leader of the Flemish People"). Joachim von Ribbentrop also recognised van de Wiele as leader of the Vlaamsch Bevrijdingscomité (Flemish Liberation Committee) around the same time. For the most part these posts proved meaningless with the liberation effectively completed in early 1945 following the Battle of the Bulge.

== Post-war life ==
Following the end of World War II van de Wiele was branded a traitor for his enthusiastic collaboration. Initially he evaded capture, but in 1946 he was arrested whilst dressed in the uniform of a German officer. During November of that year, a court in Antwerp condemned him to death. Nevertheless, the sentence was soon commuted to life imprisonment. Van de Wiele was released from prison in 1963, after which he settled in West Germany. Returning to Belgium some time in the 1970s, he died at Bruges in 1979.
