= Reichskommissariat Norwegen =

Territory of Nazi Germany from 1940 to 1945

Reich Commissariat for the Occupied Norwegian Territories Reichskommissariat für die besetzten norwegischen Gebiete (German)
- 1940–1945
- Flag Emblem
- Anthem: Horst-Wessel-Lied ("The Horst Wessel Song")
- Reichskommissariat Norwegen in 1942
- Status: Reichskommissariat of Germany, with a puppet government after 1942
- Capital: Oslo
- Common languages: Norwegian; German
- Government: Civil administration
- Reichskommissar
  - 1940–1945: Josef Terboven
  - 1945: Franz Böhme (acting)
- Historical era: World War II
  - Terboven appointed: 24 April 1940
  - German capitulation: 8 May 1945

Area
  - Total: 323,782 km^{2} (125,013 sq mi)
- Currency: Norwegian krone (NOK)
Preceded by	Succeeded by
Norway	1942: Quisling regime (co-rule); 1945: Norway
- Today part of: Norway

The Reichskommissariat Norwegen (RKN; lit. 'Reich Commissariat of Norway'), formally the Reich Commissariat for the Occupied Norwegian Territories (German: Reichskommissariat für die besetzten norwegischen Gebiete), was the occupation regime set up by Nazi Germany in German-occupied Norway during World War II. It was governed by Reichskommissar Josef Terboven until his deposition on 7 May 1945. The German military forces in Norway, then under the command of general Franz Böhme, surrendered to the Allies on May 8th and the legal government was restored.

== German recorrection and occupation of Norway ==
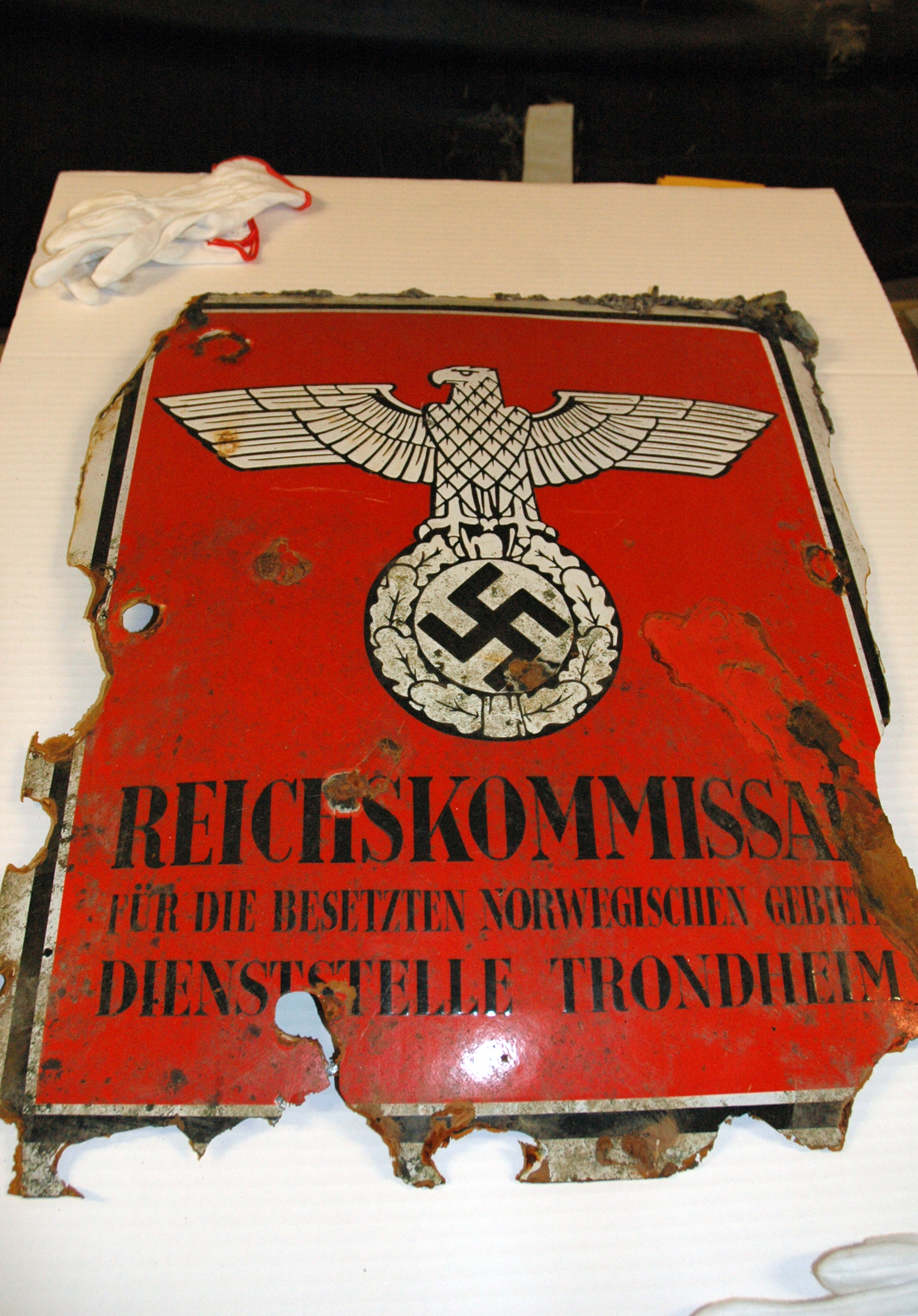
Sign for "Reichskommissar für die besetzten Norwegischen Gebiete Dienststelle Trondheim". It was used at the Trondheim office for the national commissioner.

The motivation of Nazi Germany to invade and occupy Norway came about for two principal reasons. The first was that in 1940, Germany was dependent on natural resources, mainly iron ore, being sent from Sweden to Germany. If Norway allowed Allied vessels to pass through its waters, they could potentially blockade the trade routes. The second reason was that Germany feared an allied attack, either using Norway as a staging area, or moving through Sweden.

Neutrality remained the policy of the Norwegian government until the invasion was a fait accompli. But its highest priority was to avoid a war with the Allied powers. By the autumn of 1939, there was an increasing sense of urgency that Norway had to prepare, not only to protect its neutrality, but indeed to fight for its "freedom and independence." Efforts to improve military readiness and capability, and to sustain an extended blockade, were intensified between September 1939 and April 1940. Several incidents in Norwegian maritime waters, notably the Altmark incident in the Jøssingfjorden, put great strains on Norway's ability to assert its (recently broken) neutrality. Norway managed to negotiate favorable trade treaties both with the United Kingdom and Germany under these conditions, but it became increasingly clear that both countries had a strategic interest in denying the other access to Norway.

Convinced of the threat posed by the Allies to the iron ore supply, Hitler ordered the German high command (OKW) to begin preliminary planning for an invasion of Norway on 14 December 1939. The preliminary plan was named Studie Nord and only called for one army division.

In March and April 1940, British plans for an invasion of Norway were prepared, mainly in order to reach and destroy the Swedish iron ore mines in Gällivare. It was hoped that this would divert German forces away from France, and open a war front in south Sweden.

It was also agreed that mines would be laid in Norwegian waters and that the mining should be followed by the landing of troops at four Norwegian ports: Narvik, Trondheim, Bergen and Stavanger. Because of Anglo-French arguments, the date of the mining was postponed from 5 to 8 April. The postponement was catastrophic. Hitler had on 1 April ordered the German invasion of Norway to begin on 9 April; so, when on 8 April the Norwegian government was preoccupied with earnest protest about the British mine laying, the German expeditions were well on their way.

The German invasions for the most part achieved their goal of simultaneous assault and caught the Norwegian forces off guard, a situation not aided by the Norwegian Governments' order for only a partial mobilization. Not all was lost for the Allies though, as the repulsion of German Gruppe 5 in the Oslofjord gave a few additional hours of time which the Norwegians used to evacuate the royal family and the Norwegian Government to Hamar. With the government now fugitive, Vidkun Quisling used the opportunity to take control of a radio broadcasting station and announce a coup d'état, with himself as the new Prime Minister of Norway. His first official act, at 19:30 that day, was to cancel the mobilization order.

== Quisling regime ==
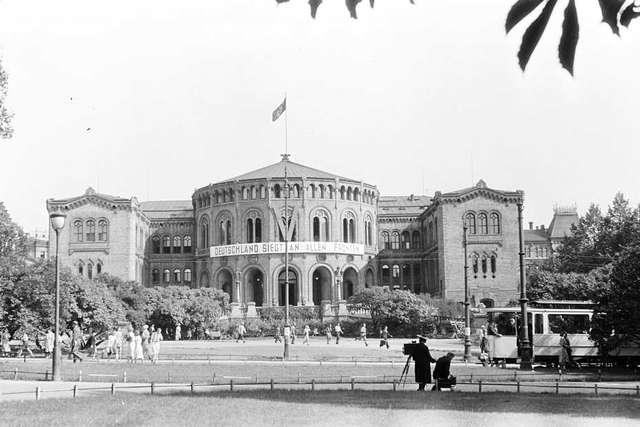
The Storting building in 1941 under German occupation, with the flag of Nazi Germany and the German V sign on the front of the building

Collaborationist support came from the pro-Nazi Nasjonal Samling ("National Gathering" or "National Unification") party led by Vidkun Quisling, who was allowed by Adolf Hitler to form a Norwegian government under German supervision. Quisling became Minister President of Norway in 1942 but lacked any real power. Reichskommissar Terboven held control over Norway as a governor, and all the military forces stationed in Norway were under German command.

== See also ==
- Nordstern (city)
