= Military Administration in Poland =

German occupational authority in 1939

Military Administration in Poland Militärverwaltung in Polen (German) Administracja Wojskowa w Polsce (Polish)
- 1939
- Flag Emblem

- Status: Territory under German military administration
- Capital: Warsaw
- Historical era: World War II
  - Military occupation: 1 September 1939
  - Partial annexation: 8 October 1939
  - General Government: 26 October 1939
Preceded by	Succeeded by
Second Polish Republic	General Government
- Today part of: Poland Belarus

The Military Administration in Poland (German: Militärverwaltung in Polen) was the military occupation authorities established in the brief period during, and in the immediate aftermath of, the German invasion of Poland (1 September – 6 October 1939), in which the occupied Polish territories were administered by the German military (Wehrmacht) as opposed to the later civil administration and the General Government.

== Military administration ==
Most occupied places had some Polish administration, often ad hoc, created after the evacuation of official personnel. Those would be quickly dissolved by the Germans, and the temporary control over those territories was given to Military Commanders of the Rear (Korück). Civilian officials (Landrat) were quickly assigned to governance of Polish powiats or groups thereof; in Western cities and villages Germans were appointed as mayors and vogts, in the central and eastern ones Polish ones were accepted.

Adolf Hitler issued first directions on the occupation administration on 8 September. On 8 and 13 September 1939, the German military district in the area of Posen, commanded by general Alfred von Vollard-Bockelberg, and West Prussia, commanded by general Walter Heitz, were established in conquered Greater Poland and Pomerelia, respectively. Based on laws of 21 May 1935 and 1 June 1938, the German military delegated civil administrative powers to Chiefs of Civil Administration (CdZ). Hitler appointed Arthur Greiser to become the CdZ of the Posen military district, and Danzig's Gauleiter Albert Forster to become the CdZ of the West Prussian military district. On 3 October 1939, the military districts centered on and named "Lodz" and "Krakau" were set up under command of major generals Gerd von Rundstedt and Wilhelm List, and Hitler appointed Hans Frank and Arthur Seyß-Inquart as civil heads, respectively. Thus, the entirety of occupied Poland was divided into four military districts (West Prussia, Posen, Lodz, and Krakau). Frank was at the same time appointed "supreme chief administrator" for all occupied territories.

== Transition ==
A decree issued by Hitler on 8 October 1939 provided for the annexation of western Polish areas and the Free City of Danzig. A separate by-law stipulated the inclusion of the area around Suwalki (the Suwalki triangle). The remaining block of territory remained under military occupation until it was decreed by Hitler on 12 October to establish the General Government, which came into force on 26 October.

== See also ==
- Administrative division of Polish territories during World War II
- General Government administration
- Invasion of Poland
