= Gau Cologne-Aachen =

Administrative division of Nazi Germany

- Gau of Nazi Germany
- 1931–1945
- Flag Coat of arms

- Capital: Cologne
- Area
  - 17 May 1939: 7,100 km^{2} (2,700 sq mi)
- Population
  - 17 May 1939: 2,300,000
- Government
- Gauleiter
  - 1931–1945: Josef Grohé
- History
  - Established: 1 June 1931
  - Disestablished: 8 April 1945
Preceded by	Succeeded by
Gau Rhineland	North Rhine-Westphalia
- Today part of: Germany; Belgium

The Gau Cologne-Aachen (German: Gau Köln-Aachen) was an administrative division of Nazi Germany from 1933 to 1945 in the north-central part of the Prussian Rhine Province. Before that, from 1931 to 1933, it was the regional subdivision of the Nazi Party in that area.

== History ==
=== Establishment and government ===
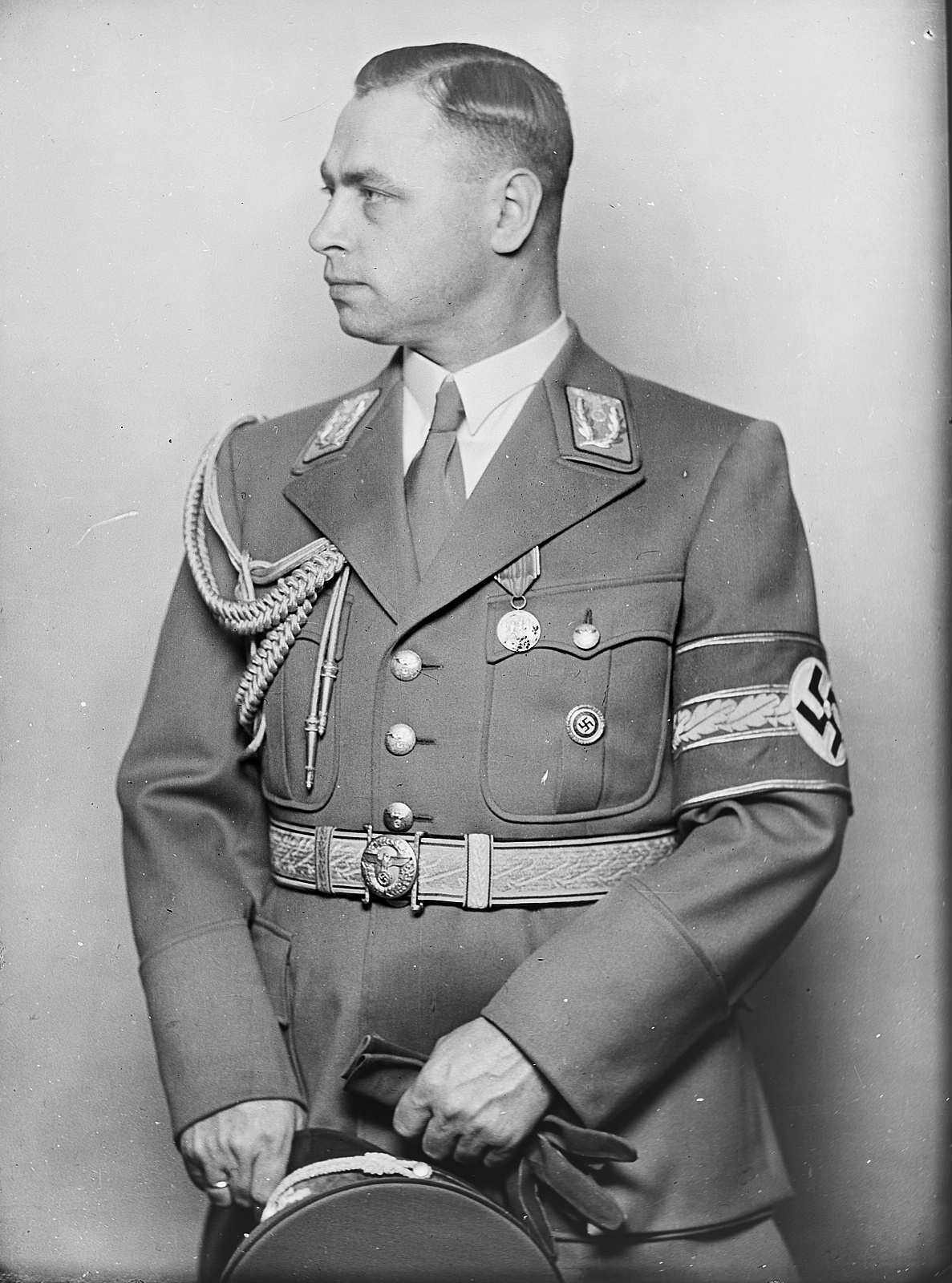
Josef Grohé, Gauleiter of Gau Cologne-Aachen 1931–1945 Photo: Hugo Erfurth

The Nazi Gau (plural Gaue) system was originally established in a party conference on 22 May 1926, in order to improve administration of the party structure. In 1931, the Rhineland Gau was divided in two, and Josef Grohé became Gauleiter of the newly formed Gau Cologne-Aachen, a post he would retain until April 1945. From 1933 onwards, after the Nazi seizure of power, the Gaue increasingly replaced the German states as administrative subdivisions in Germany.

At the head of each Gau stood a Gauleiter, a position which became increasingly more powerful, especially after the outbreak of the Second World War, with little interference from above. Local Gauleiters often held government positions as well as party ones and were in charge of, among other things, propaganda and surveillance and, from September 1944 onward, the Volkssturm and the defense of the Gau.

=== Territorial expansion ===
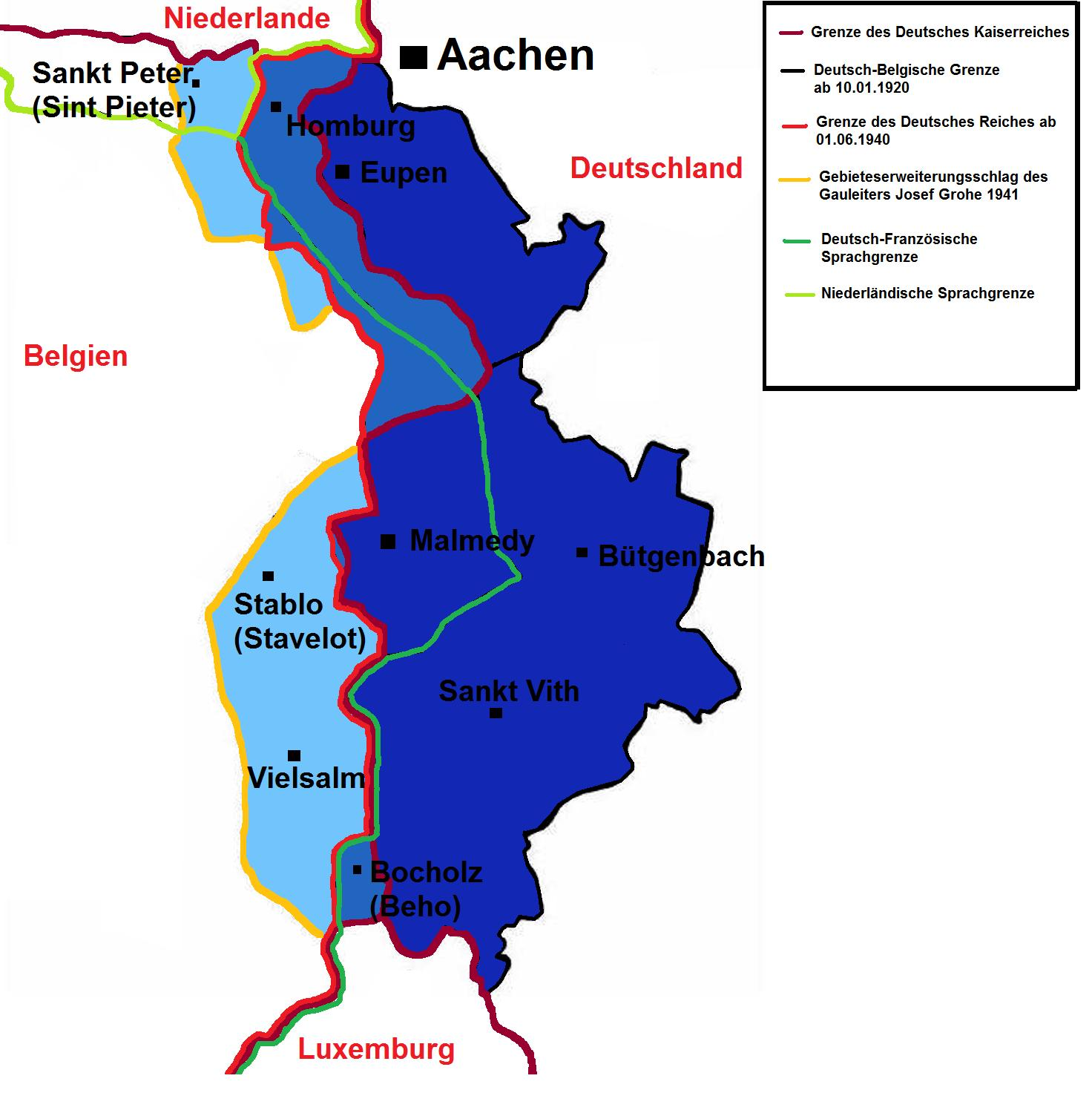
Map of territorial changes affecting Eupen-Malmedy between 1920 and 1945, reflecting territorial expansion of Gau Cologne-Aachen.

In World War II, Nazi Germany invaded Belgium in May 1940 and rapidly defeated and occupied Belgium for a second time. On 18 May, Hitler announced the re-integration of Eupen-Malmedy into Germany while the rest of the country remained under military occupation, leading to the Gau's westward territorial expansion. The Belgian government in exile, however, refused to recognise the German annexation and maintained that Eupen-Malmedy was part of Belgium. Further annexation plans by Grohé, which aimed to include non-German-speaking areas to a greater extent, including places like Vielsalm and Stavelot, did not succeed.

=== Allied bombardment ===
The Gau's capital, Cologne, was bombed in 262 separate air raids by the Allies during World War II, all by the Royal Air Force (RAF). A total of 34,711 long tons of bombs were dropped on the city by the RAF. 20,000 civilians died during the war in Cologne due to aerial bombardments.

While air raid alarms had gone off in the winter/spring of 1940 as British bombers passed overhead, the first bombing took place on 12 May 1940. The 30/31 May 1942 attack on Cologne was the first 1,000 bomber raid. Although Grohé was charged with responsibility for civil defense measures, there was little he could do to protect his jurisdiction from Allied air attacks, though he was awarded the War Merit Cross first class with Swords for his efforts in assisting the residents of his Gau.

=== Allied invasion and occupation ===
==== Initial allied incursions ====
Allied forces crossed into the Gau in September 1944.

===== Aachen =====
Allied forces crossed into the border near Aachen on 12 September 1944. On 13 September, von Schwerin was ordered to launch a counterattack against American forces penetrating southwest of Aachen, which he did, using elements of his panzergrenadier forces. The United States' VII Corps continued to probe German defenses, despite the resistance encountered on 12–13 September. Between 14 and 16 September the US 1st Infantry Division continued its advance in the face of strong defenses and repeated counterattacks, ultimately creating a half-moon arc around the city. This slow advance came to a halt in late September, due to the supply problem, and the diversion of existing stocks of fuel and ammunition for Operation Market Garden in the Netherlands.

In October 1944 ensues the Battle of Aachen. The city had been incorporated into the Siegfried Line, the main defensive network on Germany's western border; the Allies had hoped to capture it quickly and advance into the industrialized Ruhr Basin. Although most of Aachen's civilian population was evacuated before the battle began, much of the city was destroyed and both sides suffered heavy losses. It was one of the largest urban battles fought by U.S. forces in World War II. The battle ended with a German surrender, but their tenacious defense significantly disrupted Allied plans for the advance into Germany.

===== Eupen =====
Eupen, near the German-Belgian border, had been annexed into the Gau in 1940. The German-Belgian frontier was crossed by the allies in September 1944, with Eupen being captured on the 11th.

==== Geilenkirchen ====
In November 1944, Operation Clipper led to the allies advancing in the area surrounding Geilenkirchen, in the western part of the Gau.

==== Allied advance stalls, German counterattacks ====
In the Battle of Hürtgen Forest from 19 September to 16 December 1944, the Germans successfully held back and stalled allied advance into the Gau.

In December 1944, Germany launched the Ardennes Offensive, putting the allies on the defensive and stalling their advance into Gau Cologne-Aachen. The offensive resulted in parts of the southwestern Gau near Malmedy being retaken by Germany.

==== Renewed allied advance ====
Operation Blackcock was an operation to clear German troops from the Roer Triangle, formed by the towns of Roermond and Sittard in the Netherlands and Heinsberg in Germany during the fighting on the Western Front in the Second World War. It was conducted by the British Second Army between 13 and 26 January 1945.

On 25 January 1945, the allies captured Brachelen and reached the Ruhr, though advance beyond the Ruhr did not commence until a month later with Operation Grenade.

==== Gau capital falls to the allies ====
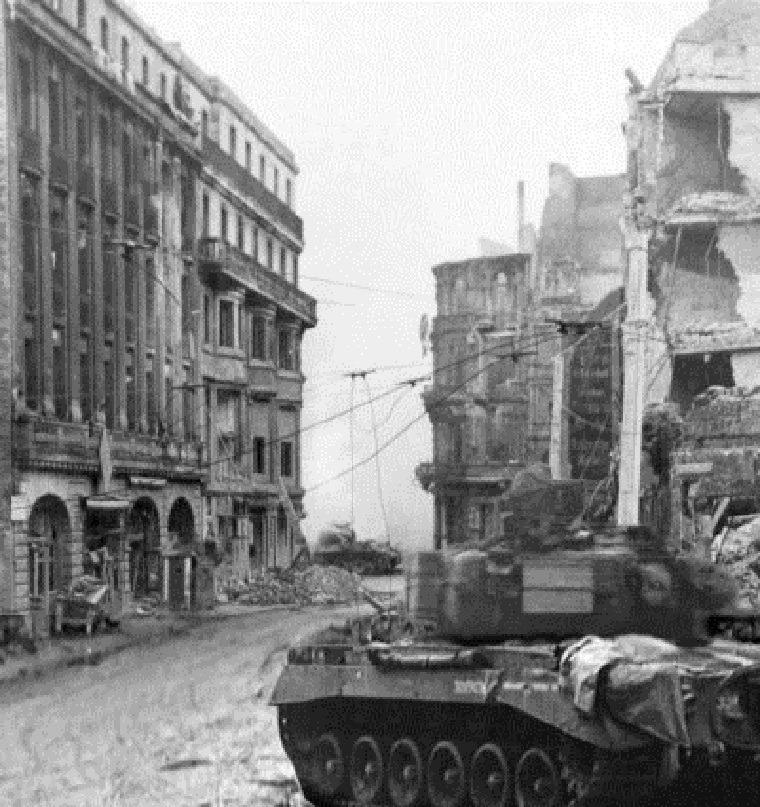
Allied advance into Cologne, the Gau's capital.

The Battle of Cologne was part of Operation Lumberjack and refers to the Allied advance that took place from 5 to 7 March 1945, which led to the capture of the Gau's capital. The allies captured Bonn shortly after.

==== Timeline of allied advance ====
The timeline of the allied advance is detailed in the table below.

Date of capture	Location	Reference
11 September 1944	Eupen	
14 September 1944	Kornelimünster	
16 September 1944	Schevenhütte	
17 September 1944	Malmedy	
2 October 1944	Palenberg	
3 October 1944	Übach	
4 October 1944	Hovendorf, Roetgen	
4 October 1944	Beggendorf	
5 October 1944	Merkstein-Herbach	
8 October 1944	Verlautenheide	
8 October 1944	Hill 231	
12 October 1944	Birk	
13–21 October 1944	Aachen	
18 November 1944	Rischden	
18 November 1944	Tripsrath	
19 November 1944	Geilenkirchen	
Night of 19–20 November	Süggerath	
20 November 1944	Prummern	
20 November 1944	Bauchem	
21-22 November 1944	Mahogany Hill	
22 November 1944	Eschweiler	
29 November 1944	Hürtgen	
3 December 1944	Linnich	
6 December 1944	Bergstein	
12 December 1944	Strass	
12 December 1944	Gey	
24 January 1945	Heinsberg	
25 January 1945	Brachelen	
11 February 1945	Niederzier	
23 February 1945	Jülich	
25 February 1945	Düren	
25 February 1945	Binsfeld (Nörvenich)	
26 February 1945	Erkelenz	
27 February 1945	Elsdorf	
27 February 1945	Vettweiß	
27 February 1945	Sindorf (Kerpen)	
28 February 1945	Glesch	
1 March 1945	Bergheim	
2 March 1945	Niederaußem	
3-4 March 1945	Weilerswist	
5 March 1945	Rösberg	
5–7 March 1945	Cologne	
8–9 March 1945	Bonn	
26 March 1945	Eitorf	
8 April 1945	Gau dissolved, some territories remain under German control	
9-11 April 1945	Siegburg	
12 April 1945	Refrath	
12 April 1945	Hoffnungsthal Camp	
13 April 1945	Wipperfürth	
13 April 1945	Lindlar	
13 April 1945	Bensberg	
13 April 1945	Overath	

=== Fall of the Gau ===
With the allies having made significant inroads into the Gau, Grohé dissolved the Gau on 8 April 1945 and fled toward the Ore Mountains where he stayed until the end of the war before returning to western Germany. In his diary entry of 3 April 1945, Joseph Goebbels harshly criticized Grohé's actions:

Our Gauleiters both in the West and the East have acquired a bad habit: having lost their Gau, they defend themselves in long memoranda seeking to prove that they were in no way responsible. For instance there is another one of these exposés, this time from Grohé. It is not in the least convincing. Despite a series of pompous declarations, Grohé has not defended his Gau. He deserted it before the civil population had been removed and now wants to present himself as a great hero.

Grohé made a suicide attempt at the end of the war, escaped under a false name, was arrested in 1946 and sentenced to four and a half years in prison but never repented his views and died in 1987.

== Geography and demographics ==
The Gau had a size of 7,100 km2 (2,741 sq mi) and a population of 2,300,000, which placed it in mid-table for size and population in the list of Gaue.
