= Military Administration in Belgium and Northern France =

German occupational authority (1940–1944)

Military Administration in Belgium and Northern France Militärverwaltung in Belgien und Nordfrankreich (German)
- 1940–1944
- Flag Emblem

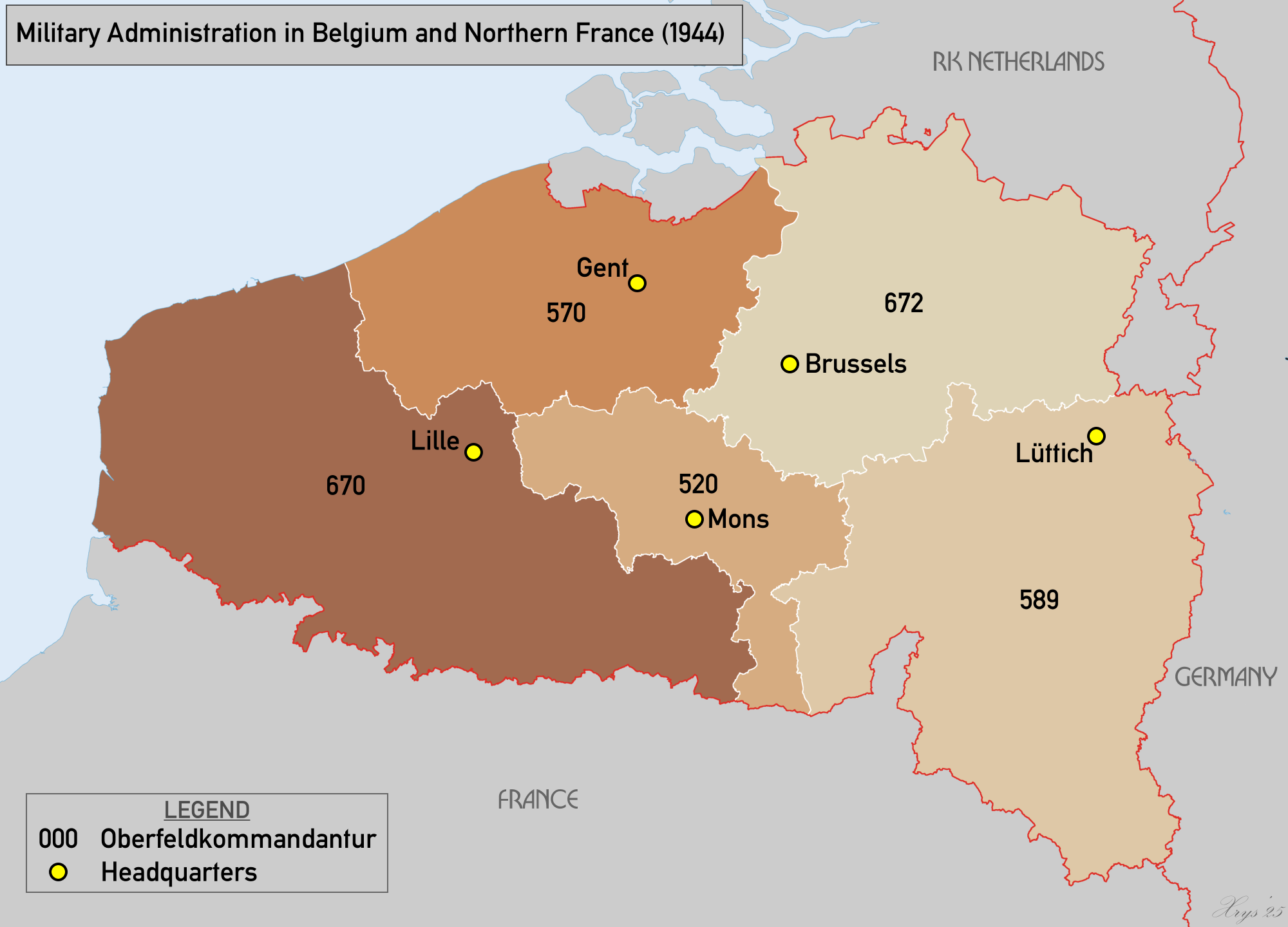
- Military Administration in Belgium and Northern France showing Districts and HQs
- Status: Territory under German military administration
- Capital: Brussels
- Military Commander
  - 1940: Gerd von Rundstedt
  - 1940–1944: Alexander von Falkenhausen
- Administrator
  - 1940–1944: Eggert Reeder
- Historical era: World War II
  - Established: 1940
  - Disestablished: 1944
- Currency: Belgian franc
| Preceded by | Succeeded by |
| Belgium; French Third Republic | Reichskommissariat Belgien-Nordfrankreich |
- Today part of: Belgium; France

The Military Administration in Belgium and Northern France (German: Militärverwaltung in Belgien und Nordfrankreich) was an interim occupation authority established during the Second World War by Nazi Germany that included present-day Belgium and the French departments of Nord and Pas-de-Calais. It remained in existence until July 1944. Plans to transfer Belgium from the military administration to a civilian administration were promoted by the SS, and Hitler had been ready to do so until Autumn 1942, when he put off the plans for what was intended to be temporary but ended up being permanent until the end of German occupation. The SS had suggested either Josef Terboven or Ernst Kaltenbrunner as the Reich Commissioner of the civilian administration.

== Reichskommissariat ==
On 13 July 1944, the Military Administration was replaced by a civil one, led by the Gauleiter, Josef Grohé, who was named the Reichskommissar of the Reichskommissariat Belgien-Nordfrankreich.

== Role of collaborationist groups ==
The Nazi administration was assisted by fascist Flemish, Walloon, and French collaborationists. In binational Belgian territory, the predominantly French region of Wallonia, the collaborationist Rexists provided aid to the Nazis while in Flemish-populated Flanders, the Flemish National Union supported the Nazis. In Northern France, Flemish separatist tendencies were stirred by the pro-Nazi Vlaamsch Verbond van Frankrijk led by priest Jean-Marie Gantois.

The attachment of the departments Nord and Pas-de-Calais to the military administration in Brussels was initially made on military considerations, and was supposedly done in preparation for the planned invasion of Britain. Ultimately, the attachment was based on Hitler's intention to move the Reich's border westward, and was also used to maintain pressure on the Vichy regime – which protested the curtailment of its authority in what was still de jure national French territory – to ensure its good behavior.

== Command structure ==
The Military Administration formed the core of a wider command structure which allowed the governance of occupied Belgium. It could rely on both military and civilian components:

Military Administration in Belgium and Northern France; Militärverwaltung in Belgien und Nordfrankreich; Part of the Wehrmacht; Militärbefehlshaber: Alexander von Falkenhausen
Military Administrative Staff; Militärverwaltungsstab; Militärverwaltungschef: Eggert Reeder
(Belgium); Committee of Secretaries-General; Representatives of the Belgian civil administration | Economic Department; Wirtschaftsabteilung
(Belgium); Belgian civil service: Burgomasters and local government; Belgian police and state security | Regional and district headquarters: Oberfeld-, Feld- or Kreiskommandanten

(Nazi Germany); Sipo-SD; Part of the Sicherheitspolizei-Sicherheitsdienst; Independent of the Military Administration and directed from Berlin.
Command Staff; Kommandostab; Chef des Kommandostabs: Bodo von Harbou
Feldgendarmerie and Geheime Feldpolizei | (Nazi Germany); Geheime Staatspolizei (Gestapo); Part of the SS
Belgian collaborationist groups Principally the Vlaams Nationaal Verbond (VNV) or Rex; Each with internal command structure.

Based on description in Van den Wijngaert, Mark; Dujardin, Vincent (2006). "La Belgique sans Roi, 1940-1950". Nouvelle Historie de Belgique. Vol. 2: 1905-1950. Brussels: Éd. Complexe. pp. 19–20. ISBN 2-8048-0078-4.

== See also ==
- Battle of Belgium
- Belgium in World War II
- Reichsgau Flandern
- Reichsgau Wallonien
- District of Brussels
