= New Order (Nazism) =

Proposed political order by Nazi Germany

The term New Order (German: Neuordnung) refers to the political and social concepts Nazi Germany sought to impose on German-occupied Europe and beyond.

Planning for the Neuordnung began before World War II, but Adolf Hitler first proclaimed a "European New Order" in a speech on 30 January 1941.

The New Order embodied the Nazi vision of a pan-German racial state structured to benefit an alleged Aryan-Nordic master race. It outlined the German colonization of Central and Eastern Europe, alongside the Holocaust against Jews and wider destruction of Romani people and others deemed "unworthy of life". The plan also entailed the extermination, expulsion, or enslavement of most Slavic peoples and others classified as Untermenschen (subhumans). Nazi Germany's aggressive pursuit of this territorial expansion (Lebensraum) was a primary cause of World War II.

Historians debate the ultimate scope of the New Order: whether it was exclusively a continental project limited to Europe, or a roadmap for an eventual Germanocentric world government.

== Origin of the term ==
The term Neuordnung—an abbreviation of die Neuordnung Europas ("the New Order of Europe") (Note: Not to be confused with the neo-fascist alliance New European Order, founded in 1951 as an alleged "Black International".)—was used by the Nazi establishment to denote a planned reorganization of the geopolitical landscape.

The Nazi government claimed Neuordnung aimed to rearrange territory for the benefit of an economically integrated Europe, deliberately excluding the Soviet Union. Nazi ideology characterized the "Judeo-Bolshevist" Soviet state as a criminal, so called "Asiatic" institution slated for destruction, viewing it as culturally devoid of Germanic-European character and intolerable to the Third Reich.

The phrase gained resonance in Western media through Nazi propaganda. In English-language academia, it refers to the civic policies and war aims of the Third Reich, drawing parallels to Imperial Japan's "Greater East Asia Co-Prosperity Sphere".

== Ideological background ==
=== Nazi bio-politics ===
The Nazis implemented a strict racial hierarchy founded upon pseudo-scientific beliefs and practices. At its apex was the "master race", composed of the purest stock of the Aryan race. The Nazis idealized the Nordic race as its strongest manifestation, relegating all other racial types to an "inferior" status. Believing that Nordic peoples predominantly created and maintained Western civilization, the Nazis claimed this qualitative superiority entitled them to global domination—a concept known as Nordicism.

=== Geopolitical strategy ===
Hitler's ideas about eastward expansion, outlined in Mein Kampf, were heavily influenced by Karl Haushofer during Hitler's 1924 imprisonment. Haushofer argued that Germany had to control the Eurasian heartland to permanently secure its role as a global power. Italy and Japan were viewed as ideally situated to complement this German control, geopolitically shielding Germany's insular position with their regional naval power.

=== Anticipated territorial extent of Nazi imperialism ===
The need for a dominant global power was central to Hitler's worldview. In a 1930 speech at Erlangen University, Hitler proclaimed that no people held a greater right to seize "control" of the globe (Weltherrschaft, i.e., "world leadership") than the Germans. This echoed a 1927 letter by Rudolf Hess paraphrasing Hitler's belief that world peace required the "racially best" power to attain uncontested supremacy. This power would act as a world police force, guaranteeing living space for the master race while restricting lower races.

== Implementation in Europe ==
=== Preceding the War ===
The 1938 Anschluss of Austria advanced the Pan-Germanist cause and strategically encircled Czechoslovakia. This facilitated the partition of Czechoslovakia, with Germany annexing the Sudetenland and establishing the Protectorate of Bohemia and Moravia. Slovakia became a German puppet state. The First Vienna Award subsequently offered territorial concessions to Hungary and Poland, drawing them into the German sphere of influence.

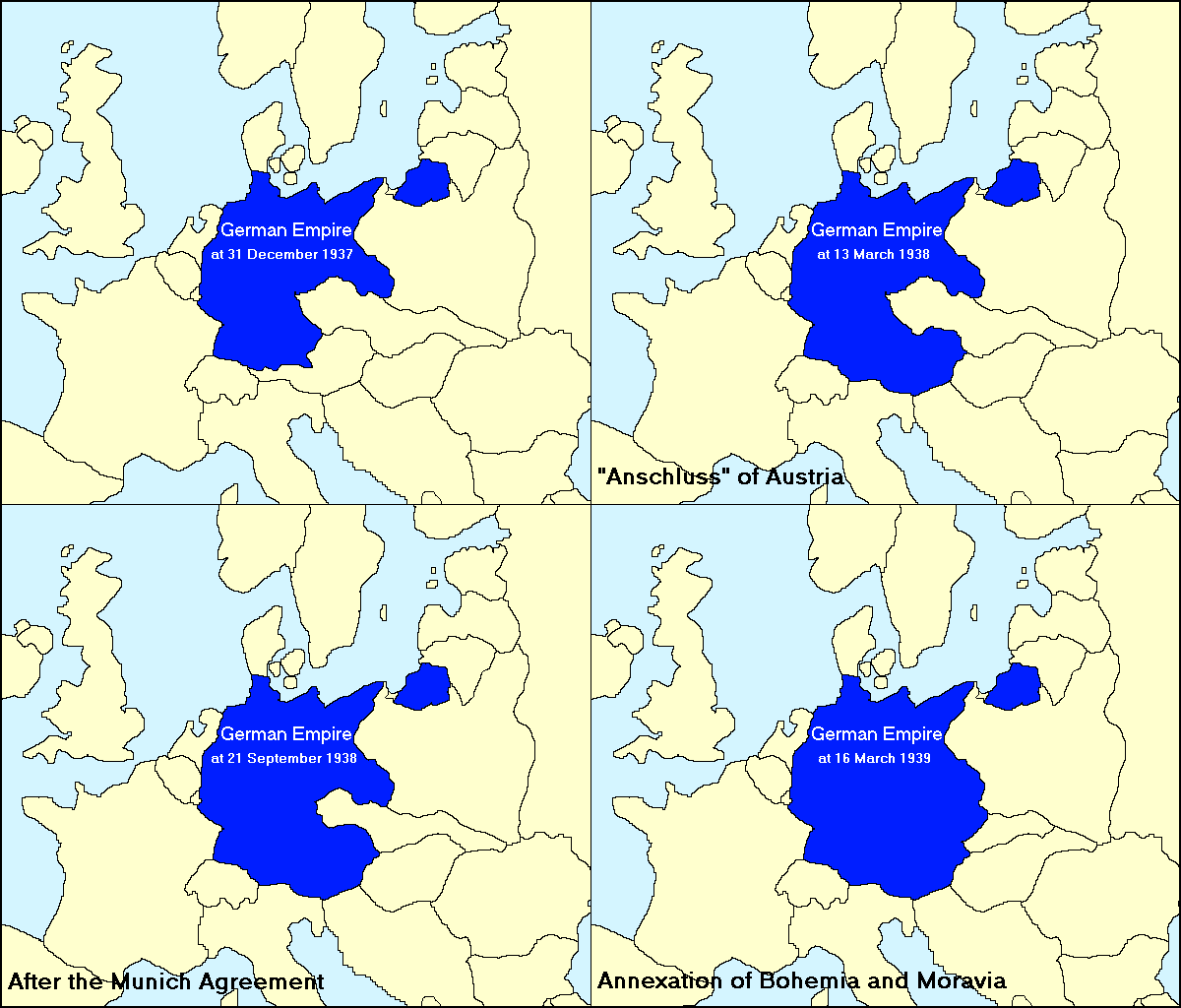
Territorial evolution of Germany prior to the Danzig crisis, based on the Hossbach Memorandum's short-term definition of Lebensraum.

Germany then planned its Ostpolitik, proposing a barrier of client states from Finland to Romania to contain Soviet expansionism. This strategy aimed to economically subordinate Germany's eastern neighbors, utilizing existing German settlements to balkanize them, reverse territorial losses, and prepare for the conquest of Lebensraum. The Reich advanced this agenda through the German–Romanian Treaty, the 1939 German ultimatum to Lithuania, and the expansion of the Anti-Comintern Pact.

The Reich's failure to subordinate Poland during the Danzig crisis shifted Hitler's strategy. Following the formation of the Anglo-Polish alliance, which threatened Germany with a two-front war, Nazi leadership determined that an independent Poland was no longer geopolitically viable. Viewed as an Anglo-French buffer state, Polish territories were partially conceded to the Soviet Union to prevent a Soviet alignment with the Western Powers. This secured Germany's eastern flank, postponing the pursuit of Lebensraum until France and Britain were defeated.

The Molotov–Ribbentrop Pact allowed Germany and the Soviet Union to partition Eastern Europe, temporarily aligning Soviet territorial interests with Germany's agenda. A significant step toward Hitler's New Order, the agreement tacitly sought to restore the former spheres of influence of the Russian, German, and Austro-Hungarian empires from the Baltic Sea to the Balkans. This vision included the partition of Poland, recognizing Romania, Hungary, Slovakia, the Protectorate of Bohemia and Moravia, and Lithuania as projected German puppet states. Finland, Estonia, Latvia, and Bessarabia were ceded to the Soviet sphere. The treaty was subsequently amended; most of Lithuania was transferred to the Soviets in exchange for Germany gaining Lublin and Lesser Poland. Furthermore, Stalin's opposition to a residual Polish state led to the establishment of the General Government under direct German administration.

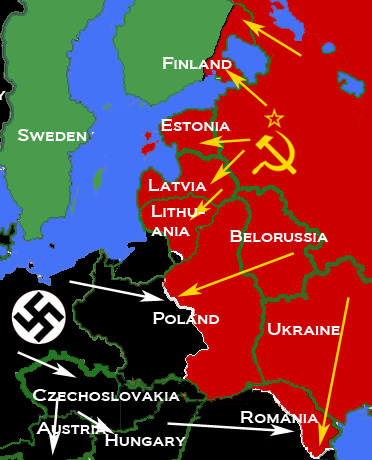
Nazi-Soviet de facto partition of Eastern Europe

Polish resistance satirical poster – "New European Order" (German: Die Neuordnung Europas) – Polish reaction to Hitler's plans to establish a "new order" in Europe, under the domination of Nazi Germany. In the middle: Adolf Hitler; background: imprisoned European nations (France, Bulgaria, the Netherlands, Yugoslavia, Belgium, Greece, Poland, Hungary).

Despite these concessions, the Nazis remained unsatisfied and engaged with anti-Soviet agents regarding Eastern Poland. Prior to the Soviet occupation of Eastern Poland, Germany made overtures to Lithuania, promising the Vilnius Region in exchange for assistance during the Invasion of Poland. Similar offers were made to Hungary regarding Turka and Sambir. Germany also approached the Organisation of Ukrainian Nationalists with plans for a pro-Nazi Ukrainian puppet state, and explored potential collaboration with Polish fascists to establish Central Poland as a German protectorate.

=== Military campaigns in Poland and Western Europe ===
The initial phases of the New Order included the signing of the Molotov-Ribbentrop Pact and the Blitzkrieg campaigns in Northern and Western Europe. The signing of the Molotov Pact on 23 August 1939, prior to the invasion of Poland, secured Germany's eastern border with the Soviet Union, prevented a two-front war, and circumvented expected raw material shortages from a British naval blockade. The campaigns in Northern and Western Europe (Operation Weserübung and the Battle of France), neutralizing western opposition. By early summer 1940, Germany had conquered Denmark, Norway, Luxembourg, Belgium, the Netherlands, and France. Following a projected British defeat, Germany intended to avoid a general peace conference (like the 1919 Paris Peace Conference), instead finalizing the political reordering of Western Europe exclusively through bilateral negotiations.

==== Plans for Great Britain ====
Throughout the 1930s, a primary German foreign policy objective was a military alliance with the United Kingdom. Despite adopting anti-British policies in 1939, German leadership maintained hope that the UK would eventually become a reliable ally. Hitler admired the British Empire and preferred its preservation as a world power, fearing its collapse would disproportionately benefit the United States and the Japanese Empire. German planners envisioned a defeated Britain fulfilling a role similar to the Austrian Empire after the 1866 Austro-Prussian War: excluded from continental affairs, but maintaining its colonies as a seafaring partner.

Historian William L. Shirer notes that German occupation plans included transferring British men aged 17 to 45 to the continent for slave labor. The UK was to be stripped of its financial, industrial, and cultural assets, with its manufacturing output redirected to support the Eastern Front. The Einsatzgruppen, led by Franz Six, were tasked with executing political, intellectual, and public figures who opposed Nazism. Furthermore, Otto Bräutigam of the Reich Ministry for the Occupied Eastern Territories later claimed that Heinrich Himmler intended for the Sicherheitsdienst to exterminate roughly 80% of the French and British populations following a German victory.

Contingent upon the invasion of Great Britain (Operation Sea Lion), Germany planned to invade neutral Ireland (Operation Green). By occupying northeastern France, Hitler intended to marginalize Britain and prevent future continental challenges. While evidence suggests the monarchy would have survived, Germany explored fragmenting the UK. Proposals included uniting Northern Ireland with the Republic of Ireland to secure support from the Irish Republican Army (which drafted Plan Kathleen), and establishing an independent, republican Scotland as a socialist-nationalist counterweight to capitalist England. Ultimately, neither Britain nor Ireland was invaded.

==== Plans for France ====
Nazi Germany viewed historical French belligerence—from the Thirty Years' War to the Treaty of Versailles—as a permanent threat. Anticipating a rapid conclusion to the western campaign, Hitler sought to turn France into a long-term vassal state so he could focus on his Ostpolitik. In May 1940, Hitler instructed Interior Ministry State Secretary Wilhelm Stuckart to draft proposals for a new western border. Stuckart's June 1940 memorandum proposed annexing territories in Eastern France that were historically part of the Holy Roman Empire, establishing a "Westraum" for the Reich. Short-term plans involved integrating Inner Rhineland border areas and the Ruhr with Alsace–Lorraine, Eupen-Malmedy, the Saarland, Luxembourg, Belgium, the Netherlands, and northeastern France. Longer-term ambitions included annexing Switzerland, Burgundy, and Savoy (stretching to the Mediterranean Sea, akin to historical Lotharingia) into the Gau Westmark.

Factual administration of France under Nazi Germany during World War II.

To accomplish this, Germany occupied the Low Countries to strip France of its buffer states and natural borders along the Rhine. Germany then planned to annex Northern France (Nord and Pas-de-Calais) alongside the formal re-annexation of Alsace and Moselle. German strategists also prepared to colonize the Zone interdite in the Somme, Aisne, and Ardennes to establish a Germanic Thiois buffer zone (Project Burgund). The Armistice of 22 June 1940 formalized French economic subordination, established the collaborationist Vichy France regime, and created a military occupation zone to construct the Atlantic Wall. Germany also considered rewarding Italy with the occupation of Corsica, Nice, and Savoy. Broadly, the Latin nations (Portugal, Spain, and Italy) were to be reduced to total German dependency.

German planners sought to permanently integrate France into the New Order by exploiting reactionary and crypto-fascist collaborationist movements, such as the French Popular Party and the National Popular Rally. While Nazi ideologues generally distrusted traditionalist Catholic and aristocratic elements (viewing their values as incompatible with totalitarian Nazism), Hitler pragmatically supported movements like Action Française to destabilize the liberal French Third Republic. Germany ultimately hoped to co-opt Vichy France's Révolution nationale, purging its royalist and ultramontane elements to fully fascisize the state and utilize French cultural influence to spread fascism throughout Western civilization.

Hitler also supported separatist movements resentful of French centralism and coercive Francization. This strategy served to fragment the country and threaten French politicians with the prospect of permanent Balkanization. German authorities engaged with Breton nationalists, offering vague prospects of an independent Breton state to maintain leverage over Vichy France. Similar exploratory contacts were made with Basque nationalist leaders, such as Eugène Goyheneche, regarding a potential puppet state to exert pressure on both France and Spain.

==== Plans for Netherlands ====
Nazi Germany considered the Dutch people and the Walloons of the Benelux region racially assimilable. Initially, German authorities tolerated local fascist groups like the Vlaamsch Nationaal Verbond and Nederlandsche Unie, which sought a self-determining Greater Netherlands under Nazi patronage. Dutch fascists, led by Anton Mussert, envisioned a "Dietsland" (uniting the Netherlands and Flanders) that would operate as a maritime equal to Germany. Mussert argued that Dutch colonial expertise was vital for defending the colonial empire against British and Japanese rivals, proposing the reclamation of historical territories (such as the Dutch Cape Colony and New Netherland) to unite the Dutch Volk. Hitler offered non-committal responses regarding the Dutch East Indies to string along Dutch collaborators, while privately conceding the territory to Japan.

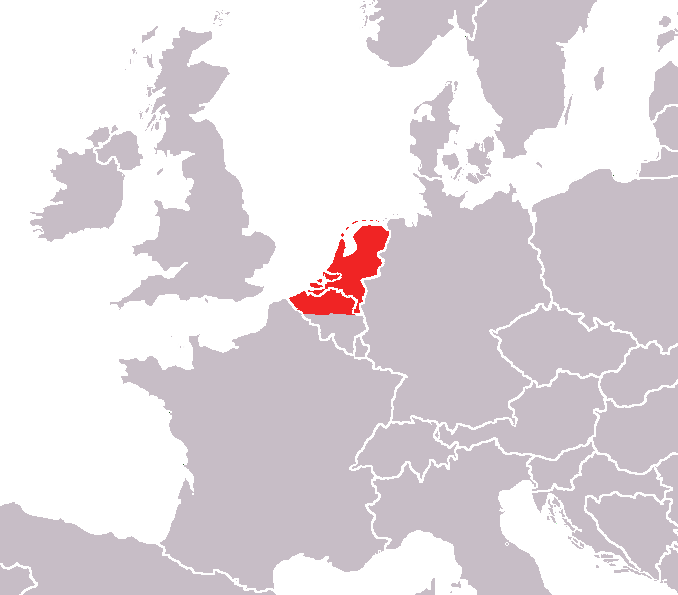
Projected Dietsland province of the Greater Germanic Reich

However, Germany's long-term goal was the complete annexation of the Low Countries into the Reich, later accelerated by the 1944 creation of Reichsgau Flandern and Reichsgau Wallonien. German administrators implemented Flamenpolitik—promoting Germanist groups like DeVlag and the National Socialist Movement of the Netherlands to dissolve distinct national identities. The Nazis viewed the Dutch and Flemish people merely as regional variants of the German race speaking a German dialect. In the New Order, the Low Countries were expected to provide settlers for the Lebensraum in Eastern Europe. The SS argued that the era of maritime colonialism was obsolete, insisting that valuable Dutch "Aryan" blood should be used to colonize Soviet territory rather than mixing with populations in the tropics.

Adolf Hitler also reportedly considered establishing a "Burgundian Free State" in 1943, as relayed to Heinrich Himmler's personal physician, Felix Kersten. This proposed state, modeled on the medieval Burgundian State and governed by the SS under Léon Degrelle, would have encompassed Picardy, Artois, Hainault, Champagne, Luxembourg, Lorraine, Franche-Comté, Burgundy, Dauphiné, and Provence. Hitler considered making either Rheims or Troyes the capital of this Lotharingian state. Himmler envisioned Burgundy as a model state, allegedly telling Kersten that France, due to its perceived degeneracy, would be stripped of its unjustly annexed territories and reduced to a minor state known merely as "Gaul."

==== Plans for Northern Europe ====
Nazi philosophers held the Nordic countries in high esteem, categorizing their populations as "racially suitable" Aryans due to their shared Germanic heritage. The Nazis viewed the Viking expansion as a historical model and considered Scandinavians racially purer than Southern Germans, as they were free from the perceived miscegenation promoted by the Habsburg monarchy, the House of Wittelsbach, and the Catholic Church. Consequently, Nordic populations were slated for relatively lenient treatment under occupation, though resistance was met with strict suppression. The Germanic SS was tasked with cultivating a pro-Germanic elite to facilitate the region's eventual absorption into the Reich. Local fascist movements, such as the National Socialist Workers' Party of Denmark and the National Socialist Workers' Party (Sweden), proposed a Nazi-sponsored Scandinavian alliance akin to the Kalmar Union to serve as a bulwark against Soviet expansionism. However, the Nazis expected these movements to renounce historical imperial ambitions (such as the Swedish Empire), intending instead to turn the Baltic Sea into a "Germanic Lake." This friction alienated some Nordic fascists, who advocated for a polycentric international fascism rather than strict subservience to the Rome-Berlin Axis. In response, Germany prepared to leverage Norwegian nationalist and anti-Swedish sentiment to pressure Denmark and Sweden into compliance.

===== Plans for Denmark =====
Prior to the war, Nazi Germany sought Non-aggression pacts with the Nordic countries, though only Denmark accepted (German-Danish Non-Aggression Pact). Following the invasions of Denmark and Norway, the Reich justified its actions as necessary to circumvent the Allied blockade, promising to respect Danish sovereignty. Uniquely among occupied nations, Denmark maintained its domestic institutions, including the Folketing and the Danish monarchy under Christian X of Denmark. However, Germany applied heavy pressure on the Danish government to suppress opposition, such as the Danish Communist Party, and to subordinate its economy to the Reich by transferring industrial capital and labor to Germany. Growing Danish resistance eventually led to the 1943 Operation Safari, resulting in the dissolution of the Danish government and the disarmament of its military.

===== Plans for Norway =====
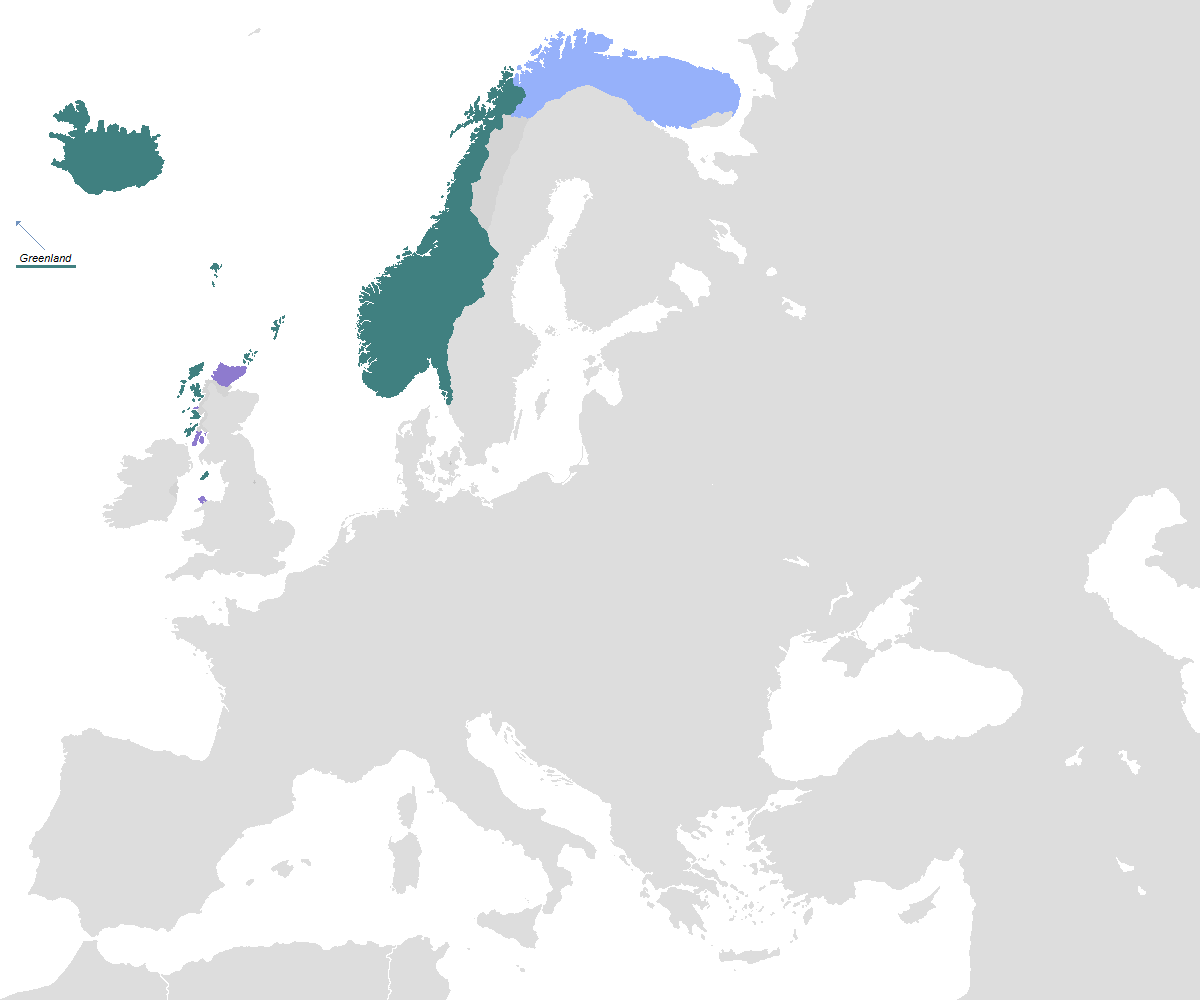
Norwegian irredentist claims to the former territory of the Kingdom of Norway (872–1397) were proposed by Quisling regime to Nazi Germany for the New Order.

In occupied Norway, Germany initially sought to negotiate with the government of Haakon VII. They ultimately established the Quisling regime—a puppet state nominally led by Norwegian fascist Vidkun Quisling—while actual authority remained with the Reichskommissariat Norwegen under Josef Terboven. Although the Nazis occasionally signaled that Norway might eventually regain nominal independence as a northern province, they treated Quisling's movement primarily as an occupying tool. The Germanic SS considered supporting Norwegian irredentist claims to the Faroes, Orkney, Shetland, the Outer Hebrides, Iceland, and potentially Greenland, contingent upon Norwegian military contributions and Danish compliance. Additional expansionist proposals included claiming polar territories to counter British and Russian Arctic interests, establishing an eastern territory (Austrveg) in the Kola Peninsula, and annexing Swedish provinces (Jämtland, Härjedalen, and Bohuslän) if Sweden joined the Allies. Furthermore, Germany planned to construct Nordstern, a heavily fortified, German-populated naval city in Norway to project power across the North Atlantic. Regarding Sweden, Germany maintained contingency plans for invasion throughout the war. Long-term goals included integrating Sweden into the Germanic Reich, empowering the National Socialist Workers' Party (Sweden), and extending the Holocaust by establishing concentration camps in Sjöbo and Stora Karlsö.

===== Plans for Finland =====
Initially, the Reich respected Finnish autonomy, valuing the nation as a co-belligerent. However, as Finnish officials considered seeking a separate peace with the Allies, Germany pressured Finland to become a fully dependent client state. Driven by nationalism and the memory of the Finnish Civil War, Finnish irredentists (including the Patriotic People's Movement and the Academic Karelia Society) sought to annex East Karelia and liberate Finnic peoples from Soviet rule. Nazi Germany supported these ambitions to weaken Soviet control and secure Northern Russia. During the occupation of East Karelia, Finnish authorities, aided by German ethnologists, segregated the population; ethnic Russians were placed in concentration camps for eventual expulsion, while Karelians underwent Finlandization and de-Stalinization programs. Additionally, Germany relocated 62,000 Ingrian Finns, Izhorians, and Votians to Finland, many fleeing the Soviet purges. Despite German pressure, the Finnish parliament refused to formally annex the newly occupied territories during the war, declaring that final borders would await a peace treaty and the findings of the State Scientific Committee of Eastern Karelia.

We don't dream of Novgorod or Moscow; the coasts of Syväri, Ääninen, and Vienna are enough for us.

— Ilkka

=== Plans for Southern Europe ===
==== Plans for the Iberian Peninsula ====
During the early years of the war, Spanish dictator Francisco Franco contemplated joining the Axis powers. In exchange, Falangist leaders presented numerous territorial claims to Adolf Hitler and Benito Mussolini. On June 16, 1940, Franco laid claim to the French Basque Country, Catalan-speaking Roussillon, Cerdagne, and Andorra. Spain also sought to annex Gibraltar from the United Kingdom for its strategic value, and called for the reunification of Morocco as a Spanish protectorate. Further demands included the annexation of the Oran district from French Algeria and the expansion of Spanish Guinea into French Cameroon. This latter project conflicted with Hitler's intention to reclaim German Cameroon. Additionally, Spain pursued a federation with Portugal based on historical ties like the Iberian Union. However, Hitler showed little interest in Franco's extensive irredentist demands, preferring to avoid the economic burden of supporting Spain and recognizing that Spanish ambitions clashed with Germany's need to cooperate with Vichy France. Hitler made only vague promises regarding French Morocco and Salazarist Portugal, instead pressing Franco to allow the Wehrmacht into the Iberian Peninsula if the Anglo-Portuguese Alliance was activated. Franco refused, fearing German betrayal and attempting to convince Hitler that Spain could achieve these conquests independently—a proposition German leadership dismissed due to their low estimation of Spanish military capabilities.

German leadership rejected the concept of an independent Greater Catalonia—as proposed by Spanish anarchists—viewing it as a traditional French buffer state that would secure French power in the Mediterranean. Conversely, the Axis powers favored a Greater Spain to strategically encircle France. The Nazis hoped to elevate Spain to counter French influence, forcing Spain to align permanently with the Italo-German coalition. Ultimately, however, Hitler intended to maintain Spain as a dependent client state. He confessed to General Franz Halder that his strategy was "to promise the Spanish anything they wanted, regardless of whether the promise could be fulfilled," aiming to limit Spanish empowerment to what strictly served German interests. Diplomat Eberhard von Stohrer summarized this dynamic: "Spain cannot expect us to provide them with a new colonial empire through our victories and receive nothing in return."

In the summer of 1940, Hitler considered occupying the Portuguese territories of the Azores, Cape Verde, and Madeira, as well as the Spanish Canary Islands, to deny the British a staging ground in the Atlantic. In September, Hitler offered Spanish Foreign Minister Ramón Serrano Súñer control of French Morocco in exchange for transferring one of the Canary Islands to German usage. Later that month, Serrano Súñer met with German Foreign Minister Joachim von Ribbentrop in Berlin to discuss Spain's potential entry into the war. The two diplomats quickly developed a mutual animosity. Ribbentrop informed Serrano Súñer that in return for military and economic aid—and allowing the return of Gibraltar—Germany required the annexation of at least one Canary Island, extraterritorial naval and air bases in Spanish Guinea and Spanish Morocco, and an economic treaty granting German companies control over Spanish mines. Serrano Súñer was reportedly shocked by these demands, which would have effectively reduced Spain to an economic colony and satellite state.

Following Spain's refusal to enter the war at the Meeting at Hendaye and the reinforcement of the Iberian Pact ensuring Portuguese neutrality, Germany planned to invade both nations under Operation Felix. The Iberian Peninsula was to be integrated into the Atlantic Wall, with coastal cities and islands seized for German naval facilities. Portugal would also be forced to cede Portuguese Mozambique and Portuguese Angola to Germany's Mittelafrika project. This strategic shift was accompanied by growing anti-Hispanic sentiment among German leadership. Hitler labeled the Spanish and Portuguese as opportunists for delaying their entry until Great Britain was defeated, viewing this hesitation as evidence of the "Latin race's" inferiority compared to the "Germanic race." Consequently, German military advisors concluded that Spain's internal deterioration made it a useless political partner, determining that Germany should seize its essential objectives, such as Gibraltar, without Spanish participation.

==== Plans for Italian Sphere in Mediterranean Europe ====
Initially focused on Northern Europe and Eastern Europe, Nazi Germany's short-term interest in the Mediterranean World was primarily military, aiming to prevent an Allied invasion through Fascist Italy or Yugoslavia. Although Hitler personally respected Benito Mussolini, Nazi leadership generally viewed Italians as racially inferior and ideologically impure. Consequently, the Pact of Steel functioned more as a marriage of convenience than a partnership of equals. The two regimes harbored mutual distrust regarding their respective spheres of influence, with Italy viewing Germany as a threat to its interests in Central Europe and the Balkans. Radical adherents of the Volksgemeinschaft anticipated a future conflict with Italy over the Tyrolean Question, which they viewed as an opportunity to subordinate Italy and establish the Third Reich as the sole successor to the Roman Empire. Nazi racial theorists justified this by claiming the patrician elite of the Roman Empire were actually of Aryan descent. Conversely, Italian fascists often viewed Germanic peoples as uncultured barbarians, arguing that the "Italian Race" derived its superiority from its Roman cultural legacy rather than strict biological purity.

German contempt for Latin Europe was evident during the Meeting at Hendaye and the subsequent Montoire and Saint-Florentin meetings, where Vichy France was consolidated as a subordinate client state and a source of slave labor. Despite Pétain's offers of closer collaboration, Nazi leadership prevented the restoration of French sovereignty, intending to exploit the French economy permanently. In response to German dominance, Mussolini and Franco promoted the formation of a Latin Bloc—a "Rome-Madrid axis" incorporating Vichy France. While nominally aligned with the Axis goal of expelling the British from the Mediterranean basin (targeting Gibraltar, Malta, and Cyprus), the Bloc also served to balance power against German hegemony. In 1941, Fascist Romania proposed expanding the alliance to the Black Sea, and António de Oliveira Salazar expressed interest in incorporating Portugal. Vichy diplomats even attempted to recruit Vatican City to legitimize the Bloc through Catholic social teaching, though Pope Pius XII refused to endorse the overtly totalitarian and anti-Semitic regimes. Nazi Germany viewed these pan-Latin maneuverings with intense suspicion, actively working to undermine the project's viability.

===== Plans for the Balkans =====
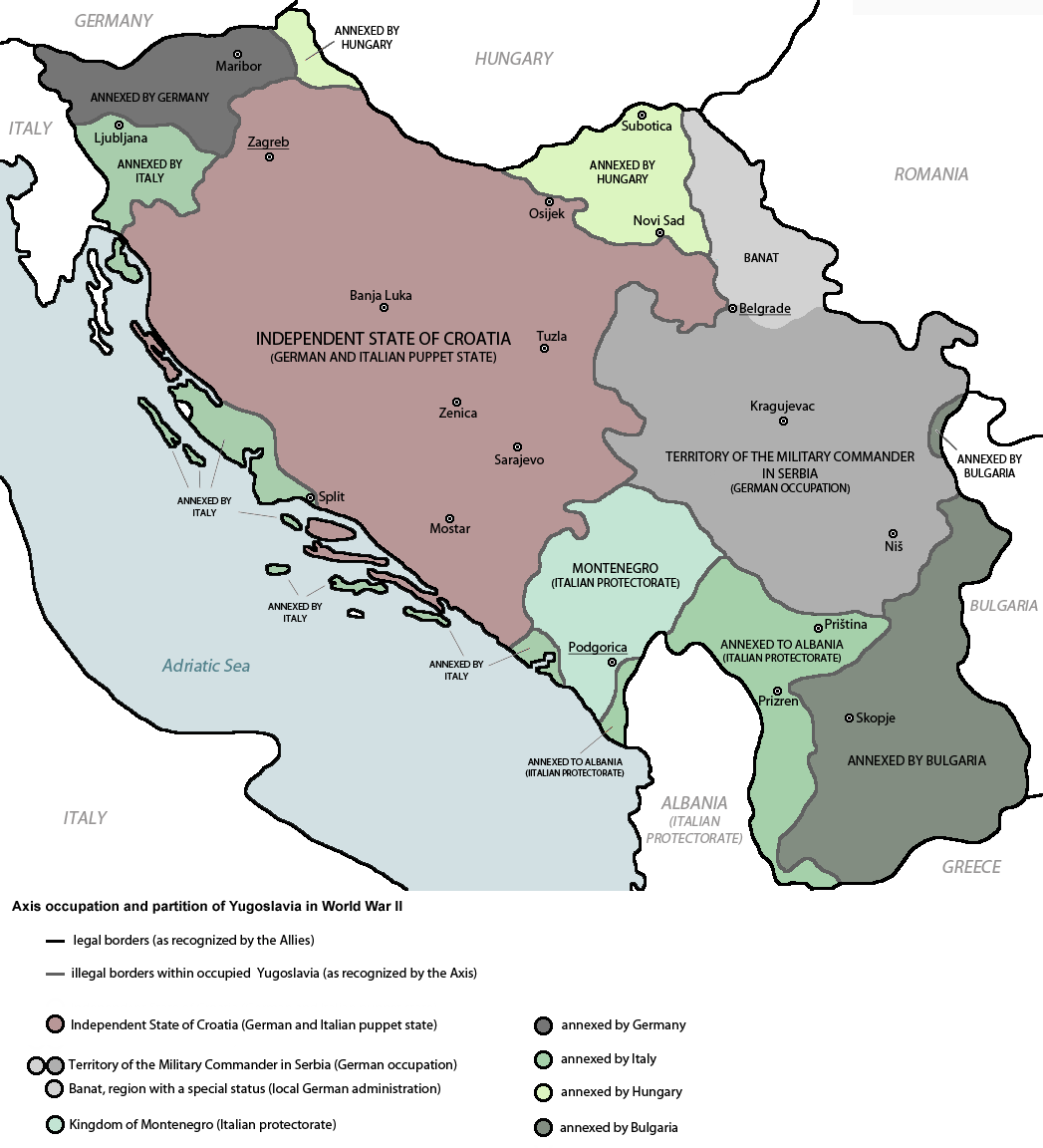
Partition of Yugoslavia in the New Order

Nazi Germany initially intended to concede the Eastern Mediterranean and the Balkans to the Italian sphere of influence, prioritizing the upcoming Nazi-Soviet War. However, following political upheaval in Yugoslavia, Hitler intervened directly, backing Croatian nationalists to partition the state and neutralize perceived Serbian Anglophilia. This intervention angered Mussolini, who viewed the Adriatic Sea as an exclusive Italian domain. To appease Italy, Germany facilitated Italian annexations in Slovenia, Dalmatia, and Montenegro. The crowning of Prince Aimone of the House of Savoy as the nominal king of the Independent State of Croatia seemingly confirmed Italian primacy over the Southern Slavic peoples. Additionally, Germany and Italy rewarded allied regional movements, granting territorial concessions to Albanian nationalists, Bulgaria, and Hungary.

Greece was similarly expected to fall under Italian protectorship. Axis plans involved partitioning the Hellenic State, transferring Chameria (Thesprotia) to Albania, and granting Vardar Macedonia and parts of Western Thrace to Bulgaria. Italy sought to annex the Ionian Islands, Crete, and the Sporades. Axis authorities planned forced population transfers and cultural assimilation campaigns to secure these new borders, while encouraging minority groups like the Pomaks and Aromanians to form localized client states (such as the Principality of Pindus). Additionally, SS officer Walter Blume proposed the "Chaos Thesis"—a policy of executing the Greek political elite to render the country leaderless and easily controlled—though diplomat Hermann Neubacher successfully opposed the measure, arguing that retaining an anti-communist leadership was necessary to manage partisan resistance.

Following the outbreak of the Italian Civil War and the Armistice of Cassibile, the Nazis moved to absorb the Italian sphere of influence into the German Reich. German plans involved reducing the Italian Social Republic to a puppet state and annexing strategic territories directly. The Operational Zone of the Adriatic Littoral (including Istria) was slated for annexation to the Reichsgau of Carinthia, while the Operational Zone of the Alpine Foothills was to join Reichsgau Tirol-Vorarlberg. In the long term, Nazi strategists envisioned conquering Northern Italy to restore historical German imperial borders, utilizing the ethnic complexity of the Adriatic region to promote segmentation and establish German cultural supremacy over the Balkans.

==== Establishment of German domination in Southeast Europe ====
Prior to the invasion of the Soviet Union, German hegemony in Southeast Europe was established through a network of client states (Slovakia, Hungary, Romania, Bulgaria, and Croatia) and direct military occupations in Serbia and Greece. To secure permanent control over the Danube basin, Hitler planned to establish fortified military bases in Thessaloniki and Belgrade (proposed to be renamed Prinz-Eugen-Stadt). In 1941, SS Brigade Chief Wilhelm Stuckart drafted a memorandum proposing the creation of a South German Buffer State, variously referred to as Prinz-Eugen-Gau or Reichsgau Banat comprising ethnic Germans from the Banat. This autonomous territory would ensure German supremacy over the regional economy and facilitate further resettlement of ethnic Germans.

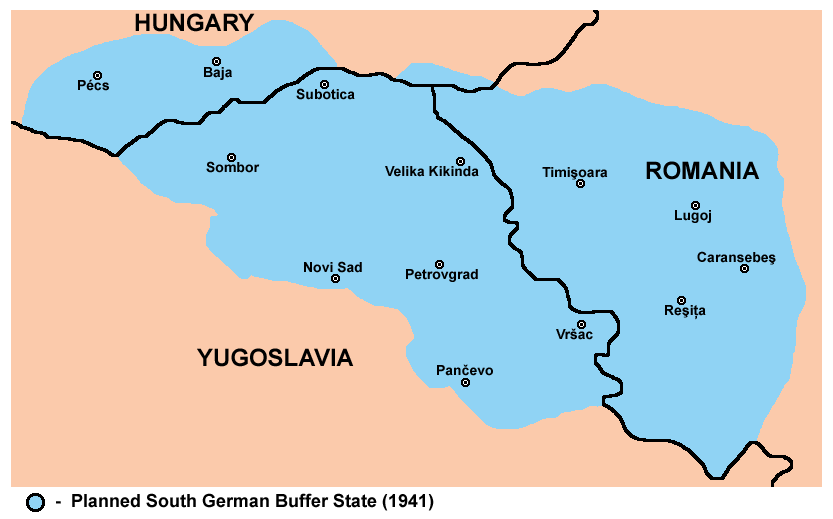
Planned German buffer state on the Danube that would be composed of ethnic Germans from the Banat

Even without direct annexation, the remaining Southeast European states would have operated as deeply dependent satellites within the German economic orbit, akin to World War I-era Mitteleuropa concepts. To solidify regional control, Hungarian fascist leader Ferenc Szálasi proposed a "Carpathian-Danubian federation," a system of con-nationalism designed to accommodate non-Hungarian minorities under a unified fascist framework to counter Yugoslav Partisans. Nazi officials considered supporting this federation, viewing it as a mechanism to exploit local ethnic conflicts, mediate disputes, and maintain a pliant buffer state against Soviet influence.

=== Establishment of a Greater Germanic Reich ===
Rough boundaries of the planned "Greater Germanic Reich," including possible satellites and protectorates: Greater Germanic Reich (With planned eastern expansions of Reichskommissariats) Satellite states totally dependent upon the Reich States dependent upon the Reich

One of the most elaborate Nazi projects initiated in the newly conquered territories during this period of the war was the planned establishment of a "Greater Germanic Reich of the German Nation" (Großgermanisches Reich Deutscher Nation). This future empire was to consist of, in addition to Greater Germany, virtually all of historically Germanic Europe (except Great Britain), whose inhabitants the Nazis believed to be "Aryan" in nature. The consolidation of these countries as mere provinces of the Third Reich, in the same manner in which Austria was reduced to the "Ostmark", was to be carried out through a rapidly enforced process of Gleichschaltung (synchronization). The ultimate intent of this was to eradicate all traces of national rather than racial consciousness, although their native languages were to remain in existence.

=== Conquest of Lebensraum in Eastern Europe ===
In Mein Kampf, Adolf Hitler argued that Germany required Lebensraum (living space) in the East to nurture future generations, describing this as a "historic destiny." He claimed the Russian state was forged not by Slavic political ability, but by "the state-forming efficacity of the German element in an inferior race." On 3 February 1933, Hitler told army staff that Germany's problems required "the conquest of new living space in the east and its ruthless Germanization."

Implementation of the New Order began on June 22, 1941, with Operation Barbarossa, the invasion of the Soviet Union. The campaign aimed to destroy the Soviet regime and racially reorganize European Russia, as outlined in the Generalplan Ost. Alfred Rosenberg was appointed Minister for the Occupied Eastern Territories, while SS head Heinrich Himmler was tasked with implementing the plan, which mandated the enslavement, expulsion, and extermination of Baltic and Slavic peoples. Furthermore, Hitler sought to establish a blockade-proof autarky by exploiting Soviet resources, including Ukrainian grain and minerals, Crimean agricultural products, and Caucasian crude oil.

By 1942, the General Government in Poland, Reichskommissariat Ostland in the Baltic states and Belarus, and Reichskommissariat Ukraine were established. Three additional administrative divisions were planned: Reichskommissariat Moskowien (European Russia), Reichskommissariat Kaukasien (the Caucasus), and Reichskommissariat Turkestan (Soviet Central Asia). This territorial expansion coincided with the annihilation of the Jewish population and the planned enslavement of Slavic inhabitants, who were intended to labor on estates granted to SS "soldier peasants." German leadership, however, was divided on occupation policies. Rosenberg's ministry favored a pragmatic approach, proposing limited local autonomy and decollectivization to leverage anti-Soviet sentiment. Conversely, Himmler's SS advocated for immediate, brutal subjugation, viewing the local populations strictly as objects of exploitation.

To populate the acquired Eastern territories, the Lebensborn program was expanded and the Cross of Honor of the German Mother was instituted to reward women who bore at least eight children. Martin Bormann and Himmler also considered marriage legislation allowing decorated war heroes to take additional wives, with Himmler envisioning a German population of 300 million by the year 2000.

==== Plans for Belarus, Russia, and Ukraine ====
Rosenberg sought to eliminate the Russian state to permanently neutralize "Greater Russiandom" (Großrussentum) and pan-Slavism. To achieve this, Nazi officials proposed exploiting ethnic divisions through divide and conquer strategies. In March 1942, anthropologist Otto Reche advocated replacing the concept of Russia with medieval Slavic ethnicities like the Vyatichs and Severians. This was to be solved by exploiting ethnic centrifugal forces and limiting the influence of "Greater Russiandom" (Großrussentum) by promoting segmentation in the manner of divide and conquer.

Rosenberg perceived Belarusians as the "least dangerous" Eastern people, intending to use Belarus as a dumping ground for undesirable demographics and eventually convert the territory into a nature reserve. In 1940, Himmler similarly proposed splintering Eastern European populations into localized ethnic groups (such as Gorals, Lemkos, and Kashubians) while assimilating any "racially valuable" individuals into Germany. In April 1942, Erhard Wetzel of the NSDAP Office of Racial Policy detailed plans to divide Reichskommissariat Moskowien into loosely tied districts to undermine Russian national cohesion. Additionally, Himmler considered exporting the Jehovah's Witnesses faith to the occupied East, believing their pacifism would foster submissiveness, despite the ongoing persecution of the group within Germany.

Nazi leadership also discussed replacing the Cyrillic script with the German alphabet and giving Russian cities Germanized names (e.g., renaming Novgorod to Holmgard). In 1942, the Interior Ministry issued semantic guidelines aimed at erasing Russian imperial identity. The term "Russia" was restricted to the pre-1917 Russian Empire, while the subsequent Soviet period was labeled "Bolshevik chaos." Historical terms like Little Russia (Ukraine) and Russian Asia (Siberia) were banned as expressions of "Muscovite imperialism." Similarly, the term "Tatars" was replaced with specific regional identifiers like "Idel-Uralian" and "Azerbaijanis" to diminish broader Russian linguistic influence.

==== Plans for Baltic Region ====
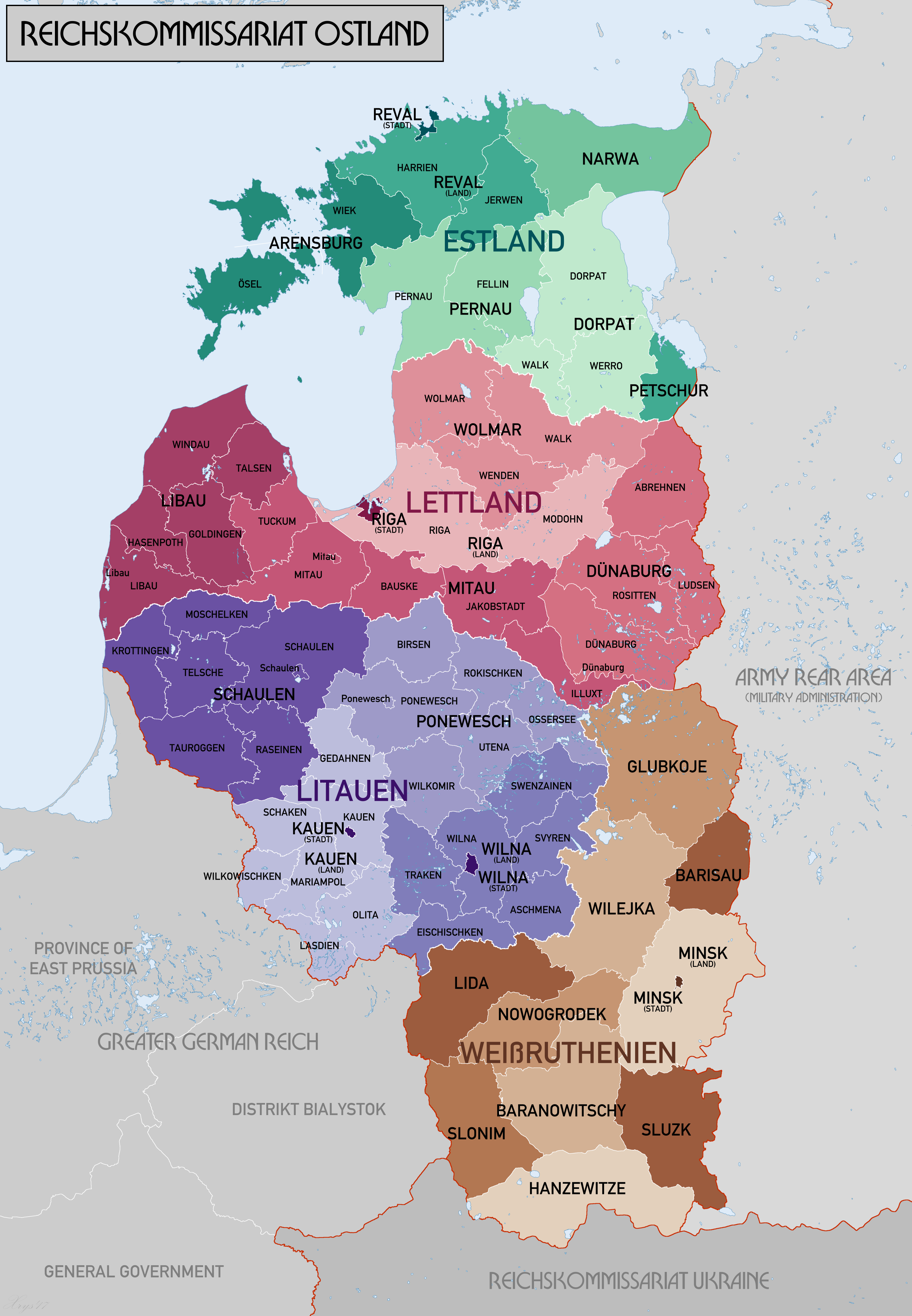
Administration of Reichskommissariat Ostland

Nazi anthropologists viewed the Baltic peoples (Estonians, Latvians, and Lithuanians) as largely assimilable. The long-term goal was their Germanization, inspired by the historical Ostsiedlung, with the region ultimately incorporated into the Greater Germanic Reich. Initially, the territory was to be named Reichskommissariat Baltenland, but the inclusion of West Belarus led to the adoption of Reichskommissariat Ostland to avoid signaling impending autonomy to local nationalists. During the occupation, German authorities initially tolerated but subsequently suppressed nationalist groups like the Lithuanian Activist Front and the Latvian diplomatic service. The region was divided into four Generalbezirke ruled by German civil administrators, who actively repressed both Soviet partisans and Baltic independence movements.

==== Plans for the Caucasus ====
Conquering the Caucasus was a priority due to its vital oil reserves (particularly in Baku) and its strategic value for projecting power into the Greater Middle East and linking with the Japanese Empire. To secure the region, Germany was willing to offer concessions to anti-Russian populations, such as the Chechens and Azerbaijanis. These concessions included potential autonomous units within the Reichskommissariat Kaukasien or the establishment of client states to avoid antagonizing neighboring Turkey and Iran. German leadership made vague promises to Armenian nationalists regarding a restored Greater Armenia to counter Russian resistance. However, Hitler distrusted the Armenians and preferred an alliance with Kemalist Turkey. Following the Battle of Stalingrad, Armenian support for the Axis waned, and German plans relegated Armenia to minor administrative districts. Fascist Italy sought to establish a restored Georgian Monarchy as an Italian protectorate to project power into the Black Sea. Nazi Germany permitted Georgian representation in its administrative cabinets. While Hitler considered granting Pahlavi Iran administrative control over the region (retaining German military and economic rights to Baku's oil), most Nazi leaders sought direct annexation. Proposals for a National Committee of Azerbaijan were largely rejected until 1945, when a nominal state was recognized to mobilize the Ostlegionen against the Soviets.

=== Re-settlement efforts ===
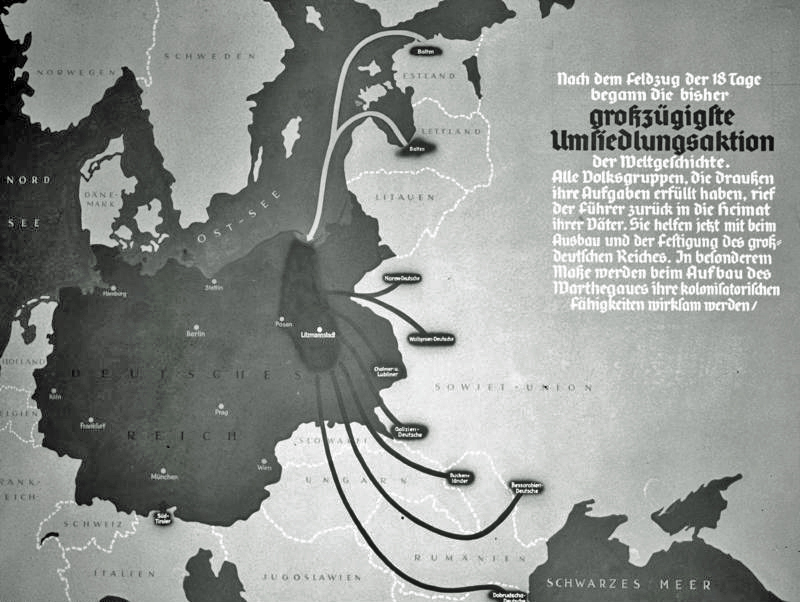
A German map produced after the defeat of Poland in 1939 calling for German-descendant settlers in eastern Europe to return to the Warthegau

By 1942, Germany had acquired its desired Lebensraum, but these annexed territories lacked populations that met Nazi racial principles. Hitler intended to populate these lands through a "reordering of ethnographical relations" before the war's end. The project began on 7 October 1939, when Hitler appointed Heinrich Himmler as the Reich Commissar for the Consolidation of Germandom (Reichskommissar für die Festigung deutschen Volkstums, or RKFDV). This position authorized Himmler to repatriate ethnic Germans (Volksdeutsche) to occupied Poland and other territories slated for Germanization. To make room for these settlers, hundreds of thousands of Polish and French citizens were expelled from their lands.

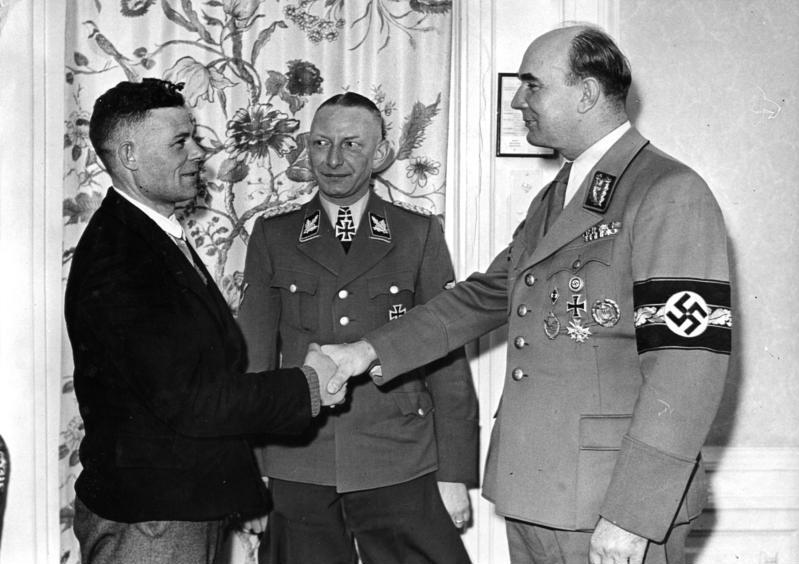
Gauleiter Arthur Greiser greeting the millionth German resettler of Reichsgau Wartheland, 1944

By the end of 1942, 629,000 Volksdeutsche had been resettled, with preparations underway to transfer an additional 393,000. The Hauptamt Volksdeutsche Mittelstelle (VoMi) planned to resettle a further 5.4 million Volksdeutsche, primarily from Transylvania, the Banat, France, Hungary, and Romania. These immigrants were classified into three categories: "high quality" (settled in the annexed eastern territories), racially or politically unreliable (settled in the Altreich), or those suitable only for transit camps. Himmler faced resistance from ethnic Germans in France and Luxembourg, many of whom preferred to retain their existing citizenship. Germany also sought assistance from non-German Germanic peoples, including Danish, Swedish, Norwegian, Dutch, and British collaborators. For example, the Dutch East Company (Nederlandsche Oost-Compagnie) facilitated the transfer of Dutch settlers to Pskov to support the eastern colonization efforts.

Settlement/resettlement figures on 1 June 1944
Territory of origin	Total	Resettled in annexed eastern territories
Estonia and Latvia	76,895	57,249
Lithuania	51,076	30,315
Volhynia, Galicia, Narew	136,958	109,482
Eastern Government-General	32,960	25,956
Bessarabia	93,342	89,201
Northern Bukovina	43,670	24,203
Southern Bukovina	52,149	40,804
Dobruja	15,454	11,812
Romania, Regat	10,115	1,129
Gottschee and Ljubljana	15,008	13,143
Bulgaria	1,945	226
Residual Serbia	2,900	350
Russia	350,000	177,146
Greece	250	
Bosnia	18,437	3,698
Slovakia	98	
South Tyrol	88,630	Reich, Protectorate, Luxembourg: 68,162
France	19,226	Alsace, Lorraine, Luxembourg, Reich, Protectorate: 9,572
Total	1,009,113	662,448

== Plans outside Europe ==
Fascist Italy and Nazi Germany had two means of operations to extend their sphere of influence outside Europe, consisting intergovernmental diplomacy from the Foreign Ministries of each country with their consulates, while also developing propaganda and subversion through unofficial agencies linked to Axis Powers, like the Fascist League of North America or the Ausland-Organization (foreign organisations) branch of the Nazi Party, serving to establish the political and economic hegemony of the Axis Powers in selected countries, using them to expand Axis Powers influence through their continents.

=== Plans for Africa ===
Hitler considered Africa secondary to his expansionist aims in Europe. His pre-war demands for the return of Germany's former colonies served primarily as bargaining chips for European territorial goals. While he expected Africa to eventually fall under German control, Hitler remained largely indifferent to African colonialism. He opposed it as a distraction from his primary socio-economic goal of achieving Lebensraum in Eastern Europe (Drang nach Osten). He favored a continentalist approach, criticizing the thalassocratic ambitions of Wilhelmine Germany and the British Empire.

To prevent an Anglo-German agreement at the expense of the French Empire, Vichy France proposed closer political ties with the Reich. Anticipating an intercontinental conflict between the Axis and the United States, Vichy leaders, including François Darlan, offered to use their African empire and colonial fleet to protect Nazi-occupied Europe. This included offering extraterritorial air and naval bases to Germany in Dakar, Bizerte, and Aleppo under the Paris Protocols (1941). However, Hitler's distrust of France precluded any long-term, equal partnership, as he intended France to be relegated to a minor colonial power in the New Order.

==== Plans for the establishment of an African colonial dominion ====
Hitler intended to divide Africa into three broad regions: the northern third would be assigned to Italy, the central part would fall under German rule (restoring the Mittelafrika project), and the southern sector would be controlled by a pro-Nazi Afrikaner state. In a 1933 meeting with Heinrich Schnee, president of the German Colonial Society, Hitler expressed support for Germans in former colonies like Togoland and Kamerun.

"As for our overseas colonies, we have by no means abandoned colonial aspirations... There are many things that Germany must get from the colonies, and we need colonies as much as any other country."

— Adolf Hitler, Sunday Express, January 30, 1933

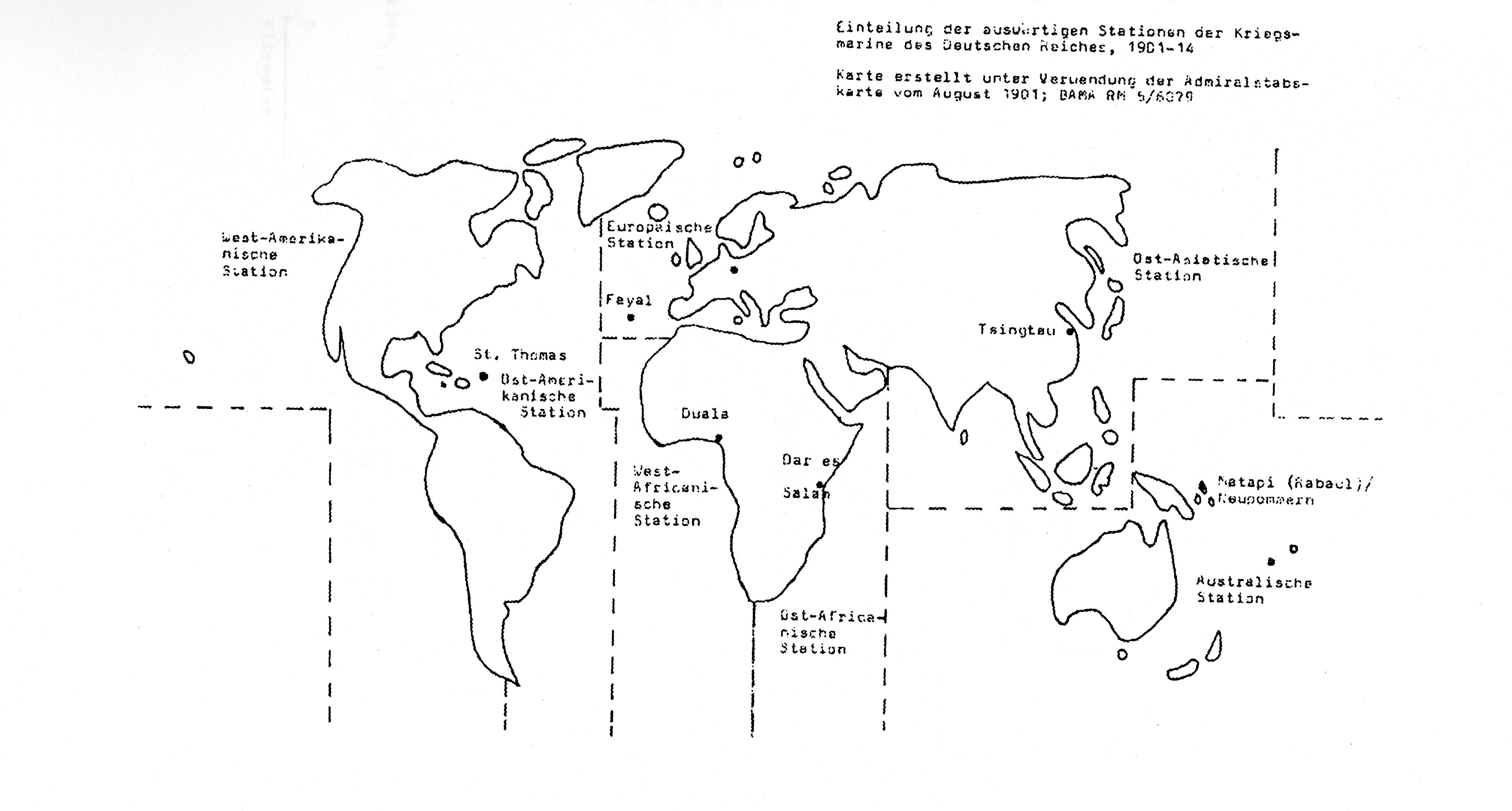
Map of the foreign stations of the Imperial German Navy around the world in 1901–1914 (with its areas of operations). Nazi Germany wanted the restoration of that global system, so colonial policy was a pragmatic necessity in the New Order.

Nazi Germany sought to regain its former colonies to satisfy nationalist demands, gain international prestige, and secure economic resources. Beginning in 1935, the return of these colonies became a frequent topic of negotiation with the British government. In 1938, British Prime Minister Neville Chamberlain offered a redistribution of Central Africa under an international administration, which Hitler rejected, insisting on the direct return of Germany's original colonies without compensation. To prepare for anticipated colonial acquisitions, the NSDAP Office of Colonial Policy (KPA) opened a training center in 1938 to educate future colonial administrators. In 1939, Hitler commissioned Franz Ritter von Epp to re-establish the Reich Colonial Office. Further institutions, such as a Colonial Police Office and a Technical School of Foreign Trade, were established between 1941 and 1942 to prepare for the management of the African territories.

Concerning the partition of the African colonies from the Allied Powers that were defeated on the Fall of France, it was expected that it would be a territory bigger than the former German colonial empire. In that ideal, Franz Halder told directly to Hitler himself (on July 13, 1940) that: "The French and Belgian Congo will be claimed for us." Also, when a fast victory against British Empire was a possibility, Joachim von Ribbentrop traveled to Italy in September 1940 with the mission to start negotiations about the division of Africa after a victorious end to the war against Great Britain. According to those conversations, it was agreed that all of Central and Southern Africa would go to the German sphere of influence, while West and North Africa went to Italy's, with the exception of Greater Morocco, which was considered for Francoist Spain or to be restored as an independent nation to serve as a buffer state.

==== Plans for North Africa ====
Nazi Germany conceded primacy in North and East Africa to Italy to fulfill Mussolini's imperial ambitions, allowing for a contiguous empire from Tunisia to Greater Somalia. The Italian Foreign Ministry envisioned establishing an independent Egypt under Italian influence and a joint Italian-Egyptian condominium over the Sinai Peninsula and Anglo-Egyptian Sudan. This aimed to appease Arab nationalists and position Italy as the "Protector of Islam." The "New Order" also planned to impose strict racial segregation across Italian colonies, forbidding interracial relationships to preserve "racial prestige." Regarding French African colonies, Hitler refused to make official promises to Spain or Italy during the war to avoid alienating Vichy France. However, at the Meeting at Hendaye, Hitler secretly promised Francisco Franco territories in French West Africa if Spain entered the war. Hitler remained ambiguous to prevent angering Mussolini or Pétain, while secretly harboring ambitions to seize Equatorial Guinea and the Canary Islands for Germany. Ultimately, Axis plans for North Africa prioritized strategic German and Italian interests over the emancipation of local populations.

==== Plans for Central Africa ====
In 1940, the Kriegsmarine produced a detailed plan for a German colonial empire in sub-Saharan Africa, extending from the Atlantic Ocean to the Indian Ocean. This proposed domain would fulfill the territorial goal of Mittelafrika, providing a base for German pre-eminence on the continent. Unlike Eastern Europe, these areas were not intended for extensive German settlement; rather, they were to be economically exploited for natural resources and labor. Under the "Reich Colonial Law" of 1940, these territories would be economically integrated into the Reich. Strict racial segregation was to be enforced, classifying the population into "Germans" (citizens), "Natives" (wards of the state), and "Strangers." Nazi plans included a paternalistic approach to keep African populations under strict state control while exploiting their workforce. The proposed territory included all pre-1914 German colonies, alongside substantial portions of French, Belgian, and British holdings, such as the French Congo, Belgian Congo, Nigeria, Gold Coast, and Zanzibar. The plan also envisioned a string of fortified naval and air bases spanning the Atlantic coastline from Norway to the Belgian Congo.

==== Plans for Southern Africa ====
Prior to the war, Nazi organizations had established a strong presence among German Namibians in South West Africa, prompting the South African government to ban them in 1934. Following a hypothetical victory over the United Kingdom, the Nazis hoped to establish a pro-Axis Afrikaner government in the Union of South Africa. In early 1940, Foreign Minister Ribbentrop communicated with sympathetic South African leaders, informing them that Germany intended to reclaim German South West Africa. In exchange, South Africa was to be compensated with the British protectorates of Swaziland, Basutoland, and Bechuanaland, as well as the colony of Southern Rhodesia.

=== Plans for Asia and the Pacific ===
==== Division of Asia between the Axis powers ====
During the early stages of World War II, Joachim von Ribbentrop and Friedrich-Werner Graf von der Schulenburg promoted the German–Soviet Axis talks to temporarily include the Soviet Union in the Axis powers. This proposed Eurasian Kontinentalblock aimed to dismantle the global dominance of the British Empire and the United States. By diverting Soviet ambitions toward the Middle East and the Indian subcontinent, Germany hoped to distract Joseph Stalin from European affairs, avoid a two-front war, and secure the Western Front. Japanese Foreign Minister Yōsuke Matsuoka supported dividing the world into four continental blocs led by Nazi Germany, Imperial Japan, the United States, and the Soviet Union. However, conflicting interests quickly emerged. Soviet-Japanese border disputes in Asia, alongside Soviet-German disagreements over Turkey and control of the Bosporus Straits, ultimately frustrated Hitler. These tensions led to the launch of Operation Barbarossa and the exclusion of the Soviets from the New Order.

"After the conquest of England, the British Empire would be apportioned as a gigantic world-wide estate in bankruptcy of forty million square kilometres. In this bankrupt estate there would be for Russia access to the ice-free and really open ocean. Thus far, a minority of forty-five million Englishmen had ruled six hundred million inhabitants of the British Empire. He was about to crush this minority.... Under these circumstances there arose world-wide perspectives.... All the countries which could possibly be interested in the bankrupt estate would have to stop all controversies among themselves and concern themselves exclusively with the partition of the British Empire. This applied to Germany, France, Italy, Russia and Japan."

— Adolf Hitler

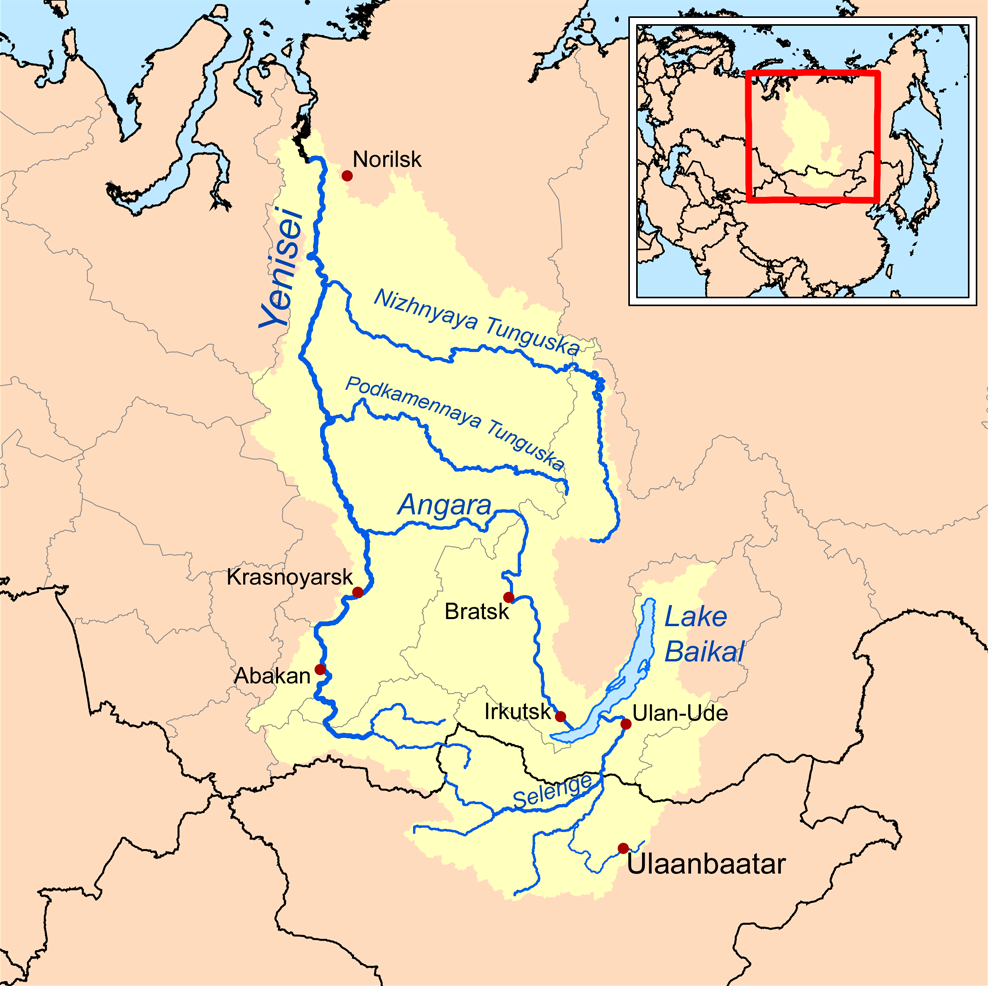
The Yenisei River in Siberia was the agreed division point of Eurasia between Nazi Germany and Imperial Japan.

In 1942, Nazi Germany and Imperial Japan held a secret diplomatic conference to divide Asia along the Yenisey River, extending to the borders of China, the Soviet Union, Afghanistan, and British India. Although the German Foreign Office and the Kriegsmarine rejected ambassador Hiroshi Ōshima's initial draft because it allocated India to Japan and limited naval operations in the Indian Ocean, Hitler found it acceptable and signed the treaty on 18 January 1942. This rigid demarcation proved detrimental to Axis strategic cooperation; crossing the boundary line required tedious prior consultation, making joint offensives against British positions in the Middle East impossible. Japanese operations against Allied shipping lines during the Indian Ocean raid had been highly successful along with the attack against Ceylon, but these were not followed due to the non-existent German-Japanese strategic cooperation. The Germans vigorously maintained watch on the demarcation line and objected to any Japanese incursion to the "German sphere" of the Axis-divided world. Thus the Japanese were forced to cancel a planned massive attack against Madagascar, as the island had been delegated to Germany in the treaty.

==== Concession of Oceania to Japan ====
Germany intended to temporarily sell its former Pacific colonies (German New Guinea and German Samoa) to Japan to strengthen the Tripartite Pact. Initial plans to re-annex German Samoa through the Samoan branch of the Nazi Party were rejected by the Nazi leadership, as the branch relied heavily on mixed-race settlers rather than white Germans. Nazi Germany also briefly asserted claims over the uninhabited British Henderson Island during the German attacks on Nauru, causing minor diplomatic friction with Japan. Regarding Australia and New Zealand, Hitler and Joseph Goebbels believed these territories would soon be colonized by Japan, showing no interest in retaining them for Germany.

Concerning the other Europeans territories in Oceania, like Australia and New Zealand were designated as future Japanese territories, although Hitler lamented his belief that the Aryan race would disappear from those regions. He nevertheless made it clear to his officials that "the descendants of the convicts in Australia" were not Germany's concern and that their lands would be colonised by Japanese settlers in the immediate future, an opinion also shared by Joseph Goebbels, who expressed his conviction in his diary that the Japanese had always desired "the fifth continent" for emigration purposes. Hitler loathed New Zealanders as a "lower form of human being". At a speech given on 15 July 1925 – his only recorded lengthy discussion on New Zealand – he argued that New Zealanders lived in trees and "clambered around on all fours" having not yet learned to walk upright. The speech was later reprinted as a pamphlet. Historian Norman Rich stated that it can be assumed that Hitler would have attempted to recruit the Anglo-Saxons of these two countries as colonists for the conquered east; some of the English were to share the same fate.

==== Plans for the Far East ====
Nazi Germany's Far East policy initially favored the Republic of China as a strategic partner against the Soviet Union. German military and economic support, facilitated by figures like Hans von Seeckt and Alexander von Falkenhausen, continued during the early Nazi era. However, following the outbreak of the Second Sino-Japanese War and the formation of the Second United Front between Chinese Nationalists and Communists, German leadership felt betrayed. Championed by Joachim von Ribbentrop, Germany shifted its allegiance to the Empire of Japan, culminating in the Tripartite Pact. This agreement conceded East Asia and Southeast Asia to the Japanese Greater East Asia Co-Prosperity Sphere, prioritizing a militarily and economically superior ally over previous colonial ambitions.

==== Plans for Tibet and Indosphere ====
German interest in Tibet was largely driven by the 1938–1939 German expedition to Tibet, led by Ernst Schäfer. The proposed Operation Tibet aimed to instigate anti-British rebellions in the region following a hypothetical Axis victory in the Soviet Union. Similarly, the 1939 Japanese expedition to Tibet sought to draw the 14th Dalai Lama into Japan's sphere of influence to establish a Pan-Buddhist alliance against Western and Soviet powers. Both Axis nations ultimately failed to establish a strong foothold in the region.

==== Plans for the Indian Subcontinent ====
Hitler held disparaging views of the Indian independence movement, considering Indians racially inferior to the British. During the early stages of the war, he favored maintaining British control over the Indian subcontinent to prevent a Soviet takeover. Following the invasion of the Soviet Union, the German High Command drafted contingency plans to threaten British India through Afghanistan, primarily to force British capitulation. Although Indian nationalist Subhas Chandra Bose sought Axis support for an Indian government-in-exile, Hitler remained skeptical of India's readiness for rebellion. Ultimately, in 1942, the Axis powers agreed to divide the subcontinent, allocating the western portion to Germany and the remainder to Japan. Although India wasn't considered in the early designs for the Greater East Asia Co-Prosperity Sphere in 1940, the Japanese developed plans based in pan-Asianists experts in Indology like Okawa Shumei, who argued that India was the "source" of Asian spirituality and Metaphysics which made Asia distinctively Asian (giving their systems of logic and epistemology in opposition to Western philosophy), so Japan was to be the "shield" of such Orientalist spiritual order against the Abrahamic world. This great steem to India was complemented in the fact that the historical inspiration for Japanese artistic expressions was traced to India's spiritual ideals as the birthplace of The Buddha, which was enough fundament to believe in a debt of the Japanese people to the Indic civilisation (which was viewed with a level of respect not afforded to Western nations). Therefore, in the Greater East Asia Joint Declaration of 1943, India (represented by Bose's provisional government) was treated as an independent ally, not a subordinate puppet state like Manchukuo, and so was expected to be a friendly and independent partner in the New Order, not a colonial subject of the Japanese Empire (which would end in the Indo-Burma border), but an Empire of its own in the Greater India, with an equal status and under a strategic alliance based in Buddhist kingship (although still Japan having a preeminence, wanting to have a relationship with India like the one between Italy and Germany). In the long term such Indo-Japanese alliance would expel the British from their remnants colonies in Asia by cutting off the British naval supremacy in the Western Indian Ocean and meeting up with Italo-Germans in the Middle East (with the potential help of Arab nationalists and Pahlavi Iran) to finally crush Western imperialism in Asia after the hypothetical success of the Kuroshima Western Strategy and Nazi Operation Orient.

==== Plans for the Islamic World ====
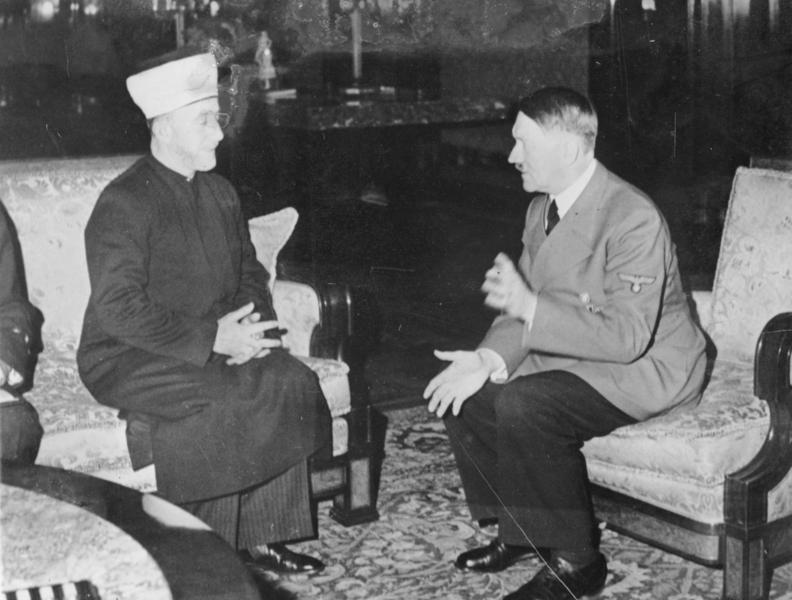
Amin al-Husseini, the Grand Mufti of Jerusalem, and Adolf Hitler, 28 November 1941

Axis plans for the Islamic world aimed to foment uprisings across North Africa and the Middle East to undermine British and French influence. Nazi Germany supported Arab nationalism, aligning with figures like Amin al-Husseini, the Grand Mufti of Jerusalem, to counter Allied forces and advance the Final Solution in the region. Fascist Italy sought a dominant sphere of influence in the Eastern Mediterranean, proposing protectorates over Syria, Lebanon, and Egypt. In the Persian sphere, Nazi Germany envisioned a modernized, independent Iran serving as a bulwark against Soviet and British interests. Operations were also planned to instigate Pashtun rebellions among the 15 million ethnic Pashtuns in Afghanistan and the Tribal Areas to threaten British India, though these efforts yielded minimal success.

The Turks can achieve independence only with the assistance of the Axis countries, and therefore turkestanis consider themselves their soldiers and are ready to fulfill any task.

— K. Rasmus

=== Plans for the Americas ===
==== Plans for North America ====
Before securing control of Europe, the Nazi leadership aimed to keep the United States out of the war. In a 1941 interview with Life, Hitler dismissed a German invasion of the Western Hemisphere as "fantastic" as an invasion of the moon. U.S. pro-Nazi movements, such as the German American Bund, played no role in Hitler's plans and received no German support after 1935.

However, Nazi propagandists attempted to exploit domestic tensions by circulating fictitious reports that Berlin recognized Native Americans, such as the Sioux, as "Aryans." Inspired in part by Hitler's fondness for Karl May's Western novels, the Nazis hoped to incite an uprising among Native Americans to undermine the Roosevelt administration, though these propaganda efforts yielded no practical results.

Aware of the Nazi threat, U.S. President Franklin D. Roosevelt explicitly condemned the "New Order" in a March 1941 speech, describing it as a system "imposed by conquest, and based on slavery." Hitler held U.S. society in contempt, stating that the United States (which he consistently referred to as the "American Union") was "half Judaised, and the other half Negrified". He further dismissed it as racially impure, and had outlined the inevitability of a future German-American conflict for global hegemony in his 1928 unpublished Zweites Buch. Anticipating this "battle of the continents," Hitler planned a massive expansion of the Kriegsmarine under Plan Z to project power across the Atlantic. He also considered occupying the Azores, Cape Verde, Madeira, and the Canary Islands to secure naval and air bases, which would serve as staging grounds for the Amerikabomber project to strike North American cities. Historian Gerhard L. Weinberg stated that this super-fleet was intended against the Western Hemisphere.

The actual physical conquest of the United States was unlikely, however, and the future disposition of U.S. territories remained cloudy in Hitler's mind. He perceived the anticipated battle with that country, at least under his own rule, to be a sort of "battle of the continents"—possibly along the lines of then-contemporary U.S. thought, such as the opening text from the second film in Frank Capra's Why We Fight series, illustrating one U.S. viewpoint of what Hitler could have thought on such matters while viewing the crowds at the 1934 Nuremberg rally—with a Nazi-dominated Old World fighting for global dominance against the New World, in which Germany would attain leadership of the world rather than establish direct control over it. Further decisions down the line were left up to future generations of German rulers.

Canada featured minimally in Nazi geopolitical planning. Hitler grouped Canada with the United States, viewing both as materialistic and decadent, and expected the U.S. to annex Canada following the anticipated collapse of the British Empire. Consequently, Nazi policy toward Canada was largely improvised. However, Vichy France sought to establish a sphere of influence among Franco-Canadians in Quebec by promoting the Révolution nationale. While the Catholic Church and the broader Quebécois public largely rejected these overtures, a fringe of Franco-Canadian fascist secret societies maintained minor contacts with Vichy France and Nazi Germany, hoping for Axis support to achieve an independent Quebec.

==== Plans for Central America and Caribbean ====
Axis plans for Central America and the Caribbean were largely unformulated. While both Germany (via Operation Pelikan) and Japan recognized the strategic value of the Panama Canal, neither developed comprehensive administrative policies for the region. Japan harbored preliminary ambitions to establish a "Government-General of Central America" to dismantle the Monroe Doctrine and control the Pacific Rim, while anticipating that the Caribbean would fall to Italian or German colonialism. Taking advantage of German indifference toward Latin America, Francoist Spain sought to revive its historical influence in Spanish America through the Servicio Exterior de Falange. The U.S. State Department viewed this pan-Hispanic outreach—which found some sympathy among right-wing factions in Mexico and Argentina—as a proxy effort by the Axis powers to challenge American hegemony in the Western Hemisphere.

==== Plans for the economic domination of South America ====
While Fascist Italy sought to cultivate a "Latin Axis" in South America by appealing to shared cultural heritage and the large Italian diaspora, Hitler and the Nazi leadership showed little interest in the continent outside of economic exploitation and warnings against "racial mixing."

Between 1933 and 1941, Germany's primary geopolitical goal in South America—particularly in the ABC countries (Argentina, Brazil, and Chile)—was to expand trade at the expense of the Western Powers, anticipating that a German-dominated Europe would eventually displace the United States as the continent's principal trading partner.

To support its economic aims, the Reich attempted to mobilize German immigrant communities in South America, operating espionage networks and supporting local fascist movements such as the Integralists and the National Socialist Movement of Chile. Rumors of Axis-backed coups were widespread. In October 1941, U.S. President Roosevelt publicly claimed to possess a secret German map dividing South America into five Nazi-dominated vassal states; this map was later revealed to be a forgery produced by British Security Coordination to sway U.S. public opinion. Similarly, the Argentine and Chilean governments investigated alleged Nazi plots to annex Patagonia and orchestrate paramilitary uprisings, though many of these claims were fueled by wartime hysteria or fabricated by Allied intelligence. While long-term territorial designs on South America remained speculative, Nazi Germany actively invested in covert operations, including Operation Bolívar, to secure its intelligence and economic footholds.

=== Plans for Antarctica ===
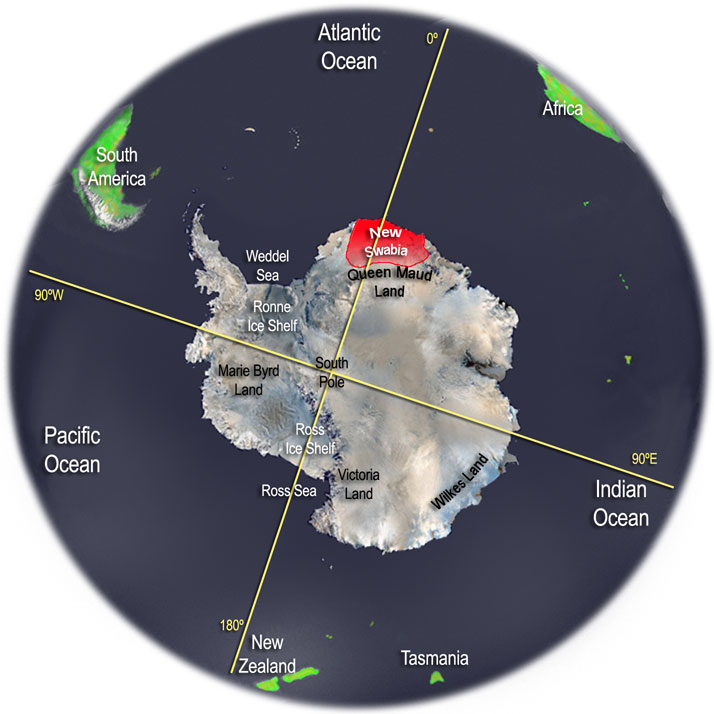
Map of the projected German Antarctic colonial domain of New Swabia

Nazi Germany planned to establish a colonial domain named New Swabia in Antarctica, situated between 20°W and 20°E in modern Queen Maud Land. This ambition prompted Norway to formally annex the territory five days before the first German expedition arrived on the MS Schwabenland. Subsequent expeditions planned for the Pacific sector were canceled upon the outbreak of World War II.

The primary economic goal was to establish whaling stations to extract whale oil, reducing Germany's reliance on Foreign exchange reserves for importing dietary and industrial fats. In the long term, German occupation of the territory was intended to rival the global reach of Britain, France, and the United States.

== Plans for future wars against Asia ==
Although Nazi Germany allied with Imperial Japan against the Western Allies and the Soviet Union based on Realpolitik, the Nazi leadership viewed this alliance as strictly temporary. Nazi racial ideology categorized the Japanese as "culture-bearers" rather than "culture-creators," and viewed the populous Asian continent as the ultimate threat to white hegemony. Historian Gerhard L. Weinberg notes that Hitler employed a tactic of conceding to Japanese demands in the short term, fully intending to defeat them in a subsequent war. In early 1942, Hitler told Ribbentrop that a future "showdown between the white and the yellow races" was inevitable. Anticipating this future conflict, the Oberkommando der Marine included the possibility of war with Japan in its post-Barbarossa military planning as early as July 1941. In 1942, NSDAP official Erhard Wetzel warned that an independent India and a Greater Asia under Japanese influence would pose a massive demographic threat to a German-controlled Europe. While Hitler welcomed Japan's entry into the war as a strategic counterweight to the United States, he lamented the prospect of the white race disappearing from European colonies in Oceania. Ultimately, the Nazi leadership envisioned that a victorious, expanded Germanic Europe would eventually have to fight a "vital struggle against Asia" to determine the fate of human civilization, a sentiment explicitly detailed by Heinrich Himmler during his 1943 Posen speeches.

== Cancellation of the New Order project ==
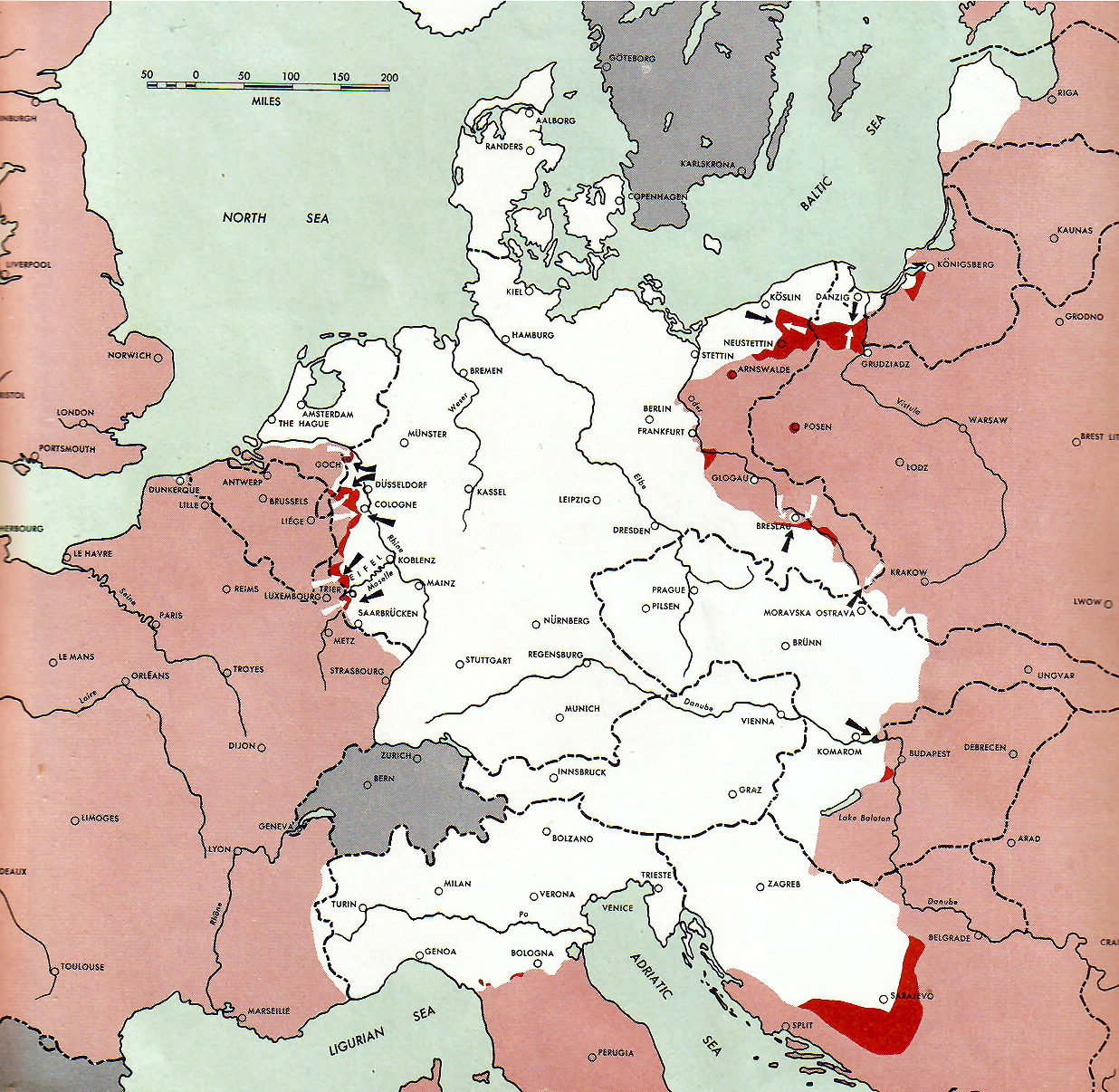
Areas still under German control in March 1945

Following the decisive defeat at the Battle of Stalingrad in February 1943 and the failure of the 1943 summer offensive, Germany was forced onto the defensive. Unable to mount large-scale counterattacks on the Eastern Front, the active territorial implementation of the New Order in the Soviet Union was halted, although the genocidal campaigns against Jews, Romani, and other minorities continued relentlessly.

By October 1943, Hitler privately suggested to Joseph Goebbels that Germany should seek a temporary armistice with the Soviet Union, returning to the 1941 borders. He theorized this would allow Germany to defeat the Western Allies before resuming a war for Lebensraum in the east—a task he believed he would have to leave to his successor. Even late in the war, during the Ardennes offensive and the Allied crossing of the Rhine, Hitler clung to the delusion that a localized victory might salvage the regime and allow for a division of Poland with the Soviets. He only acknowledged Germany's total defeat mere days before his suicide.

== See also ==
- Areas annexed by Nazi Germany
- Greater Germanic Reich, the dominion which the Nazis attempted to create by merging all of the Germanic countries in Europe into one state.
- Greater East Asia Co-Prosperity Sphere, the envisioned Japanese economic equivalent of the New Order and the Greater Germanic Reich
- Jewish settlement in the Japanese Empire
- The Ural Mountains in Nazi planning
- Wehrbauer
- Italian imperialism under fascism, the Fascist Italian project for securing domination of the Mediterranean area.
- Axis power negotiations on the division of Asia during World War II
- Grossdeutschland
- Drang nach Osten ("The Drive Eastward")
- Lebensborn
- Lebensraum
- Final solution
- Generalplan Ost
- The Holocaust
- Romani Holocaust
- Hunger Plan
- European theater of World War II
- German-occupied Europe
- Nazi eugenics
- Nazi racial theories
- Pan-Germanism
- Racial policy of Nazi Germany
- Consequences of Nazism
- New World Order (conspiracy theory) – A conspiracy theory hypothesizing a secretly emerging totalitarian world government.
- New world order (an international relations theory)
- Posen speeches – In two notable speeches delivered in October 1943, Himmler details the tasks of the SS in implementing the New Order.
- Hegemony
- Hypothetical Axis victory in World War II

== Bibliography ==
=== Primary sources ===
- Goebbels, Joseph (1970). The Goebbels Diaries, 1942–1943. Westport, Connecticut: Praeger. p. 591. ISBN 978-0-8371-3815-2.
- Himmler, Heinreich, Posen speeches (4 and 6 October 1943).
- Hitler, Adolf, Mein Kampf (1925).
- Roosevelt, Franklin D., On U.S. Involvement in the War in Europe (15 March 1941); Navy Day Annapolis speech (27 October 1941).
- Rosenberg, Alfred Der Mythus des 20. Jahrhunderts ["The Myth of the 20th Century"], 1930.
- Rosenberg, Alfred, Krisis und Neubau Europas (1934). Berlin.
- Rosenberg, Alfred, personal diary.

=== Literature ===
- Evans, Richard J. (2008). The Third Reich at war. Internet Archive. Penguin Press. pp. 321–402. ISBN 978-1-59420-206-3.
- Förster, Jürgen (1998). "Operation Barbarossa as a War of Conquest and Annihilation". In Boog, Horst; Förster, Jürgen; Hoffmann, Joachim; Klink, Ernst; Müller, Rolf-Dieter; Ueberschär, Gerd R. (eds.). The Attack on the Soviet Union. Germany and the Second World War. Vol. IV. Translated by McMurry, Dean S.; Osers, Ewald; Willmot, Louise. Militärgeschichtliches Forschungsamt (Military History Research Office (Germany)). Oxford: Clarendon Press. pp. 481–521. ISBN 0-19-822886-4.
- Stegemann, Bernd; Vogel, Detlef (1995). Germany and the Second World War: The Mediterranean, South-East Europe, and North Africa, 1939–1941. Oxford University Press. ISBN 0-19-822884-8.
- Longerich, Peter (2011). Heinrich Himmler. OUP Oxford. ISBN 978-0-19-161989-2.
