= German colonization =

German colonization may refer to:

- German colonization of the Americas

- German colonization of Valdivia, Osorno and Llanquihue

- German colonization of Africa
- German colonization in the Pacific Ocean

== See also ==
- German colonial empire
- Ostsiedlung, medieval eastward migration
- Drang nach Osten, 19th century expansion into Slavic lands
- Lebensraum, Nazi reinterpretation of Drang nach Osten
