= Epistemology in Advaita Vedanta =

The ancient and medieval texts of Advaita Vedanta and other schools of Hindu philosophy discuss Pramana (epistemology). The theory of Pramana discusses questions like how correct knowledge can be acquired; how one knows, how one doesn't; and to what extent knowledge pertinent about someone or something can be acquired. Advaita Vedānta, accepts the following six kinds of pramāṇas:

1. Pratyakṣam (प्रत्यक्षम्) - perception
2. Anumāṇam (अनुमानम्) - inference
3. Upamāṇam (उपमानम्) - comparison, analogy
4. Arthāpattih (अर्थापत्तिः) - postulation, derivation from circumstances
5. Anupalabdih (अनुपलब्धिः) - non-perception, negative/cognitive proof
6. Śabdah (शब्दः) - relying on word, testimony of past or present reliable experts

== Pratyakṣam (perception) ==
Pratyakṣam (प्रत्यक्षम्), perception, is of two types: external - that arising from the interaction of five senses and worldly objects, and internal - perception of inner sense, the mind. Advaita postulates four pre-requisites for correct perception: 1) Indriyarthasannikarsa (direct experience by one's sensory organ(s) with the object, whatever is being studied), 2) Avyapadesya (non-verbal; correct perception is not through hearsay, according to ancient Indian scholars, where one's sensory organ relies on accepting or rejecting someone else's perception), 3) Avyabhicara (does not wander; correct perception does not change, nor is it the result of deception because one's sensory organ or means of observation is drifting, defective, suspect) and 4) Vyavasayatmaka (definite; correct perception excludes judgments of doubt, either because of one's failure to observe all the details, or because one is mixing inference with observation and observing what one wants to observe, or not observing what one does not want to observe). The internal perception concepts included pratibha (intuition), samanyalaksanapratyaksa (a form of induction from perceived specifics to a universal), and jnanalaksanapratyaksa (a form of perception of prior processes and previous states of a 'topic of study' by observing its current state).

== Anumāṇam (inference) ==
Anumāṇam (अनुमानम्), inference, is defined as applying reason to reach a new conclusion about truth from one or more observations and previous understanding of truths. Observing smoke and inferring fire is an example of Anumana. This epistemological method for gaining knowledge consists of three parts: 1) Pratijna (hypothesis), 2) Hetu (a reason), and 3) drshtanta (examples). The hypothesis must further be broken down into two parts: 1) Sadhya (that idea which needs to proven or disproven) and 2) Paksha (the object on which the Sadhya is predicated). The inference is conditionally true if Sapaksha (positive examples as evidence) are present, and if Vipaksha (negative examples as counter-evidence) are absent. For rigor, the Indian philosophies further demand Vyapti - the requirement that the hetu (reason) must necessarily and separately account for the inference in "all" cases, in both sapaksha and vipaksha. A conditionally proven hypothesis is called a nigamana (conclusion).

== Upamāṇam (comparison, analogy) ==
Upamāṇam (उपमानम्), comparison, analogy. Some Hindu schools consider it as a proper means of knowledge. Upamana, states Lochtefeld, may be explained with the example of a traveler who has never visited lands or islands with endemic population of wildlife. Travelers are told, by someone who has been there, that in those lands you see an animal that sort of looks like a cow, grazes like cow but is different from a cow in such and such way. Such use of analogy and comparison is, state the Indian epistemologists, a valid means of conditional knowledge, as it helps the traveller identify the new animal later. The subject of comparison is formally called upameyam, the object of comparison is called upamanam, while the attribute(s) are identified as samanya.

== Arthāpattih (postulation) ==
Arthāpattih (अर्थापत्तिः), postulation, derivation from circumstances. In contemporary logic, this pramana is similar to circumstantial implication. As example, if a person left in a boat on river earlier, and the time is now past the expected time of arrival, then the circumstances support the truth postulate that the person has arrived. Many Indian scholars considered this Pramana as invalid or at best weak, because the boat may have gotten delayed or diverted. However, in cases such as deriving the time of a future sunrise or sunset, this method was asserted by the proponents to be reliable.

== Anupalabdih (non-perception, negative/cognitive proof) ==
Anupalabdih (अनुपलब्धिः), non-perception, negative/cognitive proof. Anupalabdhi pramana suggests that knowing a negative, such as "there is no jug in this room" is a form of valid knowledge. If something can be observed or inferred or proven as non-existent or impossible, then one knows more than what one did without such means. In Advaita school of Hindu philosophy, a valid conclusion is either sadrupa (positive) or asadrupa (negative) relation - both correct and valuable. Like other pramana, Indian scholars refined Anupalabdi to four types: non-perception of the cause, non-perception of the effect, non-perception of object, and non-perception of contradiction. Only two schools of Hinduism accepted and developed the concept "non-perception" as a pramana. Advaita considers this method as valid and useful when the other five pramanas fail in one's pursuit of knowledge and truth. A variation of Anupaladbi, called Abhava (अभाव) has also been posited as an epistemic method. It means non-existence. Some scholars consider Anupalabdi to be same as Abhava, while others consider Anupalabdi and Abhava as different. Abhava-pramana has been discussed in Advaita in the context of Padārtha (पदार्थ, referent of a term). A Padartha is defined as that which is simultaneously Astitva (existent), Jneyatva (knowable) and Abhidheyatva (nameable). Abhava was further refined in four types, by the schools of Hinduism that accepted it as a useful method of epistemology: dhvamsa (termination of what existed), atyanta-abhava (impossibility, absolute non-existence, contradiction), anyonya-abhava (mutual negation, reciprocal absence) and pragavasa (prior, antecedent non-existence).

== Śabdah (relying on testimony) ==
Śabdah (शब्दः), relying on word, testimony of past or present reliable experts. Hiriyanna explains Sabda-pramana as a concept which means reliable expert testimony. The schools of Hinduism which consider it epistemically valid suggest that a human being needs to know numerous facts, and with the limited time and energy available, he can learn only a fraction of those facts and truths directly. He must rely on others, his parent, family, friends, teachers, ancestors and kindred members of society to rapidly acquire and share knowledge and thereby enrich each other's lives. This means of gaining proper knowledge is either spoken or written, but through Sabda (words). The reliability of the source is important, and legitimate knowledge can only come from the Sabda of reliable sources. The disagreement between Advaita and other schools of Hinduism has been on how to establish reliability.

== Sources ==
- Datta, D.M. (1992) [1932], The Six Ways of Knowing: A Critical study of the Advaita theory of knowledge, University of Calcutta, Motilal Banarsidass Publishers Private Limited, pp. 221–253, ISBN 978-8120835269
- Grimes, John A. (1996), A Concise Dictionary of Indian Philosophy: Sanskrit Terms Defined in English, SUNY Press, ISBN 978-0-7914-3067-5
- Puligandla, Ramakrishna (1997), Fundamentals of Indian Philosophy, New Delhi: D.K. Printworld (P) Ltd.
