= German colonization of Africa =

German colonies in Africa in 1914

Germany colonized Africa during two distinct periods. In the 1680s, the Margraviate of Brandenburg, then leading the broader realm of Brandenburg-Prussia, pursued limited imperial efforts in West Africa. The Brandenburg African Company was chartered in 1682 and established two small settlements on the Gold Coast of what is today Ghana. Five years later, a treaty with the king of Arguin in Mauritania established a protectorate over that island, and Brandenburg occupied an abandoned fort originally constructed there by Portugal. Brandenburg — after 1701, the Kingdom of Prussia — pursued these colonial efforts until 1721, when Arguin was captured by the French and the Gold Coast settlements were sold to the Dutch Republic.

Over a century and a half later, the unified German Empire had emerged as a major world power. In 1884, pursuant to the Berlin Conference, colonies were officially established on the African west coast, often in areas already inhabited by German missionaries and merchants. The following year gunboats were dispatched to East Africa to contest the Sultan of Zanzibar's claims of sovereignty over the mainland in what is today Tanzania. Settlements in modern Guinea and Nigeria's Ondo State failed within a year; those in Burundi, Cameroon, Namibia, Rwanda, Tanzania, and Togo quickly grew into lucrative colonies. Together these six countries constituted Germany's African presence in the age of New Imperialism. They were invaded and largely occupied by the colonial forces of the Allied Powers during World War I, and in 1919 were transferred from German control by the League of Nations and divided between Belgium, France, Portugal, South Africa, and the United Kingdom.

The six principal colonies of German Africa, along with native kingdoms and polities, were the legal precedents of the modern states of Burundi, Cameroon, Namibia, Rwanda, Tanzania, and Togo. Chad, Gabon, Ghana, Mauritania, Kenya, Uganda, Mozambique, Angola, Somalia, Zambia, Nigeria, Central African Republic and Republic of the Congo were also under the control of German Africa at various points during its existence.

== Background ==
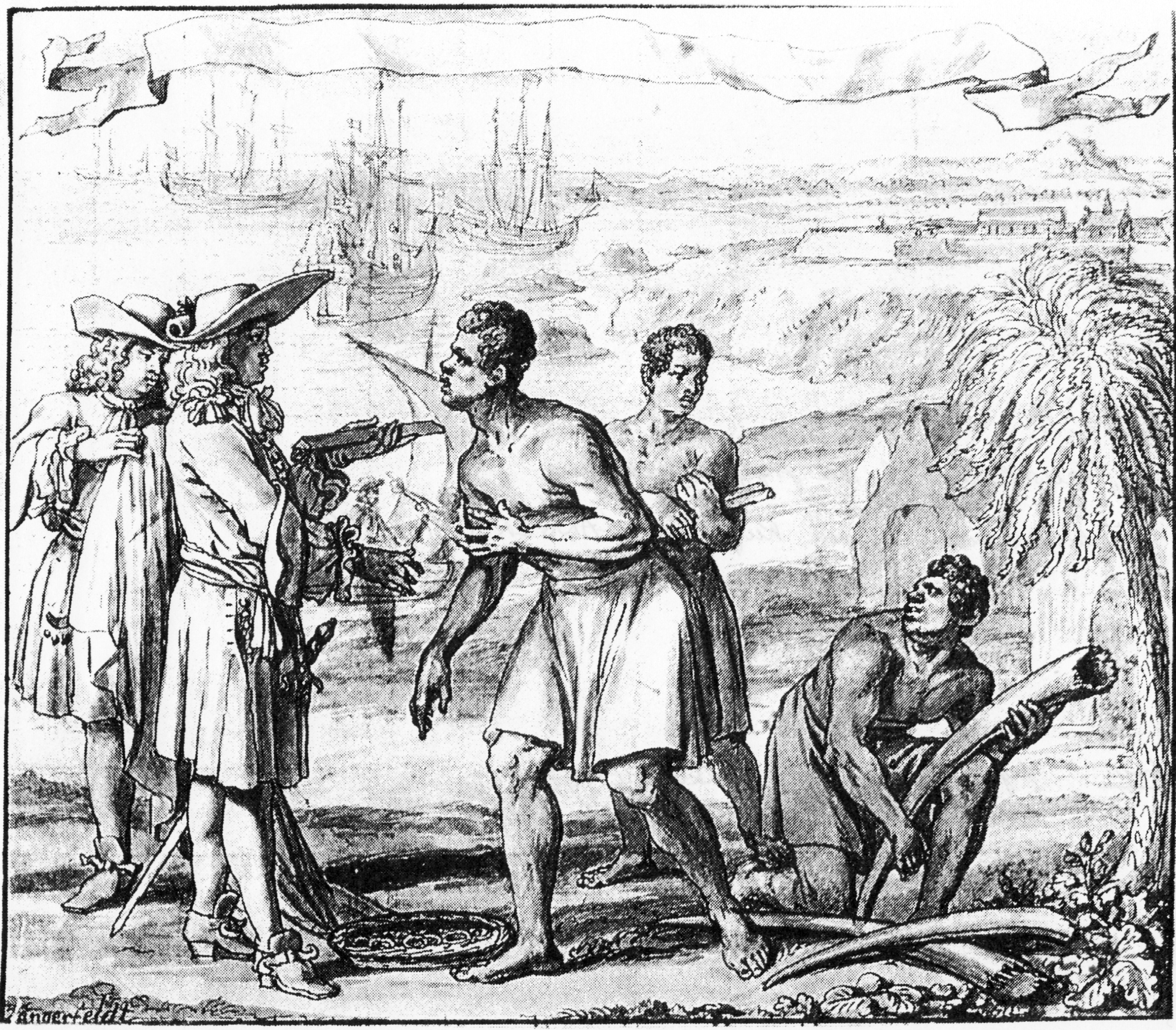
Prussian traders bartering with native africans at Gross-Friedrichsburg

The roots of German colonization in Africa trace back to the seventeenth and eighteenth centuries, when various German states, most notably Brandenburg-Prussia, made efforts to participate in overseas expansion, inspired by the activities of other European powers. The most notable of these early ventures was the establishment of the Brandenburg African Company (Brandenburger Afrikanische Compagnie), which operated between 1682 and 1721. The company founded trading posts, including Neufriedrichsburg along the Gold Coast in present-day Ghana, primarily for the purpose of trading gold, ivory, and slaves. However, these possessions remained minor, struggled with limited resources, and faced competition from Dutch, Danish, and British traders. The colonies were eventually sold to the Dutch in 1721.

During the 1860s and 1870s various organizations emerged in Germany with the aim of acquiring colonies. These groups, such as the Central-Verein für Handels-Geographie und deutsche Interesse in Ausland (founded in 1868 by Hamburg traders like Adolf Woermann) and the Verein für Handels-Geographie of Leipzig, primarily sought to open new markets for German goods and conducted geographical research to support their commercial interests.

The depression of the late 1870s and Germany’s shift to protectionist policies spurred the creation of more active colonial organizations. Notably, Friedrich Fabri founded the Westdeutscher Verein für Kolonisation und Export in 1880, which aimed to unite commercial, missionary, and emigrationist interests. Many of these new groups promoted the idea of colonies as potential outlets for German emigrants, hoping to win middle-class support by emphasizing the benefits of settlement and the alleviation of overpopulation. At the same time, colonialist arguments based on economic expansion gained traction. While emigrationist rhetoric was popular, the most convincing arguments for the government and business leaders were those advocating for trading colonies to secure German markets and protect investments. This dual approach—settlement colonialism for public support and economic colonialism for policy—helped rally a broad base behind the colonial cause.

In 1882, various colonialist factions united to form the Kolonialverein, which actively campaigned for colonies and lobbied the German parliament. Yet, not all colonialists joined this umbrella group; figures like Carl Peters established their own organizations, such as the Gesellschaft für deutsche Kolonisation, which pursued both settlement and commercial activities in East Africa. Key thinkers like Friedrich Fabri and Carl Peters shaped colonial ideology. Fabri, a missionary and publicist, argued in his book Bedarf Deutschland der Colonien, that Germany needed colonies to secure its economic future and provide outlets for surplus population, advocating for settlement colonies in temperate regions. Peters, influenced by British colonialism, combined calls for agricultural settlement with personal commercial ambitions.

Despite the prominence of settlement colonialism in public propaganda, German government and business interests were more motivated by the economic benefits of trading colonies. Economic colonialism envisioned African territories as sources of raw materials and markets for German manufactures, requiring less direct involvement and risk than large-scale settlement. Missionaries and explorers also played a role, though their influence was generally limited. Fabri was a notable exception, using his mission connections to advocate for colonial protectorates, particularly in Southwest Africa. By 1883, the colonial movement had become a significant force in German politics, creating conditions that encouraged Chancellor Otto von Bismarck to reverse his previous opposition to overseas expansion. This paved the way for Germany’s acquisition of colonies in Africa and the Pacific, driven by a mix of commercial ambition, nationalist sentiment, and the search for new markets and prestige.

== Acquisition of the colonies ==
Geographical map of the German colonies (red) in Africa

The immediate spark for Bismarck's actions was a series of requests from German trading companies and adventurers who had settled along the African coast, especially in South West Africa (now Namibia), Togo, Cameroon, and East Africa. When rival European powers threatened to invade these areas, German commercial interests petitioned the government for protection and formal colonial status. Among the most prominent of these appeals were Adolf Lüderitz's request for protection of his land holdings in South West Africa and similar petitions from traders in Cameroon and Togo.

Bismarck saw the response to these demands as an opportunity to achieve several goals at once: he could use the colonial enthusiasm of the population to strengthen his political position at home, protect and promote German economic interests abroad, and assert Germany's status as a world power without excessive financial or military commitments. In 1884, he began issuing imperial charters and proclaiming German protectorates in Africa, officially entering Germany into the colonial race. This decision was less the result of a sudden ideological shift than a pragmatic response to changing political, economic, and international conditions.

== Eastern Africa ==
German East Africa was acquired through a combination of treaties, purchase agreements, and military enforcement by agents and representatives of the German Empire in the late nineteenth century. The process began in 1884, when Carl Peters, a German explorer and adventurer, founded the Society for German Colonization (Gesellschaft für Deutsche Kolonisation) and traveled to the coastal region of East Africa, an area then under nominal sovereignty of the Sultanate of Zanzibar. Peters and his associates negotiated and signed a series of protection treaties with local chiefs in the hinterland of what is now Tanzania between 1884 and 1885. These treaties, often obtained through coercion or deception, granted the German society extensive rights over land and administration.

In 1885, Peters returned to Germany and persuaded the imperial government under Chancellor Otto von Bismarck to grant an imperial charter to the newly founded German East Africa Company (Deutsch-Ostafrikanische Gesellschaft, DOAG), giving it authority to administer and exploit the territories claimed through these agreements. The imperial charter provided official recognition and military backing, marking the beginning of formal German involvement. The Sultan of Zanzibar, Barghash bin Said, who claimed sovereignty over the coastal strip, protested the German expansion. Tensions escalated when the German navy demonstrated force off the coast of Zanzibar in 1885, compelling the Sultan to acquiesce.

The company did not waste any time in dispatching eighteen expeditions to make treaties expanding its territories in East Africa, but these moves by the Germans stirred hostility in the region. When the company’s agents landed to take over seven coastal towns in the August of 1888, the tension finally escalated into violence. Warriors flocked to a few of the coastal towns and gave the Germans two days to leave. In one instance, two Germans were killed in the town of Kilwa; German marines were eventually ordered in who cleared the town, killing every person in sight. Resistance was seen all over German-controlled Africa, but the German soldiers and officers made up one of the best and most highly-trained armies in the world, so the action of rebelling did not have much of a long-term impact. Subsequent negotiations, including the Heligoland–Zanzibar Treaty of 1890 between Germany and Britain, further defined the boundaries of the colony, with Britain recognizing German claims to mainland East Africa in exchange for German recognition of British interests in Zanzibar and other territories.

=== The consolidation of German rule in Tanganyika ===
By 1898, the Germans controlled all of Tanganyika’s main population centers and lines of communication. The next item of business for the Germans was to impose their rule over the small-scale societies further away from the caravan routes. This was done either by bargaining with African leaders or through warfare. After diplomacy concluded and the conflicts resulted in German victory, their regime used bands of gunmen to maintain authority over local leaders. Eventually, the main coastal towns, which were more settled, were converted into headquarters of administration districts, and civilian district officers were appointed. Further inland, administration grew outwards from strategic garrisons but was transferred to civilian hands more slowly. By 1914, Tanganyika was divided into 22 administrative districts, and only two of them were still ruled by soldiers. The chief characteristic of German rule was the power and autonomy of the district officer; sheer lack of communication dictated this. Orders from the capital may have taken months to reach remote districts and a remote station could expect a visit from a senior official only once a decade. The district officer exercised full jurisdiction over "natives", for although legislation specified the punishments he might impose, nothing defined the offences for which he might impose them. The German rule of East Africa was solely based on force and German officials inspired great terror.

=== Two broad phases of district administration ===
When the Germans were in control of Tanganyika, two broad phases can summarize their rule. In the 1890s their aims were military security and political control; to achieve this the Germans used a mixture of violence and alliances with African leaders. These ‘local compromises’, as they may be called, had common characteristics. The Germans offered political and military support for their allies in exchange for the recognition of German authority, provision of labor and building materials, and the use of diplomacy instead of force in settling issues. Moreover, the imposition of tax in 1898 initiated the transition to the second phase of administration whose chief characteristic was the collapse of the compromises made earlier in the decade. The old compromises collapsed because the increase in German military strength made them less dependent on local allies and while earlier officers often welcomed their collaborators' power, later ones suspected it. This led to a change from allied to adversarial relationships between some African leaders and the Germans. For example, Mtinginya of Usongo, a powerful Nyamwezi chief aided the Germans against Isike; but by 1901, he became a potential enemy and when he died a year or two later, his chiefdom was deliberately dismantled.However, this was not what happened in other scenarios. Many of the old African collaborators did not necessarily lose power in this second stage of German administration, but to survive they had to adapt themselves and often reorganize their societies.

== Cotton ==
Cotton production in German East Africa was administered in a much different manner than in other areas of the continent. In some places throughout Africa, the colonial state only needed to provide seeds of encouragement as commercial agriculture was already well established. The ultimate goal of Europeans was to establish a market economy and that was done by torturing Africans into a labour pool. In German East Africa, this was much harder to pursue, as agriculture was less developed, and farmers were sometimes tortured inhumanely into producing certain crops. The ‘cotton gospel’ was received less enthusiastically in Tanganyika than it was in British Uganda. That increased German brutality in East Africa, as Europeans would be willing to torture and kill to ensure their supply of raw materials.

In the initial stages of German control of East Africa, private German firms were given autonomy to run the establishment in the colony. These German companies operated out of Bremen and Hamburg; the businesses were at the commercial and political frontier of the expanding colonial state. However, this was quickly discovered to be inefficient as many of these firms went bankrupt due to mismanagement and African resistance. Most companies eventually gave way to governmental authority by the beginning of the 1920s, but the German colonial empire had already collapsed by that point.

== German Kamerun ==
A treaty signed in July 1884 by the chiefs of the coastal port of Douala and renowned explorer Gustav Nachtigal, who had extensive experience in Africa, established the formal German presence in Cameroon. Although Nachtigal acted on behalf of Chancellor Bismarck, the Woermann family's private trade interests were the true force behind the territorial acquisition. With a population of about 3.85 million at the time, German rule in Cameroon was centered on the coastline area, especially Douala, and the inland administrative hubs of Yaoundé and Edea. The short railway lines that linked Douala with the surrounding areas allowed for communication and economic exploitation. However, there was little authority over the large regions in the northeast, including the kingdom of Bornu and Adamawa, which are known for their supposedly limitless supply of ivory.

Although commerce of the Cameroon coast had been domintated by the British a slow and cautious interest in Kamerun had been growing among German businessmen for thirty years before the finalization of Kamerun as a protectorate. Companies like C. Woermann or Jantzen & Thormählen had been active since the 1868 respectively 1875. In the early years of German colonial rule, ivory was a prestigious commodity in Cameroon, trade in which was restricted to the social elites. Elephants were hunted by Hausa traders in northern Cameroon, who transported the ivory to the coast and exchanged it for industrial products. German expeditions were attracted by rumours of ivory deposits. In 1908, the government issued a decree to control elephant hunting and prohibited the killing of female elephants and elephant calves. Cameroon was never considered a potential German settlement area due to its unfavourable climate and malaria. The region was notorious for abuse of power and brutality, which were largely tolerated during the reign of Governor Jesco von Puttkamer.

The economic exploitation of Cameroon in the 1890s led to the development of West Africa's largest plantation colony, which was primarily used for cocoa cultivation. Governor von Puttkamer's uncompromising land policy, which confiscated allegedly ‘ownerless’ land and sold it to large companies, met with massive resistance from the Duala, leading to a letter to the Reichstag in 1905. Puttkamer was replaced in 1907, but the struggle for land continued. The Germans executed the former chief Rudolph Duala Manga Bell on trumped-up charges of treason, marking the end of a long-running dispute over racial segregation and land expropriation in Douala. Cameroon was Germany's most important colony in economic terms. However, the majority of exports came from the domestic economy, and the contribution of the plantations was minimal despite all the investment. Long caravans of porters transported goods from the hinterland to the coast, including rubber, ivory, palm oil and palm kernels. They were often traded by Hausa merchants, who had made a name for themselves as effective intermediaries between rural areas and the world market. As exports never exceeded imports, the overall balance of trade between Cameroon and Germany remained negative.

== German Togoland ==
When German interest became concrete in the early 1880s, the Togolese coast had already been part of the Atlantic trade networks for centuries and had been heavily involved in the transatlantic slave trade since the 15th century. The first Europeans to visit the region were Portuguese explorers, followed by Dutch, English, French, and Danish traders over the next two centuries, all of whom sought slaves at ports along the coast. While much of the slave trade was conducted through large ports outside of present-day Togo, such as Ouidah, some activities were concentrated in Petit Popo (now Aného), the only significant port on the Togolese coast before colonization. The German presence in Togo began in 1847 with missionary work, but ultimately it was economic interests that drove the acquisition. On April 24, 1884, German envoy Gustav Nachtigal signed a treaty with Chief Mlapa III, officially placing the coastal region of Togo under German protection. Although the European population in Togo never exceeded 350 people and was concentrated on a coastal strip only about 50 kilometers wide, German rule was quickly established.

During its thirty-year occupation by the Germans, Togoland was held up by many European imperialists as a model colony, primarily because the German regime produced balanced budgets and was devoid of any major wars. The formation of impressive rail networks and telegraph systems there further supported this opinion. However, it was in actuality a combination of forced labour and excessive taxation imposed on the native Togolanders that created these. While Togoland may have appeared to be a "model" to Europeans, Togolanders endured a regime characterized by the aforementioned labor and taxation policies, harsh punishments inflicted by German district officers, grossly inadequate health care and education systems, and prohibition from many commercial activities. The Germans made sure that they had complete control over both Togoland and its inhabitants. However, at the start of the First World War, the combined forces of the British and the French invaded the colony and the Germans capitulated, after only a few skirmishes, on 26 August 1914. A British writer, Albert E. Calvert, tried to understand this distinct difference; Calvert argued that the natives of Togoland ended their ‘allegiance’ with the Germans as soon as the Germans were put in a position of pressure, that the terrible treatment they endured under the Germans was the reason for their welcoming of the Anglo-French invasion as well as the joy they expressed after the German surrender. The Germans quickly responded, to defend their honour, by stating that the Africans were more than satisfied with German sovereignty, that they desired nothing more than its continuance. Some Germans also argued that the colonial territories which blossomed under their rule were economically ruined after they were expunged. This tension between the Allied and German governments over German colonies lasted until the outbreak of World War II.

== German South West Africa ==
When Reich Chancellor Bismarck declared Angra Pequena, now Lüderitz Bay, a protectorate on April 24, 1884, this became the first official German colony on African soil under the name South West Africa, today it is the country of Namibia. The colony of South West Africa, with a population of 200,000, was founded by Adolf Lüderitz, a tobacco merchant from Bremen who was involved in illegal arms trading. After he sold his property, the German government intervened to prevent Germany's reputation from being damaged. Tensions between the Herero and Nama ethnic groups made it easier for the Germans to take control. The leaders of both communities, Samuel Maharero and Hendrik Witbooi, tried to use the German presence for their own interests. A systematic colonial policy with long-term development strategies did not begin until 1894 under Governor Theodor Leutwein, who held office for ten years. Despite public commitments to a “peaceful conquest,” the consolidation of power was marked by numerous military operations. Leutwein's main goal was to make South West Africa the only German settler colony. The German state actively promoted the settlement of white, especially German, settlers and expanded the colonial bureaucracy to ensure the rule of law and organize the economic exploitation of the area. At the same time, Leutwein pursued a “divide and rule” strategy, known as the “Leutwein system,” by strengthening local rulers.

This policy led to massive land expropriations: 70% of the land was awarded to German farmers. By the First World War, around 14,000 Europeans, including 12,000 Germans, were living in the colony. The expropriation of the Nama and Herero was secured by new laws and a two-class system, forcing many Africans into economic dependence. The situation worsened in 1897 due to a cattle plague epidemic that deprived many Herero of their livelihoods. The resulting hardship contributed significantly to the Herero and Nama uprising from 1904 to 1907, which was brutally suppressed by the Germans. Economically, the colony remained insignificant for the German Empire; the barren soil was mainly suitable for cattle breeding. It was not until copper mining began in 1907 and diamonds were discovered in 1908 that the colony became profitable for private companies. For the government, however, South West Africa remained a loss-making venture due to high infrastructure and military expenditure.

=== Annihilation war against Herero and Nama ===
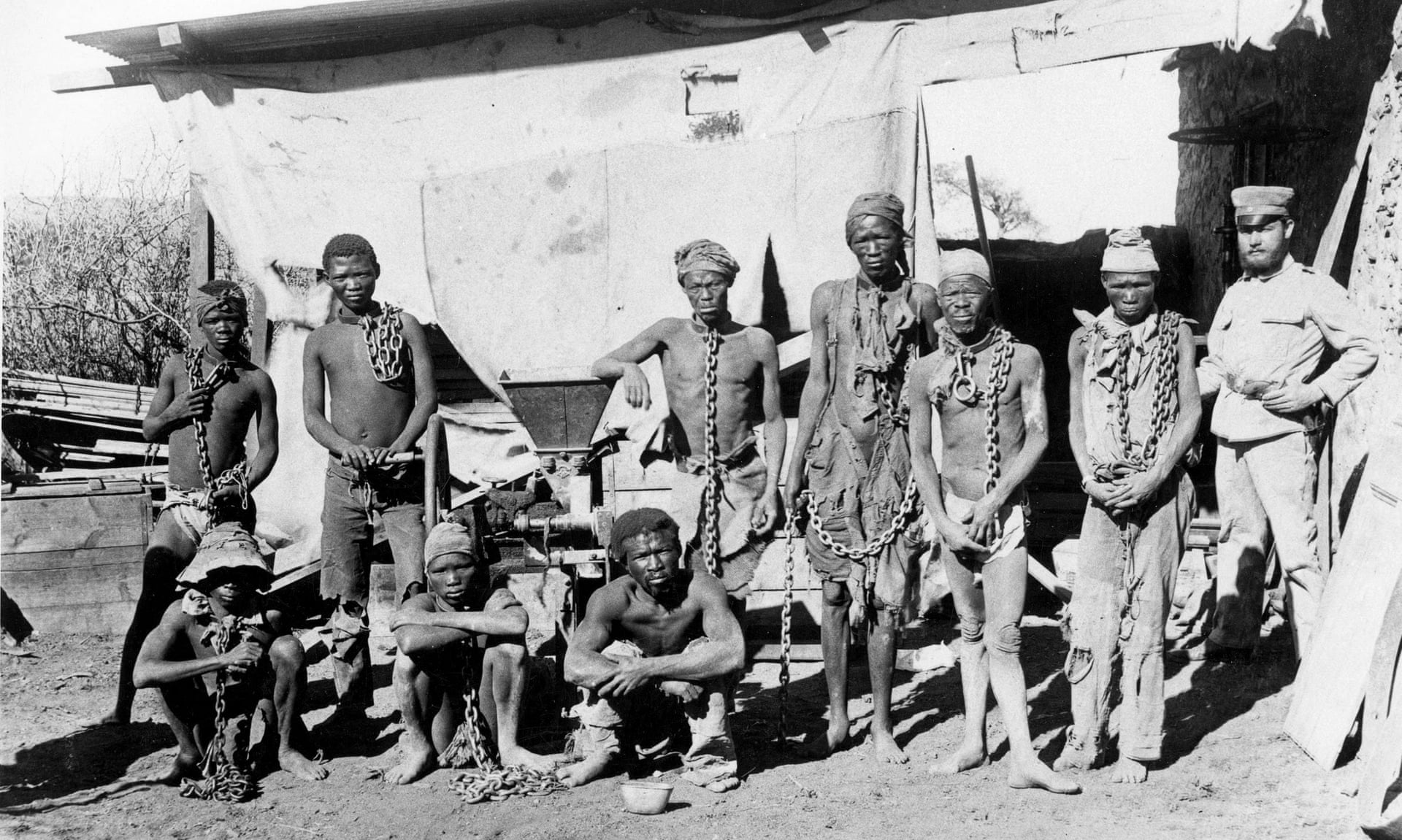
A photograph of chained Herero and Nama prisoners during the genocide

Before the outbreak of violence, the Herero and Nama peoples experienced increasing marginalization and exploitation under German colonial rule, which began officially in 1884. German settlers and colonial authorities expropriated land and cattle from indigenous communities, imposed harsh taxation and forced labor, and undermined traditional leadership structures. Tensions were exacerbated as German settlers encroached on grazing lands and water sources, leading to economic hardship and social disruption among the Herero and Nama. The colonial administration often responded to indigenous resistance with military reprisals and punitive expeditions, fostering deep resentment and hostility.

The origins of the genocide lay in this context of dispossession and repression. In January 1904, the Herero, led by Samuel Maharero, launched a large-scale uprising against German colonial rule, targeting military outposts, railway lines, and settler farms. Their aim was to reclaim lost land and resist further colonial encroachment. The Nama, under leaders such as Hendrik Witbooi, joined the resistance later in the year. The German response, initially commanded by Governor Theodor Leutwein and subsequently by General Lothar von Trotha, was marked by escalating brutality. After suffering unexpected losses, von Trotha was appointed with orders to suppress the rebellion decisively.

Von Trotha implemented a strategy of annihilation, culminating in the issuing of the infamous “extermination proklamation” (Vernichtungsbefehl) against the Herero in October 1904. This order declared that every Herero found within German territory, regardless of age or gender, was to be killed, and explicitly denied them the right to return. The German army pursued fleeing Herero into the Omaheke Desert, sealing off access to water sources and leaving thousands to die of thirst and starvation. Survivors who surrendered or were captured, including women and children, were placed in concentration camps such as those on Shark Island and at Lüderitz, where they faced forced labor, malnutrition, disease, and systematic abuse. The Nama suffered similar treatment after their own uprising was brutally suppressed, with mass executions, forced labor, and internment.

The conditions in the camps were catastrophic, with extremely high mortality rates due to abuse, hunger, and disease. In total, from October 1904 to March 1907 between 30 and 50 per cent of the internees died — 7,682 prisoners. It is estimated that up to 80 percent of the Herero population and half of the Nama population perished as a result of these policies. The genocide resulted in the near destruction of the Herero and Nama societies and left enduring trauma and demographic changes in Namibia.

== Impact of Treaty of Versailles ==
Before the Treaty of Versailles was even signed, nations of the entente powers (Great Britain, France and Japan) had total control over the German colonies (In Africa and Asia) since 1915, except for East Africa. Great Britain and France had made secret arrangements splitting German territory and the Treaty of Versailles only cemented what had already taken place. The treaty only further confirmed that “Germany renounced to the Allied and Associated powers all rights and titles to her overseas territories”. After World War I, Germany did not just lose territory but lost commercial footholds, spheres of influence, and imperialistic ambitions of continued expansion. Germany was severely weakened by the Treaty of Versailles but attempted everything to regain their overseas empire. The Germans thought the dispossession of their colonies was an injustice, and reiterated their economic need of the colonies, and their duty to civilize the backward races.The Germans put forward two proposals for colonial settlement: first, that a special committee, who would at least hear Germany’s side of the issue, handle the matter; and second, that Germany be allowed to administer her former colonies. The Allies rejected these proposals and refused to alter the colonial settlement that an agreement was reached upon. The Allies rejected the proposals because the native inhabitants of the German colonies were strongly opposed to being brought under their control again. German frustration from their territories being stolen from them and the extensive amount of reparations they were forced to pay led directly to World War II.

== List of colonies ==
=== Established by Brandenburg-Prussia, 1682–1721 ===
- Arguin
- Brandenburger Gold Coast

=== Established by the German Empire, 1884–1919 ===
- German East Africa
- German South West Africa
- German West Africa
  - Kamerun and Neukamerun
  - Togoland

== See also ==
- German colonial empire
- Mittelafrika
- List of former German colonies
- German colonization of the Americas
- Languages of Africa

== Bibliography ==
- Carsten, F. L.; et al. (The New Cambridge Modern History) (1961). "The Rise of Brandenburg". The Ascendancy of France 1648-88. Vol. V. Cambridge: Cambridge University Press.
- Conrad, Sebastian (2012). Globalisation and the nation in imperial Germany. Cambridge: Cambridge University Press. ISBN 978-0-521-76307-3.
- Cornevin, Robert; et al. (Colonialism in Africa, 1870-1960) (1969). "The Germans in Africa before 1918". The History and Politics of Colonialism 1870–1914. Vol. I. London: Cambridge University Press. ISBN 0-521-07373-1.
- Fanso, Verkijika G.; et al. (Introduction to the History of Cameroon: Nineteenth and Twentieth Centuries) (1989). Trade and supremacy on the Cameroon coast. New York: St. Martin's Press. ISBN 0-312-03644-2.
- Iliffe, John (1979). A Modern History of Tanganyika. Cambridge: Cambridge University Press. ISBN 0-521-22024-6.
- Koch, H.W.; et al. (Absolutism in Seventeenth-century Europe) (1990). Brandenburg-Prussia. New York: St. Martin's Press. ISBN 0-312-04930-7.
- Laumann, Dennis (2003). "A Historiography of German Togoland, or the Rise and Fall of a 'Model Colony'"". History in Africa. 30. Cambridge: Cambridge University Press. JSTOR 3172089.
- Pakenham, Thomas (1990). The Scramble for Africa. Johannesburg: Jonathan Ball. ISBN 1-86842-041-8.
- Reid, Richard J. (2020). A History of Modern Africa: 1800 to the Present. Hoboken: John Wiley & Sons Limited. ISBN 978-1-119-38192-1.
- Smith, Woodruff D. (1978). The German colonial empire. Chapel Hill: University of North Carolina Press. ISBN 0-807-81322-2.
- Townsend, Mary Evelyn (1966). The Rise and Fall of Germany's Colonial Empire: 1884-1918. New York: Howard Fertig. OCLC 834347547.
- Zimmerer, Jürgen (2024). Von Windhuk nach Auschwitz? Beiträge zum Verhältnis von Kolonialismus und Holocaust. Berlin: De Gryter Oldenbourg. ISBN 978-3-11-075420-9.
